= (Romance) in the Digital Age =

- Directed by: Jason Michael Brescia
- Written by: Jason Michael Brescia
- Produced by: Brian Volk-Weiss
- Starring: Chris Warren Jr.; LOLO; Joe Murphy; Brian Myers
- Cinematography: S. Hamza Ahmad
- Distributed by: Comedy Dynamics
- Release date: November 7, 2017
- Running time: 84 minutes
- Country: United States
- Language: English

(Romance) in the Digital Age is a 2017 feature-length film written and directed by Jason Michael Brescia.

== Plot ==
The film is music focused, which according to Deadline, "a former emo musician who invites his ex-bandmates to his Christmas-themed wedding." While there a video of the fictional band Autumn in August performing the song P.S. Whatever, which in turn becomes a viral hit.

== Cast ==
Like Brescia's previous film Bridge and Tunnel, (Romance) In The Digital Age features an ensemble cast.

- Lauren Pritchard as Ellis Tillman
- Chris Warren Jr. as Marcellus Roberts
- Joe Murphy as Finn McGee
- Chris Viemeister as Casey Thayer
- Shabazz Green as Booker Roberts
- Jill Durso as Cameron
- Brian Myers as Pythagoras
- Lauren Moore as Michelle
- Joe D'Onofrio as Father Scott
- Lauren Adams as Rosa
- Virgil as Kony
- Keith McMahon as Perry
- Chamique Holdsclaw as Chamique Holdsclaw
- Ryan Karels as Kenny Buccari
- Kurt Metzger as Brian

The film also features cameo appearances by Frank Iero of My Chemical Romance, Andrew W.K., John Nolan of Taking Back Sunday, Mary Kate Wiles, Annet Mahendru, Hornswoggle, and Tay Zonday.

== Production ==
Shooting for the film began on February 27, 2016 in Long Beach, New York and wrapped on March 17 of the same year. The film was shot entirely in Long Beach and Amityville, New York, a Long Island suburb. Pickups for certain segments took place throughout 2016, with the final segment featuring Annet Mahendru wrapping up in February, 2017.

== Release ==
On June 7, 2017 it was announced by Deadline that the film had been acquired by Comedy Dynamics for global distribution. In August 2017 the film premiered at the Long Beach International Film Festival where it received the Joan Jett Music Award for "Best Music". On November 3, 2017 the film had a screening in New York City featuring a concert afterwards featuring John Nolan and LOLO performing songs from the film's soundtrack. The following night in Amityville, Nolan and LOLO performed full sets at the soundtrack release show

On November 7, 2017 (Romance) In The Digital Age was released worldwide on video on demand. That night the film also screened in Los Angeles at the Regal Cinema at L.A. Live.
