= Barry Pearl =

American actor (born 1950)

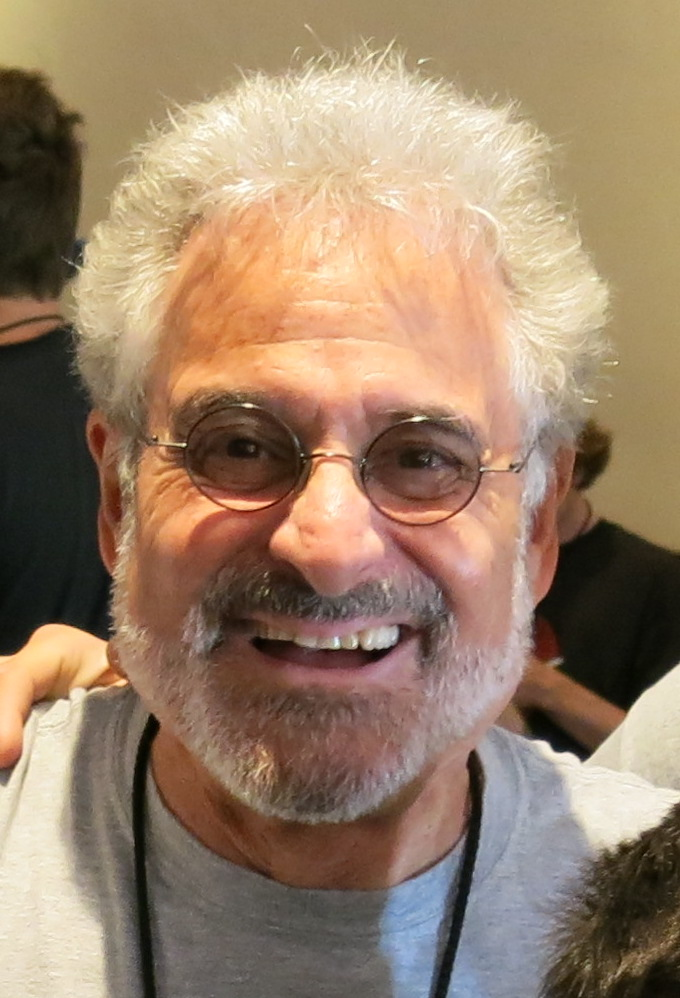
- Pearl in 2017
- Born: March 29, 1950 (age 76); Lancaster, Pennsylvania
- Education: Carnegie Mellon University
- Occupation: Actor
- Years active: 1961–present
- Spouses: Marie Elyse Soape (m. 19??; div. 1970); Susan Berger (m. 1976; div. 1992); Heather Brown (m. 1997; div. 2001); Cindy Pearl (m. 2016)
- Children: 4

Barry Lee Pearl (born March 29, 1950, in Lancaster, Pennsylvania) is an American character actor. He is best known for his role as "Doody", one of the three supporting T-Birds, in the 1978 film version of Grease. He also had a cameo as Mr. Weaver in the Grease: Live television special on Fox in 2016.

== Early life ==
Pearl was born in Lancaster, Pennsylvania to an Orthodox Jewish family. Despite growing up Orthodox Jewish, he celebrated both Hanukkah and Christmas as a child as 2 of his aunts were married to Christians.

== Career ==
He played "Professor Tinkerputt" in the primetime special Barney's Imagination Island and the US tour of Barney's Big Surprise, a stage production based on the popular TV show as well as a video of the same name.

He began his career in 1961 replacing Johnny Borden as “Randolph MaAfee” in Broadway's Bye Bye Birdie. Other Broadway credits include Oliver! in 1962, A Teaspoon Every Four Hours in 1969, The Producers in 2005, Lenny's Back in 2008 and Baby It's You! in 2011. In 2012 he starred in the Lionsgate release The Newest Pledge. He also starred as "Arnold" in the national tour of Happy Days - A New Musical. In 2014, he was part of the series Summer with Cimorelli.

During the summers he teaches film arts all across the US to the special needs community with Joey Travolta's Inclusion Film Company.

== Filmography ==
=== Films ===
| Year | Film | Role | Director | Notes |
|---|---|---|---|---|
| 1965 | A Thousand Clowns | Nick Burns' Double | Fred Coe | Uncredited |
| 1967 | P.J. | Kid | John Guillermin | Uncredited |
| 1968 | Pink is a Many Splintered Thing | Lumberjack Saying "Timber" (voice) | Gerry Chiniquy | Short film |
| 1969 | The Adventures of the Prince and the Pauper | Tom Canty (the Pauper) | Elliot Geisinger | |
| 1978 | Grease | Doody | Randal Kleiser | |
| 1981 | Flicks | Red | Peter Winograd | Segment: "New Adventures of the Great Galaxy" |
| 1987 | Dutch Treat | Dead Meat | Boaz Davidson | |
| 1994 | Tryst | Doctor | Peter Foldy | |
| 1998 | Barney's Big Surprise | Professor Tinkerputt | Clark Santee | Direct-to-video release |
| 2009 | Imps* | Bob | Scott Mansfield | Segment: "Bookreading". Direct-to-video release |
| 2009 | Special Delivery | Dr. Shabin | Sean Spence | |
| 2010 | The Newest Pledge | Mr. Motes | Jason Michael Brescia | |
| 2016 | Lights, Camera, Independence | Self | | Documentary |
| 2016 | Straight Outta Oz | Museum Curator | Todrick Hall | Visual album released on YouTube in conjunction with album release |
| 2019 | The Silent Natural | Milwaukee Owner | David Risotto | |
| 2020 | Squeeze | Barry | Cole Vallis | Short film |
| 2024 | Rock and Doris (try to) Write a Movie | Weasel; Groucho | Michael Schlesinger | |

=== Television ===
| Year(s) | Title | Role(s) | Notes |
|---|---|---|---|
| 1966 | The Ballad of Smokey the Bear | Smokey the Bear (voice) | TV movie |
| 1969 | N.Y.P.D. | Second Boy | S2E13 "The Body in the Trunk" |
| 1976 | The Doctors | Anesthesiologist | Episodes #3,406 and #3,409 |
| 1976–1977 | C.P.O. Sharkey | Recruit Mignone | Main role in first season. 14 episodes |
| 1977 | Best Friends | Gypsy | TV movie |
| 1977 | Have I Got a Christmas for You | Barry Silver | TV movie |
| 1979 | Barney Miller | Mario Pellegrini | S5E14 "Voice Analyzer" |
| 1981 | The Munsters' Revenge | Warren Thurston | TV movie |
| 1981 | Eight Is Enough | Bruce | S5E19 "The Idolbreaker: Part 2" |
| 1982 | Benson | Jerry Ziegler | S3E14 "Katie's Romance" |
| 1982 | Hill Street Blues | Salesman | S2E17 "The Shooter" |
| 1983 | Making of a Male Model | Clarence | TV movie |
| 1985 | Alice | Cop No. 4 | S9E8 "Vera's Anniversary Blues" |
| 1985 | Scarecrow and Mrs. King | Leon Sacks | S2E14 "A Little Sex, A Little Scandal" |
| 1985 | HeartBeat | Choreographer | TV movie |
| 1985 | Alfred Hitchcock Presents | Assistant District Attorney | S1E3 "Wake Me When I'm Dead" |
| 1985 | Falcon Crest | Music Video Director | S5E12 "False Hope" |
| 1986 | Growing Pains | | S1E20 "Be a Man" |
| 1986 | Annihilator | Eddie | TV movie |
| 1986–1999 | Days of Our Lives | various roles | 8 episodes |
| 1987 | Throb | Oily Guy | S1E21 "Moonlighting" |
| 1987 | The Tracey Ullman Show | Club Manager | S1E5 |
| 1987 | Max Headroom | Prosecutor Paul Waites | S2E1 "Academy" |
| 1987 | Murder, She Wrote | P.R. Staffer | S4E8 "Steal Me a Story" |
| 1990 | Major Dad | Mike Eagleton | S1E26 "Face the Music... and Dance: Part 2" |
| 1991 | They Came from Outer Space | Bill Rabkin | S1E13 "High Five" |
| 1991 | Beverly Hills, 90210 | Norman | S2E17 "Chuckie's Back" |
| 1993 | Sisters | Stan Smigel | S3E16 "Things Are Tough All Over" |
| 1994 | Bedtime with Barney: Imagination Island | Professor Tinkerputt | Television special |
| 1995 | ER | Dr. Noble | S1E14 "Long Day's Journey" |
| 1996 | Siegfried & Roy: Masters of the Impossible | Rumpelstiltskin | |
| 1996 | Baywatch Nights | Paul Whitset | S1E14 "Backup" |
| 1996 | Night Stand with Dick Dietrick | Menachem; Little Buddy | S1E11 "Hatred's Not a Four-Letter Word"; S1E47 "Gold-Diggers of 1996" |
| 1998 | Port Charles | Dr. Aikman | 5 episodes |
| 1999 | Baywatch | Lyle Forsman | S10E8 "Father of the Groom" |
| 2000 | Malibu, CA | J.J. | S2E23 "The House Guest" |
| 2000 | Even Stevens | Mr. Chaney | S1E10 "Easy Way" |
| 2001 | Behind the Music | Self (Doody) | S4E17 "Grease" |
| 2002 | Where Are They Now? | Self (Doody) | S3E12 "Grease" |
| 2002 | After They Were Famous | Self | S3E13 "Grease" |
| 2002 | Rugrats | Quartet Singer (voice) | S9E2 "Babies in Toyland Part 2" |
| 2003 | Miss Match | Morty | S1E8 "The Love Bandit" |
| 2008 | Criminal Minds | Man | S3E20 "Lo-Fi" |
| 2009 | House | Dr. Paulson | S6E2 "Epic Fail" |
| 2011 | Outside the Box | Captain Keller | S1E1 "The Miracle Worker" |
| 2012 | Far from the Tree | Barry | S3E2 "Poker Night" |
| 2014 | Summer with Cimorelli | Barry Ortega | S1E4 "Welcome to Show Business" |
| 2016 | Grease Live! | Stan Weaver | Television special |
| 2016 | Paul O'Grady's 100 Years of Movie Musicals | Self (Doody) | Television special |
| 2018 | Behind Closed Doors | Self (Doody) | S1E8 "Grease" |
| 2018–2021 | Boomers | Murray Klein | 6 episodes |
| 2019 | BlindDateMe | various roles | 3 episodes |
| 2021 | Arnetia Walker: Just One Step | Self | Television special |
| 2022 | The Jimmy Star Show with Ron Russell | Self (Guest) | S23E6 "Barry Pearl/Marlyn Bandiero" |
| 2022 | Meet the Biz | Self | S3E6 "Barry Pearl - 'To Touch Another Life'" |
| 2022 | The Walls Are Watching | Auctioneer Sims | TV movie |
| 2022 | The Actor's Choice | Self | S8E41 "Bertila Damas, Barry Pearl and Jeff Stetson" |
| 2023 | 2 Cops and a Car | Sgt. Seumas Shillingshaw | S3E2 "Case File: Willy 'WiFi' Witzsimmons: Day 13" |
| 2024 | Nobody Wants This | Abe | S1E2 "A Shiksa Walks Into a Temple" |
| 2025 | Live from Detroit: The Jeff Dwoskin Show | Self (Guest) | Episode #376: "Grease Is Still the Word at 47: Barry Pearl Remembers the Magic" |
