= Paula Cizmar =

American academic, playwright and librettist

Paula Cizmar is an American academic, playwright and librettist.

Cizmar's work has been selected for EnVision, the Sundance Theatre Lab, and the O’Neill National Playwrights Conference; a National Endowment for the Arts grant; a nomination to The Kilroy List, a Susan Smith Blackburn Prize Special Commendation; and a TCG/Mellon Foundation On the Road grant. .She has served residencies at the Rockefeller Study Center in Bellagio, Italy;

Cizmar's works include The Death of a Miner, Candy & Shelley Go To the Desert, Still Life with Parrot & Monkey, Ghost Dance on Mulholland, Bone Dry, The Last Nights of Scheherazade, January, and Street Stories.

Cizmar is an associate professor at the University of Southern California teaching playwriting.

== Early life ==
Paula was born in Youngstown, Ohio. She grew up in Youngstown, and as a child played piano and wrote poetry. She attended Chaney High School before continuing on to Ohio University where she was in the Honors College. She majored in English and wrote for the Ohio University Post, which led to an internship on the Detroit Free Press, where she covered everything from the courts to crime to feature stories. After holding this position, and a stint writing magazine articles, she changed her focus to solely creative writing endeavors.

== Awards, nominations, and honors ==
- Awarded three Critics Picks for Playwrights Arena production of Street Stories.
- Earned an NEA grant and Susan Smith Blackburn Prize Special Commendation for The Death of a Miner.
- Awarded a National Endowment for the Arts Consortium grant and a Residency Fellowship at Bard College for the collaborative work Seven.
- She was selected for an international residency at the Rockefeller Study Center in Bellagio, Italy.
- Had her work chosen for O’Neill National Playwrights Conference, Sundance Theatre Lab, and EnVision at Bard College.
- Received a TCG/Mellon Foundation On the Road grant for work on the play Salvage/Spasiti.
- Awarded the Outstanding Instructor of the Year award in 2003 for screenwriting at UCLA Extension Writers Program.
- Awarded the Mellon Mentoring Award at the University of Southern California.
- Selected for the 2016 Mach 33 Festival of Science-Driven plays for The Chisera.
- Selected for 2018 Lab Results at Antaeus Theatre for Along the River, Almost Winter.

== Career ==
Cizmar co-authored the documentary theatre piece Seven, with Carol K. Mack, Catherine Filloux, Gail Kriegel, Ruth Margraff, Susan Yankowitz, and Anna Deavere Smith. Seven has been produced at the 18th Istanbul International Theatre Festival, and has been translated in over 20 languages. It has also been performed in Amman, Jordan, Tokyo, Japan, Riga, Latvia, and Rabat, Morocco. Seven has been recorded by LA Theatre Works and was named Best Audio Book, memoir category, in 2017.

The Death of a Miner was produced at the American Place Theatre by the Women's Project.

Cizmar wrote two seasons for the television series American Family.

Cizmar's plays have been produced at the San Diego Rep, the Jungle Theater, Playwrights Arena, off-Broadway, Theatre LaBeet, Passage Theatre, and Portland Stage.

Cizmar collaborated on The Hotel Play, which was produced on the grounds of the downtown LA Radisson Hotel in 2017.

Scenes from Cizmar's opera, The Night Flight of Minerva's Owl were performed at Pittsburgh Festival Opera in their Music That Matters program in both 2018 and 2019. The opera premieres in 2020.

Cizmer held playwriting residencies at Skidmore College, Ohio University, and Portland Stage.

== Plays Written by Cizmar ==
- Still Life with Parrot & Monkey
- Ghost Dance on Mulholland
- Boodaboy
- river: post-futurist
- Street Stories
- January
- The Death of a Miner (1982)
- Candy & Shelley Go to the Desert
- ¡Goat Springs Eternal!
- Last Nights of Scheherazade
- The Chisera (a.k.a. Lost Borders)
- Strawberry
- Yerba Buena
- Night Vision
- Bone Dry (2005)
- Down 4 the Count
- The Girl Room (1978)
- Madonna of the Powder Room (1981)
- Chalk
- Cupcakes

Collaborations

- Seven
- The Box
- Venus in Orange
- 7 Sins in 60 Minutes
- The Hotel Play

Screenplays

- M.U.T.H.R.
- Tough Girls
- The Voyage of the Mimi
