= Diane Hunter =

Diane Hunter may refer to:

- Diane Hunter (model) (1934–2019), American model, Playboy Playmate of November 1954
- Diane Hunter, a fictional character in Designated Survivor (TV series)
- Diane Hunter, a fictional character in Crossroads (British TV series)
- Diane Hunter, a fictional character in Days of Our Lives
- Diane Hunter, a fictional character in The Fosters (season 5)
