= Andy Bean =

Andy Bean may refer to:

- Andy Bean (golfer)
- Andy Bean (actor)
