= Chris Warren (actor) =

American actor

- Born: Christopher Warren Jr.
- Occupation: Actor
- Years active: 1999–present
- Spouse: Layla Kayleigh (m. 2019)
- Children: 1
- Parent: Brook Kerr (mother)

Christopher Warren Jr. is an American actor. He is best known as Zeke Baylor in the High School Musical franchise, Ty in The Fosters and Jason Parker in Grand Hotel. Since 2020 he has played Hayden in BET TV series Sistas.

== Career ==
Warren has been featured in such movies as 2000's Love & Basketball. From 2004 to 2005, he played Jimmy Ramírez on the soap opera The Bold and the Beautiful. Some of his television credits include guest appearances on Just Jordan and Zoey 101. Chris first appeared as Zeke in High School Musical and reprised the role in High School Musical 2, and High School Musical 3: Senior Year.

He guest starred in Good Luck Charlie which starred his co-star Bridgit Mendler from Alvin and the Chipmunks: The Squeakquel. In 2017, Warren starred in the Jason Michael Brescia film (Romance) In the Digital Age. In 2019, he took on the role of Jason Parker in the ABC television series Grand Hotel. In 2020, he was cast as Hayden Moss, on Sistas, on BET.

== Personal life ==
Chris Warren is the son of Christopher Warren Sr. and actress Brook Kerr.

== Filmography ==
=== Film ===
Year	Title	Role	Notes
2000	Shoe Shine Boys	Witness	
2000	Men of Honor	Young Carl Brashear	
2000	Love & Basketball	Kelvin	
2005	American Gun	Marcus	
2008	High School Musical 3: Senior Year	Zeke Baylor	
2009	Alvin and the Chipmunks: The Squeakquel	Xander	
2017	(Romance) in the Digital Age	Marcellus Roberts	
2023	Ruined	Landon Richards	

=== Television ===
Year	Title	Role	Notes
1999	Becker	Rob	Episode: "He Said, She Said"
2004–2005	The Bold and the Beautiful	Jimmy Ramirez	Recurring role
2005	Zoey 101	Darrell	2 episodes
2005	Unfabulous	Jim	Episode: "The Balancing Act"
2005	The Bernie Mac Show	Jason	Episode: "What Would Jason Do?"
2006	High School Musical	Zeke Baylor	Television film
2007	Just Jordan	Critter	Episode: "Critter Is Buggin"
2007	High School Musical 2	Zeke Baylor	Television film
2008	Depth Charge	James Piersall	Television film
2010–2011	The Hard Times of RJ Berger	Patterson	Recurring role
2011	Good Luck Charlie	Justin	Episode: "Snow Show"
2012	The Inbetweeners	Darius Hill	Episode: "The Masters"
2015–2016	The Fosters	Ty Hensdale	Recurring role (season 3–4)
2019	Grand Hotel	Jason Parker	Main role
2020–present	Sistas	Hayden Moss	Recurring role (season 2–4); main role (season 5–present)
2023	Grey's Anatomy	Brandon Marwood	Episode: "Pick Yourself up"
