= Joseph Booton =

Joseph Booton may refer to:

- Joseph F. Booton (1897–1983), American architect
- Joseph Booton (actor) (born 1987), British actor
