= Annet Mahendru =

American actress (born 1985)

- Born: Anita Devi Mahendru; November 5, 1985 (age 40); Kabul, Afghanistan
- Citizenship: United States
- Education: St. John’s University
- Occupation: Actress
- Years active: 2007–present
- Spouse: Louie Gibson
- Children: 2
- Website: www.annetmahendru.com

Anita Devi "Annet" Mahendru (born November 5, 1985) is an American actress. She is known for playing Nina Sergeevna Krilova on the FX period drama series The Americans (2013–2016), which earned her a Critics' Choice Award nomination in 2014; and as Jennifer "Huck" Mallick in the AMC series The Walking Dead: World Beyond in 2020.

== Early life and education ==
Annet Mahendru was born on November 5, 1985, in Kabul, Afghanistan. Her mother, Olga, is Russian, and her father, Ghanshan "Ken" Mahendru, is a Punjabi Hindu Indian educator and journalist, who studied at Kabul University and later met her mother while working in Russia. The Mahendru family moved to Kabul where her grandfather had a sweets business. Mahendru's grandmother originally hailed from Nepal.

Mahendru had what she calls a "gypsy" childhood, spending her first seven years of her childhood between Afghanistan and Saint Petersburg. She then lived with her mother in St. Petersburg and regularly travelled between there and Frankfurt, before moving with her father to East Meadow, New York, at age 13, after her parents separated. Mahendru attended East Meadow High School, where she was active in competitive cheerleading and kick line teams; she graduated in 2004. She went on to earn an English degree from St. John's University in New York City.

Mahendru grew up speaking Persian, Russian, German and English, and also speaks conversational Hindi and French. She also uses Dari to speak with her relatives. She initially wanted to use what she has called her "ethnic ambiguity" to work for the United Nations. She was enrolled at New York University for a master's degree in international relations as she wanted to work for the women in Afghanistan, but dropped out to pursue acting. She then moved to Los Angeles and studied improv at The Groundlings.

== Career ==
In 2007, Mahendru appeared in an episode of the HBO comedy-drama Entourage. She started her career as a model starring in various commercials and Persian music videos. Her next significant roles came in 2011, in episodes of the sitcoms Big Time Rush and 2 Broke Girls. In 2012, she starred in an episode of the sitcom Mike & Molly. In 2013, Mahendru played Nina Sergeevna Krilova in the FX drama The Americans, appeared in an episode of the crime series White Collar, and played Agent Rosen in two episodes of the crime drama The Blacklist. She starred in the unapproved Disney film Escape from Tomorrow, which is set in Walt Disney World.

In 2014, Mahendru was promoted to a series regular for the second season of The Americans. She also starred in the comedy-drama film Bridge and Tunnel, had a voice role in the 2014 animated film Penguins of Madagascar, and guest-starred in the 2016 X-Files miniseries as Sveta, a possible UFO abductee. She played Nafisa Al-Qadi on the FX series Tyrant.

Mahendru stars in the title role of the independent feature film Sally Pacholok (2015), which premiered at and won Best Feature at the DC Independent Film Festival, in Washington, DC.

Mahendru has also performed at theatre works at LATW. In 2017, she performed in Seven as an Afghan refugee and women's rights activist Farida Azizi at the LA Theatre Works. The play was a collaboration between 7 playwrights and female activists each from around the globe that portrays inspiring stories of overcoming adversities to bring about real change and improve the lives of women.

Mahendru stars in the seventh episode of the anthology series The Romanoffs, which began streaming on Amazon Video on November 16, 2018.

She plays a lead role as Jennifer "Huck" Mallick in the AMC series The Walking Dead: World Beyond, which premiered in 2020.

In 2025, Mahendru played her first Indian role as Reena Trivedi in Leverage: Redemption.

== Personal life ==
Mahendru is married to Australian filmmaker Louie Gibson. The couple have a son (born c. 2018).

Despite both her parents' families not being from Afghanistan and having lived across the world since she was young, Mahendru maintains strong ties to her Indian and Russian roots as well as her connection to her birthplace, stating in 2022:

I feel my Afghan roots deeply in my temperament, as I do my Indian and Russian colours. I feel at home equally at an Afghan wedding as I do at Holi or Fourth of July.

== Filmography ==
Key
†	Denotes productions that have not yet been released

=== Film ===
Year	Title	Role	Notes
2009	Erza: Fear of a Faceless God	Erza	Debut
2010	Duel of the Overmen	Ausler	Short film
2011	El Padrino II: Border Intrusion	Serge's Wife	
2011	Love, Gloria	Katie	
2011	Missed Call	Steph	Short film
2011	Almaz	Natasha	Short film
2012	Got Rights?	Afghan Woman	Short film
2012	Captain Planet 3	Script Girl	Short film
2012	Captain Planet 4	Script Girl	Short film
2013	Escape from Tomorrow	Isabelle	
2013	Metropolitan Stories	Esmeralda	Short film
2014	Bridge and Tunnel	Kelly Jones	
2014	Smokey Eyes	Barbara	Short film
2014	Penguins of Madagascar	Eva	Voice
2015	Sally Pacholok	Sally Pacholok	
2022	Father Stu	Virgin Mary	
2022	Manifest West	Alice Hayes	
2023	Jack London’s Martin Eden	Lizzie Connolly	
2026	Return from Tomorrow	Flora	
2026	The Fix	Sophie	
2026	Grow	Kitty / Locasta	

=== Television ===
Year	Title	Role	Notes
2007	Entourage	French Girlfriend	Uncredited; Episode: "The Cannes Kids"
2011	Big Time Rush	Princess Svetlana	Episode: "Big Time Wedding"
2011	2 Broke Girls	Robin	Episode: "And the Pop-Up Sale"
2012	Mike & Molly	Flight Attendant	Episode: "The Honeymoon is Over"
2013–2016	The Americans	Nina Sergeevna Krilova	35 episodes Nominated—Critics' Choice Television Award for Best Supporting Actress in a Drama Series
2013	The Blacklist	Agent Rosen	2 episodes
2013	White Collar	Katya	Episode: "Ice Breaker"
2014	Grey's Anatomy	Ana	Episode: "Only Mama Knows"
2015	The Following	Eliza	4 episodes
2016	The X-Files	Sveta	Episode: "My Struggle: Part 1"
2016	Tyrant	Nafisa Al-Qadi	8 episodes
2017	Pickle & Peanut	Mia	1 episode
2017	Neo Yokio	Mila Malevich	2 episodes
2018	Lethal Weapon	Layla Khudari	Episode: "Get the Picture"
2018	The Romanoffs	Elena Evanovich	Episode: "End of the Line"
2020–2021	The Walking Dead: World Beyond	Jennifer "Huck" Mallick	Main role; 18 episodes
2020	Prodigal Son	Fiona	Episode: "Scheherazade"
2023	True Lies	Yelena	Episode: "Waking Dreams"
2025	Leverage: Redemption	Reena Trivedi	Season 3 Episode 6 : "The Swipe Right Job"

=== Theatre ===
Year	Title	Role	Notes
–	Twelve Angry Jurors	Juror 11	The Underground Theatre, LA
2017	Seven	Farida Azizi	LATW

=== Music videos ===
Year	Song	Singer(s)	Language	Ref.
2008	"Mojezeh"	Rastin	Persian	

== Awards and nominations ==
Year	Award	Category	Work	Result	Ref
2014	Critics' Choice Television Award	Best Supporting Actress in a Drama	The Americans	Nominated	
2014	Gold Derby TV Award	Best Supporting Actress in a Drama	The Americans	Nominated	
2014	Laugh or Die Comedy Festival	Best Supporting Actress	Bridge and Tunnel	Nominated	
2014	Long Beach International Film Festival	Best Supporting Actress	Bridge and Tunnel	Nominated	
2014	Northeast Film Festival	Best Supporting Actress	Bridge and Tunnel	Nominated	
2014	Showbiz India's Trailblazer award	'Emerging Leader' as a rising South Asian Female Actor in Hollywood	Herself	Won	
2015	Television, Internet and Video Association of DC (TIVA-DC) Peer Awards	Acting on Camera - Fiction, Female - Gold	Sally Pacholok	Won	
