= Swamp Thing (2019 TV series) =

American superhero television series

- Genre: Superhero; Horror; Science fiction
- Based on: Swamp Thing by: Len Wein; Bernie Wrightson
- Developed by: Gary Dauberman; Mark Verheiden
- Starring: Crystal Reed; Virginia Madsen; Andy Bean; Derek Mears; Henderson Wade; Maria Sten; Jeryl Prescott; Will Patton; Jennifer Beals; Kevin Durand
- Composer: Brian Tyler
- Country of origin: United States
- Original language: English
- No. of seasons: 1
- No. of episodes: 10

Production
- Executive producers: Len Wiseman; Gary Dauberman; Mark Verheiden; James Wan; Michael Clear
- Producer: Terry Gould
- Production location: Wilmington, North Carolina
- Cinematography: Pedro Luque; Fernando Argüelles; Nathaniel Goodman; Peter Kowalski
- Editors: Mark Stevens; Scott Draper; Tim Mirkovich; Hector Carrillo
- Running time: 42–60 minutes
- Production companies: Big Shoe Productions, Inc.; Atomic Monster; DC Entertainment; Warner Bros. Television

Original release
- Network: DC Universe
- Release: May 31 – August 2, 2019

Swamp Thing is an American superhero horror television series created by Gary Dauberman and Mark Verheiden for DC Universe, based on the DC Comics character of the same name. The series follows medical doctor Abby Arcane (Crystal Reed) encountering the eponymous Swamp Thing (Derek Mears), a plant-elemental creature who fights malevolent forces around a Louisiana swamp.

The series premiered on May 31, 2019, and consisted of 10 episodes. Shortly after its premiere, DC Universe announced that Swamp Thing had been canceled. The remaining episodes were released on DC Universe until the series' conclusion on August 2, 2019. The series received positive reviews from critics, particularly for the series' horror elements and practical monster effects.

== Premise ==
Abby Arcane returns home to Marais, Louisiana, to investigate a deadly swamp-borne virus, where she develops a bond with disgraced scientist Alec Holland. After Holland tragically dies, Abby discovers the mysteries of the swamp and that Holland might not be dead after all.

== Cast and characters ==
=== Main ===
- Crystal Reed as Abigail "Abby" Arcane:
  A CDC doctor investigating a horrific life-threatening epidemic in her hometown while facing her past again. Melissa Collazo portrays teenage Abby.
- Virginia Madsen as Maria Sunderland:
  The wife of Avery Sunderland, whose grief over the loss of her daughter, Shawna, resurfaces when Abby returns home, and draws Maria into the supernatural mysteries of the swamp.
- Andy Bean as Alec Holland:
  A disgraced biologist working for Avery. Murdered when he starts to uncover an illegal operation in the swamp, his memories survive inside of Swamp Thing.
- Derek Mears as Swamp Thing:
  A plant-based entity created from the memories of Alec Holland. Possessing elemental control of vegetation and regenerative abilities, he attempts to defend the swamp, the town, and the natural world at large.
- Henderson Wade as Matt Cable:
  A police officer along with his mother, Lucilia, who finds himself in dire straits when supernatural events begin to threaten the town. He is also a childhood friend of Abby.
- Maria Sten as Liz Tremayne:
  A local newspaper reporter and bartender who is a close childhood friend of Abby Arcane.
- Jeryl Prescott as Nimue Inwudu / Xanadu:
  A blind fortune teller whose psychic abilities can reveal the future.
- Will Patton as Avery Sunderland:
  A prominent businessman in Marais, who, while publicly giving back to the community, is determined to harness the power of the swamp for profit as a pharmaceutical cornucopia. He was also the adoptive parent to Abby Arcane after her mother died.
- Jennifer Beals as Lucilia Cable:
  The "tough as nails and pragmatic" sheriff of Marais with a strong devotion to her son, Matt.
- Kevin Durand as Jason Woodrue:
  A biogeneticist, brought in to study the properties of the swamp, leading him to become fixated on unlocking its potential.

=== Recurring ===
- Leonardo Nam as Harlan Edwards: A CDC specialist who is Abby's second-in-command
- Elle Graham as Susie Coyle: A young girl who is diagnosed with "Green Flu", appears to have a mysterious connection to Swamp Thing, and befriends Abby
- Given Sharp as Shawna Sunderland: Abby's childhood friend and Maria and Avery's deceased daughter, who appears in both flashbacks and as a ghost to her mother Maria
- Ian Ziering as Daniel Cassidy / Blue Devil: A former stuntman who, after becoming semi-famous playing the demonic Blue Devil in a film, looks to regain his former fame
- Selena Anduze as Caroline Woodrue: A scientist and Jason Woodrue's wife who has Alzheimer's disease
- Macon Blair as Phantom Stranger
- Al Mitchell as Delroy Tremayne: Liz's father
- Michael Beach as Nathan Ellery

=== Guest ===
- RJ Cyler as Jones
- Tim Russ as Dr. Chowodury, a doctor at the Marais hospital
- Micah Fitzgerald as Munson / the Rot
- Adrienne Barbeau as Dr. Palomar, the assistant director of the CDC. Barbeau previously appeared in the 1982 film adaptation of Swamp Thing as Alice Cable, an amalgamation of Abby Arcane and Matt Cable.
- Jake Busey as Shaw

== Episodes ==
No.	Title	Directed by	Written by	Original release date	Prod. code
1	"Pilot"	Len Wiseman	Teleplay by : Gary Dauberman & Mark Verheiden	May 31, 2019	T33.01008
In a swamp outside of Marais, Louisiana, three men hired to drop cases of mutagen accelerator into Bayou Swamp are attacked by plants, with only one of them surviving. Days later, the survivor's daughter, Susie, comes down with a mysterious illness that has been spreading throughout town. CDC doctor and former resident Abby Arcane, is sent to help. She reunites with childhood friend turned policeman, Matthew Cable, before meeting with Alec Holland, a disgraced scientist hired by businessman Avery Sunderland, to investigate further. The pair find the survivor's body overrun with a plant creature, though Alec kills it. After meeting up with Abby's reporter friend, Liz Tremayne, and being accosted by Maria Sunderland, the pair find the mutagen cases. While waiting for the results, Alec and Abby bond, revealing he had manipulated test results to prove himself right and she was responsible for killing Sunderland's daughter, Shawna. After getting the results, Alec departs alone to find more of the cases, only to be violently killed and taken by the swamp. Abby rushes to find him, only to be scared off by a mossy creature.
2	"Worlds Apart"	Len Wiseman	Mark Verheiden & Doris Egan	June 7, 2019	T33.10352
The police investigate Alec's death, but disregard Abby's claims. Maria meets with Madame Xanadu, who advises her against finding her daughter's spirit and that she should put her regrets to rest. She refuses to however, later resting on Shawna's bed next to her daughter's corpse. Not long after biogeneticist Jason Woodrue and his wife, Caroline, arrive in Marais, the former meets with Avery, who berates him for the mutagen spreading disease instead of cultivating the swamp for land development like he wanted. Jason disagrees, claiming it is incapable of doing so, but Avery forces him to investigate the disease regardless. Susie dreams of a plant-like creature clawing at its body and feeling how scared it was. She later escapes the hospital and into the swamp, where she sees two men dumping more mutagen and killing an officer. One of the men, Munson, spots her and gives chase when she flees, only to be killed by the creature. Abby catches up to them while looking for Susie, who says the creature is Alec and he is confused as to what is happening.
3	"He Speaks"	Deran Sarafian	Rob Fresco	June 14, 2019	T33.10353
Munson's body is resurrected by killer insects. Abby confides in Liz that the "Swamp Thing" is Alec. Abby later breaks into Alec's lab and finds what he was working on. Munson attacks her, but she is saved by the Swamp Thing, who orders the insects to release Munson. Abby tries to reason with Alec, but when he says the disease is fighting to protect itself, she realizes that antibiotics make it stronger and uses immuno-suppressants to temporarily save the infected. Liz confronts loan officer Gordon about him secretly paying Avery, but he denies this. He later demands Avery return the payments or else he will talk. Matt's mother, Lucilia, interviews Avery about Alec's death, hinting at their past relationship. Shawna's ghost confronts Maria about Avery's infidelity. Avery attempts to procure funds from Maria's inheritance, but she denies him. Meanwhile, Daniel Cassidy expresses his desire to leave Marais, learning from Xanadu that change is coming. Liz's girlfriend discovers a piece of Alec's boat. When Gordon threatens to expose the Conclave, Avery kills him.
4	"Darkness on the Edge of Town"	Carol Banker	Erin Maher & Kay Reindl	June 21, 2019	T33.10354
A young man named Todd discovers a corpse hidden in a tree and unknowingly becomes infected. While working for Liz's father's, Delroy, Todd hallucinates and kills himself in the resulting panic, though not before scratching Delroy. Abby meets with Alec and obtains a sample of his tissue to study, with Jason's assistance. Delroy begins to hallucinate a mysterious man and panics. While Lucilia, Liz, and Abby restrain him, Lucilia gets scratched. While Avery holds a celebration for the "plant flu's" end, Maria attempts to get closer to the recovering Susie. Abby investigates the area where Todd was infected, finding the corpse and a hotel key. Liz looks up the hotel and learns of a similar incident in the past wherein the final victim vanished into the swamp. Abby theorizes they did this knowing they were infected. At the party, Lucilia sees a vision of Matt dying and attempts to shoot his "attacker" before Daniel disarms her. She scratches Abby, who rushes into the swamp. As she hallucinates a tall, faceless man trying to kidnap her, Alec arrives and cures her before returning the disease to the corpse before confirming Abby's theory. Avery and Maria decide to take care of Susie instead of her uncle.
5	"Drive All Night"	Greg Beeman	Franklin Rho	June 28, 2019	T33.10355
Swamp Thing meets a mysterious being, who tells him that the ghosts he has been seeing were events witnessed by past trees. Susie is possessed by Shawna's ghost and lures Maria to the swamp. Abby follows Maria and tries to save her, but Maria nearly drowns Abby, who manages to swim away. Shawna's ghost tries to drown Maria in turn, but Swamp Thing saves her. With Swamp Thing's help, Abby discovers that Shawna was killed by an evil force that pulled her underwater. Avery threatens Liz to stop investigating Alec's death, but she refuses. Daniel tries to leave Marais, but his arm bursts into blue flames at the border. Jason searches Alec's lab and finds giant footprints that lead to a piece of vegetation. After analyzing it, he concludes that it has the same genetic material as Abby's sample. Jason later tells Avery that a large creature is living in the swamp and that he needs it alive so he can study it. Avery obliges, offering the name of someone who can help him.
6	"The Price You Pay"	Toa Fraser	Tania Lotia	July 5, 2019	T33.10356
Avery's trackers try to capture Swamp Thing, but he defends himself against them. Lucilia sends Matt to investigate, who tracks down Swamp Thing in the process and fights him. Abby stops them, revealing to Matt that the creature is Alec. Matt confesses to Lucilia that he killed Alec on Avery's behalf to protect her. Liz tells Abby that the thugs who attacked her and Daniel were sent by Avery. When Abby confronts Avery over Liz's allegations, he hints at possible retribution. A comatose Daniel remembers the deal that he made with the Phantom Stranger that resulted in his being trapped in Marais. Jason manages to awaken Daniel, but his experiments on him almost transform the failed actor into a blue devil-like monster before Caroline sedates him. Xanadu visits Daniel and relieves his pain. Swamp Thing grows a hallucinogenic flower that makes Abby temporarily see him as Alec.
7	"Brilliant Disguise"	Alexis Ostrander	Conway Preston & Rob Fresco	July 12, 2019	T33.10357
Abby and Alec head to a rotted area of swamp. While she is collecting a sample, the darkness attacks and infects her with bacteria. Alec takes Abby back to his lab, where she is saved by the Green. Lucilia tells Avery that Alec is still alive and asks him to help her take Alec down before he comes for them. While searching the swamp, Avery betrays Lucilia and steals her shotgun. Just as Avery is about to shoot Lucilia, Matt surprises him and knocks him out. When Avery wakes up, he tells Matt that he is his father, and Matt gets angry at Lucilia for not telling him. While he is distracted, Avery stabs him. Lucilia shoots Avery in the leg, causing him to fall into the swamp. Alec tells Abby that his transformation is serving a higher purpose, and that she should move on with her life and not come back anymore. Abby goes to the CDC in Atlanta to try to find a cure for him before it is too late. An injured Avery emerges from the water and onto the shore.
8	"Long Walk Home"	E. L. Katz	Doris Egan	July 19, 2019	T33.10358
A wounded Avery wanders through the swamp. Losing blood, he begins to hallucinate. Swamp Thing finds him, brings him to the lab, and helps him recover. Abby is denied access to her sample results. Afterwards, she is confronted by the Conclave. Harlan is kidnapped after leaving Abby's apartment. Avery returns the next day with Jason to "help" Swamp Thing, though he has also secretly brought Conclave mercenaries with him. Swamp Thing tries to make them leave, but the Conclave manage to capture him. Sensing that Swamp Thing is in danger, Abby heads back to Marais, but arrives too late.
9	"The Anatomy Lesson"	Michael Goi	Teleplay by : Mark Verheiden; Story by : Noah Griffith & Daniel Stewart	July 26, 2019	T33.10359
At a secret Conclave facility, Jason conducts research on Swamp Thing, discovering that he can function without vital organs. As payback for trying to kill him, Avery bribes a judge to commit Maria to a mental institution. Upon further examination, Jason deduces that Swamp Thing is actually a humanoid plant that absorbed Holland's memories after he died. Abby and Liz locate the facility. Daniel recovers and the Phantom Stranger shows him a vision of Liz and Abby being hunted and killed by Conclave security. Inspired, he decides to become the Blue Devil. Abby and Liz are able to free Swamp Thing while the Blue Devil takes out the guards, but Jason manages to escape. Returning home, he finds Caroline has overdosed. Swamp Thing returns to the swamp and retrieves a skeleton. A horrified Abby looks on as Swamp Thing confirms the body belongs to Alec.
10	"Loose Ends"	Deran Sarafian	Teleplay by : Erin Maher & Kay Reindl; Story by : Rob Fresco	August 2, 2019	T33.10360
Despite recovering Alec's body, Abby tries to make Swamp Thing believe that Holland's spirit resides within him. Nathan and his men attack, but Swamp Thing kills them, sparing only Nathan. Swamp Thing has one last conversation with Alec. Jason performs an experiment on himself to save his wife. Xanadu visits Maria in the mental institution and gives her closure, though at the cost of her sanity. Avery tries to reconcile with Lucilia, but when she refuses, he stabs her and dumps her car in the swamp with her in the trunk. After talking with Liz, Daniel is finally able to leave Marais. Swamp Thing and Abby decide to remain in Marais to combat the encroaching darkness together. Matt arrives at the station, only to find his fellow police officers dead. Jason, mutated by his experiment, attacks him.

== Production ==
=== Development ===
In May 2018, DC Universe gave the production a script-to-series order. Mark Verheiden and Gary Dauberman were attached to write the first episode of the series and executive produce alongside James Wan and Michael Clear. Rob Hackett served as a co-producer. Production companies included Atomic Monster and Warner Bros. Television. Len Wiseman directed the series' first episode in addition to serving as an executive producer.

Despite being released on DC Universe, the series does not exist in the same fictional universe as the service's other live-action series, including Titans and Doom Patrol. On June 6, 2019, the series was canceled one week after its premiere aired.

=== Casting ===
In September 2018, Crystal Reed and Maria Sten were cast in the main roles of Abby Arcane and Liz Tremayne, respectively. Jennifer Beals was also cast in the recurring role of Sheriff Lucilia Cable, although she would later be revealed to be part of the main cast. More series regulars were later revealed, with Jeryl Prescott cast as Madame Xanadu, Virginia Madsen as Maria Sunderland, Will Patton as Avery Sunderland, Andy Bean as Alec Holland with Derek Mears as the Swamp Thing, Henderson Wade as Matt Cable, and Kevin Durand as Jason Woodrue. Ian Ziering joined the cast in the recurring role of Daniel Cassidy / Blue Devil, and Leonardo Nam was cast as Harlan Edwards in a recurring role.

=== Filming ===
Principal photography for the series commenced in early November 2018 in Wilmington, North Carolina, and wrapped on May 6, 2019.

=== Cancellation ===
In April 2019, production for the series was unexpectedly cut short due to creative differences with DC Universe's parent company WarnerMedia, thus reducing the original episode order from 13 to 10 episodes. Further reports stated that the series was canceled due to budget shortfalls after the expected level of tax rebates offered by the state of North Carolina were substantially reduced. A representative from DC Universe said that the streaming service was being re-evaluated and that there were no plans for a second season. The spokesman did not elaborate explicitly on why specifically the show was canceled.

Mears described the cancellation as a "heartbreaker" and felt the decision to cancel the show showed a "lack of respect" on DC's part. He added that members of the production had been told up until the cancellation "how amazing everything was... So it's a weird nebulous space that we're all in now because we don't know officially why that would happen, or why they canceled it". In mid-2019, a movement with the hashtag #SaveSwampThing began spreading on social media shortly after the series was cancelled in an attempt to save the series. Mears also showed his support of the movement. With The CW network acquiring the broadcast rights to the series, The CW president Mark Pedowitz did not rule out the possibility of renewing the series for a second season, but in January 2021, Pedowitz said it was unlikely the series would return on The CW and also commented that there was a slim possibility of Swamp Thing appearing on other Arrowverse series, such as Legends of Tomorrow.

== Release ==
Swamp Thing premiered May 31, 2019, on DC Universe. Despite being canceled not long after its premiere, DC Universe continued to release the remaining episodes of the series, with the finale being released on August 2, 2019. Swamp Thing: The Complete Series was released digitally on December 2, 2019, and on DVD and Blu-ray on February 11, 2020.

In 2020, The CW acquired the broadcast rights to the series. It began airing on the network from October 6 to December 22 in the same year.

== Reception ==
=== Critical response ===
On Rotten Tomatoes, the series holds a 92% approval rating based on 39 reviews, with an average rating of 7.32/10. The website's critical consensus reads: "By leaning into the horror of it all, Swamp Thing swims deep into the trenches of this strange world and returns with a scary good TV show." Metacritic, which uses a weighted average, assigned the series a score of 69 out of 100 based on reviews from 6 critics, indicating "generally favorable reviews".

David Griffin, writing for IGN, said the series properly "honors the comic book origins" of Swamp Thing and praised the performance of Crystal Reed, Virginia Madsen, and Will Patton, as well as the film-making style of Wiseman. Griffin particularly praised the Swamp Thing's practical suit and found that any CGI used was not distracting. Daniel Fienberg of The Hollywood Reporter praised the creepy atmosphere and found the cast performances to be strong enough to carry episodes even when the monster was not on screen.

In a more mixed review, Kevin Yeoman, writing for Screen Rant, approved of the "nausea-inducing practical effects" reminiscent of John Carpenter's The Thing but criticized the writing and pacing and found the decision to not reveal Swamp Thing until the final moments of the pilot episode to be frustrating. Joel Keller of Decider found the horror elements made up for generic characters and an uninteresting mystery plot line.

=== Accolades ===
The series was nominated at the 2019 Saturn Awards for Best Streaming Superhero Television Series. Matthew Llewellyn as music editor on "The Anatomy Lesson" was nominated for the Outstanding Achievement in Sound Editing – Music Score and Musical for Episodic Short Form Broadcast Media award at the 2019 MPSE Golden Reel Awards.

== Future ==
=== Cancelled spin-off ===
Before the cancellation of the Swamp Thing series, there were plans to introduce Justice League Dark and create a spin-off series based on that team.

=== Arrowverse ===
Swamp Thing, as depicted in the series, makes a cameo appearance in the Arrowverse crossover event "Crisis on Infinite Earths" through archival footage of Mears as the character. The event depicts Swamp Thing as being set on the world of Earth-19.

=== Titans ===
Swamp Thing, as depicted in the series, makes a cameo appearance in the Titans episode "Dude, Where's My Gar?" via archival footage.
