= MILF (2010 film) =

2010 sex comedy film directed by Scott Wheeler

- Extended edition cover
- Directed by: Scott Wheeler
- Written by: Johnny Haug
- Produced by: David Michael Latt; David Rimawi; Paul Bales
- Starring: Jack Cullison; Phillip Marlett; Joseph Booton; Ramon Camacho; Amy Lindsay; Molinee Green
- Cinematography: Mark Atkins
- Edited by: Christian McIntire
- Music by: Chris Ridenhour
- Distributed by: The Asylum
- Release date: October 26, 2010
- Running time: 90 minutes
- Country: United States
- Language: English

MILF is a 2010 sex comedy film by The Asylum. The film aesthetically parodies elements of the American Pie film series and the Revenge of the Nerds series.

== Synopsis ==
After failing romantically with girls their own age, a group of nerdy male college students discover the excitement of hooking up with sexy older women, often referred to as MILFs (mother I'd like to fuck). Lifelong best friends Brandon and Anthony as well as their geek/gamer friends Nate and Ross succeed beyond their wildest dreams as they hook up with lady after lady. However, when Brandon falls for Anthony's sexually active mother, the guys' whole scheme begins to fall apart.

== Cast ==
- Jack Cullison as Brandon Murphy
- Phillip Marlatt as Anthony Reese
- Joseph Booton as Nate Hooligans
- Ramon Camacho as Ross Makhsilumm
- Amy Lindsay as Holly Reese
- Molinee Green as Lori Murphy
- Silvija Durann as Mindy
- Melidia Camren as Renna
- Rachel Riley as Erica
- Jamie Bernadette as Alex
- Diana Terranova as Rhonda

== Reception ==
The film received mostly negative reviews. PopMatters ran a mostly supportive review, giving the film six of ten stars. Critic Bill Gibron commented, "MILF may not be the most endemic example of this company's product, but it's still a glorious, goofy guilty pleasure." He also wrote, "It may not be laugh out loud funny, but is constantly keeps you smiling."
