= Bedtime with Barney: Imagination Island =

- Written by: Stephen White
- Directed by: Jim Rowley
- Starring: David Joyner; Jeff Ayers; Jeff Brooks; Hope Cervantes; Pia Manalo; John David Bennett II; Rickey Carter; Barry Pearl; J.D. Mosley; David J. Courtney
- Voices of: Bob West; Julie Johnson; Carol Farabee; Patty Wirtz
- Ending theme: A Sailor Went to Sea Sea Sea [instrumental]
- Country of origin: United States
- Original language: English

Production
- Running time: 47 minutes
- Production company: The Lyons Group

Original release
- Network: NBC
- Release: April 24, 1994

Bedtime with Barney: Imagination Island is a 1994 special that premiered on NBC on April 24, 1994. It is a spin-off of Barney & Friends and the first video of the series to be shown on prime-time television. The special was released on home video on October 4, 1994.

== Plot ==
Min is having a sleepover at Tosha's house and her mom reads them a story about a mystical place called “Imagination Island”. But she is unable to finish the story when Tosha's baby twin brothers are heard crying. And she lets Tosha and Min play for five minutes and will check to see if they're both in bed by then. When Barney comes to life in Tosha's bed, he shows Tosha and Min that they can go on a sailing adventure if they use their imaginations. And with that, Barney mystically takes them on deck aboard a huge ship destined for Imagination Island. That is, when Tosha and Min's book magically turns Tosha's bedroom closet into a set of stairs (leading them to a real life ship). Along the way, they meet up with Shawn, Derek, Baby Bop, and BJ, but there is just one problem. As the ship sails closer to the island, a big storm causes a huge tidal wave to knock the ship up onto some palm trees on the island.

While BJ and Baby Bop stay on the ship, Barney and the children go explore the island, and with no civilization on the island or ships patrolling the seas in the distance, they must find some help to get off the island. After hiking, patrolling and searching through the island’s jungle, they eventually find a tropical hut where they meet Professor Tinkerputt, a toy inventor who is initially unwilling to share his creations, and thus moved to Imagination Island to be isolated with his toys.

Professor Tinkerputt shows the group his new balloon machine called the “Brilliant Balloon Blower”, which does not properly work, and after he demonstrates his balloon machine, Barney helps him understand that sharing is a good thing.

As a demonstration to sharing, Tosha realizes that her heart shaped necklace is the key to make the balloon machine work, and she gives Professor Tinkerputt her necklace as a solution to the flaw in his balloon machine, thus making it a success. Through the process, Barney helps Professor Tinkerputt understand that sharing with others makes people happy. And by finally sharing different toys with the group, Professor Tinkerputt realizes that making other people happy makes him happy, too.

Wanting to leave the island himself, Professor Tinkerputt agrees to help the gang get off the island, and after a moment of thinking, he gets an idea of how to get the ship out of the trees: They can fly back with help from his balloon machine.

By sunset, the group returns to the ship where Professor Tinkerputt inflates many super giant-sized balloons to attach to the ship. He then takes control of the ship, and it flies up to the evening sky. Hours later, when the ship reaches back home, Barney reminds the children the importance of home, and Barney and the children leave.

Later, Tosha and Min are transported back to Tosha's bedroom, Barney turns back into his doll form, and the entrance door to the ship turns back into Tosha's bedroom closet. Then Tosha's mom comes in and reminds Tosha and Min that it's been five minutes and now it's bedtime, though Tosha and Min giggle quietly as they knew their adventure to Imagination Island was much longer than five minutes and like if time froze around them and it never passed at all. Finally, Tosha and Min head off to sleep after saying goodnight to Barney, and the ship sails off into the night sky with Tinkerputt heading to build his new toy workshop away from the island.

== Cast ==
- David Joyner as Barney (body costume)
- Bob West as Barney (voice)
- Jeff Ayers as Baby Bop (body costume)
- Julie Johnson (singing)/Carol Farabee (speaking) as Baby Bop (voice)
- Jeff Brooks as BJ (body costume)
- Patty Wirtz as BJ (voice)
- Barry Pearl as Professor Tinkerputt
- Hope Cervantes as Tosha
- Pia Manalo as Min
- John David Bennett II as Shawn
- Rickey Carter as Derek
- J.D. Mosley as Tosha's Mom
- David J. Courtney as Tosha's Dad
- Ray Henry as Parrot Puppeteer

== Songs ==
- "Just Imagine"
- "Sea Medley ("Sailing, Sailing", "Row, Row, Row Your Boat", "Blow the Man Down", "My Blankie Lies Over the Ocean" and "A Sailor Went to Sea")"
- "That's What an Island Is"
- "Jungle Adventure"
- "Tinkerputt's Song"
- "If You're Happy and You Know It"
- "Just Imagine" (Reprise)
- "It's Good to Be Home"

== Production ==
In June 1992, the same time that Barney & Friends was initially cancelled, creators Sheryl Leach and Kathy Parker were contacted by CBS about doing a fall prime-time special based on the show.

In April 1993, it surfaced that two television networks were bidding the rights to a prime time special based on Barney & Friends that was scheduled to be released in Winter 1994. In September 1993 it was announced that The Lyons Group was negotiating with four commercial networks for a prime-time Barney special that was now moved up to Spring 1994.

Production for this video took place in February 1994 at Mercury Studios in Las Colinas, Irving, Texas. During production of this video, a lawsuit revolving around the song "I Love You" occurred. Unlike other Barney videos, "I Love You" was not sung due to the lawsuit but also to give the video a separate identity.

=== Casting ===
Julie Johnson was not on set during production due to an off-Broadway gig she received at the time the video was being filmed. Carol Farabee replaced her as the voice of Baby Bop but soon returned to dub over the actresses lines, due to the NBC network wanting the continuity to continue from the television series. This explains why both actresses were listed in the end credits for voicing that said character.

== Release ==
=== Broadcast ===
Airing at 7:00 p.m. Eastern Standard Time, the airing of Imagination Island on NBC was sponsored by JCPenney. 7.7 million American households watched the original broadcast on NBC but the special scored 4.6 in ratings and ranked eighty-seventh (out of eighty-nine) in prime-time ratings. Imagination Island only attracted 9% of preschoolers upon its premiere.

=== Home media ===
Prior to the release of Imagination Island on home video, The Lyons Group hosted a screening of the video at the 1994 VSDA conference in Las Vegas, Nevada for their VSDA Island Party event that took place on July 26, 1994 from 5:00 p.m. to 7:00 p.m. at the Las Vegas Hilton in Ballroom C. Following the event was a sing along appearance and keepsake photo with Barney.

Imagination Island was available for pre-order on home video on September 14, 1994. It was available on October 4, 1994 at a suggested retail price of $14.95. In 2001, this special was featured in the Blockbuster Exclusive video, Barney's Island Safari along with Let's Go to the Zoo. In 2007, it was released with the video The Land of Make Believe by 20th Century Fox Home Entertainment and HIT Entertainment under the Kids' Double Features banner.
