= Susan McKay =

Irish writer and journalist

Susan McKay (born 1957) is an Irish writer, journalist and documentary filmmaker.

== Biography ==
Born in Derry, in Northern Ireland, McKay moved to Dublin in 1975 to study at Trinity College, Dublin (TCD). In 1981, she moved to Belfast to write her PhD at The Queen's University of Belfast but instead became one of the founding members of the Belfast Rape Crisis Centre. Thereafter, she worked on a number of community development projects before becoming a full-time journalist in 1989.

McKay was social affairs correspondent, and later Northern Ireland editor, for the Sunday Tribune. during which she won a number of awards, including Print Journalist of the Year in 2000 and Feature Writer of the Year

In 1998, she published her first book, Sophia's Story the biography of a survivor of child abuse Other books include Northern Protestants – An Unsettled People, McKay has described as "a study of the people I uneasily call my own." and Bear in Mind These Dead a history of the Troubles from the perspective of those who were bereaved.

From 2009 to 2012, McKay was CEO of the National Women's Council of Ireland, but resigned in protest at a cut by the government of 40% of the organisation's funds.

She has produced award-winning documentaries for radio and television, including The Daughter's Story, about the daughters of Fran O'Toole, one of the victims of the Miami Showband Massacre in 1975, and Inez, A Challenging Woman about Northern Irish trade union leader and human rights activist Inez McCormack.

She currently writes for The Guardian/The Observer, The New York Times, The Irish Times and the London Review of Books.

She was awarded with an Honorary Doctor in Letters at Trinity College, Dublin on December 1, 2023. The citation stated: "Susan McKay is a powerful writer and journalist with a distinctive voice of her own, as is evident to anyone who reads her features in The Irish Times, The Guardian, or the London Review of Books, The New Yorker, or the New York Times - but just as striking is her ability to listen. Her recent appointment as Irish Press Ombudsman is a testament to her exceptional integrity".

In 2024, she was made a member of the Royal Irish Academy.

== Books ==
- Northern Protestants: On Shifting Ground (Blackstaff Press Ltd, 2021) ISBN 978-1780732640
- From Belfast to Basra, and Back Again (Grosvenor House Publishing, 2013) ISBN 978-1781486528
- Bear in Mind These Dead (Faber & Faber, 2008) ISBN 978-0571236961
- Without Fear – 25 Years of the Dublin Rape Crisis Centre (New Island Books, 2005) ISBN 978-1904301875
- Northern Protestants – An Unsettled People (Blackstaff Press Ltd, 2000) ISBN 978-0856406669
- Sophia's Story (Gill & Macmillan Ltd, 1998) ISBN 978-0717137923
