= Farida Azizi =

Afghani peace and women's rights advocate

Farida Azizi is an Afghan advocate for peace and women's rights. Azizi has consulted with President George W. Bush and Hillary Clinton on women's roles in helping to rebuild Afghanistan. Azizi is a founding member of the Corporation for Peace and Unity in Afghanistan and is a member of the Afghan Women's Network. She one of the subjects of a play, Seven.

== Biography ==
Azizi was born into a wealthy and important family of the Azizi Pashtuns, sub-clan of the Kheshgi tribe. Her father was a doctor in the Afghan army. In 1979, the Soviet Union invaded Afghanistan and Azizi and her family fled to refugee camps in Pakistan. For some time, she attended a makeshift school, but conservative religious leaders (the Mujahideen) in the camp declared education to be non-Islamic. Both her father and mother protested, quoting from the Quran that there was no prohibition against women's education, but they did not make headway against the religious conservatives. Her mother died in the camp and one of her brothers was killed after he was recruited to fight against the Soviet army.

After she was unable to complete her education, she married and briefly went back to Kabul. However, she and her young family had trouble finding food and water, so they returned to Peshawar.

Between 1996 and 2000, Azizi supervised the women's program in Afghanistan for Norwegian Church Aid (NCA). Still living in Pakistan, she would travel from her home base to Afghanistan in order to "support women in rural areas, helping women with health, income-generating, and education programs." The Taliban set up roadblocks to stop people from bringing in supplies. So that she could safely enter the country, she would disguise herself as a women's doctor, wearing a burqa with only openings for her eyes.

In 1999, Azizi traveled to Virginia to attend a three-month training program at Eastern Mennonite University. When she returned, she was threatened by the Taliban for her "activism on behalf of women and for editing children's magazines advocating peace." Azizi applied for political asylum in the United States. When she came to the US, she testified at a Senate hearing in 2001. She became part of the Vital Voices Global Partnership. She stated that going back to the US made a big difference because she saw that other countries and groups wanted to help make a difference in her home country. She "engaged in a non-stop media blitz," talking to CNN, syndicated radio shows, at conferences and universities about the situation Afghan women and girls were facing.

With Vital Voices, she worked in cooperation with the United States Department of Labor and other private corporations to collect and distribute materials for Afghan women students in 2002.

In 2003, she went back to Afghanistan. Her husband took away her and her sons' American Passports and she was stuck in Kabul. She wanted to leave with her young sons, and came up with a plan to escape. She and her sons made it to the home of a former co-worker. While there, she became very ill and thought she wouldn't make it, but she recovered. Hillary Clinton, then a senator, was in Kabul at the time and she tried to help Azizi escape, but in the end, Azizi was forced to sneak out of the country. She made it back to Virginia with her sons and continues to work as a program officer for Vital Voices. In 2013, she was able to travel to Herat and work with women in the Kushk Rabat-e-Sangl district, located in western Afghanistan.

Azizi is the subject of a play, Seven, and her part was written by Ruth Margraff and played by actress Annet Mahendru.
