= Bridge and Tunnel (film) =

- Film poster
- Directed by: Jason Michael Brescia
- Written by: Jason Michael Brescia
- Produced by: Hamza Ahmad; Bob Burton; Ben Levitt; Sean Murray; Douglas Torres; Adam Lawrence
- Starring: Ryan Metcalf; Mary Kate Wiles; Arjun Gupta; Annet Mahendru; Joe Murphy; Chris Viemeister
- Cinematography: Trevor Wineman
- Edited by: Alex Oppenheimer
- Music by: Ryan Hunter
- Distributed by: Gravitas Ventures; Glacier Road Productions
- Release date: May 30, 2014
- Running time: 93 minutes
- Country: United States
- Language: English

Bridge and Tunnel is a 2014 American comedy-drama film written and directed by Jason Michael Brescia and released by Glacier Road Productions. The film stars Ryan Metcalf, Mary Kate Wiles and Annet Mahendru and tells the story of a group of twentysomething millennials coming of age in Long Island, New York. The film highlights the psychological impact of the September 11 attacks on the generation that grew up in the early part of the twenty-first century, the effects of the great recession on America's youth, and the destruction caused by Hurricane Sandy.

== Plot ==
The film begins on New Year's Day as six Long Island natives: Sal, his wife Meghan, Terry, Nate, Eric, and his girlfriend Lina discuss the pro's and con's of going into Manhattan on New Year's Eve. The group spent the holiday in Nassau County going to bars, and Terry makes the decision to drive home while intoxicated, resulting in a DWI arrest.

The first part of the film takes place from New Year's Day 2012 to the beginning of Spring and the main tension revolves around the characters struggling to cope with the transition to adulthood. Terry still lives at home with his mother and now has no vehicle due to his DWI. Sal and Meghan are debating whether or not they want to start a family, Nate is unemployed, and Eric and Lina's relationship is tested as Eric struggles to pay off his student loans while Lina desperately wants to leave the "change at Jamaica crowd" for the glitz and glamor of New York City.

The film then transitions into the spring and summer where the characters attempt to situate their love lives. Sal and Meghan decide that they're going to try to have a child, but are struggling to conceive. Nate tries to solve his relationship woes through online dating, while Eric finds a new love in Christine, a hair salon owner. Meanwhile, Terry begins courting Kelly, a classmate of his from a drunk drivers education course, while Lina moves into the Manhattan and begins working at an art gallery.

As the Summer transitions to Autumn, the male characters develop problems of their own amongst one another in the wake of the loss of a loved one. These differences are tested when Hurricane Sandy destroys Sal and Meghan's Long Beach apartment and brings everyone into the same room for the film's climax.

A year passes from the film's opening scene when on December 31, 2012, Terry, Lina, Nate, Eric, Sal, and Meghan make plans to go into Manhattan to visit Kelly at her new apartment for a New Year's party.

== Cast ==
- Ryan Metcalf as Sal Lodato
- Arjun Gupta as Terry
- Joe Murphy as Nate McLaughlin
- Chris Viemeister as Eric Richter
- Mary Kate Wiles as Christine Goodrich
- Annet Mahendru as Kelly Jones
- Brianne Berkson as Meghan Lodato
- Natalie Knepp as Lina
- Wass Stevens as Sean McLaughin
- Virgil as Kony
- Tombstone Stinton as Narrator
- Kenneth Kimmins as Dr. Pullman
- Liz Larsen as Mrs. Richter
- Kurt Metzger as Arn

== Production ==
The first shooting date of the film was December 1, 2012, thirty-two days after Hurricane Sandy ravaged the shores of Long Island. Initially the storm was not part of the script, but Brescia incorporated it into the film days after the events, understanding that the event was a major part of life on Long Island in 2012.

The film was shot throughout Long Island in both Nassau and Suffolk County. Some of the movie was filmed at the Rockville Centre Long Island Rail Road station.

The production was shot in increments to give the feeling of seasons changing. The second shooting installment was in the spring of 2013, followed by a shoot in June. On August 19, 2013 the principal photography of the film wrapped in Long Beach, New York on the new boardwalk while it was being built in place of the one that was destroyed in Sandy.

== Release ==
"Bridge and Tunnel" was scheduled to make its World Premiere in April 2014 at the Lewiston-Auburn Film Festival in Auburn, Maine but those plans deteriorated when the festival was cancelled after the arrest of its founder, Joshua Shea.

Beginning in May 2014, "Bridge and Tunnel" appeared in several regional film festivals including; Catskill Mountains Film Festival, New York City International Film Festival, Sanford International Film Festival, Laugh or Die Comedy Film Festival, The Other Venice Film Festival, Hoboken International Film Festival, Long Island International Film Expo, Emerge Film Festival, Long Beach International Film Festival, Temecula Valley International Film Festival, Paterson Falls Film Festival, Northeast Film Festival, Central Florida Film Festival, Minneapolis Underground Film Festival, Maryland International Film Festival, Williamsburg International Film Festival, and Harrisburg-Hershey Film Festival. The film would win several awards during its film festival tour.

On September 26, 2014 "Bridge and Tunnel" opened its theatrical run in Beverly Hills, California at the Laemmle Theatres Music Hall.

On September 11, 2015, the film opened for its second theatrical run in Harrisburg, Pennsylvania at Midtown Cinema after a special September 11 screening of the film as part of the Harrisburg-Hershey Film Festival, which was founded by "Bridge and Tunnel" producer Hamza Ahmad in order to bring independent film to the capital city of his home state of Pennsylvania.

The film was released across video on demand platforms such as iTunes, Amazon Video, Verizon, Cox, Google Play, and AT&T U-verse on February 2, 2016.

== Accolades ==
Festival	Award	Recipient	Result
Central Florida Film Festival (Orlando, Florida)	Best Feature Film		Nominated
Hoboken International Film Festival	Best Cinematography	Trevor Wineman	Nominated
Laugh or Die Comedy Festival (Chicago, Illinois)	Best Supporting Actress	Annet Mahendru	Nominated
Long Beach International Film Festival (Long Beach, New York)	Best Picture		Nominated
Long Beach International Film Festival (Long Beach, New York)	Best Supporting Actress	Annet Mahendru	Nominated
Long Beach International Film Festival (Long Beach, New York)	Best Made in New York Film		Won
Long Beach International Film Festival (Long Beach, New York)	Best Original Song	"Here Comes the Wolf" by John Nolan	Nominated
Long Beach International Film Festival (Long Beach, New York)	Best Director	Jason Michael Brescia	Nominated
Long Island International Film Expo	Jury Award for Best Picture		Nominated
Long Island International Film Expo	Jury Award for Best Director	Jason Michael Brescia	Nominated
Long Island International Film Expo	Jury Award for Best Long Island Produced Film		Won
Long Island International Film Expo	Technical Award for Best Original Song	"Here Comes the Wolf" by John Nolan	Won
Maverick Movie Awards	Best Picture		Won
Maverick Movie Awards	Best Director	Jason Michael Brescia	Nominated
Maverick Movie Awards	Best Original Screenplay	Jason Michael Brescia	Nominated
Maverick Movie Awards	Best Animation	Joe Dietsch	Nominated
Maverick Movie Awards	Best Actor	Ryan Metcalf	Nominated
Maverick Movie Awards	Best Actress	Natalie Knepp	Nominated
Maverick Movie Awards	Best Supporting Actor	Arjun Gupta	Won
Maverick Movie Awards	Best Supporting Actor	Chris Viemeister	Nominated
Maverick Movie Awards	Best Supporting Actress	Brianne Berkson	Won
Maverick Movie Awards	Best Performance	Entire Cast	Won
Maverick Movie Awards	Best Editing	Alex Oppenheimer	Nominated
Maverick Movie Awards	Best Original Score	Ryan Hunter	Nominated
Northeast Film Festival (New Jersey)	Best Picture		Nominated
Northeast Film Festival (New Jersey)	Best Director	Jason Michael Brescia	Nominated
Northeast Film Festival (New Jersey)	Best Actor	Ryan Metcalf	Nominated
Northeast Film Festival (New Jersey)	Best Supporting Actress	Annet Mahendru	Nominated
Northeast Film Festival (New Jersey)	Best Ensemble Cast		Won
The Other Venice Film Festival (Venice Beach, California)	Best Original Score	Ryan Hunter	Nominated
The Other Venice Film Festival (Venice Beach, California)	Best Original Song	"Here Comes the Wolf" by John Nolan	Won
Williamsburg International Film Festival (Williamsburg, Brooklyn)	Best Actor	Ryan Metcalf	Won
Williamsburg International Film Festival (Williamsburg, Brooklyn)	Best Screenplay	Jason Michael Brescia	Won

== Soundtrack ==
The movie includes original music by John Nolan of Taking Back Sunday, Vinnie Caruana of I Am the Avalanche, Happy Body Slow Brain, Bayside, and NGHBRS.

In July 2014, John Nolan's original song for the movie entitled "Here Comes the Wolf" was awarded with the "Best Original Song" honor at the Long Island International Film Expo. The song was also nominated for the same award at the Long Beach International Film Festival and The Other Venice Film Festival in Venice, California.

On October 21, 2014 the soundtrack was digitally released through Spotify, iTunes, Google Play, and other online digital retailers. The digital release of the album does not include "Indiana" by Bayside or "Hold Up Girl" by NGHBRS, because those two songs had previously been released by the artists themselves.

After a soundtrack release show at Webster Hall headlined by John Nolan and Vinnie Caruana, the soundtrack was released by Enjoy the Ride Records on December 30, 2014 with the following track listing:

No.	Title	Artist	Length
1.	"My House is an Empty White Box Too"	Ryan Hunter	3:01
2.	"Here Comes the Wolf"	John Nolan	4:45
3.	"Indiana"	Bayside	2:57
4.	"Hold Up Girl"	NGHBRS	3:15
5.	"The Old Barman's Song"	Giants at Large	3:39
6.	"Captain Kidd's Theme"	theMOUTH	1:33
7.	"It's Been Way too Long"	Vinnie Caruana	3:49
8.	"Wild Hogs"	Dan Pursino	1:43
9.	"Residue"	Happy Body Slow Brain	4:37
10.	"Round and Round"	Gabriel the Marine feat. John Nolan	3:42
11.	"Subways"	Ryan Hunter	2:42

=== Score ===
The original score for Bridge and Tunnel was composed by Ryan Hunter, the former lead singer of Envy on the Coast. Hunter's score was engineered by his former bandmate Brian Byrne, and also features guest appearances by Isaac Bolivar and Dylan Ebrahimian. In creating the score Hunter stated, "I started watching the film a lot, picking out scenes that I wanted to make music to. I also decided upon making music for those scenes that the music might not even end up there ... I knew before going into it, it needed an organic and imperfect approach to it. I called Brian Byrne to help me produce it and to engineer it, his studio has a lot of cool old toys and half broken instruments to work with and that's kind of what this called for."

The score was released digitally on September 16, 2014 with the following track listing:

No.	Title	Length
1.	"Springs, LI"	4:52
2.	"Was It Worth It?"	1:27
3.	"When the Beach Met the Bay"	3:09
4.	"Resolutions"	1:13
5.	"Springs, LI pt 2"	2:07
6.	"A Stoner's Tribute to Scott Joplin"	1:39
7.	"Subways"	2:59
Total length:		16:04
