= Bad Vegan and the Teleportation Machine =

- Theatrical release poster
- Directed by: Antón Goenechea
- Produced by: Brianne Berkson
- Starring: Andy Bean; Brianne Berkson; Adam Mucci; Adam Scarimbolo; Jackie Stewart; Tamara Tunie
- Cinematography: Markus E. Mueller
- Edited by: Ismael Gomez III
- Music by: John M. Davis
- Distributed by: Everlasting Films; Steadfast Productions
- Release date: October 2016 (Woodstock Film Festival)
- Running time: 90 minutes
- Country: United States
- Language: English

Bad Vegan and the Teleportation Machine is a 2016 American romantic comedy thriller independent film directed and written by Antón Goenechea. It stars Brianne Berkson, Andy Bean, Adam Mucci, Adam Scarimbolo, and Frank Pando. It was produced by Berkson and was distributed by Everlasting Films. The film was screened in February and released in October 2016 at the Woodstock Film Festival.

== Cast ==
- Andy Bean as Spike
- Brianne Berkson as Lily
- Adam Mucci as Paul
- Adam Scarimbolo as Harrison
- Frank Pando as Luther
- Jay Seals as Tom
- Kara Jackson as Marcia
- Tamara Tunie as Josephine Bodder
- Steve Hytner as Roger Bodder
- Rosalyn Coleman as Dr. Leffie

== Production ==
Filming took place in New York City, with a set partially built on location.
