= Inez McCormack =

Trade union leader and activist

- Born: Inez Murphy; 28 September 1943; Belfast, Northern Ireland
- Died: 21 January 2013 (aged 69); Derry, Northern Ireland
- Known for: Trade union leader and human rights campaigner; first female president of the Irish Congress of Trade Unions (1999–2001)
- Spouse: Vincent (1969 – 2013; her death)
- Children: 1

Inez McCormack (née Murphy; 28 September 1943 – 21 January 2013) was a Northern Irish trade union leader and human rights activist. She was the first female president of the Irish Congress of Trade Unions (1999 to 2001), representing the UNISON union. She also successfully campaigned for the inclusion of strong equality and human rights provisions in the Good Friday Agreement, and was a signatory to the MacBride Principles for fair employment. In 2002 she was described as "probably the best known and most experienced human rights campaigner in this country."

McCormack founded Participation and the Practice of Rights, a human rights organisation supporting disadvantaged groups based in Belfast, Northern Ireland, which she continued to advise until her death. Throughout her career, she crossed sectarian lines and national boundaries to fight for those who have faced, in her words, "the humiliation of exclusion," particularly women.

McCormack was named by the American publication Newsweek in 2011 as one of "150 women who shake the world", and her life and work have been portrayed by Meryl Streep in the documentary play SEVEN.

== Early years ==
Born Inez Murphy into an Ulster Protestant family in Cultra, County Down, she attended Glenlola Collegiate School until taking up a position as a junior clerk in the Northern Ireland Civil Service at the age of 17, studying at night for her A-levels. Of her sheltered unionist background, McCormack recalled: "I was a puzzled young Prod – until I was 17 I hadn't knowingly met a Catholic. I was a young Protestant girl who didn't understand that there were grave issues of inequality, injustice and division in our society". A restless spirit, she was twice beaten up at protests, once at a Northern Ireland civil rights march and once at an anti-Vietnam war demonstration in London's Grosvenor Square.

McCormack attended Magee College in Derry between 1964 and 1966 at the time of the controversial decision to locate Northern Ireland's second university in Coleraine: her "first taste of street politics, and a lesson in the nature of exclusion and abuse of power". She then attended Trinity College, Dublin from 1966 to 1968, and met Vincent McCormack – a founding member of the Derry Labour Party and former Bogside resident – in London shortly after her graduation. The pair married within three months of meeting. Her parents opposed her marriage to Vincent: "Mixed marriages weren't exactly popular or acceptable and there was a lot of reaction," she recalled. "Over the years they came round, more or less, but they were never comfortable with it."

== Activism ==
McCormack returned to Northern Ireland in late 1968 to find a burgeoning civil rights movement in the Northern Ireland Civil Rights Association, describing the experience years later as "living through a historical defining moment". McCormack became active in the civil rights marches alongside her husband, and was at the People's Democracy march in 1969 that was famously attacked by Ulster loyalists, including off-duty police, in the Burntollet bridge incident.

McCormack began a Diploma in Social Studies in 1969, commencing employment as a social worker in the Ballymurphy office of West Belfast Social Services in 1972. When armed conflict broke out there in the late 1960s, McCormack became deeply aware of the effect of deprivation and inequality on women and their families. Wracked by the Troubles, Ballymurphy at the time was "extraordinarily poor" and McCormack carried out her duties amid gunfights and extreme deprivation. An attempt was made to close down the Ballymurphy office, and the social workers based there were instructed to transfer to a different area. Realising they were needed in Ballymurphy, they refused to leave and were advised to join a trade union to help withstand the pressure to transfer. McCormack made contact with the National Union of Public Employees and they were subsequently accepted into the union with McCormack acting as shop steward. The transfer was eventually squashed, and McCormack began working part-time for the union in 1974.

== Career ==
Just two years later, in 1976 McCormack became the first female full-time official of the National Union of Public Employees (now UNISON) and was given the unprecedented task of recruiting 1000 members within her first five months of employment. Identifying that part-time women workers in the public sector were typically dismissed as 'too difficult to organise' and thus not unionised, McCormack embarked on the challenge of signing them up to the union, stating, "My whole mode of mobilising them was to make them see that their needs were real, that they were somebody". Her efforts were markedly successful, increasing union membership from 800 to 15000 by the time UNISON was formed in 1993. In the 1980s, McCormack was a signatory of the McBride Principles, a set of international ethical investment. She continues to work for ethical globalization to ensure that no one is left behind. She went on to become the first female regional secretary of UNISON, continuing to represent the low-paid women working as cleaners, home helps and nursing auxiliaries. McCormack continued her career in the trade union movement as the first woman to chair the Northern Ireland committee of the Irish Congress of Trade Unions (ICTU) (1984–1985), and served as the first female ICTU president (1999–2001).

Her success in a highly male-dominated environment in combination with her determination to champion the voices of the disadvantaged did not come without challenges, particularly from her male counterparts, recalling "At one meeting I was booed off the platform and called scum," adding, "I was talking about child care and was told that it shouldn't be on a trade union agenda". To those "inclined to take a stand against inequality or the abuse of human rights", McCormack asserted that "the fallout for the individual can sometimes be brutal, but it is emphatically worth it".

McCormack founded and led a broad coalition of groups who successfully argued for strong, inclusive equality and human rights provisions to be included in the Good Friday Agreement. She was also a signatory to the MacBride Principles for fair employment, and succeeded in galvanising Irish-American opinion to combat the early unpopular reception to the Principles in Northern Ireland. The MacBride Principles were signed into US law in 1998, and harnessed the power of US investment against the practice of religious discrimination in employment in Northern Ireland.

Her pivotal role in the Good Friday Agreement led McCormack to subsequently campaign for the implementation of those equality and human rights provisions as key to an understanding of conflict resolution based on the practice of justice. Concerned that the majority of communities most affected by the Troubles continued to be amongst the most socially deprived areas of Northern Ireland, McCormack led campaigns to assert the rights of the most socially excluded and enable them to challenge the problems they experienced, stating, "Our job is to put the areas and people who are excluded at the centre of our economic and social planning and show that we can actually tackle the unjust and unstable conditions. I argue that a lot of the social problems come because the economy is built in a way that excludes people rather than includes".

In 2006 McCormack founded Participation and Practice of Rights (PPR), a human rights organisation based in Belfast. PPR supports marginalised groups in using a practical and unique human rights-based approach to tackle the social and economic challenges they experience. Successes include the establishment of a new appointment system for mental health patients attending emergency departments across Northern Ireland, re-housing families from run-down tower blocks, and renegotiation of regeneration plans from which residents have been excluded. Mary Robinson, former President of Ireland and UN High Commissioner for Human Rights, has described the work of the organisation as "groundbreaking," saying, "They are not just challenging what is wrong, they are creating an inclusive sense of rights and dignity, they are engaged in pioneering work which will command much interest and application elsewhere".

McCormack was a founding member of the Vital Voices Global Advisory Council, and honoured in 2002 at Vital Voices Global Leadership Awards in recognition of her contributions as a human rights advocate. The international organisation supports and invests in emerging women leaders in harnessing their potential to bring about peace and prosperity in their communities. McCormack was also appointed in 2010 by the Irish government as the independent chair of a consultative process to develop an Irish National Action Plan to meet government obligations under the UN Resolution on Women, Peace and Security.

McCormack received numerous awards, including an honorary doctorate from Queen's University Belfast in 2000 for her services to human rights and the community. She received the Eleanor Roosevelt Award from New York City in 1997, the Aisling Person of the Year Community Award in 2001, and the Irish Tatler Women of the Year Award in 2008. She received a posthumous LLD honorary doctorate from University of Ulster in 2013.

McCormack was a well-known writer and broadcaster, and her work has been featured in a number of television programmes and documentaries. Numerous op-eds and articles by McCormack on the theme of underpinning building peace and prosperity by inclusive socio-economic strategies have been published in recent years, and some of her work was included in the Field Day Anthology of Irish Writing (2002).

On 4 March 2019 Belfast's Crumlin Road was renamed Inez McCormack Road as part of International Women's Week celebrations.

== Recognition ==
McCormack's career was featured in the 2010 American documentary play Seven. The play, developed by Vital Voices, spotlights seven women from across the world that have overcame obstacles to bring major changes in their home countries. Meryl Streep portrayed McCormack. When the women portrayed were asked to come on stage and stand beside their onstage likenesses, Streep stated that she "felt slight" while standing beside McCormack, adding, "I'm an actress and she is the real deal."

In 2011, Newsweek named McCormack as one of its "150 women who shake the world," the only Northern Irish woman to be named as such.

The documentary, Inez McCormack: A Challenging Woman, produced and narrated by Susan McKay, won best short documentary award at the Galway Film Fleadh in 2014.

Among those who have paid tribute to her were the Irish president Michael D Higgins, the former president, Mary Robinson, and Hillary Clinton. Clinton said: "She travelled the world encouraging young women to be agents of change in their communities and countries. We have come so far in part because of her insistence on a seat at the table for women and others who have been marginalised."

== Personal life and death ==
McCormack had lived in Derry since 2001. On 21 January 2013 she died from cancer at the age of 69 in Foyle hospice. Shortly before her death, when asked why she did the work that she did, McCormack replied that: "...at the heart of everything, I desire to see the glint in a woman’s eye who thought she was nobody, when she realised she was somebody."

Trade union offices
Preceded by Edmund Browne	President of the Irish Congress of Trade Unions; 1999–2001	Succeeded by Joe O'Toole
