= Joseph Booton (actor) =

British actor and puppeteer

- Born: 2 July 1987 (age 39); Harold Wood, London, England
- Occupation: Actor
- Years active: 2010–present

Joseph Booton (born 2 July 1987) is a British actor and puppeteer. He is a performer of the traditional British puppet show, Punch and Judy. His first two lead roles in a feature film are The Newest Pledge and MILF. He attended Royal Holloway, University of London alongside fellow actor Tom Weston-Jones.

== Early life ==
Booton was born at Harold Wood Hospital in the London Borough of Havering. Whilst at primary school, his teacher advised his mother that her son had a natural talent for acting. Being a quiet and reflective child at home, his mother replied that they must be mistaking her son for another child.

Booton appeared in many secondary school and sixth form college productions, including playing the role of Mr. Toad in Alan Bennett's stage adaptation of Kenneth Graeme's The Wind in the Willows. For this production Booton wore the same costume worn by actor Griff Rhys Jones in the National Theatre's 1990 production of the same name. During his time at school, Booton and a classmate wrote, directed and starred in their own two-man comedy show, which was performed for an audience of 400 and raised over £1,500 for a local charity.

After leaving sixth form college Booton went on to study Drama & Theatre Studies at Royal Holloway, University of London where he was a part of the numerous productions that took place there, including playing Cheswick in Dale Wasserman's stage adaptation of Ken Kasey's One Flew Over The Cuckoo's Nest and Mosca in Ben Jonson's Volpone; an open-air production in the 19th Century Founder's Building.

In 2009 Booton moved to Los Angeles to complete a diploma course in Acting for Film. In addition Booton spent some time developing his improvisation skills with ACME Comedy Theatre, making an appearance in their weekly Theatre Sports shows.

== Career ==
After completing his diploma course in Los Angeles, Booton was granted a work permit for one year and continued to live in the United States. Initially he began doing Extra work on several major television shows and was cast in a small role in the American Film Institute short film Thule, which went on to win an award at the 2009 GI Film Festival. His first major appearance then came in the form of a guest star role on an episode of the Discovery Channel's TV series Worst-Case Scenario.

Booton then went on to appear in his first feature film role as the lead antagonist in the comedy feature film The Newest Pledge released by Lions Gate Entertainment and directed by Jason Michael Brescia. Booton originally auditioned for one of the supporting characters that was then later cut by Brescia from the script. Instead Booton was offered the leading role of Rico Larsen and earned his first role in a feature film and his first leading role in a feature film at the same time. Booton then went on to appear in his second feature film lead role in the cult-comedy hit film MILF.

Upon his return to England, Booton made his commercial debut in an advertising promotion for The Guardian and The Observer national newspapers. He also filmed a lead role in a pilot episode for a new television comedy entitled Gradulthood, based on the struggle facing graduates seeking jobs in the post-recession market place. The pilot was mentioned in the London Evening Standard newspaper as part of a wider discussion on young people's struggle to secure employment following the global recession. In keeping with roles that have a social commentary, Booton took a part in UK feature film K-Shop, looking at society's problem with binge drinking and picking up national media coverage and a global film distribution deal.

== Punch and Judy ==
In 2013 Booton finished an apprenticeship in the art of the traditional English puppet show of Punch & Judy. Booton published an undergraduate thesis on the traditional puppetry art of Punch & Judy and through his research met and worked with one of the last remaining Punch & Judy street showman in England. After his apprenticeship, Booton continued to perform the traditional English art form of Punch & Judy internationally. As a performer of Punch & Judy, Booton is one of the last few remaining practitioners of this traditional art form and a member of one of the oldest organisations of its kind.

== Political Work ==
Booton stood in the 2019 United Kingdom general election as a Green Party candidate, finishing in fourth place of six candidates in East Surrey, with 3.9% of the vote. Booton also stood in the 2021 United Kingdom local elections in Reigate and Banstead and was elected as a Green Party Councillor for the Earlswood and Whitebushes ward of the Borough Council.

== Filmography ==
Year	Title	Role	Episode
2019	Blood on the Road	Jack	Short
2017	The New Death	Dave	Short
2016	K-Shop	CCTV Chief	Film
2014	Blood on the Road	Jack	Short
2014	What If Life Was Like The Movies	Michael	Short
2013	Gradulthood	Ralph	TV Pilot
2012	The Newest Pledge	Rico	Film
2011	Thule	Airman Walker	Short
2011	Comic Relief : The Million Pound Drop	Comedic Contestant	TV movie
2010	Worst-Case Scenario	Party Vampire	TV – 1 Episode
2010	Star Washers	Elan	Short
2010	MILF	Nate	Film
2010	No Ordinary Family	Wolverine Mascot	TV – 2 episodes
2010	1000 Ways to Die	Chess Geek / Bell Boy	TV – 2 episodes
2010	Hitachi's Tempura	Sapporo (Voice)	Short
