= Dodge College of Film and Media Arts =

College in Orange, California, U.S.

Lawrence and Kristina Dodge College of Film and Media Arts
- Established: 1996
- Dean: Stephen Galloway
- Faculty: 44 full-time, 86 adjunct
- Students: 1500 (approx.)
- Undergraduates: 250 (per year)
- Postgraduates: 150 (per year)
- Location: Orange, California
- Website: chapman.edu/dodge

Dodge College of Film and Media Arts is one of 10 schools constituting Chapman University, located in Orange, California, 40 miles (64 km) south of Los Angeles. The school offers undergraduate and graduate degrees, with programs in film production, screenwriting, creative producing, news, documentary, public relations, advertising, digital arts, film studies, television writing, producing, and screen acting.

Dodge College has approximately 1,465 students: 1,209 in the undergraduate program and 256 in the graduate program.

The school has regularly ranked in the top 10 of The Hollywood Reporter's annual Best U.S. Film School rankings, and as of 2026, is ranked #4.

== History ==
The School of Film and Television was created in 1996 with Robert Bassett as the founding dean. The school occupied a building on main campus named for filmmaker Cecil B. DeMille, in honor of support by CeCe Presley, DeMille's grand daughter. Bassett subsequently led a campaign that ultimately raised $52 million to build and equip a new building. A gift of $20 million from Lawrence and Kristina Dodge led to the naming of Lawrence and Kristina Dodge College of Film and Media Arts, housed in Marion Knott Studios, named for philanthropist Marion Knott, who made a major gift to the project.

Robert Bassett resigned as dean in 2019. Following his resignation, associate dean and professor Michael Kowalski served as the interim dean. In January 2020, Dodge College announced its hiring of Stephen Galloway, executive editor of The Hollywood Reporter, as the new dean, effective March 30, 2020.

In 2019, President Daniele C. Struppa refused to take down two The Birth of a Nation posters that hung in the school. Struppa outlined his reasons in an opinion piece called, "Why I won't take down the original 'The Birth of a Nation' poster." Black students at Chapman voiced opposition to Struppa's decision, and peaceful protests were organized on campus. Faculty members took a survey on their stance to remove the posters, and the posters were eventually taken down.

== Facilities ==
The school is housed within three buildings in Orange, California:

- Marion Knott Studios , a 76,000 sq ft (7,100 m^{2}) building designed to replicate a working production studio. Open 24/7 to students, it includes two sound stages, audition rooms, and the 500-seat Folino theater.
- The Digital Media Arts Center, an 18,000 sq ft (1,700 m^{2}) building for the Digital Arts - Animation and Visual Effects programs, opened for classes in the fall of 2014. The Digital Media Arts Center is a working, industry-standard studio that rivals those of Pixar, Disney, Microsoft, and Google. It combines “hang-out spaces” that include a coffee bar, indoor lounge and large patio with picnic tables, with flexible classrooms and laboratories that provide Dodge College students with access to technology including:
- Chapman Studios West is a 38,000-square-foot building that supports Dodge College's documentary filmmaking program in the Dhont Documentary Center. It includes a prop warehouse, cinematography stage, and screening room.

== Programs ==
=== Undergraduate degrees ===
Bachelor of Arts

- Film and Media Studies, B.A.
- Public Relations, Advertising, and Entertainment Marketing, B.A.

Bachelor of Fine Arts

- Animation and Visual Effects, B.F.A.
- Broadcast Journalism and Documentary, B.F.A.
- Creative Producing, B.F.A.
- Film and Television Production, B.F.A.
- Screen Acting, B.F.A.
- Writing for Film and Television, B.F.A.

Integrated programs

- Integrated Bachelor’s degree/Master of Arts in Film and Media Studies

=== Graduate degrees ===
- M.A. Film Studies
- M.F.A. Film Production
- M.F.A. Film and Television Producing
- M.F.A. Production Design
- M.F.A. Screenwriting
- M.B.A./M.F.A. Film and TV Producing
- M.F.A. Documentary Filmmaking
- The Showrunner Program (MFA)

=== Joint degrees ===
- J.D./M.F.A. Film and TV Producing (with Chapman University School of Law)
- M.B.A./M.F.A Film and TV Producing (with Argyros School of Business and Economics)

Minors offered in Dodge College include film studies, broadcast journalism, television, advertising, public relations, visual effects, production design for film, and documentary film.

The Summer Film Academy offers two-week courses to students entering their junior or senior year in high school.

== Conferences and festivals ==
Women in Focus is an annual conference celebrating the women who have been successful in the often male dominated film business. The college invites women who work in film as panelists, to show clips of their work and discuss the challenges facing women in the industry. Past panels have included female directors, producers, production designers, editors, cinematographers, and studio executives and more:

The Sikh Film Festival is an annual three-day festival at the college showcasing a diverse assortment of Sikh-centric films, books, art performance pieces and music.

Select student films are screened for industry representatives at the Directors Guild of America (DGA) in Los Angeles each fall and in New York each spring.

The college has hosted the University Film and Video Association (UFVA) Conference three times, in 1996, 2006, and 2013.

The college hosted the Centre International de Liaison des Ecoles de Cinéma et de Télévision (CILECT) Conference in 2014.

== International connections ==
- A scholarship program enables students to travel to various countries to create documentaries about NGOs.
- Students participate in an exchange program with the Seoul Institute of the Arts and Dongseo University in Korea, the Graduate Institute of Filmmaking of Taipei National University of the Arts in Taiwan, and Ngee Ann Polytechnic in Singapore
- Chapman is one of 14 U.S. colleges and universities elected to membership in the Centre International de Liaison des Ecoles de Cinéma et de Télévision (CILECT).
- Chapman previously offered a B.F.A. degree in Creative Producing in Singapore, in partnership with the School of Film and Media Studies at Ngee Ann Polytechnic, however, that partnership has since ended.

== Notable alumni ==
- Jason Michael Brescia, writer/director (The Newest Pledge)
- Matt Duffer and Ross Duffer, creators (Stranger Things)
- Hannah Einbinder, actor (Hacks)
- Parker Finn, director (Smile)
- Arden Jones, rapper
- Ben York Jones, writer (Like Crazy)
- Harshvardhan Kapoor, actor (Mirzya, Bhavesh Joshi)
- Payton Koch, film editor (Only Murders in the Building, Avatar: The Last Airbender)
- Carlos López Estrada, director (Blindspotting)
- Stephen Nelson, sportcaster (Los Angeles Dodgers)
- Olatunde Osunsanmi, director (The Fourth Kind)
- Chris Marrs Piliero, winner of a VMA Music Award
- Justin Simien, creator (Dear White People)
- Roger Craig Smith, voice actor
- James Sweeney, director/actor (Twinless)
- Josie Totah, actor/writer/producer (The Buccaneers)
- Gala del Sol, writer/director
- Michael Vlamis, actor (The Odyssey)
