= Brianne Berkson =

American actress, comedian and producer

- Born: Brianne Berkson; Manhattan, New York, U.S.
- Education: Columbia University
- Occupations: Actress, comedian, producer
- Years active: 2003–present
- Website: www.briguel.com

Brianne Berkson is an American actress, comedian and producer known for films Bridge and Tunnel (2014), Bad Vegan and the Teleportation Machine (2016), Dare (2009), and Exposed (2016).

== Early life and education ==
Brianne Berkson was born in New York to Simon Bergson, the son of Auschwitz survivors, and Stefany Dobken Bergson. After high school, she went on to attend Columbia University, where she graduated and received a B.A. in English & Comparative Literature.

== Career ==
As an actress, Berkson has appeared in various films, live theater and TV. She made her acting debut in the film Happy End.

In 2009, she appeared in the film Dare.

In 2011, she started her own production company, Everlasting Films.

In 2014, she appeared in a comedy Bridge and Tunnel and won a best supporting actress award at the Maverick Movie Awards.

In 2016, she appeared in the film Exposed.

In 2017, Berkson produced and co-wrote "Fly Away", a short film part of the Cannes Film Festival.

According to a May 2018 news interview with WPIX Channel 11, she is filming a comedy hip-hop Series named “BriGuel’.

In August 2018, Berkson (as BriGuel) released "LOVE" a song and music video featuring Klept of The Notorious B.I.G.'s Junior Mafia

=== TV ===
Berkson has appeared on a few television series, including Rescue Me, (Season 2009) and a TV movie called Oh Be Joyful (2006).

=== Production Work ===
In 2011, Berkson started her own production company named Everlasting Films. She produced, cowrote, and starred in the film Bad Vegan and the Teleportation Machine, released in 2016 at the Woodstock Film Festival.

=== Comedy ===
In 2009, Berkson produced, wrote, and starred a one-woman show called "A Longhardt Look at Love with Chad Longhardt." She played 11 characters.

In 2010, the show played at Comix NY which restarted Berkson stand-up comedy career.

Berkson voiced a character in Grand Theft Auto IV game.

In 2012, Berkson was involved the viral comedy prank "Mrs. Irrelevant".

In 2014, Berkson was involved in the comedy project GlobalAmbassador.nyc website, spoofing Taylor Swift's “Welcome to New York” site.

=== BriGuel ===
BriGuel is an artist duo consisting of Brianne Berkson and Miguel Glückstern.

In 2020, BriGuel premiered “The Difference”, “No One Really Knows”, and their debut EP "2020 Vision". The EP was entirely produced by Matt Chiaravalle and features Andres Gonzalez.

The EP was inspired by a documentary movie "The Difference" that was also produced by BriGuel, Andres Gonzalez and the Baltimore based, Holistic Life Foundation. “The Difference” movie was featured at the Tribeca Film Festival.

== Personal life ==
Berkson currently lives in Brooklyn with her fiancée and creative partner Miguel Glückstern.
