= 2021 Reigate and Banstead Borough Council election =

Local election in Surrey, England

Results of the 2021 Reigate and Banstead Borough Council election

The 2021 Reigate and Banstead Borough Council election took place on 6 May 2021 to elect members to Reigate and Banstead Borough Council in England coinciding with other local elections.

== Results summary ==
2021 Reigate and Banstead Borough Council election
Party	This election			Full council			This election		
Party	Seats	Net	Seats %	Other	Total	Total %	Votes	Votes %	+/−
Conservative	11	▼1	61.1	17	28	63.6	21,159	47.1	+5.2
Green	4	▲1	22.2	3	7	15.9	9,412	20.9	+5.3
Liberal Democrats	1	Steady	5.6	2	3	6.8	4,012	8.9	-5.0
Nork RA	1	Steady	5.6	2	3	6.8	1,909	4.2	-1.4
Tattenham RA	1	Steady	5.6	2	3	6.8	1,226	2.7	-1.8
Labour	0	Steady	0.0	0	0	0.0	7,158	15.9	+2.9
UKIP	0	Steady	0.0	0	0	0.0	53	0.1	-4.2

== Ward results ==
=== Banstead Village ===
Banstead Village
Party	Candidate	Votes	%	±%
Conservative	Nadean Moses	1,731	68.5	+15.9
Green	Sophie Rowlands	309	12.2	−20.7
Labour	Jeremy Golding	254	10.0	−8.3
Liberal Democrats	Mark Johnston	234	9.3	N/A
Majority		1,422	56.3	
Turnout		2,528	38.0	
Conservative hold		Swing		

=== Chipstead, Kingswood and Woodansterne ===
Chipstead, Kingswood and Woodansterne
Party	Candidate	Votes	%	±%
Conservative	Caroline Neame	2,094	72.2	+19.9
Green	Jennifer Pope	448	15.4	−12.4
Labour	Cathy Davis	360	12.4	−3.1
Majority		1,646	56.8	
Turnout		2,902	39.0	
Conservative hold		Swing		

=== Earlswood and Whitebushes ===
Earlswood and Whitebushes (2 seats due to by-election)
Party	Candidate	Votes	%	±%
Green	Joseph Booton	1,331	58.6	+0.4
Green	Della Torra	1,106	48.7	+3.9
Conservative	Barbara Thomson	799	35.2	+12.2
Conservative	Chris Reynolds	686	30.2	+7.2
Labour	Rex Giles	347	15.3	+5.1
Labour	Mark Scott	271	11.9	+0.2
Turnout		——	38.0	
Green hold				
Green hold				

=== Hooley, Merstham and Netherne ===
Hooley, Merstham and Netherne (2 seats due to by-election)
Party	Candidate	Votes	%	±%
Conservative	Frank Kelly	1,423	59.8	+29.5
Conservative	Mus Tary	1,003	42.2	+9.6
Labour	Shaka Aklilu	745	31.3	+3.4
Green	Soo Abram	554	23.3	−1.3
Labour	Ian Thirlwall	521	21.9	−3.2
Liberal Democrats	Jemma de Vincenzo	510	21.4	+3.1
Turnout		—	35.0	
Conservative hold				
Conservative hold				

=== Horley Central and South ===
Horley Central and South
Party	Candidate	Votes	%	±%
Conservative	Christian Stevens	1,381	57.6	+19.0
Labour	Tom Turner	631	26.3	+0.2
Green	William Watson	386	16.1	−13.1
Majority		750	31.3	
Turnout		2,398	33.0	
Conservative hold		Swing		

=== Horley East and Salfords ===
Horley East and Salfords (2 seats due to by-election)
Party	Candidate	Votes	%	±%
Conservative	Andrew King	1,194	58.8	+16.4
Conservative	James Baker	1,118	55.1	+14.2
Green	Shasha Khan	854	42.1	+4.0
Labour	Lynnette Easterbrook	529	26.1	+0.1
Labour	Tom Latter	364	17.9	−5.4
Turnout		—	36.0	
Conservative hold				
Conservative hold				

=== Horley West and Sidlow ===
Horley West and Sidlow
Party	Candidate	Votes	%	±%
Conservative	Giorgio Buttironi	1,331	58.8	+22.3
Labour Co-op	Cecilia Hughes	612	27.1	+0.3
Liberal Democrats	Geoff Southall	319	14.1	−18.8
Majority		719	31.7	
Turnout		2,262	30.0	
Conservative hold		Swing		

=== Lower Kingswood, Tadworth and Walton ===
Lower Kingswood, Tadworth and Walton
Party	Candidate	Votes	%	±%
Conservative	Zelanie Cooper	2,018	67.8	+7.6
Liberal Democrats	Christopher Thompson	379	12.7	−11.0
Green	Jake Peet	306	10.3	N/A
Labour	David Burnley	272	9.1	−3.9
Majority		1,639	55.1	
Turnout		2,975	38.0	
Conservative hold		Swing		

=== Meadvale and St. John's ===
Meadvale and St. John's
Party	Candidate	Votes	%	±%
Liberal Democrats	Martin Elbourne	1,226	43.0	+5.4
Conservative	Jonathan White	1,102	38.6	+4.5
Labour	Mark Smith	472	16.5	+7.5
UKIP	Alastair Richardson	53	1.9	N/A
Majority		124	4.4	
Turnout		2,853	42.0	
Liberal Democrats hold		Swing		

=== Nork ===
Nork
Party	Candidate	Votes	%	±%
Nork RA	Peter Harp	1,909	69.4	-1.2
Conservative	Jane Illingworth	586	21.3	+2.6
Labour	Calli Mistry	153	5.6	−0.8
Liberal Democrats	Claude Knights	103	3.7	−4.5
Majority		1,323	48.1	
Turnout		2,751	38.0	
Nork RA hold		Swing		

=== Redhill East ===
Redhill East
Party	Candidate	Votes	%	±%
Green	Sue Sinden	1,528	64.8	+11.1
Conservative	Shysta Manzoor	557	23.6	+2.4
Labour	Mick Hay	273	11.6	+2.9
Majority		971	41.2	
Turnout		2,358	39.0	
Green hold		Swing	▲0.2	

=== Redhill West and Wray Common ===
Redhill West and Wray Common
Party	Candidate	Votes	%	±%
Conservative	Kanika Sachdeva	1,143	42.6	+7.2
Green	Frank Percy	528	19.7	−3.3
Labour	Rosie Norgrove	516	19.2	+2.8
Liberal Democrats	Stuartt Holmes	498	18.5	+0.4
Majority		615	22.9	
Turnout		2,685	38.0	
Conservative hold		Swing		

=== Reigate ===
Reigate
Party	Candidate	Votes	%	±%
Conservative	Michael Blacker	1,580	49.2	+13.9
Liberal Democrats	John Vincent	673	21.0	−7.4
Green	Andrew Proudfoot	652	20.3	±0.0
Labour	Tony Robinson	304	9.5	+3.0
Majority		907	28.2	
Turnout		3,209	44.0	
Conservative hold		Swing		

=== South Park and Woodhatch ===
South Park and Woodhatch
Party	Candidate	Votes	%	±%
Green	Paul Chandler	1,317	52.3	+22.5
Conservative	Simon Rickman	912	36.2	+4.9
Labour	Linda Giles	289	11.5	−12.1
Majority		405	16.1	
Turnout		2,518	39.0	
Green gain from Conservative		Swing		

=== Tattenham Corner and Preston ===
Tattenham Corner and Preston
Party	Candidate	Votes	%	±%
Tattenham RA	Bob Harper	1,226	57.4	-13.3
Conservative	Aaron Harris	501	23.5	+10.3
Labour	Steve Boeje	245	11.5	+0.3
Green	Alistair Morten	93	4.4	−6.1
Liberal Democrats	Andrew Knights	70	3.3	N/A
Majority		725	33.9	
Turnout		2,135	30.0	
Tattenham RA hold		Swing		
