= The Fosters season 5 =

The Fosters
- Season 5
- The Fosters season 5 poster
- Starring: Teri Polo; Sherri Saum; Hayden Byerly; David Lambert; Maia Mitchell; Danny Nucci; Cierra Ramirez; Noah Centineo
- No. of episodes: 22

Release
- Original network: Freeform
- Original release: July 11, 2017 – June 6, 2018

Season chronology
- ← Previous; Season 4

The fifth and final season of The Fosters premiered on July 11, 2017. The season consisted of 22 episodes and stars Teri Polo and Sherri Saum as Stef Foster and Lena Adams, an interracial lesbian couple, who have adopted a girl (Maia Mitchell) and her younger brother (Hayden Byerly) while also trying to juggle raising Latino twin teenagers (Cierra Ramirez and Noah Centineo) and Stef's biological son (David Lambert). Danny Nucci also returns as Mike Foster in a recurring role.

== Synopsis ==
After 5 years of highs and lows, love, heart break, and secrets, the Adam-Foster family says goodbye in a final farewell season that welcomes new hopes, challenges and dangers.

Callie escapes from the pimp and finally listens to her parents. She applies for art school but gets caught up in progressive student politics and will see a new career path materialise in front of her. Her friendship with DACA sisters lead her in a crusade to fight for the rights of undocumented persons.

When developers want to take over the school Mariana and Jude rally the students to their cause. A power struggle over the control of Anchor Beach leads to the school being saved and Lena as the principal.

Stef succumbs to the pressure from work and from an old school friend that moved in next door. The emotion of dealing with 5 teenagers and her lesbian friends causes her to have panic attacks so she has therapy to cope with it all.

Brandon goes through misery and heartache when his new girlfriend Grace gets sick with leukaemia and eventually dies. Grace teaches Brandon valuable lessons on not wasting time and trying something new every day.

Jesus continues his rehab and finally returns to his studies. His on again, off again relationship with Emma has some highs and lows. He later helps out with the local roller derby girls team. His girlfriend Emma successfully tries out for the team.

Mariana has several boys interested in being her boyfriend, she must make a hard choice in the end. She takes roller derby and later has Jesus manage the team.

Jude decides to clean up his act by not consuming medicinal marijuana he was getting off his boyfriend, Noah. He starts a webcast with his friend Taylor and it leads to online gaming and royalties. His parents put a stop to it when what he thought was playful banter could be considered softcore.

=== 5 year time jump ===
The family returns to celebrate Brandon's wedding. Brandon met Eliza when he wanted some musicians for a piece he was conducting. Eliza's older brother Jamie is a corporate lawyer with charm but it doesn't thaw Callie's heart. She's been on a relationship freeze since she broke up with Aaron all those years ago. She has a job offer with a conservative judge but she is holding out for a more progressive judge offer.

== Cast ==
=== Main cast ===
- Teri Polo as Stef Adams Foster
- Sherri Saum as Lena Adams Foster
- Hayden Byerly as Jude Adams Foster
- Noah Centineo as Jesus Adams Foster
- David Lambert as Brandon Foster
- Maia Mitchell as Callie Adams Foster
- Danny Nucci as Mike Foster^{1}
- Cierra Ramirez as Mariana Adams Foster

^Note 1: Danny Nucci is only credited as a series regular for the episodes he appears in.

=== Recurring cast ===
- Elliot Fletcher as Aaron Baker
- Kalama Epstein as Noah
- Amanda Leighton as Emma
- Annika Marks as Monte Porter
- Izabela Vidovic as Taylor Shaw
- Lisseth Chavez as Ximena Sinfuego
- Nandy Martin as Poppy Sinfuego
- Meg DeLacy as Grace Mullen
- Nia Peeples as Susan Mullen
- Tom Williamson as AJ Hensdale
- Jordan Rodrigues as Mat Tan
- Alex Saxon as Wyatt
- Christopher Meyer as Logan Bayfield
- Kristen Ariza as Tess Bayfield
- Reggie Austin as Dean Bayfield
- Jared Ward as Drew Turner
- Denyse Tontz as Cortney Strathmore
- Brandon Quinn as Gabriel Duncroft
- Alexandra Barreto as Ana Gutierrez
- Alex Skuby as Joe Gray
- Tyler Alvarez as Declan Rivers
- Nick Fink as Shawn
- Abigail Cowen as Eliza Hunter
- Beau Mirchoff as Jamie Hunter
- Robert Gant as Jim Hunter
- Susan Walters as Diane Hunter
- Spencer List as Carter Hunter
- Dallas Young as Corey

=== Guest cast ===
- Annie Potts as Sharon Elkin
- Lorraine Toussaint as Dana Adams
- Bruce Davison as Stuart Adams
- Kerr Smith as Robert Quinn
- Marlene Forte as Elena Gutierrez
- Tony Plana as Victor Gutierrez
- Jamie McShane as Donald Jacob
- Adam Irigoyen as Kyle Snow
- Louis Hunter as Nick Stratos
- Suzanne Cryer as Jenna Paul
- Madisen Beaty as Talya Banks
- Daffany Clark as Daphne Keene
- Chad Todhunter as Patrick Molloy
- Hope Olaidé Wilson as Diamond
- Mark Totty as Craig Stratos
- Jay Ali as Timothy
- Tom Phelan as Cole

== Episodes ==
No. overall	No. in season	Title	Directed by	Written by	Original release date	US viewers (millions)
83	1	"Resist"	Peter Paige	Bradley Bredeweg & Peter Paige	July 11, 2017	0.87
Still thinking her sentence is inevitable, Callie is now stuck in a motel room with Diamond and her psychopath pimp, while Stef races against the clock to find her before it's too late. Struggling with his TBI, Jesus unleashes his anger and takes a baseball bat to Brandon's room. Gabe and Ana admit to being clueless about the dynamics of their relationships with Jesus and Mariana. With Mariana leading the charge, protests continue over Anchor Beach Charter's privatization. Jude gets pepper-sprayed.
84	2	"Exterminate Her"	Danny Nucci	Joanna Johnson	July 18, 2017	0.69
Stef reads Callie the riot act, but learns from Robert that the charges against her have been dropped. Callie starts a class at the local college where she meets Ximena. She gets annoyed when Robert speaks on her behalf. Grace tries to seduce Brandon but he was clueless as to her motives. Jesus distances himself from Mariana and Brandon so he can build his treehouse with Gabe alone. Stef gets a visit from a friend from her past who is also now her new neighbor. Tess knew Stef from high school.
85	3	"Contact"	Aprill Winney	Anne Meredith	July 25, 2017	0.76
Callie and Aaron go on their first official date. Mariana and Jude spearhead an underground school newspaper. Noah and Jude question their compatibility, while Brandon and Grace take their relationship to the next level. The family takes snapshots of Callie when she less expects it and she finds most pictures have her frowning. The school board finds Monte is still officially the principal. The moms have their new neighbors over for a family dinner party. Aaron learns Callie hates the unknown when dating. Jesus wants to return to school but doesn't have medical clearance.
86	4	"Too Fast, Too Furious"	Tate Donovan	Cristian Martinez	August 1, 2017	0.66
Callie and Aaron want to take their relationship to the next level. Callie asks Cole for relationship advice. Mariana forges Lena's signature to be able to train with the Latina roller derby team. Callie confronts AJ about why they broke up; she doesn't like his answer. Brandon's new girlfriend Grace catches him babysitting for his ex-girlfriend Cortney. Callie and Aaron both reveal their insecurities. Mike and Ana get engaged.
87	5	"Telling"	Anne Renton	Kris Q. Rehl	August 8, 2017	0.69
Mariana continues to train with the roller derby team. Jesus and Emma argue at school. The Fosters kids attend a party at the roller derby warehouse, but Jesus has a seizure. The party gets shut down when the cops show up. Stef works with Cole to help young runaways on the streets. Lena struggles when Stef starts to become obsessed with an ongoing case at work, meanwhile Brandon's relationship with Grace is put into jeopardy with Cortney back in his life. Ximena tells Callie she's undocumented.
88	6	"Welcome to the Jungler"	Kelli Williams	Megan Lynn & Wade Solomon	August 15, 2017	0.61
Callie visits Kyle now that he has been released. Callie is torn with supporting a cause that Aaron disagrees with. Jesus wants to leave school but his parents won't let him. Brandon has an awkward night with his ex- and new girlfriends. Jude and Taylor begin making gaming videos that earn them unwanted notoriety. Emma tells Jesus she wouldn't marry a man who hasn't graduated high school. Stef makes major headway in her case. Callie discovers this cause could get her in serious trouble.
89	7	"Chasing Waterfalls"	Chandra Wilson	Bradley Bredeweg & Peter Paige	August 22, 2017	0.58
Lena's parents are back in town for a visit. Some art students throw shade at Callie's self-portrait. Callie and Aaron go hiking and find a waterfall and go skinny dipping. Lena's dad's mind seems to be failing. Returning to Aaron's place, the pair get closer than ever before. Mariana creates a video to get closer to Logan, but it backfires when his girlfriend catches wind of it. Cortney leaves, severing all ties with Brandon. Stef clears the air with Tess about why she did what she did in high school.
90	8	"Engaged"	Kees Van Oostrum	Megan Lynn & Wade Solomon	August 29, 2017	0.58
Brandon hosts Mike's engagement party and it's a dry affair. Jesus makes a speech that doesn't go over well. Callie's interview for art school doesn't go as well as AJ's. Mariana and Jude try to convince the students to vote against their school going private. Gabe leaves to go up country for work. AJ joins Callie at the student protest at the university.
91	9	"Prom"	Joanna Johnson	Joanna Johnson	September 5, 2017	0.74
The university protest turns violent and Callie chooses to get out of there. Prom night for Anchor Beach has been re-located to the derby rink. Meanwhile, Mariana meets her crush's girlfriend, and she hasn't a date. Jesus gets back with Emma. Monte receives a job offer. Grace's mom tells Brandon that Grace has leukaemia. Tess tells Stef her feelings back then. Ximena faces a life-altering decision when ICE agents show up at prom; AJ and Callie get her to sanctuary. Mariana and Mat kiss and make up.
92	10	"Sanctuary"	Rob Morrow	Bradley Bredeweg & Peter Paige	January 9, 2018	0.52
Ximena, AJ and Callie are still in the church seeking sanctuary from ICE. Brandon takes Grace to hospital. The Adams Fosters offer support to the Sinfuego family as they struggle with their immigration status. Grace agrees to gene therapy. Callie and AJ leave the sanctuary. Callie and Aaron agree to take a backward step. Ximena's sister Poppy gets taken in by the Adams Fosters.
93	11	"Invisible"	Laura Nisbet Peters	Story by : Kimberly Ndombe; Teleplay by : Megan Lynn & Wade Solomon	January 16, 2018	0.70
Jesus returns to school with an aide. Callie actively helps to make Ximena's fight visible. Meanwhile, Brandon and Grace struggle to be intimate knowing her diagnosis and Mariana is suddenly courted by multiple suitors. Stef, Lena and Jesus go to therapy and the mothers discover they are treating Jesus incorrectly. Jude decides he won't game unless Taylor is a part of his crew. Callie needs to continue working on her portfolio.
94	12	"#IWasMadeInAmerica"	Lee Rose	Anne Meredith	January 23, 2018	0.62
Callie and her friends support Ximena in a big way at a conservative anti-immigration rally and get a lot of buzz for Ximena's plight. Meanwhile, an unlikely source offers a key piece of evidence that may help save Anchor Beach from going private. The family celebrates Stef's birthday. Marianna comes up with a crafty plan when three guys show up at the same time. Stef's birthday party puts pressure on her new neighbors. Jude's gaming causes a rift between him and Noah.
95	13	"Line in the Sand"	Cheryl Dunye	Dan Richter	January 30, 2018	0.56
Lena becomes the new school principal. Brandon and Grace plan the ultimate senior prank which ends up going a little too far. The seniors turn the school hallway into a beach party. Stef advises Lena to take the prank in good humor. Jesus becomes manager for the roller derby team. Stef tells Tess to put more effort into her marriage. Mariana and Mat make a sad decision about the future of their relationship. Ximena gets a stay on deportation. Grace starts treatment. Emma tries out for roller derby.
96	14	"Scars"	Kelli Williams	Cristian Martinez & Kris Q. Rehl	February 6, 2018	0.57
Callie receives a surprising tip from an unexpected source. Brandon meets Grace's father at the hospital. Stef has a panic attack at the market and gets Brandon to collect her. Tess leaves her husband. Jude tries to calm Noah's fears about his budding relationship with fellow gamer Declan. Aaron gets arrested during an ICE raid at school. Stef sees a therapist; it brings up a lot of suppressed memories. Jesus gets a new aide at school. Callie draws in Aaron's chest scars.
97	15	"Mother's Day"	Bradley Bredeweg	Joanna Johnson	February 13, 2018	0.52
Stef's mother comes to visit and helps Stef cope with a tough time; Stef, Sharon and Tess go to a lesbian club. Callie and Jude grapple with the memory of their biological mother. Brandon gets confronted by Grace's mom about the medical power of attorney. Jesus makes a heartwarming statement. Stef has a panic attack in front of Sharon. While visiting their mother's grave, they met Donald and his girlfriend. Tess tells Mariana to keep her mouth shut. Callie takes off her mother's locket. Callie gets a rejection from her arts course application.
98	16	"Giving Up the Ghost"	Michael Medico	Megan Lynn & Wade Solomon	February 27, 2018	0.54
Grace challenges her ghost by telling Brandon about it. Stef confesses to Lena regarding exactly what has been distressing her. Callie and Jude go to dinner with Donald. Mariana is interested in an internship that Emma has applied for. While Callie and Donald have a meaningful conversation on the porch, Jude rudely walks home. Mariana, Emma and Poppy try out for two spots on the team. Jude visits Donald to apologise for his rudeness. Lena tells Tess to sort her problems out on her side of the fence. Aaron asks Callie and Ximena to attend a panel discussion.
99	17	"Makeover"	Laura Nisbet Peters	Cristian Martinez & Kris Q. Rehl	March 6, 2018	0.50
Callie speaks on a panel about Ximena's struggle and realizes she may have a passion for something other than art. Callie asks Brandon to put music to her video. Mariana has two amazing dates with Alex and Logan and cannot decide who she likes more. Lena and Stef are not impressed with Jude's on-stream language and trash talk. Callie is impressed with Brandon's musical score for her video. Stef talks to Kyle about people stalking his house. The Sinfuego parents are going to get deported. Callie asks to change her major to law.
100	18	"Just Say Yes"	Joanna Johnson	Joanna Johnson	March 13, 2018	0.53
On the special 100th episode spring finale, Callie and Aaron discuss legal options for the Sinfuego parents with his legal study group. Brandon and Grace go on a road trip to Hollywood and discover a lot about each other. Mariana and Emma vie for a competitive internship. Stef and Lena go on a couples' retreat to reconnect. Brandon applies to the Musicians' Institute. Stef makes her peace with her late father. Callie and Aaron subpoena an ICE agent. Grace admits the treatment failed. Mariana fixes Emma's robot.
101	19	"Many Roads"	Peter Paige	Bradley Bredeweg & Peter Paige	March 13, 2018	0.48
The day of Brandon and Callie's graduation has come but the two are running late. Brandon's girlfriend Grace dies and he doesn't feel in the mood to graduate. Friends pull together to finish the treehouse so that Jesus can pass the year. Emma gets the internship but Mariana doesn't. Stef finally gets the evidence against Det. Gray. Callie finds Brandon and convinces him to attend graduation. Lena announces that Callie has been accepted into UCSD law. Flash forward to every subsequent child's graduation. Brandon and Eliza announce their engagement.
102	20	"Meet the Fosters"	Michael Medico	Megan Lynn & Wade Solomon	June 4, 2018	0.63
After nearly 5 years apart, the Adams Foster family reunites for the first time for some important celebrations and milestones. At the engagement party, Callie gets to meet Eliza's older brother, Jamie, who is also a lawyer. Mariana and Emma have returned from MIT and so have many close friends. Stef and Lena thought they would officiate the wedding but the Hunters have shot that down. Brandon is presented with a pre-nup so he gets Callie to look at it. Jude has spent too much time partying and not enough time studying. Jesus breaks up with Emma when he finds out she has a job offer in India. Jesus and Wyatt are starting a business together.
103	21	"Turks & Caicos"	Joanna Johnson	Joanna Johnson	June 5, 2018	0.61
The family travels to Turks & Caicos for Brandon and Eliza's wedding where they find themselves at odds with their future in-laws. Jamie extends an olive branch to Callie, which she accepts. Jude and Carter take advantage of the country's lower drinking age. When Brandon and Eliza find themselves butting heads, Brandon turns to the person who knows him best. Jesus plays it up now that he's single.
104	22	"Where the Heart Is"	Joanna Johnson	Joanna Johnson	June 6, 2018	0.63
After a turbulent few days in Turks & Caicos, the family starts to question if the wedding will actually take place. It takes Mike to tell Brandon to grow a spine and stand up for himself. Stef and Lena make a huge decision for the family as most of them are ready to start the next chapter of their lives. Jude confesses that he is failing because he's homesick. Callie decides to take the job in LA to be near Jude. Emma walks away from Jesus. Mariana invites Jesus to travel to Europe with her. Lena runs for government and so they sell the house to move to the district she will represent.
