= Andy Bean (actor) =

American actor

- Born: October 7, 1984 (age 42); Chicago, Illinois, US
- Occupations: Actor, author
- Years active: 2007–present
- Spouse: Lizzy Loeb (m. 2014)
- Children: 1

Andy Bean (born October 7, 1984) is an American actor. He is known for his roles as Alec Holland in DC Universe's Swamp Thing, Greg Knox in Power, Henry Bergen in Here and Now and as Stanley Uris in It Chapter Two.

== Career ==
Bean co-starred as Greg Knox in the drama series Power, an FBI agent assigned to the Ghost case and Angela Valdes' former love interest. He played the role of Henry Bergen, a homeless thief, in Here and Now (2018).

In his first major movie role, Bean played Spike, a physicist trying to attempt teleportation, in Bad Vegan and the Teleportation Machine (2016), and also had minor roles in Allegiant (2016) and Transformers: The Last Knight (2017). He was cast, in 2019, as Alec Holland in DC Universe's Swamp Thing, which ran for one season. In 2019, Bean played the role of adult Stanley Uris in It Chapter Two, sharing the character with Wyatt Oleff.

== Personal life ==
On November 17, 2019, he and his wife had their first child together.

== Filmography ==
=== Film ===
Year	Title	Role	Notes
2007	Neptunus Rex	Beliveau	Short
2016	The Divergent Series: Allegiant	Romit	
2016	Poor Boy	Drime	
2016	Bad Vegan and the Teleportation Machine	Spike	
2017	Transformers: The Last Knight	Lawyer	
2017	Magic '85	Fred	Short
2018	Leaving Hope	Mike	Short
2019	It Chapter Two	Stanley Uris	
2020	Transfer	Max	Short
2021	Malignant	Frank	
2021	King Richard	Laird Stabler	

=== Television ===
Year	Title	Role	Notes
2014–16	Power	Gregory "Greg" Knox	Main Cast: Seasons 1–3
2018	Here and Now	Henry	Main Cast
2018	Michael and Michael Are Gay	Jacob	Episode: "Dinner with Straights"
2019	Swamp Thing	Alec Holland	Main Cast
2023	Quantum Leap	Ganz	Episode: "Ben & Teller"
2025	Watson	Ivo Derian	Episode: "Take a Family History"
2025	Grey’s Anatomy	Aaron Gatlin	Episode: "Papa Was a Rollin' Stone"
