= The Fosters season 4 =

The Fosters
- Season 4
- The Fosters season 4 poster
- Starring: Teri Polo; Sherri Saum; Hayden Byerly; David Lambert; Maia Mitchell; Danny Nucci; Cierra Ramirez; Noah Centineo
- No. of episodes: 20

Release
- Original network: Freeform
- Original release: June 20, 2016 – April 11, 2017

Season chronology
- ← Previous; Season 3 Next → Season 5

The fourth season of The Fosters premiered on June 20, 2016 and ended on April 11, 2017. The season consisted of 20 episodes and stars Teri Polo and Sherri Saum as Stef Foster and Lena Adams, an interracial lesbian couple, who foster a girl, Callie (Maia Mitchell) and her younger brother, Jude (Hayden Byerly) while also trying to juggle raising Latino twin teenagers, Mariana and Jesus (Cierra Ramirez and Noah Centineo), and Stef's biological son, Brandon (David Lambert).

== Premise ==
In this season, the fallout of the tryst between Brandon and Callie continues. After getting suspended from school Callie meets and makes a new friend in Aaron (Elliot Fletcher). They team up to find out what happened to an old foster brother of hers after being convicted of a murder 4 years earlier, and go down a dangerous path that's filled with unwanted surprises. Callie later gets charged with a hit run felony and spends time in juvie. Because of her age the DA is charging her as and adult and she may be sent to prison.

Lena's parents have financial issues and it threatens to force Stef and Lena to sell the house.

Jesus and Emma begin a strictly sexual relationship, and are considering getting back together. Jesus suffers from two TBIs, first by a nail gun then later being assaulted. Jesus need full time care and Lena takes time off to care for him.

Jude starts spending more time with Noah (Kalama Epstein), an avid gay churchgoing Christians who has a wild side. Noah introduces Jude to drugs.

Mariana struggles to let go of Nick (Louis Hunter) after the incident at school. Mariana also struggles with the fact that Ana is now sober and is a caring mother to her baby sister.

Avoiding the rath of his mothers Brandon moves in with a single mom but finds parenthood a struggle. He goes to desperate measures in order to secure his place in Juilliard, which eventually backfires on him bigtime.

Stef gets promoted to detective and finds the role challenging. Meanwhile, offering to adopt AJ, Mike struggles with fatherhood while dealing with his girlfriend, Ana.

== Cast ==
=== Main cast ===
- Teri Polo as Stef Adams Foster
- Sherri Saum as Lena Adams Foster
- Noah Centineo as Jesus Adams Foster
- Hayden Byerly as Jude Adams Foster
- David Lambert as Brandon Foster
- Maia Mitchell as Callie Adams Foster
- Cierra Ramirez as Mariana Adams Foster
- Danny Nucci as Mike Foster

=== Recurring cast ===
- Tom Williamson as AJ Hensdale
- Jordan Rodrigues as Mat Tan
- Elliot Fletcher as Aaron Baker
- Amanda Leighton as Emma
- Kalama Epstein as Noah
- Izabela Vidovic as Taylor
- Louis Hunter as Nick Stratos
- Annika Marks as Monte Porter
- Denyse Tontz as Cortney Strathmore
- Brandon Quinn as Gabriel Duncroft
- Kerr Smith as Robert Quinn
- Alexandra Barreto as Ana Gutierrez
- Alex Skuby as Joe Gray
- Hugh Scott as Doug Harvey
- Levi Fiehler as Troy Johnson
- Daffany Clark as Daphne Keene
- Mark Totty as Craig Stratos
- Jared Ward as Drew Turner
- Michael Traynor as Craig
- Adam Irigoyen as Kyle Snow
- Meg DeLacy as Grace Mullen
- Hope Olaidé Wilson as Diamond

=== Guest cast ===
- Annie Potts as Sharon Elkin
- Rob Morrow as Will
- Lorraine Toussaint as Dana Adams
- Bruce Davison as Stuart Adams
- Suzanne Cryer as Jenna Paul
- Madisen Beaty as Talya Banks
- Madison Pettis as Daria
- Bailee Madison as Sophia Quinn
- Ashley Argota as Lou Chan
- April Parker Jones as Captain Roberts
- Noah Urrea as Todd
- Chad Todhunter as Patrick Molloy
- Jay Ali as Timothy

== Episodes ==
No. overall	No. in season	Title	Directed by	Written by	Original release date	US viewers (millions)
63	1	"Potential Energy"	Rob Morrow	Bradley Bredeweg & Peter Paige	June 20, 2016	0.91
Callie goes through the aftermath of having told her moms about her and Brandon. Nick enters the school with a gun after witnessing Mariana kissing her ex, Mat. This causes Anchor Beach to go on lockdown. Callie and Brandon end up in a junior class where the substitute teacher doesn't know the procedures. Brandon takes control of the class. Mariana name fails on to be tick on the roll call. Meanwhile, Jesus and Emma borrowed Nick's car so they could miss have sex. Swat team clears the school but Nick hasn't been found.
64	2	"Safe"	Rob Morrow	Joanna Johnson	June 27, 2016	1.05
The Adams Foster family is on high alert with Nick is still on the run. Stef orders the family to take a break from all social media while she tries to catch Nick. Callie gets badly troll from the Fost and Found website. Meanwhile, Stef and Lena decide what to do with Brandon and Callie. Brandon helps Cortney move in to her new house then he is confronted by Stef. Stef orders him home but Brandon refuses. Nick corners Mariana in her bedroom and she manages to talk him down. Jude buries Jack's ashes in the back yard.
65	3	"Trust"	Elodie Keene	Anne Meredith	July 11, 2016	0.80
School re-opens following the lockdown and security is tight. It rattles Lena and some of the parents. Brandon expresses hostility to Stef's rules. Mariana is accused of causing Nick's actions, and Callie is suspended after assaulting another student. Callie meets Aaron and he takes her for a ride on his motorcycle. Taylor takes Jude to her church youth group where she sets him up with Noah. Meanwhile, Brandon has to babysit, and Emma and Jesus get tested for STDs.
66	4	"Now for Then"	Silas Howard	Constance M. Burge	July 18, 2016	0.82
Callie starts on her senior project, taking pictures of her former foster homes. Callie runs into the mother of Liam (a former foster brother); the mother accuses Callie of destroying her family by accusing Liam of rape. While visiting another foster home, Callie discovers that her former foster brother, Kyle, is in juvie on murder charges. Brandon and Cortney are hosting a party at their home when Cortney is served legal papers her ex has filed, seeking full custody of their son. Gabe's name gets removed from the sex offender registry. Meanwhile, Mariana visits Nick in prison. Callie talks to Aaron about Kyle.
67	5	"Forty"	Velvet Andrews Smith	Megan Lynn & Wade Solomon	July 25, 2016	0.84
Lena celebrates her 40th birthday and the theme is 1970's. Jude finds a new boyfriend. Brandon needs to raise money quickly, he is paid to sit an SAT for another student. Stef snoops on Brandon's finances. Mike gets jealous over Ana's ex Gabe. Callie reunites with her former foster brother, Kyle. Mariana and Emma build a robot that is betters than the boys. Lena's dad has money problems.
68	6	"Justify"	Kelli Williams	Cristian Martinez	August 1, 2016	0.93
Lena is pushed to the limit when she discovers secrets involving her parents, her dad owes the IRS a lot of money. She also discovers Brandon committed academic fraud. Mariana gets pushed around by male STEM team members. Callie damages her senior project. Jesus wants to change his and Emma's relationship agreement. Aaron tells Callie that he is Trans. Jude learns that Noah has a medical marijuana card. After putting up with the boys on her team undermining her authority, Marianna puts her foot down and the boys abandon their team. Callie uncovers a clue that may help Kyle.
69	7	"Highs and Lows"	Chandra Wilson	Kris Q. Rehl	August 8, 2016	0.80
AJ and Callie have sex at Mike's place. Jude gets high at school. Brandon find how stressful it is to raise a child. Whilst covering for Gabe when he doesn't turn up for work on the garage Jesus hits himself in the forehead with a nail gun. Callie tells Noah's mom about him giving Jude marijuana. Emma agrees to be Jesus's girlfriend again when they're in the hospital. Jude tells Callie to butt out of his life. Gabe tells Stef he has depression. Stef and Lena need to sell the house to pay back Lena's father.
70	8	"Girl Code"	Aprill Winney	Story by : Dan Richter; Teleplay by : Megan Lynn & Wade Solomon	August 15, 2016	0.88
Marianna goes into overdrive trying to compensate for their betrayal. Emma and Jesus try to calm her down. When their robot comes in over weight, they make some last minute changes. Lena and Stef continue trying to sell the house but having everyone around makes it difficult. Callie is told to keep away from Patrick Malloy. Brandon continues to practice for his Juilliard audition.
71	9	"New York"	Joanna Johnson	Joanna Johnson	August 22, 2016	0.88
Brandon goes to New York for his Juilliard audition. Callie learns what Mike really thinks about her. Brandon writes to breaks up with Cortney. Jesus find Lena's old journal. Jude refuses to reconcile with Callie. Stef and Lena find a loophole to get out of selling the house. Callie breaks into a house to get DNA evidence. Mariana is angry when she reads Lena's journal and uncovers Lena's feelings about adopting Marianna and Jesus. Jude and Noah get busted for smoking weed in the garage by Stef.
72	10	"Collateral Damage"	Peter Paige	Bradley Bredeweg & Peter Paige	August 29, 2016	0.99
A the Bayfest festival the Fosters man a booth for "Justice4Jack". Mariana continues to abuse Jesus ADHD medication, and begins feel the consequences. Meanwhile, Stef discovers that her inquiries into Kyle's case will have repercussions at her job. Callie is confronted by Troy a grandson of a murder victim. "Someones little sister" plays at a music festival to Callie and friends collect signatures to block Justina's foster care bill, but her determination in pushing for both Jack and Kyle puts her in danger. Furthermore, Callie's attempts are hampered when tensions between her boyfriend AJ and her pal Aaron escalate. Brandon learns the fate of his Juilliard admission.
73	11	"Insult to Injury"	Rob Morrow	Bradley Bredeweg & Peter Paige	January 31, 2017	0.92
Callie causes the car to crash so she could get away from the guy who tricked her. Jesus got punched by Nick and rushed to the hospital and had 2 seizures. Jude and Noah sneak onto a boat. They have to escape after owner turns up. Brandon finds out he's not going to Juilliard because of academic fraud. Brandon says goodbye to Courtney. Mariana comes clean to Lena about her hallucinations. Jesus has surgery. Callie makes a statement to police.
74	12	"Dream a Little Dream"	Rob Morrow	Joanna Johnson	February 7, 2017	0.67
While unconscious, Jesus enters a dreamworld in which he encounters his family members. Callie finds herself in deep trouble when Troy claims that she caused the accident. Callie goes to Juvie. Meanwhile, Brandon witness's Emma buying something for Mariana.
75	13	"Cruel and Unusual"	Norman Buckley	Anne Meredith	February 14, 2017	0.76
Fed up with all of the secrets in the household, Stef punishes all the kids by taking the doors. Robert tries to help with Callie's legal trouble. Meanwhile, Callie's life continues to spiral as she finds out the juvenile center has a drug trafficking problem, while also facing the fact that she could be charged as an adult due to being 17. Jesus is also returning home from the hospital. Brandon confronts both Matt and Mariana about her possibly being pregnant.
76	14	"Doors and Windows"	Susan Flannery	Constance M. Burge	February 21, 2017	0.73
Mariana asks Emma about her possible pregnancy. Callie is still working on trying to gather a case against Troy for Martha's murder, while Stef finds something incriminating about Callie that could ruin her chances in court. There is ongoing tension between AJ and Aaron. Callie receives her case file and it is thick and unflattering. Stef gets promoted to detective. Brandon tries to help Jesus readjust through music therapy. Emma tells Brandon she is pregnant with Jesus' baby. AJ builds Callie's display.
77	15	"Sex Ed"	Michael Medico	Kris Q. Rehl	February 28, 2017	0.66
Brandon accompanies Emma to a clinic, where she debates whether or not to get an abortion. Callie's senior project is put on display at school. Since Anchor Beach doesn't offer sex ed for LGBT youth, Jude decides to join a gay dating app and plans on meeting up with one of his matches. Jesus slow recovery puts pressure on all the family. Robert tells Callie that the legal deal won't go through.
78	16	"The Long Haul"	Bradley Bredeweg	Megan Lynn & Wade Solomon	March 14, 2017	0.71
Stef's mother comes for an unexpected visit and announces that she's engaged. Callie spots AJ getting closer to another girl. Emma tells Brandon to give Jesus a letter that has a bombshell. Sharon can't marry Will. Callie and AJ still search for witnesses and have ugly confrontation. Stef and Lena host an LGTBQ+ sex ed class. Emma discovers Jesus can't read. Stef and Lena divorce is finalised so they get remarried in their backyard because Sharon and Will won't.
79	17	"Diamond in the Rough"	Lily Mariye	Cristian Martinez	March 21, 2017	0.69
Callie and the GU girls continue to seek signatures for petition. Stef is brought onto a new case at work and meets Diamond, a teenage prostitute who's reluctant to help them. When Callie sees AJ kissing another girl, she tries to rekindle their relationship. Mariana tries to help Jesus by getting her parents to agree to a treehouse building project as the twins' combined senior project. Mike wants to officially adopt AJ, but he wants to be with his brother. Emma and Brandon try to get the letter back. The LGTBQ+ sex ed class has its first casualty – Monte.
80	18	"Dirty Laundry"	Laura Nisbet Peters	Megan Lynn & Wade Solomon	March 28, 2017	0.69
After being constantly bullied by the boys in his class, Jude and Noah try to get some payback, but come across a secret plan that could ruin the future of Anchor Beach. Mariana tracks down Gabe but finds out that he's moving out of state for work. After getting a date for her trial, Jesus improves enough to be able to read. Callie joins Aaron on a trip to his family, who have trouble accepting his transition. Callie has a heart to heart with his mom. Stef comes across the letter meant for Jesus.
81	19	"Who Knows"	Joanna Johnson	Joanna Johnson	April 4, 2017	0.62
Stef and Lena confront Brandon about the letter they found regarding Emma. As Callie's trial nears, her parents and legal advisors implore her to follow their suggestion, though she is still adamant on bringing in DNA evidence to convict Troy. Stef questions Diamond about her pimp Russell, who later shows up to the group home to leave behind a phone for Diamond. When Emma shows Jesus an anonymous Twitter page with secrets posted about people at Anchor Beach, Jesus is able to put two and two together. When Callie visits Kyle again, she finds out that he has changed that won't work for her favor in court. Det. Gray shows Stef evidence of Callie breaking and entering.
82	20	"Until Tomorrow"	Peter Paige	Bradley Bredeweg & Peter Paige	April 11, 2017	0.72
Callie must make a crucial decision that will affect her entire life: she can accept a plea bargain and serve three years in prison, or she can risk a longer term by going to trial. Even though Callie is struggling with her own position, she attempts to help Diamond out of hers, which becomes exceedingly perilous. With only 24 hours to make a difference in Callie's case, Stef and Mike intensify their investigation into the Martha Johnson murder, gathering as many leads as possible, Troy eventually confesses. Lena confronts Drew about his plan to make substantial changes at Anchor Beach Community Charter School, while Mariana organizes a protest with her fellow students. Meanwhile, Jesus begins to piece together the puzzle that is Emma and Brandon.
