= Seven (play) =

Documentary play on women's rights

Seven is a documentary play, first performed in 2008, written by seven women playwrights based on interviews with seven women around the world who have fought for the rights and well-being of women and girls.

== The women ==
The women whose stories form the basis of Seven are all involved in the Vital Voices Global Partnership. They are:

- Hafsat Abiola, Nigeria, who founded the Kudirat Initiative for Democracy and works to improve relations between Chinese and African women; winner of 2016 Global Leadership Award for Leadership in Public Life
- Farida Azizi, Afghanistan, campaigner for women's rights and peace in her country
- Annabella De Leon, Guatemala, congresswoman and campaigner against corruption and for the rights of the poor; winner of 2003 Global Leadership Award for Political Participation
- Mukhtar Mai, Pakistan, survivor of a gang rape and campaigner for women's education; winner of 2006 Global Leadership Awards Fern Holland Award
- Inez McCormack, Northern Ireland, former president of the Irish Congress of Trade Unions; winner of 2002 Global Leadership Award for Political Participation
- Marina Pisklakova-Parker, Russia, founder of first Russian hot-line for victims of domestic violence; winner of 2004 Global Leadership Award for Human Rights
- Mu Sochua, Cambodia, former Minister of Women's Affairs and campaigner against sex-trafficking; winner of 2005 Global Leadership Award for Human Rights

== The playwrights ==
Seven women collaborated to write the play:

- Anna Deavere Smith
- Ruth Margraff
- Gail Kriegel
- Paula Cizmar
- Susan Yankowitz
- Carol K. Mack
- Catherine Filloux

== Development of the play ==
Each playwright worked with one of the women whose stories make up the play over a series of interviews in 2006–2007, and wrote a dramatic monologue based on these. The writers met in February 2007 to read the monologues together, and then worked them into a unified script during a Residency Fellowship retreat at Bard College. The first draft was read in July 2007.

The play was first performed on 21 January 2008 at the 92nd Street Y in New York, directed by Evan Yionoulis. Since then it has been translated into 20 languages and performed in 32 countries, as of May 2016.

Some productions have involved well-known professional actors, as when Meryl Streep read the part of Inez McCormack at the Hudson Theatre on New York's Broadway. Other productions have involved amateur groups or public figures, as when a group of senior Belarus government ministers performed it in Minsk in 2015 and Washington Supreme Court justice Mary Yu read the part of Farida Azizi at Town Hall Seattle in 2016.
