= Carol K. Mack =

American playwright and author

Carol K. Mack is an American playwright and author. She has written several one-act plays and some of them have won awards. Her plays have been performed internationally.

== Career ==
Mack is a New Dramatists alumna. She is a part of The Women's Project, Dramatists Guild, The League of Professional Theatre Women, and P.E.N. Mack has written thrillers and one-act plays. She taught a course named Life Stories, about fiction, at New York University. Seven women playwrights, including herself, wrote the play Seven due to Mack's project titled Vital Voices Global Partnership. Her play Borders won The Beverly Hills Theatre Guild/Julie Harris Playwright Award and her play A Safe Place won a Stanley Drama Award. Other plays include Territorial Rites, Postcards, Survival Game, and Esther, among others. Her plays have been performed internationally. A Safe Place was an arrangement with the John F. Kennedy Center for the Performing Arts.

Mack and Rutgers University biologist David Ehrenfeld wrote the thriller novel The Chameleon Variant in 1980, in which a disease that affects DNA is released into a small town.

== Personal life ==
Mack earned a Master's degree in Religious Studies at New York University in 1992. Her "10-room, 4,222-square-foot" home was available for purchase in February 2020.

== Reception ==
Stephanie L. Johnson of The Berkshire Eagle wrote that Mack's 1983 play Territorial Rites "is a warm, but not warmed-over look at the perpetual problems between mothers and daughters and how they try to get past the past to become friends." Johnson also wrote that the "characters are people we want to know, spend time with and care about."

Milton Bass, writing for The Berkshire Eagle, said that the 1981 play A Safe Space wrote "Ms. Mack's play has been in progress for several years, but still has a way to go" and that he feels "there is much rewriting and tightening needed, a drawing in of the lines, before it attains the desired end."
