= Jason Michael Brescia =

American film director (born 1986)

- Born: June 19, 1986 (age 40); Long Island, New York, U.S.
- Occupations: Director, screenwriter
- Years active: 2007–present

Jason Michael Brescia (born June 19, 1986) is an American writer-director from Malverne, New York.

== Early life ==
Brescia grew up in Valley Stream, New York, but his family moved to nearby Malverne, New York, when he was a teenager. Brescia attended Kellenberg Memorial High School, a private Marianist Roman Catholic school in Uniondale, New York, where he was voted "Most Humorous" by his peers in the school's 2004 yearbook. As a senior at Kellenberg, Brescia appeared on the February 26, 2004 cover of Newsday, at the time one of the ten most circulated newspapers in the United States of America, because of a pilgrimage the school took to see the Mel Gibson film, The Passion of the Christ.

In 2006 Brescia enrolled at Chapman University in Orange, California, where he studied film production at the school's Dodge College of Film and Media Arts. In 2008, Brescia received the school's Cecil B. DeMille award for "Best Undergraduate Director." It was also at Chapman that Brescia began working on his first feature film, The Newest Pledge.

== Career ==
=== The Newest Pledge ===
In 2010, Brescia went into production on his first feature film, The Newest Pledge. The film was made on a small budget, was produced by his longtime friends and colleagues Bob Burton, Nate McGarity, and Bryson Pintard, and starred mostly college friends of Brescia. During the production of the film, the producers asked Brescia to write in roles for Andy Milonakis, Kevin Nash, Jason Mewes, G. W. Bailey, and Mindy Sterling, to help ensure that the film received distribution. The film premiered at the New Beverly Cinema on October 30, 2010, and was later screened at the Wet Your Pants Comedy Film Festival in Indianapolis, Indiana, the Houston Comedy Film Festival, and Indie Fest USA in Garden Grove, California. Shortly after a private screening at Cinema Village in New York City, the film was acquired by Lionsgate for domestic distribution.

On August 28, 2012, two years after the film had wrapped production, The Newest Pledge was released across North America. In 2014 the film was released in Australia. In January 2015, "The Newest Pledge" began airing on the Showtime Networks.

=== Bridge and Tunnel ===
In December 2012, Brescia went into production on his second feature film, Bridge and Tunnel. The film wrapped production in August 2013, and began appearing in film festivals around the world in May 2014.

In May 2014, the film began appearing on the film festival circuit in the US. The film gained acceptances into the Long Island International Film Expo, Long Beach International Film Festival, Temecula Valley International Film Festival, Hoboken International Film Festival, Emerge Film Festival, Laugh or Die Comedy Film Festival, Northeast Film Festival, Sanford International Film Festival, Paterson Falls Film Festival, Catskill Mountains Film Festival, Maryland International Film Festival, and Central Florida Film Festival.

The film had a limited theatrical release in Los Angeles, opening on September 26, 2014 and in Harrisburg, Pennsylvania, where the film opened on September 11, 2015.

On February 2, 2016 Bridge and Tunnel was released across video on demand platforms such as iTunes, Amazon Video, Verizon, Cox, Google Play, and AT&T U-verse.

=== (Romance) In The Digital Age ===
On February 27, 2016, Brescia went into production on his third feature film, (Romance) In the Digital Age The film tells the story of a once-famous emo band who reunite at the wedding of one of the band's ex-members. The film stars Chris Warren Jr., LOLO, Brian Myers, as well as Bridge and Tunnel co-stars Chris Viemeister and Joe Murphy and is a holiday-musical, featuring original music from members of Taking Back Sunday, My Chemical Romance, Envy On The Coast, Vendetta Red, Ozma, and The Movielife. The movie was filmed exclusively in Long Beach, New York, and Amityville, New York, two towns in Brescia's native Long Island.

In June 2017 it was announced by Deadline that the film had been acquired by Comedy Dynamics for global distribution. In August 2017 the film premiered at the Long Beach International Film Festival where it received the Joan Jett Music Award for "Best Music". On November 3, 2017, the film had a screening in New York City featuring a concert afterwards featuring John Nolan and LOLO performing songs from the film's soundtrack. The following night in Amityville, Nolan and LOLO performed full sets at soundtrack release show.

On November 7, 2017 (Romance) In The Digital Age was released worldwide on VOD. That night the film also screened in Los Angeles at the Regal Cinema at L.A. Live.

=== Other work ===
In 2008, Brescia directed a music video for the song "Loud" by Sammy Hagar.

Brescia has directed three music videos for John Nolan: The 2014 music video "Here Comes The Wolf," the 2015 music video for "American Nightclub 1999," and the 2017 music video for "Lost With You."

In 2018, Brescia produced the new entrance music "Superkick Party" for the NJPW and Ring of Honor tag team, The Young Bucks. The song premiered at All In (2018), and has had continued usage by tag team in AEW. In 2023 the song was featured in the AEW video game AEW Fight Forever.
