= List of The Fosters characters =

This list is of fictional characters in the ABC Family television series The Fosters. This article features the main, recurring and minor characters who have all appeared in more than one episode.

== Cast ==
=== Cast table ===
Portrayed By	Character	The Fosters					Good Trouble				
Portrayed By	Character	Season 1	Season 2	Season 3	Season 4	Season 5	Season 1	Season 2	Season 3	Season 4	Season 5
Teri Polo	Stefanie "Stef" Adams Foster	Main	Main	Main	Main	Main	Special Guest	Special Guest	Special Guest	Special Guest	Special Guest
Sherri Saum	Lena Adams Foster	Main	Main	Main	Main	Main	Special Guest	Special Guest	Special Guest	Special Guest	Special Guest
Jake T. Austin	Jesus Adams Foster	Main	Main								
Noah Centineo	Jesus Adams Foster			Main	Main	Main	Special Guest	Special Guest			
Hayden Byerly	Jude Adams Foster	Main	Main	Main	Main	Main	Special Guest	Special Guest	Special Guest	Special Guest	Special Guest
David Lambert	Brandon Foster	Main	Main	Main	Main	Main	Special Guest	Special Guest	Special Guest		Special Guest
Maia Mitchell	Callie Adams Foster	Main	Main	Main	Main	Main	Main	Main	Main	Main	Special Guest
Danny Nucci	Mike Foster	Main	Main	Main	Main	Main					
Cierra Ramirez	Mariana Adams Foster	Main	Main	Main	Main	Main	Main	Main	Main	Main	Main
Zuri Adele	Malika Williams						Main	Main	Main	Main	Main
Sherry Cola	Alice Kwan						Main	Main	Main	Main	Main
Tommy Martinez	Gael Martinez						Main	Main	Main	Main	Main
Roger Bart	Curtis Wilson						Main	Main	Guest		
Emma Hunton	Davia Moss						Recurring	Main	Main	Main	Main
Josh Pence	Dennis Cooper						Recurring	Main	Main	Main	Main
Beau Mirchoff	Jamie Hunter					Recurring	Recurring	Recurring	Main	Main	Guest
Bryan Craig	Joaquin Peréz									Main	Main
Priscilla Quintana	Isabella Tavez							Recurring	Recurring	Main	Guest
Booboo Stewart	Luca Ryusaki									Recurring	Main

- ^{A} In season 5, Danny Nucci is only credited on the episodes in which Mike appears but still in the opening titles.

=== Main characters ===
==== Stef Adams Foster ====
Portrayed by Teri Polo

Stefanie "Stef" Marie Adams Foster (seasons 1–5) is a police officer. She and Mike Foster, her partner at work, are Brandon's biological parents. They divorced shortly after Stef met Lena and realized she's a lesbian and wanted to be with her. In a flashback in episode 9, when she first met the twins, it is shown that she has a very caring nature despite her tough appearance. At the end of episode 1x10, Stef and Lena are officially married, legally cementing their long-term union of ten years. Stef is very strong and tough, but is also very funny and loving. Callie initially doesn't feel comfortable around her due to her position as a cop, but gradually forms a close bond with her. While Stef likes to act tough around everyone, especially Lena, it is shown that she cares a great deal about her wife and family, although she won't hesitate to discipline her kids if need be.

==== Lena Adams Foster ====
Portrayed by Sherri Saum

Lena Elizabeth Adams Foster (seasons 1–5) is the biracial vice principal of the charter school the kids attend. She's Stef's wife, Brandon's stepmother, and the other children's adoptive/foster mother. She is good with kids, and often tries to reason with her kids more so than punish them, in contrast to Stef's often "quick to act" nature. It was Lena who decided to take Callie in after she was released from the juvenile detention center. Lena is very aware of the people around her. At the end of season 1, she is artificially inseminated with co-worker Timothy's sperm desiring to have a biological child of her own, and finds out she is pregnant shortly afterwards in the season 1 finale. However, in season 2, she is diagnosed with life-threatening pre-eclampsia and, consequently, loses the baby.

==== Brandon Foster ====
Portrayed by David Lambert

Brandon Foster (seasons 1–5) is the 16-year-old son of Stef and her ex-husband, Mike. He is one of Callie's love interests. He is very talented musically, specifically with the piano, and writes piano pieces which he presents for chances at scholarships. He has been shown to have an unsteady relationship with his father, Mike, due to the fact that Mike is a struggling alcoholic and has disappointed him many times through his childhood and teen years. At the start of Season 1, Brandon has a girlfriend named Talya, but breaks up with her because of his growing feelings for Callie and his annoyance and anger at her harassment and jealousy directed at Callie. For most of the first season, Brandon continues to pursue Callie romantically, even though she warned him that she could be kicked out of the house if they got involved. Brandon continues to make reckless decisions, included violating a restraining order, in order to be with Callie. Ultimately, he accepts that Callie needs a family more than a relationship, and eventually agrees to a mutual break up. He eventually joins a band and begins a relationship with bandmate Lou. Brandon spends his summer going to Idyllwild Music Program, where he was faced with serious competition and backstabbing. For the competition Brandon takes a huge risk and decides to play his own piece. He wins the competition and, feeling good about himself, catches up with Callie who was assuming she will not be adopted so they have sex. Brandon performs at Walt Disney Concert Hall and he writes a Shakespeare Musical for his final year project. When Callie upsets her donors they seek revenge, trolling her web site with nasty rumours, but which in this case were true. The fallout of the tryst between Brandon and Callie continues. Avoiding the wrath of his mother, Brandon moves in with a single mom but finds parenthood a struggle. He goes to desperate measures in order to secure his place in Juilliard, which eventually backfires on him bigtime. Find parenthood too hard he returns home to help with Jesus's TBI recovery. Brandon goes through misery and heartache when his new girlfriend Grace gets sick with leukaemia and eventually dies. Grace teaches Brandon valuable lessons on not wasting time and trying something new every day.

==== Jesus Adams Foster ====
Portrayed by Jake T. Austin (1–2)
Portrayed by Noah Centineo (3–5)

Jesus Adams Foster (born Jesus Gutierrez) is the biological son of Ana Gutierrez and Gabriel Duncroft, as well as, the adoptive son of Stef and Lena Adams Foster. He is the fraternal twin brother of Mariana and the adoptive brother of Brandon, Callie, and Jude. He is the more laid-back of the twins. He had ADHD, for which he took medication. After a fainting spell caused by his pills in "House and Home", he decided to join the wrestling team to cope with negative effects of ADHD. He is overly protective with his sister but their differences in personalities and values cause many arguments.

He becomes sexually active mainly with his sister's friends. He falls out with his sister in "Quinceanera" when she finds out he's been secretly dating her childhood friend Lexi. When Lexi moved to Honduras, he moves on to create a love triangle between wrestling mate Emma and popular girl Hayley. after winning a wrestling scholarship to a school in the mid west, he abandons it when he reveals that half of the team are using steroids. The use of steroids mess with his other medication.

With encouragement from his new friend at school Nick, Jesus searches for and locates his biological father. Jesus tries to befriend him but it doesn't go well. His father is on the sex offenders list because he had underage sex with Ana that resulted in her pregnancy with the twins.

Jesus and Emma begin a strictly sexual relationship, and are considering getting back together. Jesus suffers from two TBI, first by a nail gun then later by being assaulted. Jesus need full time care and Lena takes time off to care for him. He gets upset with both Emma and Brandon when he finds out that Brandon drove Emma to an abortion clinic. He takes a baseball bat to Brandon's room and was only stopped by Gabe overpowering him.

Jesus continues his rehab and finally returns to his studies. His on again, off again relationship with Emma has some highs and lows. He later helps out with the local roller derby girls' team. His girlfriend Emma successfully tries out for the team.

Jesus eventually graduates and goes to a local community college and becomes a contractor.

==== Mariana Adams Foster ====
Portrayed by Cierra Ramirez

Mariana Adams Foster (seasons 1–5) was one of the twins that Lena and Stef fostered as children and eventually adopted. She was fostered as a young child, and eventually adopted, by Lena and Stef around the age of three. She is very smart and girly, and cares about her appearance very much. She is popular and social, likes to gossip, and speaks Spanish fluently. Callie thinks she is a compulsory liar and often warns her about the consequences. She is naive when it comes to certain topics - especially her birth mother, but she smartens up about her when finally realizing she was using her for money. She changes herself for guys and friends like in "The Morning After" when she sees that an old friend, Garrett is cute now and writes poetry, she goes to a Poetry Slam with him, and pierces her nose herself for him since he was hanging out with a girl who was dressed much edgier than Mariana. Also, in season 2, she dyes her hair blonde to fit in when making it on a dance team only to overhear the other girls say she only did because she is Latina. However, she eventually gains the confidence in herself to not give in to what other people say and make her feel. Mariana has a thing for the bad boys later on in the seasons and she gets caught up into some trouble. Her ex-boyfriend Nick gets put into a mental hospital because he was hearing voices. When Brandon writes a high school musical, Mariana gets the lead. Mariana struggles to let go of Nick after the incident at school. Mariana also struggles with the fact that Ana is now sober and is a caring mother to her baby sister. When developers want to take over the school Mariana and Jude rally the students to their cause. A power struggle over the control of Anchor Beach leads to the school being saved and Lena as the principal. Mariana has several boys interested in being her boyfriend, she must make a hard choice in the end. She takes roller derby and later has Jesus manage the team

==== Callie Adams Foster ====
Portrayed by Maia Mitchell

Callie Adams Foster (seasons 1–5), is the oldest girl in the Adams Foster family. She was adopted when she was 16. She was placed with the Fosters after being released from Juvie, She was sent to Juvie for destroying a car in order to protect her younger brother (Jude) from their foster father's abuse. Callie and Jude had been in six foster homes in six years before being placed in Stef and Lena's care. As her brother Jude would say, " We'd just get settled then Callie would do something!"

During season four, Callie received her file from the state, the state had diagnosed her as a sociopath. Callie displayed symptoms of this condition by acting impulsively, lying, breaking laws, and no regard for her own safety. She is however very protective for her younger brother Jude, so much so she tends to mother him much to his regret when he gets older. She can be irrational and prone to be reactive, resulting in Fight-or-flight response.

Callie has had a troubled life — her mother died in a car accident in which her father was jailed because he was drunk driving. The result of which made her and her brother placed in the foster care system. She initially has trouble opening herself up to her new family, but she slowly comes to love and accept them as her "forever" family. Initially, Callie opens up mainly to Brandon, and the two develop a romantic relationship, although it is forbidden by the rules of the foster system, which soon meets a heartbreaking end. Callie also develops a strong bond with her sister Mariana with whom she shares a bedroom. Initially bitchy towards each other they start bonding as they both mature. She holds an on-again, off-again relationship with a classmate named Wyatt. Unfortunately, after the Fosters decide to adopt Callie and Jude, Callie learns that the man she thought was her father (Donald Jacob) is not. She then pursues to meet her biological father, as well as her half-sister who looks as if she could be her identical twin. In the episode "Lucky" from season 3, she is officially adopted and an "Adams Foster." She is also the step-daughter of Donald Jacob and the adoptive daughter of Stef and Lena Adams Foster. She is the maternal half-sister of Jude, the paternal half-sister of Sophia, and the adoptive sister of Mariana, Jesus, and Brandon.

==== Jude Adams Foster ====
Portrayed by Hayden Byerly

Jude Adams Foster (seasons 1–5) is Callie's younger half brother by 3 1/2 years, who Callie and Brandon rescue from an abusive foster home. He is a quiet child with somewhat more optimistic views on foster homes than Callie, though he has been moved from foster home to foster home along with his sister and been abused as well. Once he is moved into the Fosters' home, he quickly begins to adjust to the new lifestyle and becomes more talkative and energetic. He is seen to be Callie's emotional rock, while Callie tries to mother him but in reality he is the one that grounds Callie. At school, he develops a close friendship with a handsome and kind-hearted boy named Connor, a growing relationship which prompts Jude to begin questioning his sexuality. As the series progresses, Jude turns 13 and is subsequently adopted by Lena and Stef, although a technicality regarding Callie's birth certificate prevents her from being adopted along with him. He deals with the emotional impact of Callie becoming close to her biological family, but realizes that she will always be his sister no matter what. He later develops a romance with his best friend, Connor, and the two begin dating in the season 2 finale. In the mid-season 3 finale the two admit they love each other for the first time after Connor considers moving to Los Angeles to live with his more accepting mother. After breaking up with Connor, Jude starts spending more time with Noah (Kalama Epstein), an avid gay churchgoing Christian who has a wild side. Noah introduces Jude to drugs. Jude decides to clean up his act in season five by not consuming medicinal marijuana he was getting off his boyfriend, Noah. With the help Mariana he participates in protests over Anchor Beach Charter's privatization. He starts a webcast with his friend Taylor and it leads to online gaming and royalties. His parents put a stop to it when what he thought was playful banter could be considered softcore.

==== Mike Foster ====
Portrayed by Danny Nucci

Michael "Mike" Foster (seasons 1–5) is a San Diego police sergeant, Brandon's father, and Stef's ex-husband and ex-police patrol partner. As the series progresses, it is revealed that Mike has a drinking problem due to the break up of his marriage, but joins AA to cope with it. A frequent visitor to the Foster household, Mike is familiar with his son's family. Toward the end of the first season, he started dating Dani, who helped him to keep his sobriety. However, he soon discovers that Dani had sex with a drunken Brandon one night and arrests her for statutory rape. Since then, Mike helps Ana (Jesus and Mariana's birth mother) come to terms with her addiction and live a clean life. Mike later becomes a foster parent to AJ. In season five, Mike proposes to Ana and later marry. She is unable to attend Brandon's wedding because she is eight months pregnant. Mike arrives early at Brandon's wedding and tell Brandon to grow a spine and stand up for himself because if he allows himself to be bullied by his in-laws then he will never be happy.

== Recurring and minor characters ==
=== Cast ===
Actor	Character	Seasons				
Actor	Character	1	2	3	4	5
Recurring and Guest cast
Alexandra Barreto	Ana Gutierrez	Recurring	Recurring	Recurring	Recurring	Recurring
Daffany Clark	Daphne Keene	Recurring	Recurring	Recurring	Guest	Guest
Gavin MacIntosh	Connor Stevens	Recurring	Recurring	Recurring	Guest	
Amanda Leighton	Emma Kurtzman	Recurring	Recurring	Guest	Recurring	Recurring
Alex Saxon	Wyatt	Recurring	Recurring	Guest		Guest
Jay Ali	M. Timothy	Recurring	Recurring		Guest	Guest
Marla Sokoloff	Danielle "Dani" Kirkland	Recurring	Recurring			
Rosie O'Donnell	Rita Hendricks	Recurring	Guest	Recurring		
Tom Phelan	Cole	Recurring	Guest	Guest		Guest
Cherinda Kincherlow	Kiara	Recurring	Guest	Guest		
Alicia Sixtos	Carmen Cruz	Recurring	Guest	Guest		
Annamarie Kenoyer	Becka	Recurring	Guest	Guest		
Reiley McClendon	Vico Cerar	Recurring	Guest			
Madisen Beaty	Talya Banks	Recurring		Guest	Guest	Guest
Bianca A. Santos	Lexi Rivera	Recurring		Guest		
April Parker-Jones	Captain Roberts	Recurring			Guest	
Anne Winters	Kelsey	Recurring				
Julian de la Celle	Zachary Rogers	Recurring				
Lorraine Toussaint	Dana Adams	Guest	Guest	Guest	Guest	Guest
Annie Potts	Sharon Elkin	Guest	Guest	Guest	Guest	Guest
Sam McMurray	Frank Cooper	Recurring				Guest
Adam Kang	Aiden	Guest	Guest		Guest	Guest
Michael Traynor	Craig	Guest	Guest		Guest	Guest
Brandon W. Jones	Liam Olmstead	Guest	Guest			
Michael Patrick McGill	Coach Spears	Guest	Guest			
Annika Marks	Monte Porter		Recurring	Recurring	Recurring	Recurring
Jordan Rodrigues	Mat Tan		Recurring	Recurring	Recurring	Guest
Kerr Smith	Robert Quinn		Recurring	Guest	Guest	Guest
Ashley Argota	Lucy "Lou" Chan		Recurring	Guest	Guest	
Bailee Madison	Sophia Quinn		Recurring	Guest	Guest	
Jack DePew	Jasper Landry		Recurring	Guest	Guest	
Caitlin Carver	Hayley Heinz		Recurring	Guest		
Valerie Dillman	Jill Quinn		Recurring	Guest		
Chris Bruno	Adam Stevens		Recurring	Guest		
Hannah Kasulka	Kaitlyn Reihl		Recurring			
Samantha Logan	Tia Stephens		Recurring			
Izabela Vidovic	Taylor Shaw		Guest	Guest	Recurring	Recurring
Marlene Forte	Elena Gutierrez		Guest	Guest	Guest	Guest
Madison Pettis	Daria		Guest	Guest	Guest	
Tony Plana	Victor Gutierrez		Guest	Guest		Guest
Judy Kain	Lauren		Guest		Guest	Guest
Alberto De Diego	Rafael		Guest	Guest		
Tom Williamson	AJ Hensdale			Recurring	Recurring	Recurring
Brandon Quinn	Gabriel "Gabe" Duncroft			Recurring	Recurring	Recurring
Denyse Tontz	Cortney Strathmore			Recurring	Recurring	Guest
Louis Hunter	Nick Stratos			Recurring	Recurring	Guest
Chris Warren	Ty Hensdale			Recurring	Guest	
Tanner Buchanan	Jack Downey			Recurring	Guest	
Keean Johnson	Tony			Recurring		
Kelli Williams	Justina Marks			Recurring		
Pepi Sonuga	Sally Benton			Recurring		
Benjamin and Alexander Freitas	Mason Strathmore			Guest	Recurring	Guest
Mark Totty	Craig Stratos			Guest	Recurring	Guest
Various babies	Isabella Gutierrez			Guest	Guest	Guest
Anna Grace Barlow	Zoey			Guest	Guest	Guest
Elliot Fletcher	Aaron Baker				Recurring	Recurring
Kalama Epstein	Noah				Recurring	Recurring
Alex Skuby	Joe Gray				Recurring	Guest
Meg DeLacy	Grace Mullen				Guest	Recurring
Jared Ward	Drew Turner				Guest	Recurring
Adam Irigoyen	Kyle Snow				Guest	Guest
Mercedes Colon	Margo Velasquez				Guest	Guest
Lisseth Chavez	Ximena Sinfuego					Recurring
Reggie Austin	Dean Bayfield					Recurring
Kristen Ariza	Teresa "Tess" Bayfield					Recurring
Christopher Meyer	Logan Bayfield					Recurring
Nandy Martin	Poppy Sinfuego					Recurring
Nick Fink	Shawn					Recurring
Nia Peeples	Susan Mullen					Guest
Abigail Cowen	Eliza					Recurring
Dallas Young	Corey					Recurring

=== Characters ===
- Amanda Leighton as Emma (season 1–present): A girl on Jesus' wrestling team who is known to be independent, semi-bossy and tom-boyish. She is a love interest for Jesus and the two began dating but broke up due to her bossiness in their relationship. Emma and Mariana spend their time writing code. Emma often tutors Jesus in maths. She uses Jesus as "friends with benefits" but Jesus's feelings run deep. She stands by him when he suffers from TBI and needed rehab. She later graduates and heads to MIT with Mariana.
- Jordan Rodrigues as Mat (season 2-present): A student in the same year as Brandon. He plays guitar and convinces Brandon to play in Lou's band. Mariana has a small crush on him and they soon begin a relationship together. Mat and Brandon write a play for their senior project together. Mariana's infidelity lead to their breaking up. He wanted to get back together with Mariana, but he was moving across the country for school and Mariana didn't like the idea of a long-distance relationship.
- Alexandra Barreto as Ana Gutierrez (season 1–present): Mariana and Jesus' biological mother. She is a drug addict and repeatedly tries to manipulate Mariana into giving her money to support her addiction. She even suggests that Mariana steal something from her parents in order to obtain more money for herself. Mike helps her to finally become sober, and it is later revealed that she is pregnant and hopes to be a better mother than she was to Mariana and Jesus. Ana later gives birth to another daughter, Isabella. In season 5, she accepts Mike offer of marriage but misses Brandon's wedding because airline policy doesn't allow heavily pregnant women to fly
- Brandon Quinn as Gabriel "Gabe" Duncroft: Mariana and Jesus' biological father. He is on the sexual offenders list because Ana was only 15 when they had sex. After serving time in jail he found work as a carpenter. Jesus got curious and went looking for him. With help from the Fosters he gets removed from the sex offenders list and later works on projects in the Adams Foster back yard.
- Denyse Tontz as Cortney Strathmore: A single mom that works at the same club Brandon plays. Brandon decides to pursue her against the concerns of his parents. He uses her place as a sanctuary escaping the fallout of his tryst with Callie. He wrote to break up with her while in New York so he could focus on his music. After getting kicked out of Juilliard, he mopes at home occasional babysitting her child.
- Kerr Smith as Robert Quinn (season 2–present): Callie's biological father. He grows attached to Callie after getting to know her and, despite promising to hand her over to the Fosters, finds himself unable to give her up. He soon refuses to sign his abandonment papers, devastating Callie. He later separates from his wife because of an affair. Callie has disdain for his wealth and often refuses his help and gifts. He finances her legal defence when she was charged with a Hit/run. He attends Callie's graduation.
- Bailee Madison as Sophia Quinn (season 2–present): Robert Quinn's other daughter and Callie's biological paternal half-sister, who wants to meet her. Sophia looks like Callie's twin. They develop a close relationship. In the summer finale, she reveals that when Robert tried to send the adoption papers, she ripped them up and threw them out so Callie couldn't get adopted. After an upset Callie yells at Sophia, calling her a "spoiled little brat", Sophia locks herself in the bathroom in tears. In the second season, Sophia tries to kill herself when Callie won't accept her apology for her wrongdoing. Sophia gets treatment and Callie treats her better and they form a bond. Later she bonds with Brandon in friendship.
- Annika Marks as Monte Porter (season 2–present), the principal at Anchor Beach Community Charter School. An attractive, personable professional woman, Monte wants to focus on administration, budget and finance, giving Lena control over student curriculum. Monte later explores her sexuality with women. She had to deal with an inappropriate charge with a student. After fighting against the school privatisation she accepts a higher paying job elsewhere.
- Bianca A. Santos as Lexi Rivera (season 1, season 3): Mariana's best friend and Jesus' ex-girlfriend who moves to Honduras in "Honeymoon". She is also an undocumented immigrant.
- Alex Saxon as Wyatt (season 1-present): Callie's friend and on-again, off-again boyfriend. In "I Do" Wyatt reveals that his mother is moving him to Indiana to live with his grandmother. He returns in "Metropolis" and resumes his relationship with Callie. He sleeps in his car until Callie's friend Daphne allows him to board with her. Wyatt returns to Anchor Beach and later has sex with Mariana. Wyatt graduates with Brandon and Callie and later starts a business with Jesus.
- Madisen Beaty as Talya Banks (season 1, season 3): Brandon's girlfriend in the beginning of the series before the two broke up. Brandon broke up with her due to her intense jealousy over Callie. After this, she dislikes Callie's for taking her man. Later on she performs in Brandon's play. Later after seeing Callie's display she sympathise with her life.
- April Parker Jones as Captain Roberts (season 1, season 4): Stef and Mike's boss.
- Anne Winters as Kelsey (season 1): A girl who is sent to a rehab after having problems with drugs. She is a friend of Mariana's, and after coming back from rehab, becomes her enemy because they both liked the same guy.
- Brandon W. Jones as Liam Olmstead (season 1–2): A boy from one of Callie's previous foster homes. Liam raped Callie while she was living with his family as a foster child and lied that she came onto him, resulting in her and Jude being forced out of the home. The following season Liam had created credit cards with Callie's name on them and ran up thousands of dollars in debt.
- Mary Mouser as Sarah (season 1–2): A foster child in Callie's foster child support group who was staying with Liam and his family. Callie became worried for her safety upon learning Liam was with her. She was then taken out of Liam's home after Callie confessed to Lena and Stef about Liam assaulting her. When she heard that Liam had also had credits cards in her name she agreed to testify against him.
- Justina Machado as Sofía "Sophia" Rivera (season 1): Lexi's protective and religious mother. Despite being religious, she and her husband support the LGBT community.
- Carlos Sanz as Ernesto Rivera (season 1): Sofia's husband and Lexi's father.
- Gavin MacIntosh as Connor Stevens (season 1, season 3): Jude's classmate, best friend and, later, love interest, who accepts Jude as he is and encourages him to express his true personality. In season two, he informs Jude that his dad thinks Jude is gay and doesn't want him to spend time with Jude anymore because of it. Despite pressure from his dad, the two were able to maintain a friendship together. Later, it's revealed that the two boys kissed while on a school camping trip in their shared tent together, a moment they have ignored ever since. As their friendship continues to evolve, their relationship becomes complicated. In the episode "Now Hear This", they kiss on-screen for the first time and at the end of the next episode, Connor is shot in the foot and, in the next episode, officially comes out to his father and Jude. After finally being able to see Jude, they begin to officially date. In the mid-season 3 finale, Connor decides to move to Los Angeles to live with his mother due to his father's continuing homophobia and inability to accept him. Though both are heartbroken, Connor and Jude agree to maintain a long-distance relationship and profess their love for each other for the first time.
- Julian De La Celle as Zac Rogers (season 1): A boy who worked on the school play with Mariana and was her first boyfriend. They dated until he had to move away to live with his dad when his mother was diagnosed with early-onset Alzheimer's.
- Garrett Clayton as Chase (season 1, season 3): Mariana's former love interest and star of the high school play.
- Jay Ali as Timothy (season 1-present): Callie's and Talya's literature teacher. They call him by his first name. He was the sperm donor to Stef and Lena's new baby. Due to pregnancy complications the baby died in utero.
- Sam McMurray as Frank Cooper (season 1, season 5): Stef's late father, who struggled to accept Stef's relationship with Lena. Stef tells him to not come to her wedding. He dies in "Family Day", deeply affecting Stef who regretted never making amends with him. A vision of Frank appears to Stef in season 5
- Annie Potts as Sharon Elkin (season 1-present): Stef's supportive mother and ex-wife of Frank. Stef and Sharon will often bump heads but she was there to help when Stef had major surgery. Sharon had a series of good investment that allowed her to lavish presents on her grandkids. In season 5, she had a bad influence on the neighbor Tess.
- Lorraine Toussaint as Dana Adams (season 1–present): Lena's mother who is oblivious to Lena's biracial struggles. The two have something of a rocky relationship, due to Dana not seeing Lena as a "real" African American woman, but Dana is there for Lena when she needs it.
- Stephen Collins/Bruce Davison as Reverend Stuart Adams (season 1–present): Lena's father. While protecting his wife and daughter from racism he alienates his son Nate. As he aged, he started investing in risky high return investments that risked Stef and Lena losing their house. His mental capacity is reduced by series five, showing signs of dementia.
- Daffany Clark as Daphne (season 1–present): A girl in Callie's group home who becomes one of her best friends. She has a young daughter who she intends to get back one day. She later allows Wyatt to share her accommodation when he was living in his car.
- Rosie O'Donnell as Rita Hendricks (season 1–present): A leader of a group home who befriends Callie. She benefits from a fundraiser hosted by Robert Quinn to purchase a new group home. Callie adores her and provides proof when she was falsely charged with assault against one of the girls.
- Tom Phelan as Cole (season 1-present): A transgender boy in Callie's group home. Cole later organised a LGBTI ball and Callie asked to be his date. When Callie was interested in Aaron, she ask for Cole's advice.
- Cherinda Kincherlow as Kiara (season 1–present): Callie's roommate as well as house sponsor while Callie is at Girls United. She offers Callie advice on how to survive at Girls United.
- Marla Sokoloff as Dani (season 1–2): Mike's girlfriend and recovering alcoholic. She wants to help Brandon out in his daily struggles, even supporting his relationship with Callie until she breaks up with him. After she and Mike break up, she ends up having sex with a drunken Brandon. After this, she later gets back together with Mike. Despite trying to convince him to keep their one night stand a secret, Brandon confesses about having sex with her, therefore getting Dani arrested for statutory rape.
- Romy Rosemont as Amanda Rogers (season 1): Zac's mother who suffers from Early-onset Alzheimer's disease.
- Reiley McClendon as Vico (season 1–2): A boy on the wrestling team that brings Brandon in on the fake IDs scam. After Brandon scares away all of his customers, he seeks revenge by jumping Brandon at night and breaking his hand. He is now attending military school and is on 2 years' probation.
- Caitlin Carver as Hayley Heinz (season 2–present): A dancer with Mariana on the dance team who has a secret relationship with Jesus before being dumped by him.
- Ashley Argota as Lou (season 2–present): An attractive singer in whom Brandon takes an interest.
- Tom Williamson as AJ Hensdale (season 3 - present) A foster child that manages to get Callie fired from her job. Callie and AJ later takes a romantic interest in each other. AJ gets taken in when Mike agrees to foster him. AJ later applies for the same university arts course as Callie.
- Chris Warren Jr. as Ty Hensdale (season 3 ) Older brother of AJ. Ty was the other driver in the car accident that hurt Ana, Jesus and Mariana. He takes AJ with him to Arizona where they both get arrested. Ty gets sentenced to 18-month prison after Stef offers a character reference.
- Tanner Buchanan as Jack Downey (season 3) A foster kid that befriends Jude but has a horrible end. Callie later uses his death as a rallying cry for foster reform.
- Elliot Fletcher as Aaron Baker (season 4–5) An intern for Juvenile Justice Center, gets involved with Callie in trying to clear her former foster brother of murder. Aaron tells Callie he's trans when Callie is having a breakdown. He comes between Callie and AJ. He has an influence in her decision to study law instead of art. He remained a close friend for years and attended Brandon's engagement party. He pointed out to Callie that Jamie, Brandon's future Brother-In-Law was interested in her.
- Adam Irigoyen as Kyle Snow (season 4–5) Callie's former foster brother found guilty of murder when he was fourteen. Kyle later gets released after another suspect confesses to the crime. Stef gets Kyle to wear a wire in an effort to bring down a corrupt cop.
- Kalama Epstein as Noah (season 4–5) Young gay Christian boy that Jude meets at youth group. Noah uses medicinal marijuana and gives some to Jude. Jude spent time at school high and later realises that Noah is stoned most of the time.
- Meg DeLacy as Grace Mullen (season 4–5) Brandon's rebound girlfriend after Cortney, Grace who has cancer attend Brandon's last prom before dying a few weeks later.
- Nia Peeples as Susan Mullen (season 5) Grace's mom.
