= The Fosters season 2 =

The Fosters
- Season 2
- The Fosters season 2 poster
- Starring: Teri Polo; Sherri Saum; Jake T. Austin; Hayden Byerly; David Lambert; Maia Mitchell; Danny Nucci; Cierra Ramirez
- No. of episodes: 21

Release
- Original network: ABC Family
- Original release: June 16, 2014 – March 23, 2015

Season chronology
- ← Previous; Season 1 Next → Season 3

The second season of The Fosters premiered on June 16, 2014 and ended on March 23, 2015. The season consisted of 21 episodes and stars Teri Polo and Sherri Saum as Stef Foster and Lena Adams, an interracial lesbian couple, who foster a girl (Maia Mitchell) and her younger brother (Hayden Byerly) while also trying to juggle raising Latino twin teenagers (Cierra Ramirez and Jake T. Austin) and Stef's biological son (David Lambert).

== Premise ==
In this season, some will face the consequences of their past mistakes while others will fight fiercely to ensure a more promising future for their growing family. Brandon recovers from the assault but his hand is not 100%. Lena's desire for a baby ends with tragedy. Stef and Lena find themselves on the defence when Callie's biological father Robert Quinn expresses a sincere interest in having Callie be part of his family. Robert's efforts and desires leaves Callie in a tailspin, resulting in questionable decisions about her future, while Jude tries to manage his friendship with Connor amid their parents' conflict. Jesus annoys his sister by dating her friends. Brandon joins a band and the band's guitarist makes a play for Mariana. Pressure mounts as Stef and Lena start bickering more and more about decisions that are made unilaterally. Jesus deals with recruiters to mid-west schools.

== Cast ==
=== Main cast ===
- Teri Polo as Stef Adams Foster
- Sherri Saum as Lena Adams Foster
- Maia Mitchell as Callie Jacob
- Jake T. Austin as Jesus Adams Foster
- Cierra Ramirez as Mariana Adams Foster
- David Lambert as Brandon Adams Foster
- Hayden Byerly as Jude Adams Foster
- Danny Nucci as Mike Foster

=== Recurring cast ===
- Jordan Rodrigues as Mat Tan
- Ashley Argota as Lou Chan
- Caitlin Carver as Hayley Heinz
- Kerr Smith as Robert Quinn
- Bailee Madison as Sophia Quinn
- Valerie Dillman as Jill Quinn
- Alexandra Barreto as Ana Gutierrez
- Gavin MacIntosh as Connor Stevens
- Amanda Leighton as Emma
- Daffany Clark as Daphne Keene
- Annika Marks as Monte Porter
- Alex Saxon as Wyatt
- Samantha Logan as Tia Stephens
- Madison Pettis as Daria
- Izabela Vidovic as Taylor
- Hannah Kasulka as Kaitlyn
- Brandon W. Jones as Liam Olmstead
- Alberto De Diego as Rafael
- Tom Phelan as Cole
- Cherinda Kincherlow as Kiara
- Rosie O'Donnell as Rita Hendricks

=== Guest cast ===
- Annie Potts as Sharon Elkin
- Lorraine Toussaint as Dana Adams
- Marlene Forte as Elena Gutierrez
- Tony Plana as Victor Gutierrez
- Jamie McShane as Donald Jacob
- Annamarie Kenoyer as Becka
- Alicia Sixtos as Carmen
- Marla Sokoloff as Dani Kirkland

== Episodes ==
| No. overall | No. in season | Title | Directed by | Written by | Original release date | US viewers (millions) |
|---|---|---|---|---|---|---|
| 22 | 1 | "Things Unknown" | Norman Buckley | Bradley Bredeweg & Peter Paige | June 16, 2014 | 1.47 |
Callie's future hangs in the balance following Donald's surprising news that he is not her biological father. Brandon has difficulty recovering after the night of his attack, and also coming to terms after what happen with Dani. Meanwhile, Jesus and Emma's new relationship impacts Emma's standing with her teammates, which causes tension between them. Mariana decides to make a small but noticeable change that rubs Stef the wrong way. Jude gets the paperwork that he longs for.
| 23 | 2 | "Take Me Out" | Elodie Keene | Megan Lynn & Wade Solomon | June 23, 2014 | 1.45 |
Brandon contemplates the big decision of whether to get a surgery that could either restore or destroy his dream of playing piano. Stef confronts Mike about his whereabouts the night Ana disappeared. A mysterious stranger keeps tabs on Callie, while she is faced with a choice that could further complicate her life. An encounter with Connor's dad, Adam Stevens, creates a rift in Jude and Connor's friendship. Jesus begins to feel threatened by Emma's independent spirit. Callie receives a letter from a close relative.
| 24 | 3 | "Play" | Martha Mitchell | Thomas Higgins | June 30, 2014 | 1.37 |
Stef and Lena go to a hotel for a "Babymoon" for the weekend, leaving Brandon and Callie in charge. Brandon invites the band over for practice in his backyard and invites a few friends as an audience. When Jesus and Mariana hear this, they decide to invite a few friends over as well. Word spreads around school and the quiet night in turns into an all-out rager. Callie tries to keep the mob from trashing the place with little success.
| 25 | 4 | "Say Something" | Zetna Fuentes | Kathleen McGhee-Anderson | July 7, 2014 | 1.42 |
Callie makes an important decision to address the hold-up in her adoption head-on, but Jude may be more affected by her choice. Things heat up between Callie and Wyatt, but Callie realizes she may not be emotionally ready to take the next step. Stef takes Callie to meet Robert's family. Lena vies for the principal's job at Anchor Beach, which causes some friction in her already-rocky relationship with Timothy. When the dance team holds auditions for a new member, Mariana wonders why she has been chosen and gets an answer that she doesn't like. Jude stops talking.
| 26 | 5 | "Truth Be Told" | Ron Lagomarsino | Kelly Fullerton | July 14, 2014 | 1.61 |
Brandon's band go on a hike as they seek inspiration from pot brownies. Brandon has a bad experience from the brownie and gets Lena to pick him up. Callie worries about Jude and how her actions have affected him. Stef debates whether to proceed with her investigation regarding Ana. Emma reconsiders her breakup with Jesus. Callie sees her old nemesis at work.
| 27 | 6 | "Mother" | Lee Rose | Joanna Johnson | July 21, 2014 | 1.51 |
A medical issue arises concerning Lena's pregnancy. Wyatt turns to Brandon for advice. Mike tells Stef why he was at the halfway house on the night Ana vanished. Jesus attempts to sell his mother's bed. Mariana remains angry at Jesus for putting her in an awkward position. Carrie apologizes to Jude and confides in Wyatt. Lena loses her baby and Jude delivers a eulogy in remembrance.
| 28 | 7 | "The Longest Day" | Nzingha Stewart | Marissa Jo Cerar | July 28, 2014 | 1.44 |
Brandon reveals his secret about sleeping with Dani to Stef and Mike. Callie brings Jude along as she visits the Quinns' yacht. Jesus struggles with relationship issues. Mariana's lack of confidence jeopardises her dance-team performance. Dani gets taken away in handcuffs.
| 29 | 8 | "Girls Reunited" | Daisy Mayer | Story by : Joanna Johnson; Teleplay by : Bradley Bredeweg & Peter Paige | August 4, 2014 | 1.38 |
Brandon deals with the fallout from his confession to Stef and Mike. Callie returns to Girls United for the weekend and finds there are simmering tensions within the house. Mariana co-hosts a dinner party with Jesus. Lena and Jude are away at a school camp. Stef receives a letter from Ana. Callie and Rita rescue Bekka from a burning basement.
| 30 | 9 | "Leaky Faucets" | Lee Rose | Story by : Cristian Martinez; Teleplay by : Bradley Bredeweg & Peter Paige | August 11, 2014 | 1.35 |
All the kids manage to go to the same Mexican street festival. Stef decides she's going to fix a leaky faucet in the bathroom. Callie has a relapse of her panic attacks and Ana tries to correct her past mistakes with help from Mike. Wyatt and Brandon get in a fight with Liam. Mariana tells Stef she wants to see Ana.
| 31 | 10 | "Someone's Little Sister" | Norman Buckley | Joanna Johnson | August 18, 2014 | 1.48 |
After the fire at Girls United, the girls face a challenge, so Callie asks Robert for help; he agrees to hold a fundraiser. Callie gets Brandon's band a gig. Brandon and Lou have some tension. Connor is pressured by his father to end his friendship with Jude. Jesus learns something new about Hayley. Due to the pressure from Mr. Stevens, Lena quits her job. Sophia destroys Callie's adoption papers.
| 32 | 11 | "Christmas Past" | Norman Buckley | Joanna Johnson | December 8, 2014 | 1.93 |
Brandon reminisces about the family's last Christmas. Stef discovers that her mom inherited money from her father's estate. Stef feels her mom is being over-generous with presents. Jude tries to overcompensate because he was adopted over Callie. Jesus joins a house-decoration contest. Lena's parents spend Christmas with Lena's half brother, Nathan.
| 33 | 12 | "Over Under" | Peter Paige | Bradley Bredeweg & Peter Paige | January 19, 2015 | 1.45 |
Robert has a medical scare. Stef and Lena take different sides on several issues. Brandon is invited to attend a music program. Lena asks for her job back. Sophia tries to apologize but Callie won't accept it. Jesus listens to a speech Ana gives. Jude doesn't understand that what happens at camp stays at camp. Sophia does something reckless. Mariana's dance squad qualifies for the finals.
| 34 | 13 | "Stay" | Elodie Keene | Marissa Jo Cerar | January 26, 2015 | 1.20 |
After being put in an unfit foster home, Kiara contacts Callie for help, but she soon realizes Kiara isn't being entirely open. Mariana tops her class in a test and is invited to compete at the STEM. Meanwhile, Brandon attempts to convince his parents to let him go on tour with his band. Jesus reveals a secret to Hayley. Wyatt decides to return to Indiana and has a spare seat available.
| 35 | 14 | "Mother Nature" | Martha Mitchell | Thomas Higgins | February 2, 2015 | 1.26 |
The Adams Foster family goes on a camping trip in the wilderness. Jesus cannot hold back that he knows Ana is pregnant. Hayley turns up at the campsite. Brandon and Callie attempt to move on whilst Jude cannot stand how he's being treated by the family. The bickering between the mothers continues. Jesus and Hayley break up.
| 36 | 15 | "Light of Day" | Ron Lagomarsino | Wade Solomon & Megan Lynn | February 9, 2015 | 1.24 |
Callie connects with Robert but it doesn't go well. Brandon tries to convince his moms to let him go on tour. With Ana's current situation, Mariana fears it will ruin the family. Jude and Connor go on a double date. Emma helps Jesus with his math. Police harass Callie and she phones a parent.
| 37 | 16 | "If You Only Knew" | Aprill Winney | Kelly Fullerton | February 16, 2015 | 1.28 |
Robert warns Callie about her actions. Callie encourages Daphne to visit her daughter, but both fear their actions from their past will be brought to light. Things go wrong when Brandon and his band play at a "pharm" party. Mariana pushes her moms to contemplate Ana's proposition. Meanwhile, Jesus is given a chance to attend the top wrestling school. Callie thinks she should live with Robert.
| 38 | 17 | "The Silence She Keeps" | Melanie Mayron | Cristian Martinez & Dan Richter | February 23, 2015 | 1.25 |
Callie keeps a secret from Stef and Lena whilst the moms struggle with a recent decision Callie has made. Jude visits the Quinns. Lena is put in the middle between Monte and Timothy when he refuses to follow the school's orders. "Golden Boy" and "Schizo" butt heads. Robert shows Callie and Jude the result of the fundraiser. Mariana attempts to use a new way to invite dancers into her dance team.
| 39 | 18 | "Now Hear This" | Rob Morrow | Thomas Higgins | March 2, 2015 | 1.23 |
Mariana struggles with the recent drama in the Adams Foster home, so she focuses on organizing a student protest. Brandon puts a family memento up for sale. Meanwhile, Callie finds out that Kiara has returned to San Diego, but not in the way they'd like. She does everything she can to help her friend, even if it means disobeying Stef's orders. Jude and Connor kiss. Stef and Robert clash over Callie.
| 40 | 19 | "Justify the Means" | Jay Karas | Joanna Johnson | March 9, 2015 | 1.14 |
Stef discovers a new way to adopt Callie: by getting her declared emancipated. Lena keeps a secret from Stef about expanding the family. Mariana goes to confront her grandparents. Meanwhile, Brandon is offered a chance to become a classical musician. Jude faces consequences for sneaking out to be with Connor. Callie becomes a victim of credit card fraud.
| 41 | 20 | "Not That Kind of Girl" | Lee Rose | Story by : Kris Q. Rehl; Teleplay by : Bradley Bredeweg & Peter Paige | March 16, 2015 | 1.32 |
Callie and Mariana are confronted by their pasts. Jude faces the consequences of a bad decision after Connor is shot. Callie is shocked when Jude stands up to her. Lena confesses to Monte about her troubles at home and her doubts about her marriage. Brandon is wishy-washy about his summer activities. Stef allows Ana to move in. Stef and Callie finally get the better of Liam.
| 42 | 21 | "The End of the Beginning" | Zetna Fuentes | Joanna Johnson and Bradley Bredeweg & Peter Paige | March 23, 2015 | 1.45 |
A visit with Robert's father makes Robert and Callie see each other in a new light. The twins' grandparents make a housecall. Mariana prepares for a make-or-break dance team showdown at school. Jude takes a stand for a friend. Brandon auditions for Idyllwild's music program. Monte kisses Lena. Robert withdraws his custody lawsuit. The twins get involved in a car accident. Note: Jake T. Austin leaves the cast and makes his last appearance.

== Production ==
=== Casting ===
In March 2015, it was announced that Jake T. Austin would be leaving the show. He tweeted: "I'm honored to have been a part of such a groundbreaking series, but I personally want to let you know that my time on the show has come to an end. Thank you for letting me be a part of your family, it's been a pleasure." It was announced in June 2015, Noah Centineo would replace Austin in the role of Jesus.
