= The Fosters season 3 =

Television season

The Fosters
- Season 3
- The Fosters season 3 poster
- Starring: Teri Polo; Sherri Saum; David Lambert; Maia Mitchell; Hayden Byerly; Cierra Ramirez; Noah Centineo; Danny Nucci
- No. of episodes: 20

Release
- Original network: ABC Family; Freeform
- Original release: June 8, 2015 – March 28, 2016

Season chronology
- ← Previous; Season 2 Next → Season 4

The third season of The Fosters premiered on June 8, 2015, and ended on March 28, 2016. The season consisted of 20 episodes and stars Teri Polo and Sherri Saum as Stef Foster and Lena Adams, an interracial lesbian couple, who foster a girl (Maia Mitchell) and her younger brother (Hayden Byerly) while also trying to juggle raising Latino twin teenagers (Cierra Ramirez and Noah Centineo) and Stef's biological son (David Lambert).

== Premise ==
In this season, 3 weeks has passed and the family deals with the aftermath of the terrible car accident involving Mariana, Jesus, and Ana. Ana has given birth to a daughter but is struggling to bond with her. Mariana loves being a big sister, while Jesus is boarding interstate and his place in the house is replaced by another foster kid, AJ. Callie is officially a member of the Adams Foster's home, she is feeling secure for the first time in a long time and determined to have a summer of free-spirited fun, including trying her best to get over Brandon. Meanwhile, Brandon is going to Idyllwild Music Program, where he will be faced with serious competition. Jude and Connor continue to develop their relationship and what it means to be a young teen exploring new love. Stef and Lena continue to face challenges as a couple and as parents yet are determined to fight through them together. Mariana discovers playing adult games has consequences. Mike becomes a foster parent to a new kid AJ, who has desires for Callie.

Brandon performs at Walt Disney Concert Hall and he writes a Shakespeare Musical for his final year project. After auditions, Mariana gets the lead. With encouragement from his new friend Nick, Jesus searches for and locates his biological father. Jesus tries to befriend him but it doesn't go well.

Stef has major surgery and has problems dealing with the stigma and trauma from it. Lena has to deal with a charge of misconduct against the school's principal.

== Cast ==
=== Main cast ===
- Teri Polo as Stef Adams Foster
- Sherri Saum as Lena Adams Foster
- Maia Mitchell as Callie Adams Foster
- Noah Centineo as Jesus Adams Foster
- Cierra Ramirez as Mariana Adams Foster
- David Lambert as Brandon Foster
- Hayden Byerly as Jude Adams Foster
- Danny Nucci as Mike Foster

=== Recurring cast ===
- Tom Williamson as AJ Hensdale
- Chris Warren Jr. as Ty Hensdale
- Jordan Rodrigues as Mat Tan
- Denyse Tontz as Cortney Strathmore
- Brandon Quinn as Gabriel Duncroft
- Louis Hunter as Nick Stratos
- Alexandra Barreto as Ana Gutierrez
- Marlene Forte as Elena Gutierrez
- Tony Plana as Victor Gutierrez
- Yvette Monreal as Adriana Gutierrez
- Gavin MacIntosh as Connor Stevens
- Chris Bruno as Adam Stevens
- Daffany Clark as Daphne Keene
- Alicia Sixtos as Carmen
- Cherinda Kincherlow as Kiara
- Annika Marks as Monte Porter
- Keean Johnson as Tony
- Alberto De Diego as Rafael
- Bianca A. Santos as Lexi Rivera
- Kelli Williams as Justina Marks
- Annie Potts as Sharon Elkin
- Rob Morrow as Will
- Rosie O'Donnell as Rita Hendricks

=== Guest cast ===
- Lorraine Toussaint as Dana Adams
- Bruce Davison as Stuart Adams
- Travis Schuldt as Nathan Adams
- Kerr Smith as Robert Quinn
- Bailee Madison as Sophia Quinn
- Valerie Dillman as Jill Quinn
- Suzanne Cryer as Jenna Paul
- Amanda Leighton as Emma
- Jamie McShane as Donald Jacob
- Madisen Beaty as Talya Banks
- Ashley Argota as Lou Chan
- Alex Saxon as Wyatt
- Garrett Clayton as Chase Dillon
- Corbin Bleu as Mercutio
- Madison Pettis as Daria
- Izabela Vidovic as Taylor
- Tom Phelan as Cole
- Annamarie Kenoyer as Becka

== Episodes ==
| No. overall | No. in season | Title | Directed by | Written by | Original release date | US viewers (millions) |
|---|---|---|---|---|---|---|
| 43 | 1 | "Wreckage" | Peter Paige | Bradley Bredeweg & Peter Paige | June 8, 2015 | 1.26 |
The Fosters deal with the aftermath of the car accident and Jesus goes to boarding school. Ana has her baby and decides to keep her. Mariana spends time bonding with her sister. Stef uses her police skills to catch the driver. Meanwhile, Callie meets AJ, a runaway, who drops in at the center looking for his older brother. Brandon begins a program at Idyllwild, but faces serious competition. Jude confesses to Connor that he prefers keeping their relationship a secret. Mariana loses her virginity. Callie gets fired for allowing someone to sleep at the center.
| 44 | 2 | "Father's Day" | Aprill Winney | Joanna Johnson | June 15, 2015 | 0.97 |
Stef and Lena invite Mike to their traditional Father's Day lunch. Jude asks if he can invite his biological father, Donald, to join them. Callie spends Father's Day with the Quinns and receives some unexpected news: the Quinns are separating. Brandon vents to his classmates about how he feels about his life in Idyllwild. Mariana and Ana attend a family get-together.
| 45 | 3 | "Déjà Vu" | Charlie Stratton | Thomas Higgins | June 22, 2015 | 1.00 |
When the family becomes invested in AJ, Callie questions whether she can trust him. Stef shocks Lena with some Monte news. Meanwhile, Jude is still struggling to recover from the trauma of the shooting. Stef takes Jude and Connor to a shooting range.
| 46 | 4 | "More Than Words" | Daisy Mayer | Marissa Jo Cerar | June 29, 2015 | 1.18 |
Lena's parents come over for a visit and announce that her half-brother, Nate, will be joining them with his new girlfriend. Lena, demanding an apology for his racist comments, tries to convince her mother, Dana, to tell her father – but feels conflicted after learning that Nate's new girlfriend is black. However, she refuses. At dinner, Dana agrees that he owes them an apology. Lena's father demands to know what is going on and learns the truth. Nate, who in the past felt abandoned by his father, accuses him of always choosing his other family over him and leaves. Meanwhile, Cole invites Callie to an LGBT prom. Cole, having shown interest in Callie, kisses her. Connor and Jude join them at the party; however, Jude refuses to label himself as gay when Connor is open about it. While this initially leads to problems between the two, Cole helps Jude see the power of labels and Jude officially labels himself as gay to Connor, mending their relationship.
| 47 | 5 | "Going South" | Elodie Keene | Michael MacLennan | July 6, 2015 | 1.30 |
Having received her driver's license, Callie now forces Brandon to go to Mexico with her. Meanwhile, the moms find a pregnancy test in the trash which leads them to make a false assumption. Callie talks Brandon into hang-gliding. Mariana reveals that the test is hers and that she had sex with Wyatt. Stef, after some convincing from their contractor Oscar, agrees to marriage counseling.
| 48 | 6 | "It's My Party" | Kees Van Oostrum | Megan Lynn & Wade Solomon | July 13, 2015 | 1.30 |
Jude plans a surprise party for Callie's 17th birthday and invites Wyatt, Rafael, and the girls from Girls United. After getting her driver's license, Mariana and Callie settle on buying a car. At the party, Robert presents his gift: a car. She declines and encourages him to talk to Sophia after the reveal that he had been having an affair. Robert is still uncomfortable. Callie becomes uncomfortable with the birthday party and says that she wishes it hadn't happened. Jude overhears and lashes out, saying that when she was a child she would always celebrate her birthday. Callie apologizes. Wyatt reveals to Callie that he slept with Mariana, which angers Callie. She confronts Mariana, who apologizes. Meanwhile, Brandon becomes more suspicious about AJ when he phones someone. At the party, Brandon goes through his phone and discovers that AJ had been phoning his brother and lashes out at him. Mike condemns Brandon for starting the fight and his son reveals the truth. However, Mike doesn't want to hear it and Brandon leaves. Mike later apologizes and reassures him that he loves him. In the end, AJ presents a gift to Callie. In the heat of the moment, AJ kisses her but pulls back and apologizes. Callie dismisses his apology and kisses him back – all while Stef has been watching from the kitchen window.
| 49 | 7 | "Faith, Hope, Love" | Jann Turner | Cristian Martinez & Kris Q. Rehl | July 20, 2015 | 1.33 |
Callie and AJ go on a quest to find his older brother Ty. To separate Callie and AJ after the kiss, Rita makes plans for AJ to move into her house. AJ meets up with Ty, who wants AJ to leave town with him, and tells him not to trust Mike's intentions. While parking her new car, Callie and AJ are arrested for "stealing" the car she and Mariana bought earlier. Brandon composes a unique piano piece and shows it to his friend at Idyllwild to get advice, but his friend ends up copying it and presenting it as his own. He tells Brandon that he isn't a threat and that that's why he brought him back. Mariana, wanting to be her sister's godmother, is pushed by Victor to join the Catholic church. Initially Mariana agrees to, but decides not to because she doesn't agree with their message. Ana tells everyone that she doesn't feel like a good mom. Mariana stands up for Ana to Ana's parents. Later, a social worker comes to the house and reveals that she won't support Callie's adoption until she figures out her situation with Brandon. Lena thinks that Ana has severe postpartum depression. Lena still grieves over her miscarriage.
| 50 | 8 | "Daughters" | Chandra Wilson | Elle Johnson | August 3, 2015 | 1.23 |
Callie, now staying with Rita, unexpectedly meets Rita's daughter, Chloe. Before she leaves, Chloe accuses Rita of being a bad mother and Rita accuses Chloe of being off her medication. The next time she comes over to argue, Rita slaps her. Lena feels that Stef is ignoring their issues by canceling therapy and hiring a plumber who may like her. Callie and Brandon are separately interviewed by the social worker, where they accidentally provide contradictory answers. Through this, Brandon discovers the real reason AJ was supposed to move out and confronts Lena and Stef about not treating the situation with AJ the same as they did for Brandon. He reveals that he isn't happy about it, and everyone knows about their marital issues. After reflecting, Stef apologizes to Brandon for underestimating him and not treating him the same as the other kids. Jude walks out of a math test at school and has an outburst at Lena. Lena reveals her doubts to Monte. Meanwhile, Stef is looking for the hit-and-run driver, and discovers that the owner's previously-ruled-out son may be connected after all. Jude visits Callie at Rita's and receives good advice. Trouble brews at Girls United: Rita breaks up a fight between Carmen and Brooke, which ends in Carmen getting hit. Both Carmen and Brooke say that Rita hit Carmen, and Rita is arrested. Callie, after learning that her app may cause problems for other foster kids if they speak out, shares her own story, asking others to do the same. That night, Brandon waits outside Girls United but leaves before he can talk to Callie.
| 51 | 9 | "Idyllwild" | Joanna Johnson | Joanna Johnson | August 10, 2015 | 1.06 |
The episode begins the night before the performance at Idyllwild, the competition that determines which composer will perform at Disney Hall. Jenna's friend lets the entire family stay in a cabin right next to Idyllwild. The next day, Brandon takes a huge risk and decides to play his own piece. Monte breaks up with Jenna, who believes that she is in love with Lena. Jenna tells Stef and in the process tells her about the kiss between Monte and Lena. Callie sends a voice recording that clears Carmen's charges against Rita. However, this recording also reveals to Rita that Brandon and Callie kissed on the day of the Girls United fundraiser; because of this, Callie assumes that her adoption would never be approved. After talking about it with Brandon, they have sex.
| 52 | 10 | "Lucky" | Peter Paige | Bradley Bredeweg & Peter Paige | August 17, 2015 | 1.24 |
Stef and Lena throw a 40th anniversary party for Lena's parents despite their own relationship problems. Lena's half-brother Nate apologies for the abusive words he spat out so many years ago. Callie and Brandon have post-coitus guilt. Stef has another mammogram. Mariana thinks she needs to mend her connection with Mat. Callie must stand before a judge who will decide the repercussions of her acts, all while concealing a secret that could change everything. Callie is officially adopted. Jesus surprises the whole family at home. Note: Noah Centineo joins the cast and makes his first appearance.
| 53 | 11 | "First Impressions" | Peter Paige | Bradley Bredeweg & Peter Paige | January 25, 2016 | 1.05 |
In the winter premiere, Callie gives a presentation on her "Fost and Found" app and catches the attention of an investor (Justina) who works in foster care. Stef finds out that AJ's brother Ty was the one behind the accident. Ty asks AJ to run away with him, since he knows that the police have found a trail. Lexi blows back into town, which throws Jesus and Mariana off-kilter as they both grow close to Emma. Brandon has a chance to audition for a spot at Juilliard, but is reluctant to tell his family because of their recent financial woes. Stef's mother is concerned about Stef's health.
| 54 | 12 | "Mixed Messages" | Rich Newey | Thomas Higgins | February 1, 2016 | 0.79 |
Brandon and Callie panic and argue when they think their secret may have been exposed. Lena and Sharon, Stef's mother, argue about treatments for Stef. Meanwhile, both Lexi and Mariana run for junior class president, which creates some tension, culminating in a nasty debate at school. Mike goes to AJ's grandmother's funeral after learning that AJ had left him to be with his brother. Justina arranges for Callie to have a photoshoot. Brandon has a surf lesson. Nick, a new kid at school, takes Jesus for a spin in his car.
| 55 | 13 | "If and When" | Elodie Keene | Anne Meredith | February 8, 2016 | 0.84 |
Callie learns that Jude is spending time with a quirky teen they met at a foster youth event. Staf, Sharon and Lena argue over treatment. Brandon and Mat hold auditions for the musical they are writing for their senior project. With Nick's encouragement, Jesus attempts to learn the identity of his birth father. Mariana loses the election. Stef's medical diagnosis gets worse. AJ and his brother are arrested in Arizona. Callie discovers that someone is cat-fishing her. Sharon decides to be with her daughter during her time of need.
| 56 | 14 | "Under Water" | Ron Lagomarsino | Joanna Johnson | February 15, 2016 | 0.81 |
When Callie and Jude find out that Jack is being abused by other boys in his group foster home, they seek aid from foster care advocate Justina. At work, Jesus tries to get to know Gabe as Nick encourages him to tell Gabe the truth about himself. Mariana is taken aback when Nick asks her out. Brandon makes a play for Cortney. Gabe tells Jesus there are legal reasons for him to stay away. Mariana finds out that Gabe is a sex offender.
| 57 | 15 | "Minor Offenses" | Rob Morrow | Michael MacLennan | February 22, 2016 | 0.79 |
Stef recovers from a medical procedure. When Stef and Lena discover Callie wants to film an endorsement ad supporting a new foster care reform bill, they express concern, prompting Callie to seek out Rita for support. Brandon discovers Cortney is a single mom. Hoping to impress Mariana, Nick turns to Jesus for advice on planning their first date. The twins go on a double date with Nick and Lexi; the date goes wrong when Nick gets into a drag race. Stef tells the twins to stay far away from Gabe. Ana gives the backstory of her relationship with Gabe, making Jesus regret what he said to him. Ty gets 18 months in jail; later, AJ and Callie visit his grandma's grave.
| 58 | 16 | "EQ" | Anne Renton | Anne Meredith | February 29, 2016 | 0.67 |
Brandon's senior thesis is in jeopardy when a student raises concerns about the play glorifying suicide. The school honor board votes against staging the musical on school property. Rita's daughter Chloe contacts Callie after Rita refuses to take her calls. As part of a youth outreach program, Stef teaches a class on handling emotions. Callie discovers why she shouldn't meddle in Rita and Chloe's relationship. Jesus turns to alcohol. Stef and Lena meet Gabe when he drops their drunk son off. Chloe overdoses on pills. Nick provides a new location for Brandon's play.
| 59 | 17 | "Sixteen" | Elodie Keene | Marissa Jo Cerar | March 7, 2016 | 0.84 |
Jesus is upset when his low-key 16th birthday party is overtaken by Mariana's. Jude is excited by the prospect of a weekend visit with Connor. Mariana and Ana visit Gabe, then Mariana leaves them alone. Callie and Brandon agree not to bring their new significant others home or to family functions. Brandon sneaks away to be with his new girlfriend while Callie does the same with AJ; then their paths cross. Jude and Connor's relationship is left uncertain. Ana turns up to the party high. Gabe leaves presents for the twins.
| 60 | 18 | "Rehearsal" | Norman Buckley | Megan Lynn & Wade Solomon | March 14, 2016 | 0.73 |
Callie testifies on Daphne's behalf to help her recover her daughter. When the judge puts off his decision, Callie feels committed to helping Daphne get a steady job, which is one of the judge's requirements to restore custody. Callie has second thoughts about Justina's motives. Stef opts for more surgery and to get implants. Stef recruits Gabe to help build the sets with Jesus. Brandon has a heart-to-heart, first with Mariana, then Callie. Rehearsals continue and Gabe gets arrested.
| 61 | 19 | "The Show" | Bradley Bredeweg | Story by : Joanna Johnson; Teleplay by : Bradley Bredeweg & Peter Paige | March 21, 2016 | 0.80 |
It's premiere night of Brandon's rock musical. Mat and Mariana's actual affections for each other surface during the performance. The show gives various family members emotional flashbacks. Stef makes an unfortunate discovery after being dispatched to a domestic call regarding aggressive behavior. Jack dies at the hands of his violent foster parent.
| 62 | 20 | "Kingdom Come" | Joanna Johnson | Story by : Bradley Bredeweg & Peter Paige; Teleplay by : Joanna Johnson | March 28, 2016 | 0.77 |
An awful misfortune unites the family. Regardless of Callie's faltering, Justina pushes ahead with the Fost and Found dispatch party. After uncovering the truth, Callie stymies Justina's plans. Brandon tells his mothers that Cortney has a child. Jude questions his sexuality when he starts showing interest in a girl from school. Trying to help Gabe, Jesus puts his foot in it. Mariana is stuck in a love triangle with Nick and Mat.

== Production ==
=== Casting ===
In March 2015, it was announced that Jake T. Austin would be leaving the show. He tweeted: "I'm honored to have been a part of such a groundbreaking series, but I personally want to let you know that my time on the show has come to an end. Thank you for letting me be a part of your family, it's been a pleasure." It was announced three months later that Noah Centineo would replace Austin in the role of Jesus.
