= The Fosters season 1 =

The Fosters
- Season 1
- The Fosters season 1 poster
- Starring: Teri Polo; Sherri Saum; Jake T. Austin; Hayden Byerly; David Lambert; Maia Mitchell; Danny Nucci; Cierra Ramirez
- No. of episodes: 21

Release
- Original network: ABC Family
- Original release: June 3, 2013 – March 24, 2014

Season chronology
- Next → Season 2

The first season of The Fosters premiered on June 3, 2013, and ended on March 24, 2014. The season consisted of 21 episodes and stars Teri Polo and Sherri Saum as Stef Foster and Lena Adams, an interracial lesbian couple, who foster a girl (Maia Mitchell) and her younger brother (Hayden Byerly) while also trying to juggle raising twin teenagers (Cierra Ramirez and Jake T. Austin) and Stef's biological son (David Lambert). Some other characters included in season one of "The Fosters" include Mike, Brandon's biological father (Danny Nucci), and Talya, Brandon's girlfriend (Madisen Beaty).

== Premise ==
The season starts with Lena collecting a young foster girl named Callie fresh out of juvie. Callie gets to meet the other children in the house. On the first day of school, Callie convinces Brandon, the eldest child, to help her collect her younger brother, Jude, from her previous abusive foster home. Now that Callie and Jude are under the same roof, the pair begin to settle in. Stef is a cop while Lena is the vice principal of the local community school.

Brandon is a promising pianist, who spends hours refining his craft but he soon get distracted by the new girl in his house. The twins both get suspended from school because Mariana sold her brothers medication to raise money to give to her drug dependent biological mother, Ana. Jesus first took the blame for the drug-dealing before it was later revealed that Mariana was the culprit.

Stef and Lena decide to get married and the wedding causes a few problems, Stef tells her father not to attend as he is a religious man and disapproves of same sex marriage. Brandon and Callie sneak off and Jude catches them kissing. Jude ticks off Callie and she decides to run away. She doesn't get far and ends up in a group home for young women.

== Cast ==
=== Main cast ===
- Teri Polo as Stef Foster
- Sherri Saum as Lena Adams
- Jake T. Austin as Jesus Foster
- Hayden Byerly as Jude Jacob
- David Lambert as Brandon Foster
- Maia Mitchell as Callie Jacob
- Danny Nucci as Mike Foster
- Cierra Ramirez as Mariana Foster

=== Recurring cast ===
- Madisen Beaty as Talya Banks
- Bianca A. Santos as Lexi Rivera
- Alex Saxon as Wyatt
- Jay Ali as Mr. Timothy
- Daffany Clark as Daphne Keene
- Amanda Leighton as Emma
- Alexandra Barreto as Ana Gutierrez
- Julian de la Celle as Zac Rogers
- April Parker Jones as Captain Roberts
- Reiley McClendon as Vico Cerar
- Cherinda Kincherlow as Kiara
- Gavin MacIntosh as Connor Stevens
- Tom Phelan as Cole
- Marla Sokoloff as Dani Kirkland
- Hayley Kiyoko as Gabi
- Norma Maldonado as Karina Sánchez
- Alicia Sixtos as Carmen
- Brandon W. Jones as Liam Olmstead
- Garrett Clayton as Chase Dillon
- Lorraine Toussaint as Dana Adams
- Sam McMurray as Frank Cooper
- Annie Potts as Sharon Elkin
- Romy Rosemont as Amanda Rogers
- Rosie O'Donnell as Rita Hendricks

=== Guest cast ===
- Stephen Collins as Stewart Adams
- Jamie McShane as Donald Jacob
- Suzanne Cryer as Jenna Paul
- Anne Winters as Kelsey

== Episodes ==
No. overall	No. in season	Title	Directed by	Written by	Original release date	US viewers (millions)
1	1	"Pilot"	Timothy Busfield	Bradley Bredeweg & Peter Paige	June 3, 2013	1.42
Fresh out of juvie, 16-year-old Callie Jacobs is forced into a blended foster home which is run by an interracial lesbian couple: Lena, a private school principal, and Stef, a San Diego police officer. They share the home with Brandon, Stef's son from her first marriage, and two Hispanic adopted fraternal twins, Mariana and Jesus. Callie convinces Brandon to help her retrieve her brother from the foster home she ran away from.
2	2	"Consequently"	Timothy Busfield	Bradley Bredeweg & Peter Paige	June 10, 2013	1.70
After not grounding Brandon for helping Callie, Lena and Stef find themselves in heated debate with Mike, Brandon's father. Jesus puts his health at risk while trying to help Mariana and develops a secret relationship with his sister's best friend, Lexi. Callie gets blamed because of Mariana's transgression. Also, Jude, Callie's little brother, moves in with Lena and Stef.
3	3	"Hostile Acts"	Melanie Mayron	David Ehrman	June 17, 2013	1.25
Mike wants Brandon to move in with him. Callie meets a new friend called Wyatt. Mariana does not want Lexi to date Jesus. Talya, Brandon's girlfriend, finds out about one of Callie's biggest secrets. Jude has to pass an exam to remain in school.
4	4	"Quinceañera"	Joanna Kerns	Joanna Johnson	June 24, 2013	1.89
It's Mariana's quinceañera, so Lena's mom comes to visit. Talya is jealous about Callie's connection with Brandon and Mariana discovers Jesus and Lexi's relationship. Stef and Lena are surprised when they find out that Mariana wants to dance with Mike at her quinceañera rather than with her moms. Callie and Wyatt get closer.
5	5	"The Morning After"	Bethany Rooney	Paul Sciarrotta	July 1, 2013	1.78
With all the recent chaos, Lena and Stef realize there's been a lack of intimacy in their relationship. Meanwhile, Jesus and Lexi have unprotected sex and Brandon is jealous about Callie and Wyatt.
6	6	"Saturday"	Norman Buckley	Marissa Jo Cerar	July 8, 2013	1.77
Lena and Stef have a debating dinner with Jesus, Lexi's parents, and Stef's very conservative father, Frank. Callie attends a therapy session for foster children. Meanwhile, Brandon has an important piano audition and Mike ruins it. Callie learns more about Wyatt.
7	7	"The Fallout"	Jeff Melman	Story by : Zoila Amelia Galeano; Teleplay by : Bradley Bredeweg & Peter Paige	July 15, 2013	1.79
Lexi makes a desperate decision. Lena wants Callie to participate in her therapy sessions. Jude tries to impress his friend Connor. Lexi's parents punish her when they find out the truth about her and Jesus. Callie tells Lena and Stef about Liam.
8	8	"Clean"	Millicent Shelton	Story by : David Ehrman & Paul Sciarrotta; Teleplay by : David Ehrman	July 22, 2013	1.89
Lena's ex-girlfriend comes to visit and reveals a secret. Callie wants to help Talya when an embarrassing video of her is circulating around the school. Jesus and Mariana want Ana, their biological mother, to leave them alone.
9	9	"Vigil"	David Paymer	Joanna Johnson	July 29, 2013	1.87
Stef has been shot and it's not a minor wound. Flashbacks are used to tell the history of how Lena and Stef met and how the family was formed. Callie opens up to Brandon about her dead mother. Ana is arrested. Wyatt realizes Callie is in love with Brandon. Brandon confronts Mike about his drinking problem. Jesus gets Ana into a homeless shelter.
10	10	"I Do"	James Hayman	Bradley Bredeweg & Peter Paige	August 5, 2013	2.07
Stef and Lena's wedding is filled with celebration and destruction. Stef has an argument with her father. When a forbidden line is crossed, Jude chastises Callie for her indiscretions. Callie packs her bags in the middle of the night.
11	11	"The Honeymoon"	James Hayman	Bradley Bredeweg & Peter Paige	January 13, 2014	1.92
After finding out that Callie ran away, the family races to find her. Wyatt betrays Callie, while Brandon and Jude deal with the guilt over what they did to her. Mariana discovers that Lexi is going to stay in Honduras forever. Callie allows the police to take her into custody.
12	12	"House and Home"	Martha Mitchell	Joanna Johnson	January 20, 2014	2.14
After breaking her probation, Callie is forced into a strict group home. Brandon tells the truth about the reason Callie ran away. Meanwhile, Mariana helps with the school play to impress a guy named Chase. Jesus tries out for the wrestling team.
13	13	"Things Unsaid"	Joanna Kerns	Marissa Jo Cerar	January 27, 2014	1.88
Stef and Lena take measures to keep Brandon and Callie apart. Meanwhile, Jesus has problems on the wrestling team. Feeling betrayed, Mariana's friend Kelsey reveals a secret from Mariana's past.
14	14	"Family Day"	Elodie Keene	Megan Lynn & Wade Solomon	February 3, 2014	1.80
Lena considers having a baby. Jesus and Emma, a girl on the wrestling team, flirt with each other. Meanwhile, the Fosters visit Callie in the group home and learn she may not be returning with them after all.
15	15	"Padre"	Millicent Shelton	Story by : Tamara P. Carter; Teleplay by : Bradley Bredeweg & Peter Paige	February 10, 2014	1.83
Frank's death brings up some painful memories for Callie and Jude, which forces Callie to make an important decision. Meanwhile, Jesus and Emma's relationship grows, Stef knows about Lena's secret, and Mike gets in trouble.
16	16	"Us Against the World"	Lee Rose	Kelly Fullerton	February 17, 2014	1.68
Brandon learns Mike has a new girlfriend, Dani, and is going to great lengths to pay for the music lessons. Stef is forced to testify about the night she got shot, but what she says on the stand could threaten her career. Meanwhile, Callie makes a change to win back the trust of her loved ones and Mariana wants to steal Chase's attention away from Kelsey.
17	17	"Kids in the Hall"	Michael Grossman	Megan Lynn & Wade Solomon	February 24, 2014	1.48
Callie use her photography skills for a good cause. Meanwhile, Brandon gets in trouble, Mariana deals with some bad consequences, and tension comes for Emma and Jesus.
18	18	"Escapes and Reversals"	Melanie Mayron	Story by : Joanna Johnson; Teleplay by : Thomas Higgins	March 3, 2014	1.51
Lexi unexpectedly returns from Honduras, which forces Jesus to make a decision. Mariana learns about her friend Zac's home life with his mother and Callie suspects Brandon is involved in a bad situation. Jesus wins his first match but loses the girl. Brandon has a heart-to-heart with Dani and repays the money he owes to his father.
19	19	"Don't Let Go"	Zetna Fuentes	Story by : Marissa Jo Cerar & Zoila Amelia Galeano; Teleplay by : Kelly Fullerton & Marissa Jo Cerar	March 10, 2014	1.21
Callie's encounter with her father leaves her confused. Meanwhile, Lena and Stef come to a major decision, Jesus struggles with his ADHD medication, and Mariana gets an invitation from Zac's mom. Donald visits and signs the legal papers.
20	20	"Metropolis"	Martha Mitchell	Joanna Johnson	March 17, 2014	1.20
Wyatt returns; he and Callie embrace. The high school's Winter Ball is coming and Jesus and Mariana worry about their dates, Callie is nominated for Winter Queen, and Ana comes back with bad news.
21	21	"Adoption Day"	Norman Buckley	Bradley Bredeweg & Peter Paige	March 24, 2014	1.29
Callie and Jude are getting adopted, but a problem interrupts it. A girl asks Jude out on a date and Brandon makes another bad decision that he will regret. Lena reveals a secret to Stef. Callie gets some unexpected visitors. Brandon gets assaulted outside Mike's place.

== Production ==
=== Conception ===
The Fosters was originally conceived by openly gay creators Bradley Bredeweg and Peter Paige who wanted to write a drama that reflected the "modern American family". After originally considering a story about two gay fathers, the pair decided the subject of two men raising a family had already been done on television and began to instead consider a story about two women. When asked about the concept of two lesbian mothers raising a blended family, Bredeweg stated, "We realized that there was a kind of a vacuum when it came to stories about women raising families. So we set off in that direction. Many of our own friends are moms raising biological kids. Some of them have fostered and adopted. Suddenly, we realized that we had a story here that hadn't been told on television before." Additionally, certain elements of the series which deal with the foster care system are said to have been inspired by a troubled childhood friend of Bredeweg, who struggled in the foster system before eventually being adopted in her senior year of high school.

=== Development ===
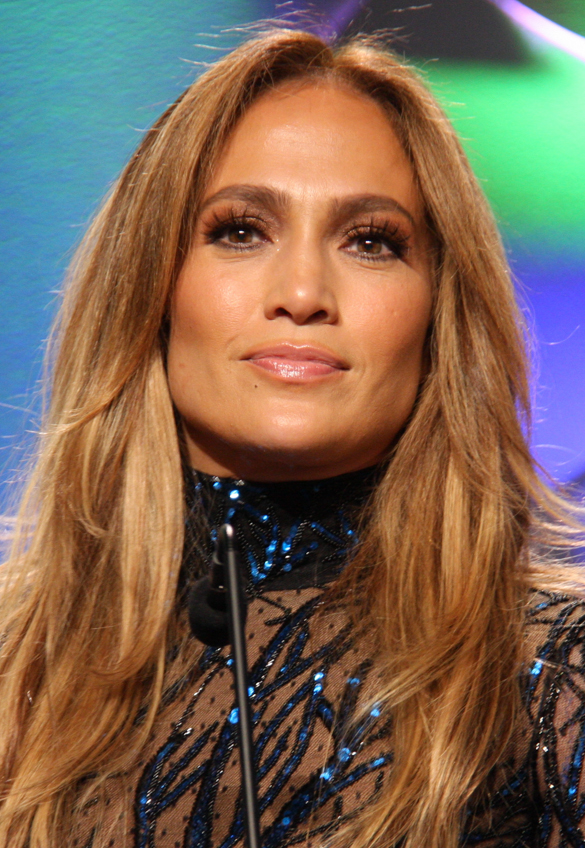
Executive producer Jennifer Lopez

When developing the concept, Bredeweg and Paige were initially met with some resistance from Hollywood, with Bredeweg recounting, "[T]here were some people around us, some people in town who said, 'You know, it is just not going to happen. You are never going to sell this show.'" After completing the first draft of the pilot script, the team was introduced to Jennifer Lopez through a friend who worked at her production company Nuyorican Productions, which was looking to branch out into scripted television. When describing their initial pitch to Lopez, Bredeweg stated, "When we met with Jennifer, she really fell in love with it. The moment we had her, we knew that we had a force behind us."

Lopez's decision to become involved in the project is said to have been largely inspired by her late Aunt Marisa, Lopez's mother's gay elder sister who had faced discrimination during her lifetime due to her sexual orientation and was unable to have a family of her own. When discussing the show's concept, Lopez stated, "Although [the script] was about a non-traditional family and had some newer themes, it had some really basic themes as well about family and love and what's really important. And life can be complicated and messy sometimes and not simple. It gives a really good depiction of family in this day and age."

With Lopez on board, the team took the concept to several networks, including ABC Family, with Bredeweg recalling, "ABC Family was really receptive from the very beginning. Strangely, it felt a little like a match made in heaven. I mean, their slogan is 'A new kind of family.' We had a new kind of modern family, and it took off from there." On July 6, 2012, The Hollywood Reporter, among other sources, reported that Jennifer Lopez and her production company, Nuyorican Productions, were developing the yet-to-be-titled hour-long drama for ABC Family, with Lopez set to executive produce alongside Simon Fields and Greg Gugliotta, as well as showrunners and head writers Peter Paige and Brad Bredeweg.

Finally, the first televised promo appeared on ABC Family on April 19, 2013.

=== Casting ===
On August 23, 2012, sources reported that ABC Family had ordered a pilot for The Fosters, a series which would tell the story of a lesbian couple raising a "21st-century" multi-ethnic mix of foster and biological children. On September 24, 2012, it was reported that Teri Polo and Sherri Saum had been cast to star in the pilot as the two leads, Stef Adams Foster and Lena Adams Foster respectively.

On February 6, 2013, it was reported that ABC Family had picked up the show, with production set to begin that spring for a summer 2013 premiere. The rest of the principal cast was also announced at that time, including Danny Nucci as Stef's ex-husband Mike Foster, David Lambert as their biological son Brandon Foster, Jake T. Austin and Cierra Ramirez as Stef and Lena's adopted twins Jesus and Mariana Foster, and Maia Mitchell and Hayden Byerly as their foster children Callie and Jude Jacob.

When recounting the casting process, Bredeweg explained, "[W]e spent tireless hours trying to find the right person for each role. Then they all began to line up—it was like dominos—the moment we found our Lena, the moment we found our Callie, the moment we found our Stef, it sort of all started to line up perfectly for us." On April 11, 2013, TV Guide unveiled the first official cast photo of The Fosters.
