= Valerie Brandy =

American actress, director and screenwriter

- Born: 18 August 1990 (age 36); Santa Barbara
- Education: University of California, Los Angeles
- Occupations: Actress, Director, Screenwriter
- Years active: 2009–present

Valerie Brandy is an American actress, director, and screenwriter. She is best known for her recurring role as Trixie on FX's Justified, and for her performance as Lola in the feature film Lola's Last Letter, which she also wrote and directed. The film premiered at the TCL Chinese Theatre in Hollywood as a competition feature at Dances with Films Festival, and earned Brandy a Best Principal Actress Nomination from the Los Angeles Film Review.

== Career ==
Valerie Brandy had a recurring role in season 3 of Justified as Trixie, a drug addict and informant for the villain Limehouse. Trixie had a family connection to Noble's Holler, as her mother had taken up refuge there. Brandy's story arc on the show ended when her character was shot by Tanner Dodd.

Brandy's first original feature screenplay Dying with Daisy was a quarterfinalist in the Nicholl Fellowships in Screenwriting, administered by the Academy of Motion Picture Arts and Sciences.

In 2015, Brandy made her directorial debut in the independent feature film Lola's Last Letter, which she also wrote and starred in. The film co-starred Annamarie Kenoyer and Travis Quentin Young. The movie was released in 2016 after its World Premiere at the TCL Chinese Theatre in Hollywood as a Competition Feature at Dances with Films Festival. She was nominated by the Los Angeles Film Review for a Best Principal Actress Award for her role as Lola.

In 2016, Women & Hollywood chose Lola's Last Letter as a VOD pick of the month.

== Awards and nominations ==
Year	Award	Category	Nominated work	Result
2011	Nicholl Fellowships in Screenwriting	Best Original Feature Screenplay	Dying with Daisy	Quarterfinalist
2015	Los Angeles Film Review	Best Principal Actress in a Feature Film	Lola's Last Letter	Nominated
