= Lola's Last Letter =

- Festival Release Poster
- Directed by: Valerie Brandy
- Written by: Valerie Brandy
- Produced by: Sherri Lennon; Little Leo Media
- Starring: Valerie Brandy; Annamarie Kenoyer; Travis Quentin Young; Peter Banifaz; Tom Colitt
- Cinematography: Katie Walker
- Release date: June 5, 2015 (Dances with Films)
- Running time: 81 minutes
- Country: United States
- Language: English

Lola's Last Letter is a 2015 independent drama-comedy film written and directed by Valerie Brandy, starring Valerie Brandy, Annamarie Kenoyer, and Travis Quentin Young. The movie world-premiered at the TCL Chinese Theatre in Hollywood as a Competition Feature at the Dances with Films festival lineup. Brandy made the film—also her directorial debut—on a shoe-string budget with just seven people over seven days of principal photography, and shot entirely in Los Angeles and surrounding areas.

The film follows Lola, an ex-con completing her community service by picking up trash on the side of the road, as she makes a video apology letter for a mysterious man named Henry. As part of the film's outreach campaign, the filmmakers collected thousands of anonymous apology letters from fans online.

== Plot ==
The film follows Lola, a 22-year-old ex-con who spends her time completing her community service by picking up trash on the side of the highway, as she makes a video letter for her mysterious pen-pal "Henry." Although Henry's identity is not revealed until the end of the film, the audience is given a window into Lola's world and her relationships. Through her video antics, which range from darkly humorous to heartbreakingly honest, we discover a girl who's full of contradictions. Tugged in opposite directions by her best friend Ree, and her new love interest Sam (Travis Quentin Young), Lola tries to piece her life back together in the aftermath of a huge mistake.

== Cast ==
- Valerie Brandy as Lola
- Annamarie Kenoyer as Ree
- Travis Quentin Young as Sam
- Peter Banifaz as Pete
- Tom Colitt as Tim

== Production ==
The film was made on a micro-budget in and around Los Angeles and surrounding areas, often utilizing the homes of cast and crew as locations. Brandy cast the film entirely from actors she knew, and the actors (including Brandy) all knew each other previously from being alumni or current students of Doug Warhit's acting class in Beverly Hills. Brandy edited the film herself, but has stated that she chose not to officially assign a credit.

== Release ==
Lola's Last Letter world-premiered on June 5, 2015 at the Dances with Films Festival as part of their Competition Lineup. It is scheduled to screen at the Napa Valley Film Festival in the fall of 2015, marking its Northern California premiere. The film will be more widely released in the United States after completing its festival run.

== Reception ==
Lola's Last Letter was well received by critics, garnering a five-star review from Examiner.com. Jason Coleman of Starpulse stated that the film was, "...an original and at times heartbreaking drama," and called Brandy's portrayal of Lola, "breathtakingly real and raw... her work utterly unforgettable." The chemistry between Valerie Brandy and Travis Quentin Young was particularly well received by audiences and critics, and Jennifer O'Connell of the Examiner stated that Young "is a revelation as Sam, evoking old Hollywood leading man charm and presence. He is alluring and charismatic, with Clark Gable swagger and sexiness." Of Brandy and Young's performances she wrote, "Their chemistry is sweet, silly, and passionate, evoking all the happiness and warm fuzzies that young love does. They make the courtship and deepening relationship believable and fun to watch, a perfect augment to the heaviness of the subject."

Brandy received a Best Principal Actress Nomination from Los Angeles Film Review for her performance as Lola.
