= Regina Louise =

American author, child advocate, and motivational speaker

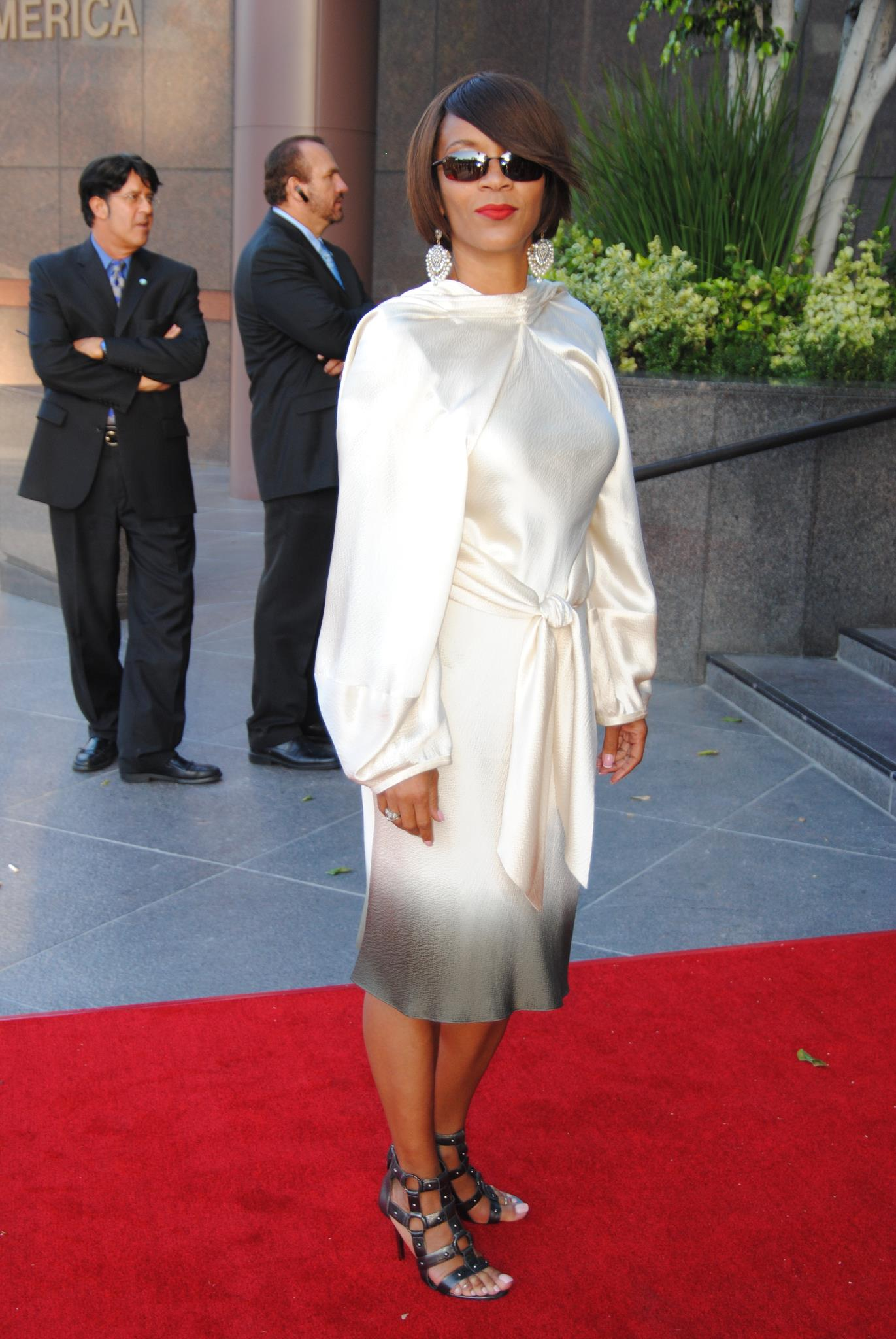
- Regina Louise Kerr-Taylor
- Born: May 2, 1963 (age 63); Austin, Texas, United States
- Occupation: Author

Regina Louise Kerr-Taylor is an American author, child advocate, and motivational speaker, who is best known for successfully navigating through more than thirty foster home placements as a ward of the California Juvenile Court system. Louise is the second child of the late singer/songwriter Tom Brock. Brock abandoned his daughter into the foster care system during the late-1970s to pursue musical interests.

== Biography ==
Regina Louise was born May 2, 1963, in Austin, TX. She attended Molly Dawson elementary school and left at the age of eleven. Due to her father's estrangement, Regina turned herself in to the Richmond Police Department and was taken into custody the day before her thirteenth birthday. Louise bonded with Jeanne Kerr, who worked as a nurse at the shelter. Kerr expressed a willingness to adopt Louise, but a Contra Costa County court denied her petition.

Louise lived in over 30 foster homes, group homes and psychiatric facilities before age 18. She now speaks and coaches organizations and individuals on issues of trauma and personal development, and is a foster care abolitionist. She currently resides in the San Francisco Bay Area.

Author of the memoir Somebody's Someone, Louise has appeared on National Public Radio's All Things Considered KQED Forum, CBC, BBC and the CBS Early Show. Louise and her story have also been covered in various newspapers and magazines. After the 2003 release of Somebody's Someone, Louise was able to reconnect with Kerr, now married to a man with the last name Taylor. On Nov. 20, 2003, in the same Contra Costa County courthouse where a judge had denied Kerr's request to adopt Louise decades ago, Kerr, then 59, adopted Louise, then 41, who then made Kerr-Taylor her legal last name. Her second memoir, Someone Has Led This Child to Believe: A Case History of Love, was released July 10, 2018.

== Film ==
On April 20, 2019, Lifetime released I Am Somebody's Child: The Regina Louise Story. The film stars Angela Fairley as Regina Louise, Ginnifer Goodwin as Jeanne Kerr, Monique Coleman as Ms. Lewis, Sherri Saum as an adult Regina Louise, and Kim Hawthorne as Gwen Ford.
