= Den Brother =

- Promotional poster
- Teleplay by: James Krieg
- Story by: Michael Horowitz
- Directed by: Mark L. Taylor
- Starring: Hutch Dano; G. Hannelius; Maurice Godin; David Lambert; Kelsey Chow; Debra Mooney; Vicki Lewis
- Theme music composer: John Van Tongeren
- Country of origin: United States
- Original language: English

Production
- Producer: Mosquito Productions
- Cinematography: David A. Makin
- Editor: Mark Conte
- Running time: 89 minutes
- Production companies: Salty Pictures; Lion Share Productions

Original release
- Network: Disney Channel
- Release: August 13, 2010

Den Brother is a 2010 American comedy-drama film released as a Disney Channel Original Movie. It stars Hutch Dano and G Hannelius. The film premiered on August 13, 2010 on Disney Channel.

== Plot ==
Alex Pearson (Hutch Dano) is a self-absorbed, but avid Lemon Oaks High School hockey player who is seeking the attention of Matisse Burrows (Kelsey Chow), the most beautiful girl in school. Alex also wants a car, but his widowed father Jasper refuses to help financially, stating that Alex's "attitude" needs to improve, citing Alex's recent suspension from the hockey team for showboating; Alex also wants a spot on the All-Stars hockey team, but his tendency to showboat prevents him from getting on. In order to become more creditable with his father, Alex has to do chores and babysit his little sister, Emily (G. Hannelius). Meanwhile, the leader of Emily's Bumble Bee troop has just been informed her husband got a great job offer in another part of the country, and hastily leaves without arranging for a successor, which the girls worry their troop will be dissolved. Alex tells the girls he will be the substitute scoutmaster, and he uses the alias of "Mrs. Zamboni" to fool parents and the Bumblebee council.

The Bumble Bee troop has to work to be able to attend the Camporee, the most important Bumble Bee event of the year, by selling cookies and completing various badges. Alex helps the girls earn the badges, and they in turn help him get a date with Matisse, who is a senior Bumble Bee. At the same time, he also stands up for the other Den Mothers to Dina (Vicki Lewis), a very controlling Den Mother.

Alex accidentally reveals himself when, during a muffin sale at the big hockey game, the coach wonders where Alex is as his suspension is over. Alex puts himself in, still disguised as Mrs. Zamboni, to win the game. However, his actions disqualifies his troop, alienates his best friend, and disappoints his sister and father. Afterwards, Emily refuses to talk to him and his father refuses to punish him, knowing that Alex will punish himself. After returning a runaway dog to one of his neighbors, Mrs. Jacklitts, Alex learns that she used to be a Bumble Bee leader herself. Alex's mother, who died two years ago, had been a Bumble Bee in Mrs. Jacklitt's old troop.

Upon learning this, Alex makes a deal with her to help out around the house in exchange for her being the new Den Mother. After introducing her to the troop, she convinces them to forgive Alex, who goes to the finals for his hockey game. There, he apologizes to his team and offers the captaincy to Goose (David Lambert), who refuses, saying he wants Alex to be the real captain. During the game, Alex acts as a distraction instead of hogging the puck to himself, allowing his team to win. Alex clears the way for Goose to make the winning point, causing Goose to get the All-Star spot Alex wanted. The Bumble Bees show up with Alex's father; Emily forgives Alex and reveals that they want Alex to be their Den Mother, to which Alex accepts.

At the Camporee, Alex claims he is the Den Mother. Dina disapproves and tries to get Alex to quit saying all Den Mothers must be in a Bumble Bee uniform, which Alex is not. Not wanting to let his troop down, Alex puts on a Bumble Bee uniform with the help of Matisse, who forgives Alex for his past behavior. Dina is infuriated and asks her husband (the hockey official who originally suspended Alex), to do something about it. However, he is pleased with Alex's attitude, especially learning that he gave up the winning goal so that Goose could get in, and offers him a spot on the All-Stars. Alex gleefully accepts as long as it works around his troop's schedule, to which the hockey official happily agrees. Everyone celebrates Alex’s new behavior and responsibilities, including Matisse who kisses Alex on the cheek, indicating that she is Alex’s new girlfriend.

== Cast ==
- Hutch Dano as Alex Pearson, the den brother of Troop 57
- G. Hannelius as Emily Pearson, Alex's younger sister and the leader of Troop 57
- Maurice Godin as Jasper Pearson, Alex's widowed father
- David Lambert as Danny "Goose" Gustavo, Alex's best friend
- Kelsey Chow as Matisse Burrows, Alex's love interest and the den mother of Troop 18
- Debra Mooney as Allie Jacklitz, Alex's neighbor
- Vicki Lewis as Dina Reams, the den mother of Troop 66
- Kelly Gould as Rachel, the member of Troop 57
- Kiara Muhammad as Ursula, the member of Troop 57
- Taylar Hender as Abigail, the member of Troop 57
- Haley Tju as Tina, the member of Troop 57
- Rick Dano (real-life father of Hutch Dano) makes a cameo as Delivery Man

== Production ==
The film was shot in early 2010 on location in Salt Lake City, Utah.

== Reception ==
The movie premiere generated 3.7 million viewers. The film grew its audience from the beginning with 3.08 million viewers to eventually peaked with 4.3 million viewers in its final quarter-hour; it also topped its premiere night.

== See also ==
- List of films about ice hockey
