= April Parker Jones =

American television actress (born 1976)

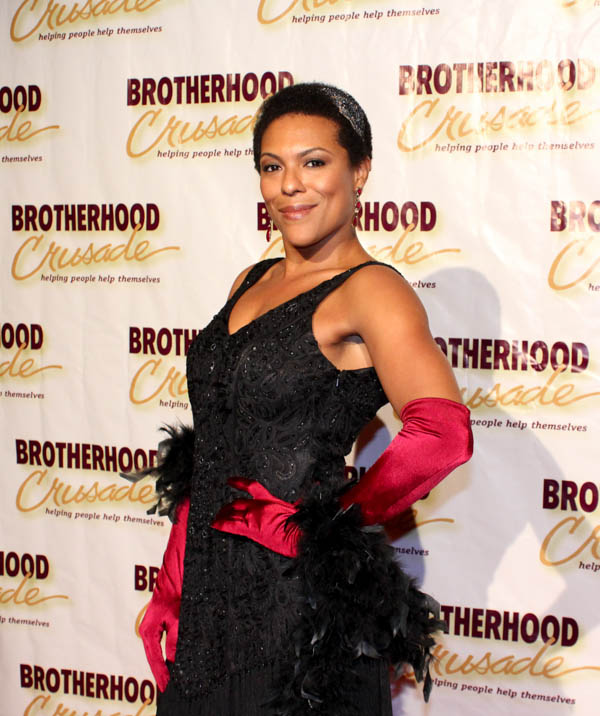
- Parker Jones at the 2014 Pioneer of African American Achievement Awards Gala
- Born: March 6, 1976 (age 50); Durham, North Carolina, U.S.
- Occupation: Actress
- Years active: 2002–present
- Spouse: Joseph J. Jones (m. 2007)
- Children: 2

April Parker Jones (born March 6, 1976) is an American television actress, best known for her roles as Darcy Hawkins in the CBS post-apocalyptic drama series Jericho from 2006 to 2008, and as Natalie Henning in the Oprah Winfrey Network prime time soap opera, If Loving You Is Wrong (2014–2020). In 2018, she starred in the CW superhero series, Supergirl as Colonel Lauren Haley.

== Life and career ==
Parker was born in Durham, North Carolina and attended North Carolina Central University before moving to New York. After guest-starring role on CSI: Miami, in 2006 she won the series regular role of Darcy Hawkins in the CBS series Jericho. The series was canceled after two seasons and Parker Jones later appeared on Lost, The Unit, NCIS, Scandal, and had recurring roles in 90210 and The Fosters.

In 2014, Parker Jones was cast as one of leads in the Oprah Winfrey Network prime time soap opera, If Loving You Is Wrong. She plays the role of Natalie Henning, the single working mother. The series also stars Edwina Findley, Zulay Henao, Heather Hemmens, and Amanda Clayton. In 2015, she also had the recurring role as detective Claire Bryce in the ShondaLand's legal thriller How to Get Away with Murder, and the following year on Lifetime comedy-drama, Devious Maids.

In 2018, Parker starred as Gen. Anita DuFine in the final season of TNT drama series, The Last Ship, and later was cast in a series regular role as Lauren Haley in the fourth season of The CW superhero series, Supergirl. In 2022, Parker was cast in a recurring role on the Peacock drama series, Bel-Air, and co-starred opposite Joey King in the romantic drama film The In Between. Later she was cast as title character's mother in the CW series, Tom Swift.

== Personal life ==
In June 2007, Parker married fellow actor Joseph J. Jones; they have two children together. Their son, Will, died in 2018.

== Filmography ==
=== Film ===
Year	Title	Role	Notes
2002	Joy	Bayo	
2004	Love Aquarium	Gayl	Short
2007	Spider-Man 3	Test Site Technician	
2008	Sleeping	Mrs. Winter	Short
2010	Nose Candy	Jada	Short
2011	Have a Little Faith	Wilma Covington	TV movie
2012	Heaven	Heaven	Short
2014	Return to Zero	Dr. Campbell's Nurse	
2022	The In Between	Jasmine	
2022	Hunther	Morgan	

=== Television ===
Year	Title	Role	Notes
2006	CSI: Miami	Dr. Medby	Episode: "Fade Out"
2006–08	Jericho	Darcy Hawkins	Recurring Cast
2007	ER	Joyce	Episode: "300 Patients"
2007–08	The Young and the Restless	Doctor	Regular Cast
2008	Lost	Dr. Erica Stevenson	Episode: "Something Nice Back Home"
2008	The Unit	Principal Green	Episode: "Sex Trade" & "The Conduit"
2009	Lie to Me	Head Mistress Jonas	Episode: "A Perfect Score"
2009	NCIS	Elaine Davis	Episode: "Bounce"
2009–10	90210	Dana Bowen	Guest: Season 1, Recurring Cast: Season 2
2010	NCIS: Los Angeles	Susan Brosnan	Episode: "Hunted"
2010	The Defenders	AAG Rowe	Episode: "Nevada v. Dennis"
2011	The Chicago Code	Bernadette Prentiss	Episode: "St. Valentine's Day Massacre"
2011	Prime Suspect	Nancy	Episode: "Underwater"
2013	Scandal	Doctor	Episode: "Truth or Consequences"
2013	Masters of Sex	Mrs. Katcher	Episode: "Race To Space"
2013–17	The Fosters	Captain Roberts	Recurring Cast: Season 1, Guest: Season 4
2014	Legends	Special Agent Diane Kitson	Episode: "Chemistry"
2014–19	If Loving You Is Wrong	Natalie Henning	Main Cast: Season 1-4
2015	How to Get Away with Murder	Detective Claire Bryce	Recurring Cast: Season 1
2016	Mad Dogs	Paris	Episode: "Needles"
2016	Devious Maids	Detective Shaw	Recurring Cast: Season 4
2018	The Resident	Dr. Jen Kays	Recurring Cast: Season 1
2018	The Last Ship	Gen. Anita DuFine	Main Cast: Season 5
2018–19	Supergirl	Lauren Haley	Main Cast: Season 4
2019	All American	Dr. Harriet Gibbs	Episode: "Coming Home"
2019–22	S.W.A.T.	Winnie Harrelson	Recurring Cast: Season 3, Guest: Season 4-5
2022	NCIS: Hawai'i	Valerie Dalies	Episode: "Spies, Part 1"
2022	Tom Swift	Lorraine Swift	Main Cast
2022–23	Bel-Air	Viola 'Vy' Smith	Recurring Cast: Season 1, Guest: Season 2
2023	The Michael Blackson Show	Ms. Randolf	Main Cast
2023	The Other Black Girl	Present Day Kendra Rae	Episode: "Down with Disease"
2024	Tracker	Dr. Iris Blair	Episode: "Ontological Shock"
2025	Reasonable Doubt	Rosie Edwards	Recurring Cast: Season 3
2026	Watson	Marlise Garner	Episode: "Wrongful Life"
