= Hayden Byerly =

American actor

- Born: October 11, 2000 (age 26); Lakewood, Colorado, U.S.
- Occupation: Actor
- Years active: 2011–present

Hayden Byerly (born October 11, 2000) is an American actor. Beginning his professional career as a child actor at the age of 10, Byerly is best known for his role as Jude Adams Foster on the Freeform drama series The Fosters, a role he reprised in the spinoff series, Good Trouble.

== Early life ==
Byerly was born on October 11, 2000, in Lakewood, Colorado. He grew up in Littleton, Colorado before eventually relocating with his family to Los Angeles, California at the age of ten to pursue an acting career. He first began to develop an interest in acting by imitating his favorite film and television characters and reciting their lines along with them. He has one younger brother.

== Career ==
Byerly began his acting career after winning first place in a national talent competition in Orlando, Florida. Shortly thereafter, he booked his very first audition, making his television debut in 2011 with a guest-starring role as Skunk, the scrappy leader of a misfit basketball team on the Disney XD comedy series Zeke and Luther. That same year, he made his feature film debut with a starring role as Nathan Vales in the supernatural horror film 11/11/11.

In 2012, Byerly began a recurring role on the NBC comedy-drama series Parenthood portraying Micah Watson, a boy with spina bifida who becomes the best friend of Max Braverman (portrayed by Max Burkholder). That same year, he transitioned to work as a voice actor, voicing various roles in the video games Call of Duty: Black Ops II and Lightning Returns: Final Fantasy XIII, as well as voicing the role of Prince Gustav on the Disney Channel animated series, Sofia the First.

In 2013, Byerly became one of the principal ensemble cast members on the ABC Family drama series The Fosters. On the series, Byerly portrays Jude Adams-Foster, an abused and sensitive 12-year-old foster child who is subsequently adopted into a large blended family where he begins questioning his sexuality and the nature of his feelings for his best friend Connor (portrayed by Gavin MacIntosh). In March 2014, Hollywood.com named Byerly's "heartwarming" portrayal of Jude to its list of "Favorite LGBTQ Characters on TV."

On March 2, 2015, ABC Family aired an episode of The Fosters ("Now Hear This") that featured Byerly's character and MacIntosh's character sharing a kiss, that is believed to be the youngest LGBT kiss ever in U.S. television history.

== Personal life ==
Byerly's personal interests include reading mysteries and action-adventure books and solving advanced math problems, as well as playing basketball and video games. Alongside his former Fosters co-star Gavin MacIntosh, Byerly has been an outspoken advocate against school bullying, encouraging young people to embrace their differences and lending his support to the "Be Good to Each Other" campaign.

== Filmography ==
=== Film ===
Year	Title	Role	Notes
2011	11/11/11	Nathan 'Nat' Vales	

=== Television ===
Year	Title	Role	Notes
2011	Zeke and Luther	Skunk Wetzel	Episode: "Luther Turns Four"
2012–2014	Parenthood	Micah Watson	5 episodes
2013	Sofia the First	Prince Gustav (voice)	Episode: "Just One of the Princes"
2013–2018	The Fosters	Jude Adams Foster	104 episodes
2019–2023	Good Trouble	Jude Adams Foster	6 episodes
2019	The 11th Commandment	Parker	

=== Video games ===
Year	Title	Voice role	Notes
2012	Call of Duty: Black Ops II	Young David Mason	
2013	Lightning Returns: Final Fantasy XIII	Additional Voices	English dub
2016	Lego Marvel's Avengers	Harley Keener	
