= Dances With Films =

American independent film festival

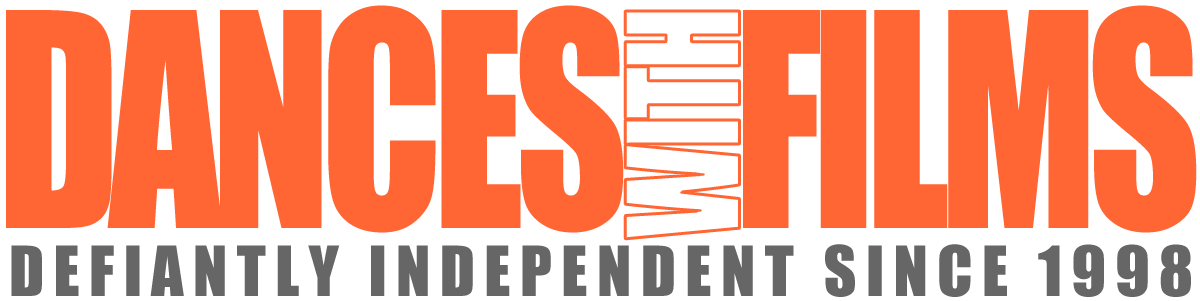
- Location: Los Angeles, California, U.S.
- Founded: 1998
- Most recent: 2025
- Festival date: Opening: 19 June 2025; Closing: 29 June 2025
- Language: English
- Website: danceswithfilms.com

Dances With Films (DWF) is an annual independent film festival in Los Angeles and New York. It was founded by Leslee Scallon and Michael Trent.

== Lineup ==
Taking place every year since 1998, the festival is dedicated to representing true independent cinema stipulating that all films entered into the festival competition have no known directors, writers or producers connected to them. Programs include a mix of feature-length films, shorts, documentaries and animations.

In 2022, Dances With Films held its inaugural New York festival, at the Regal Cinemas in Union Square.

In 2025, the festival celebrated its 28th annual film festival at the TCL Chinese Theater in Hollywood.

== Notable artists ==
Dances With Films alumni include Gina Rodriguez, Jesse Eisenberg, Bryan Cranston, Betsy Brandt, Ryan Eggold, Steven Kane, Mark V. Olsen, Will Scheffer, Dan Harris, John Putch, and Mike Flanagan, often in some of earliest appearances and works of their careers.
