= Annamarie Kenoyer =

American actress

- Born: July 2, 1994 (age 32)
- Other name: Anna Marie Kenoyer
- Occupation: Actress
- Years active: 2005–present

Annamarie Kenoyer (born July 2, 1994) is an American actress, who is known for appearing in several television shows and a few films. Her most noted role is as Ashley Whitaker in Medium.

== Career ==
Annamarie first appeared in 2005 in Amateur, as Jeffrey Christopher Todd's little sister. She then appeared on iCarly in 2007 as Shannon, the girl that Gibby likes but has a crush on Freddie. In 2009, she appeared in Southland as Kimmy Salinger.

Annamarie also portrayed Becca in The Fosters, who belongs to a group of foster girls who live in a home named Girls United.

In 2015, Kenoyer appeared as Ree in the feature film Lola's Last Letter, which world-premiered at the TCL Chinese Theatre in Hollywood as part of Dances with Films Festival competition lineup. The filmmakers collect and post hundreds of anonymous apology letters online and on social media, frequently posting stills from the film featuring Kenoyer's character.

== Filmography ==
=== Film ===
Year	Film	Role	Notes
2005	Amateur	Phoebe Kline	
2007	Star and Stella Save the World	Cindy	
2014	Sins of our Youth	Carly	
2015	Lola's Last Letter	Ree	

=== Television ===
Year	Title	Role	Notes
2006	ER	Ruthie Pooler	Episode: "No Place to Hide"
2007	Numbers	Junior High Kid	Episode: "Finders Keepers"
2007–2009	Medium	Ashley Whitaker	8 episodes
2008	iCarly	Shannon Mitchell	Episode: "iWin a Date"
2009	United States of Tara	Madison	Episode: "Aftermath"
2009–2010	Southland	Kimmy Salinger	5 episodes
2010	Lie to Me	Marly	Episode: "Delinquent"
2013	Zach Stone Is Gonna Be Famous	Jackie	Episode: "Zach Stone Is Gonna Be the Zachelor"
2014	Trophy Wife	Store Clerk	Episode: "Happy Bert Day"
2014–2015	The Fosters	Becka	7 episodes
2016	As the Ink Seeps	Christina	Short

=== Video games ===
Year	Title	Role	Notes
2011	L.A. Noire	Marianne Belle (voice)	
