= Danny Nucci =

American actor (born 1968)

- Born: September 15, 1968 (age 58); Klagenfurt, Carinthia, Austria
- Occupation: Actor
- Years active: 1984–present
- Spouses: Terre Bridgham (m. 1995; div. 1998) Paula Marshall (m. 2003)
- Children: 2

Danny Nucci (born September 15, 1968) is an American actor. He is best known for his supporting roles in blockbuster films, including his roles as Danny Rivetti in Crimson Tide (1995), Lieutenant Shepard in The Rock (1996), Deputy Monroe in Eraser (1996), and Fabrizio de Rossi in Titanic (1997), as well as his lead role as Mike Foster in the Freeform series The Fosters (2013–2018).

== Personal life ==
Danny Nucci was born on September 15, 1968, in Klagenfurt to a Jewish family. His family had emigrated from Morocco to Italy and then to Austria. His family then immigrated to New York City when he was still a child.

After temporarily living in Queens, the family settled in the San Fernando Valley, where Nucci graduated from Grant High School. He married Terre Bridgham in 1995, and they had a daughter before their divorce in 1998. He played lovers with Paula Marshall in the 1997 film That Old Feeling; they married in 2003, and have a daughter.

== Career ==
During the 1990s, Nucci played characters who are unceremoniously killed off in three blockbuster films—Eraser, The Rock and Titanic (as Fabrizio De Rossi, Jack Dawson's Italian friend)—which were released within 20 months of each other between 1996 and 1997. His character in Alive (also known as Alive: The Miracle of the Andes) (1993) survives.

Elsewhere in film, he starred as Spider Bomboni in Book of Love (1990) and as Petty Officer Danny Rivetti in the Gene Hackman-Denzel Washington thriller Crimson Tide (1995). He played the roles of Benny Rodriguez in the straight-to-video film The Sandlot: Heading Home (2007) and a Port Authority police officer in World Trade Center (2006).

Nucci appeared as Gabriel Ortega on the CBS soap opera Falcon Crest from 1988 to 1989, and as Vincent Sforza in the television miniseries Firestarter 2: Rekindled (2002). Other notable TV appearances include Growing Pains, Out of This World, Quantum Leap, Family Ties, The Twilight Zone, Tour of Duty, Snoops, Just Shoot Me, House, Without a Trace, Criminal Minds, The Mentalist, CSI: NY, three episodes of Castle and one episode of Arrow. Along with Ernie Hudson, he co-starred in the short-lived police drama series 10-8: Officers on Duty. He provided the voice of Alberto the Chihuahua in The Brave Little Toaster to the Rescue.

In 2010, he portrayed John Gotti in Sinatra Club, and Dante McDermott in the science-fiction film Nephilim. In 2011, he co-starred in the mystery thriller Escapee. Until 2018, Nucci played Mike Foster on the Freeform (formerly ABC Family) drama The Fosters.

Nucci portrayed Pop, the father of main character Felix Funicello, in the 2014 Lifetime television movie Wishin' and Hopin'.

== Filmography ==
=== Film ===
Year	Title	Role	Notes
1985	Explorers	Steve Jackson's Gang Member	
1985	American Drive-In	Tommy	
1986	Combat Academy	Jai	
1990	Book of Love	'Spider' Bomboni	
1992	Rescue Me	Todd	
1993	Alive	Hugo Díaz	
1993	Roosters	Hector Morales	
1995	Homage	Gilbert Tellez	
1995	Crimson Tide	Petty Officer First Class Danny Rivetti	
1995	In the Flesh	Rico Sanchez	
1996	The Rock	Lieutenant Shepard	
1996	Eraser	WitSec US Deputy Marshal Monroe	
1996	The Big Squeeze	Jesse Torrejo	
1997	Love Walked In	Cousin Matt	
1997	That Old Feeling	Joey Donna	
1997	Titanic	Fabrizio De Rossi	
1998	Sugar: The Fall of the West	Unknown	
1998	The Unknown Cyclist	Gaetano Amador	
1998	Sublet	Stuart Dempsey	
1999	The Outfitters	P.D. Mijants	
1999	The Brave Little Toaster to the Rescue	Alberto (voice)	
1999	Friends & Lovers	Dave	
1999	Tuesday's Letters	Unknown	
2000	Shark in a Bottle	Guy Normal	
2002	Do It for Uncle Manny	Oscar	
2003	American Cousins	Gino	
2004	One Last Ride	Benny	Uncredited
2005	Break A Leg	E.J. Inglewood	
2006	The Way Back Home	Paul Reeds	
2006	World Trade Center	Officer Giraldi	
2007	Totally Baked	Arturo Goldman (Segment "FunOnion Boardroom")	
2007	The Sandlot: Heading Home	Benny Rodriguez	Direct-to-video
2010	Sinatra Club	John Gotti	
2011	Escapee	Professor Jeremy Davis	
2014	Wishin' and Hopin'	Pa	
2015	Pizza with Bullets	Freddie 'The Cat' Pagano	

=== Television ===
Year	Title	Role	Notes
1984	Pryor's Place	Freddy	
1985	Hotel	Evan	Episode: "Wins and Losses"
1985	Family Ties	Rick	Episode: "Designated Hitter"
1985	Mr. Belvedere	Boy	Episode: "Pinball"
1985	The Twilight Zone	Buddy	Episode: "The Leprechaun-Artist/Dead Run"
1986	Our House	Unknown	Episode: "Choices"
1986	Growing Pains	'Scooter' Krassner	Episode: "Employee of the Month"
1986	The Children of Times Square	Luis Sotavento	TV movie
1986	The Brotherhood of Justice	Willie	TV movie
1987	CBS Schoolbreak Special	Scott Fischer	Episode: "An Enemy Among Us"
1988	Magnum, P.I.	Budge, Leader of The Biker Gang	Episode: "The Great Hawaiian Adventure Company"
1988	Home Free	Dennis Ferrand	TV movie
1988–1989	Falcon Crest	Gabriel Ortega	16 episodes
1989	A Brand New Life	Dominick, The DJ	Episode: "Private School"
1989	A Peaceable Kingdom	Eddie Morano	Episode: "Symphony"
1990	Tour of Duty	Private Wozniak	Episode: "Acceptable Losses"
1990	Equal Justice	Ramon Escobar	Episode: "Goodbye, Judge Green"
1990	Quantum Leap	Tony Pronti	Episode: "Leap of Faith – August 19, 1963"
1990	Ferris Bueller	Greg Knecht	Episode: "Baby You Can't Drive My Car"
1991	Out of This World	'Moose'	Episode: "Heck's Angels"
1992	Blossom	Lou	Episode: "Three O'Clock and All Is Hell"
1992	Dream On	Pizza Guy	Episode: "Red All Over"
1993	For the Love of My Child: The Anissa Ayala Story	Airon Ayala	TV movie
1993	A Matter of Justice	Private Vince Grella	TV movie
1994	Ray Alexander: A Taster for Justice	Paul Garcia	TV movie
1994	Blind Justice	Roberto	TV movie
1999–2000	Snoops	Emmanuel 'Manny' Lott	13 episodes
2001	Some of My Best Friends	Frankie Zito	8 episodes
2002	Firestarter 2: Rekindled	Vincent Sforza	TV movie
2002	Father Lefty	Father Robert 'Lefty' Lefrack	TV movie
2002–2003	Just Shoot Me!	Pete	2 episodes
2003	Mafia Doctor	Frank	TV movie
2003–2004	10-8: Officers on Duty	Deputy Rico Amonte	15 episodes
2004	Joey	Ron	Episode: "Joey and the Dream Girl: Part 2"
2005	House	Bill Arnello	Episode: "Mob Rules"
2008	Without a Trace	Scott Lucas	Episode: "4G"
2008	The Mentalist	Ben Machado	Episode: "Flame Red"
2008	Criminal Minds	Burke Manning	Episode: "Normal"
2008	Backwoods	Perry Walters	TV movie
2009–2014	Castle	Gilbert Mazzara / Lance	3 episodes
2010	CSI: NY	Officer Nicholas Henderson	Episode: "Vacation Getaway"
2011	CSI: Crime Scene Investigation	Detective Daniel Sosa	Episode: "Cello and Goodbye"
2011	NCIS: Los Angeles	CIA Agent Figg	Episode: "Sacrifice"
2012	CSI: Miami	Will Kingsley	Episode: "No Good Deed"
2012	The Booth at the End	Henry	5 episodes
2012	NCIS	Gordon Fremont	Episode: "Devil's Trifecta"
2013	Arrow	Fire Chief Raynes	Episode: "Burned"
2013–2018	The Fosters	Mike Foster	Main Cast, 87 episodes
2018	The Rookie	Detective Sanford Motta	2 episodes
2019–2021	I Think You Should Leave with Tim Robinson	Hal	1 episode
2019–2024	9-1-1	Detective Rick Romero	8 episodes
2020	Party of Five	Uncle Louis	1 episode
2022	The Offer	Mario Biaggi	Miniseries
