= Alicia Sixtos =

American actress

- Born: Alicia Marie Sixtos; May 27, 1988 (age 38); San Francisco, California
- Occupation: Actress
- Years active: 2006–present
- Spouse: Bex Taylor-Klaus (m. 2020)

Alicia Marie Sixtos (born May 27, 1988) is an American actress. She is best known for her role as Maya Martinez in the Hulu series East Los High and her recurring role as Carmen Cruz in the ABC Family's series The Fosters.

== Early years ==
Sixtos was born and raised in San Francisco and has three sisters. She is of Mexican and Portuguese descent. She moved to Los Angeles in 2005, and began work as a model for ad agencies.

== Career ==
Sixtos has done many roles in many television series and movies including The Avengers, King of the Hill, Californication, CSI: Crime Scene Investigation, and General Hospital. In 2006, she had the lead role in the drama film Quinceañera. In 2014, she would portray the role of Carmen on the show The Fosters.

== Personal life ==
On October 11, 2018, Sixtos came out on Twitter as pansexual for National Coming Out Day. She and actor Bex Taylor-Klaus married in October 2020.

== Filmography ==
Film
Year	Title	Role	Notes
2006	Quinceañera	Eileen May Garcia	
2007	Shelter	Amber	
2010	High School	Sharky Ovante	
2011	The Custom Mary	Mary	
2012	The Avengers	Carrier BridgeTechs	

Television
Year	Title	Role	Notes
2007	CSI: Crime Scene Investigation	Simone Molinez	Episode: "Big Shots"
2007	Lincoln Heights	Party Girl	Episode: "Grown Folks' Business"
2007	Californication	Girl with Carjacker	Episode: "Filthy Lucre"
2008	King of the Hill	Inez	Episode: "Lady and Gentrification"
2009	Entourage	Betty	Episode: "One Car, Two Car, Red Car, Blue Car"
2010	General Hospital	April	Episode #1.12173
2011	90210	Waitress	Episode: "The Enchanted Donkey"
2012	New Girl	Tiffany	Episode: "Bathtub"
2013–2017	East Los High	Maya Martinez	46 episodes
2014	The Fosters	Carmen	7 episodes
2019	Harry Bosch	Officier Rene Davila	season 5 episode 6
