= Sherri Saum =

American actress (born 1974)

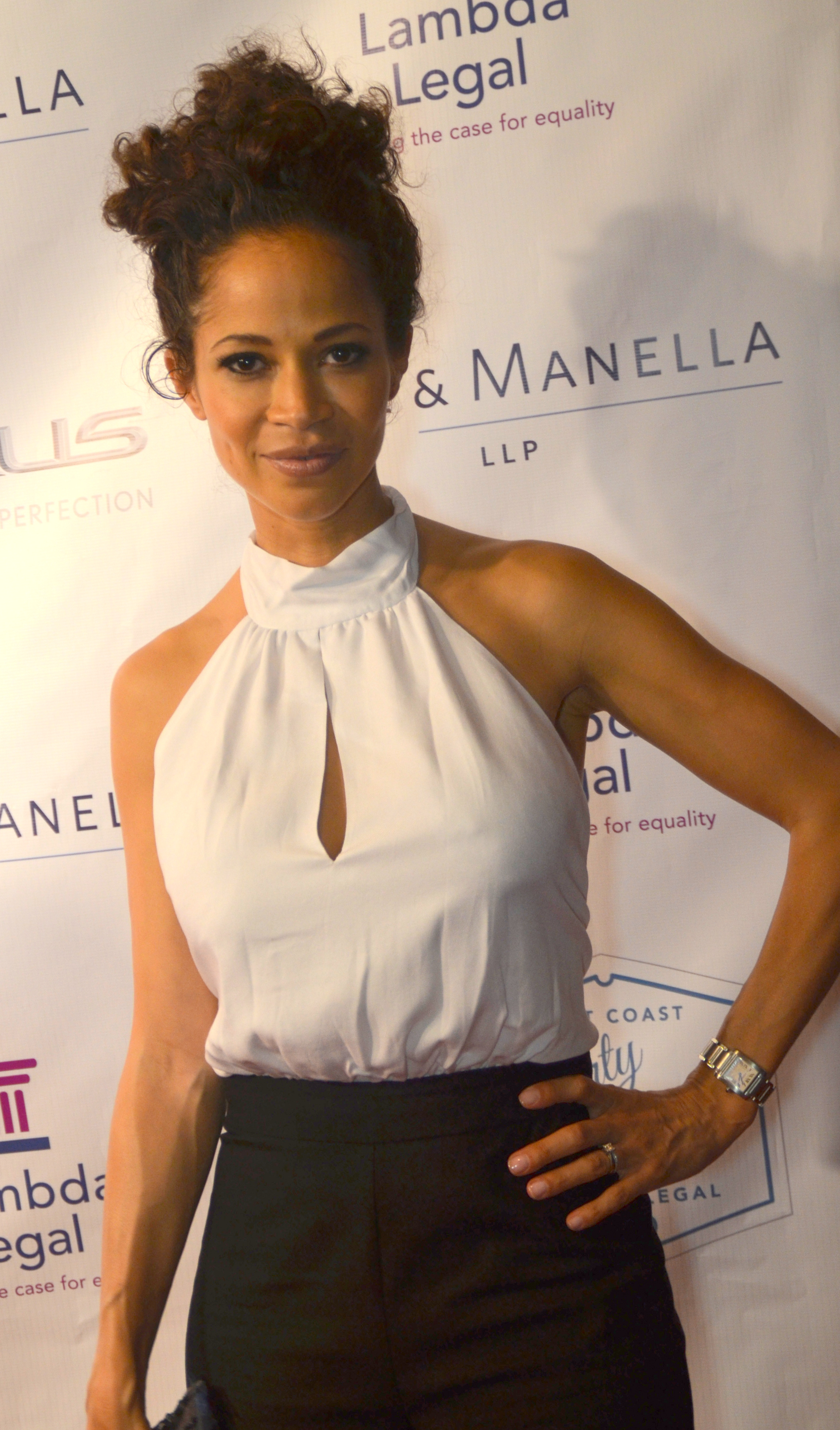
- Saum in 2014
- Born: October 1, 1974 (age 52); Dayton, Ohio, U.S.
- Education: Ohio State University; New York University
- Occupation: Actress
- Years active: 1997–present
- Spouse: Kamar de los Reyes (m. 2007; died 2023)
- Children: 2

Sherri Saum (born October 1, 1974) is an American actress. Saum is best known for her co-lead role as Lena Adams Foster in the Freeform drama series The Fosters (2013–2018) as well as a subsequent guest star role in its spinoff Good Trouble (2019–2024). She is also known for her television roles in Beggars and Choosers, Rescue Me, In Treatment and Locke & Key, as well as for her roles in the daytime soap operas Sunset Beach and One Life to Live.

== Early life ==
Saum was born in Dayton, Ohio, to a German mother and an African-American father. She got her start at a Model Search America convention near her home in Kettering, Ohio. She was discovered during high school, modeling mostly during summer breaks until she moved to New York to work full-time with the NY modeling agency Images Management. Saum attended Ohio State University in Columbus, and New York University in New York.

== Career ==
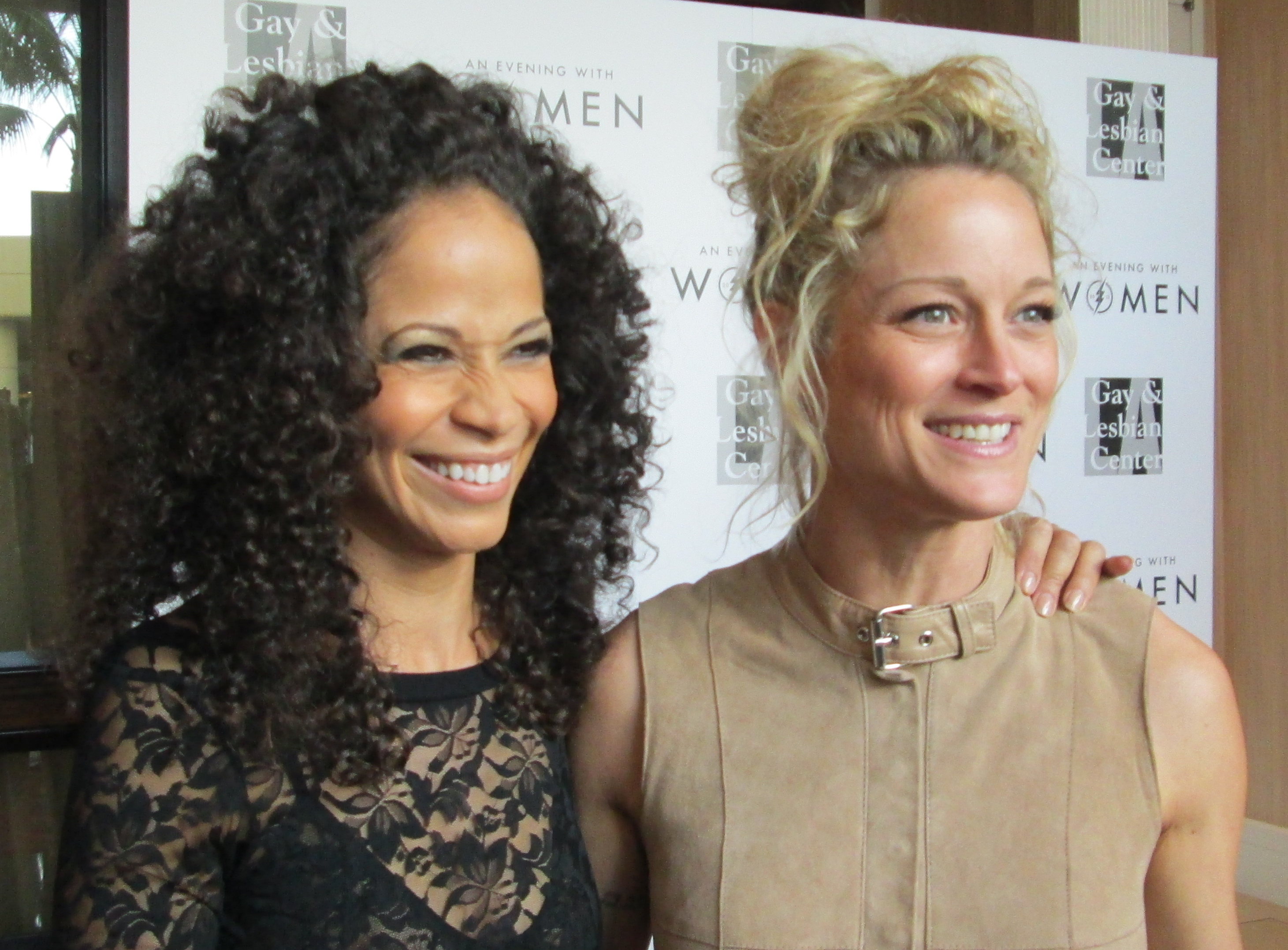
Saum (left) with Teri Polo in 2013

Saum began her acting career in the NBC daytime soap opera, Sunset Beach as Vanessa Hart, during the entire run of the series, from 1997 to 1999. In 1999, she received a Daytime Emmy Award nomination for Outstanding Younger Actress in a Drama Series for her role in the show. Later in 1999, Saum was cast as a series regular in the Showtime comedy-drama series Beggars and Choosers (1999–2000), and guest-starred on Girlfriends, and Charmed. From August 31, 2001, to September 16, 2003, Saum had her second daytime television role in the ABC soap, One Life to Live, as Keri Reynolds.

From 2006 to 2007, Saum played the role of Natalie in the FX drama series Rescue Me. She appeared in the Hallmark Television film Relative Stranger with Cicely Tyson and Eriq La Salle. She also appeared in the independent film Ten Stories Tall with Ally Sheedy and Josh Hamilton. In 2009, she played the series regular role of Bess in season 2 of the HBO drama series In Treatment. The next few years she had guest-starring roles in CW's Gossip Girl, CBS's Unforgettable, ABC's Body of Proof and Revenge. In 2011, Saum was cast as the lead character of the ABC drama pilot Grace (written by Krista Vernoff), opposite Abigail Spencer and Eric Roberts, but the show was not picked up.

In 2012, Saum was cast along with Teri Polo in the lead roles of the Jennifer Lopez-produced drama series The Fosters for ABC Family. The series premiered on June 3, 2013. The series ended in 2018 after five seasons. She reprised her role in its spinoff, Good Trouble in 2019. While on hiatus from The Fosters, she took various guest starring roles in network dramas. In 2014, she guest starred in the NBC legal drama Law & Order: Special Victims Unit, where her real-life pregnancy was incorporated into the plot. In 2015, she guested in the ABC series, How to Get Away with Murder and The Mysteries of Laura. In 2016 she guested on Code Black on CBS and in 2018 on the TNT adventure series The Librarians. After The Fosters ended, Sherri played the adult Regina Louise in the biographical feature I Am Somebody's Child: The Regina Louise Story and joined the ABC Marvel sci-fi series Agents of S.H.I.E.L.D. for three episodes.

In 2019, Saum co-starred opposite Jessica Biel in the Facebook Watch drama series Limetown. Earlier that year, she was cast as Heather Hemmens' character's mother Mimi DeLuca in the CW series, Roswell, New Mexico. In early 2019, Saum was cast in a series recurring role in the Netflix fantasy drama series, Locke & Key playing the role of Ellie Whedon, a teacher at Matheson Academy who has a mysterious history with the Locke family. Filming in Toronto and Lunenburg, Canada, through the spring and summer of 2019, she split her time, flying home to her family in Los Angeles frequently. Later in 2019, she returned to Toronto for two episodes of the Starz thriller Condor as Senator Thrush. Seasons 2 & 3 of Locke & Key filmed consecutively and because of COVID-19 pandemic restrictions, Sherri spent several months in 2021 in Canada filming her season 2 (recurring) and season 3 (series regular) episodes. That year she also returned to Good Trouble and guested as Paula Matarazzo in the Starz franchise Power Book II: Ghost. In March 2022 Sherri returned to Law & Order: Special Victims Unit in a different role than she had played almost exactly 8 years earlier. The same week she appeared again as Lena Adams Foster on Good Trouble.

== Personal life ==
On May 19, 2007, Saum married longtime boyfriend and former One Life to Live castmate Kamar de los Reyes in New York City. On December 3, 2013, Saum's rep announced that the couple was expecting twins; the children were born in 2014. In addition, Saum is the stepmother of de los Reyes’ son. The couple were married until de los Reyes' death from cancer on December 24, 2023.

== Filmography ==
=== Film ===
Year	Title	Role	Notes
2003	Anne B. Real	Janet Gimenez	
2003	Finding Home	Candace	
2005	Love and Suicide	Georgina	
2010	Ten Stories Tall	Susan	
2018	Deadly Scholars a.k.a #SquadGoals	Jane Pope	

=== Television ===
Year	Title	Role	Notes
1997–1999	Sunset Beach	Vanessa Hart	Series regular Nominated – Daytime Emmy Award for Outstanding Younger Actress in a Drama Series (1999)
1999–2001	Beggars and Choosers	Casey Lennox	Series regular
2000	Girlfriends	Angela Anderson	Episode: "The Importance of Being Frank"
2001	Charmed	Ariel	Episode: "Pre-Witched"
2001–2003	One Life to Live	Keri Reynolds	Series regular Nominated – Daytime Emmy Award for America's Favorite Couple (2002)
2005	Law & Order: Trial by Jury	Tiffany Jackson	Episode: "Pattern of Conduct"
2006	Love Monkey	Daria	Episode: "Nice Package"
2006	Law & Order: Criminal Intent	Lydia Wyatt	Episode: "The Healer"
2006	Drift	Luna	Unsold TV pilot
2006–2007	Rescue Me	Natalie	Recurring role
2007	Army Wives	Vanessa Kelsing	Episode: "Only the Lonely"
2009	In Treatment	Bess	Main role (season 2)
2009	CSI: Miami	Karen Ballard	Episode: "Point of Impact"
2009	Relative Stranger	Nicole Tate	Television film
2009–2010	Gossip Girl	Holland Kemble	4 episodes
2010	Heroes	Kate Bennet	Episode: "The Wall"
2010	Memphis Beat	Melinda Connor	Episode: "One Night of Sin"
2010	Lie to Me	Candice McCallister	Episode: "The Royal We"
2011	Grace	Shay Grace Davis	Unsold TV pilot
2011	The Whole Truth	Dr. Christy Turner	Episode: "Lost in Translation"
2011	Body of Proof	Nina Wheeler	Episode: "Letting Go"
2011	Unforgettable	Rosario Sanchez	Episode: "Road Block"
2012	CSI: NY	Elaine Moore	Episode: "Unwrapped"
2013	Revenge	Donna Carlisle	Episode: "Collusion"
2013–2018	The Fosters	Lena Adams Foster	Main role
2014	Law & Order: Special Victims Unit	Sondra Vaughn	Episode: "Gambler's Fallacy"
2015	How to Get Away with Murder	Tanya Randolph	Episode: "It's Called the Octopus"
2015	The Mysteries of Laura	Cecilia Burke	Episode: "The Mystery of the Dead Heat"
2016	Code Black	Shawna Jacobson	Episode: "Corporeal Form"
2018	The Librarians	Karla	Episode: "And the Hidden Sanctuary"
2019–2024	Good Trouble	Lena Adams Foster	Recurring role, 10 episodes; Director: "With a Little Help From My Friends"
2019–2022	Roswell, New Mexico	Mimi DeLuca	Recurring role
2019	Agents of S.H.I.E.L.D.	Altarah	3 episodes
2019	Limetown	Gina Purri	Recurring role, 8 episodes
2019	I Am Somebody's Child: The Regina Louise Story	Adult Regina Louise	Television film
2020–2022	Locke & Key	Ellie Whedon	Recurring role (seasons 1–2); main role (season 3)
2020–2021	Grey's Anatomy	Allison Robin Brown	2 episodes
2020	Condor	Senator Thrush	2 episodes
2020–2022	Power Book II: Ghost	Paula Matarazzo	Recurring role
2022	Law & Order: Special Victims Unit	Cressida "Cress" Gordon	Episode: "Sorry If It Got Weird For You"
2022	CSI: Vegas	Jodi Wallach	3 episodes
2022	Perfect Harmony	Barrett Woodward	Television film
2023	Mrs. Davis	Danni	2 episodes
2024	Dead Boy Detectives	Maddy	2 episodes
2025	Law & Order	Andrea Morgan	Episode: "Greater Good”
2025	Forever	Aunt DeeDee	Episode: "The Vineyard”
2026	Imperfect Women	Zoe	2 episodes
