= David Lambert (actor) =

American actor (born 1993)

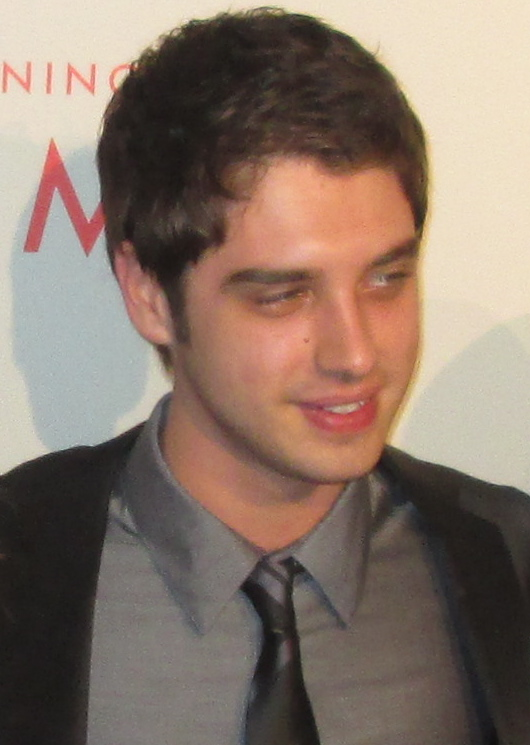
- Lambert in 2014
- Born: November 29, 1993 (age 32); Baton Rouge, Louisiana, U.S.
- Occupation: Actor
- Years active: 2006–present

David Lambert (born November 29, 1993) is an American actor. He is best known for playing Brandon Foster on the Freeform original series The Fosters.

== Early life ==
David Lambert was born in Baton Rouge, Louisiana. His mother is Puerto Rican, while his father is from the mainland United States. He was home-schooled. He has lived in England, Texas, and Taiwan but has been living in Georgia for many years.

Lambert can play the piano and trumpet, and is learning the electric guitar. He also has a tenor singing voice.

Lambert has been doing theater for many years, beginning when he was cast in the play the Wizard of Oz at age 3. His theatrical roles include Mr. Tumnus in The Chronicles of Narnia: The Lion, the Witch, and the Wardrobe, Mr. Mayor in Seussical, Carisford in Little Princess, and Phao in The Jungle Book. He played J.J. for one episode of Psych. He also starred as Jaylen in the television show Tyler Perry's House of Payne.

== Career ==
Lambert was discovered at an open casting call by agent Joy Pervis in Atlanta. After performing his monologue, he was asked to do something else. At first thought, he recited the Pledge of Allegiance, and it worked. He was in Georgia when he got the call to pack for Canada, where Aaron Stone was filmed.

From 2009 to 2010 Lambert starred as Jason Landers, Charlie Landers/Aaron Stone's brother, in Aaron Stone, and Goose in the Disney Channel original movie Den Brother, also starring Hutch Dano. Lambert starred in the Hallmark Hall of Fame movie A Smile as Big as the Moon, which aired on January 29, 2012.

Lambert starred in The Lifeguard, which competed at the 2013 Sundance Film Festival for Best Dramatic Film. He plays the love interest of the character played by Kristen Bell, his co-star in the film.

Lambert played a leading role on the Freeform original series, The Fosters. He played Brandon Foster, a talented, 16-year-old pianist who is the biological son of cop Stef Adams Foster.

== Personal life ==
Lambert is of Irish, English, German, French and Puerto Rican descent. His mother has stated that his birth year as reported on most websites (1992) is incorrect, and that Lambert was born on November 29, 1993.

== Filmography ==
Films and television films
Year	Title	Role	Notes
2010	Den Brother	Danny "Goose" Gustavo	Television film
2012	A Smile as Big as the Moon	Steve	Television film
2013	The Lifeguard	Jason	
2024	Snow Valley	Brannon	
2026	Original Sound	Danny Solis	

Television shows and appearances
Year	Title	Role	Notes
2007	House of Payne	Jalen	"Paternity and Fraternity: Part 1" (Season 2, Episode 15)
2008	Psych	JJ	"The Old and the Restless" (Season 2, Episode 12)
2008	Pretty/Handsome	Bob Fitzpayne (Young)	Unsold Pilot
2010	Sons of Tucson	Quan	"Glenn's Birthday" (Season 1, Episode 11)
2009–2010	Aaron Stone	Jason Landers	Main role
2012	Longmire	Jake Lennox	"Unfinished Business" (Season 1, Episode 10)
2013–2018	The Fosters	Brandon Foster	Main role
2019–2024	Good Trouble	Brandon Foster	Guest role

== Awards ==
Year	Award	Category	Nominated work	Result
2014	Teen Choice Awards	Choice summer TV Star: Male	The Fosters	Nominated
