= Gavin MacIntosh =

American actor (born 1999)

- Born: March 22, 1999 (age 27); Tucson, Arizona, U.S.
- Occupations: Actor, model
- Years active: 2010–present

Gavin MacIntosh (born March 22, 1999) is an American actor. Beginning his professional career as a child actor and model at the age of ten, MacIntosh is best known for his recurring role as Connor Stevens on the ABC Family drama series The Fosters.

== Early life ==
MacIntosh was born on March 22, 1999 in Tucson, Arizona. He grew up in Tucson before eventually relocating with his family to Hermosa Beach, California. He attended Mira Costa High School in Manhattan Beach, graduating in 2016. He has two younger brothers, Grant and Gage MacIntosh.

== Career ==
In 2010, MacIntosh began his acting career with a starring role in the dramatic short film Turns. Additional short film roles include appearances as Young Martin Thomas in The Science of Death, and as Young Jonathan in Breathe. In 2011, he made his feature film debut alongside his brother Gage, appearing as brothers Mark and Nick Paterson respectively in the martial arts themed drama Blood Games: Sanctioned to Die.

In 2011, MacIntosh made his television debut with a guest-starring role as a member of Ron's scout troop on the NBC comedy series Parks and Recreation. Additional television roles include guest-starring appearances as Burt's 13-year-old brother Bruce in a 1981 flashback on the Fox comedy series Raising Hope, and as Young Brad in the pilot episode of the proposed science-fiction drama series H.O.P.E.

In 2013, MacIntosh began a recurring role on the ABC Family drama series The Fosters. On the series, MacIntosh portrays fan favorite Connor, a handsome and kind-hearted boy who develops feelings for the shy and isolated foster child Jude Adams Foster (portrayed by Hayden Byerly), prompting the 13-year-old Jude to come out as gay. Later Connor comes out, and the two begin a relationship that lasts until he moves to California to live with his mother.

In addition to his film and episodic television credits, MacIntosh has appeared in various national commercials, including television campaigns for Goodyear Tires, Oscar Mayer Lunchables, Pizza Hut, Lowe's, and Honda. As a Ford child and teen model, he has appeared in print, including commercial and editorial campaigns for Mattel, Target, Gap, Porsche, Hang Ten, and Tom Tailor, among others.

On March 2, 2015, ABC Family aired an episode of The Fosters, "Now Hear This", that featured MacIntosh's character and Byerly's character sharing a kiss, that is believed to be the youngest LGBT kiss ever in U.S. television history. In two tweets on March 29, 2015, MacIntosh took issue with YouTube's decision to add an age restriction for access to video of his character's kiss scene with Byerly's character, prompting a vocal social media campaign, and YouTube removed the age restriction less than a day later.

The Fosters TV's Youngest Same-Sex Kiss scene was featured as #9 in The 19 Biggest LGBT Moments On TV In 2015. MacIntosh and Byerly's kiss was also listed in the 7 Best Moments From ABC Family The Wrap Rewind 2015.

On December 23, 2015, MacIntosh was featured in the publication OUT Magazine discussing his famous gay kiss.

== Personal life ==
MacIntosh's personal interests include skateboarding, biking, and competitive soccer, as well as sketching, painting, and songwriting. MacIntosh is an outspoken straight ally for LGBT rights and equality. In addition, alongside his Fosters co-star Hayden Byerly, he is an advocate against bullying, encouraging youngsters to embrace their differences and lending his support to the "Be Good to Each Other" campaign.

== Filmography ==
Film
| Year | Film | Role | Notes |
|---|---|---|---|
| 2010 | Turns | (Unknown) | Short |
| 2011 | The Science of Death | Young Martin Thomas | Short |
| 2011 | Soulman: The Movie | Bobby | Short |
| 2011 | Sweet Dreams | Jake | Short |
| 2011 | Blood Games: Sanctioned to Die | Mark Paterson | Feature |
| 2011 | The Bluewater Tale | Alex | Short |
| 2011 | The Art of Paying Rent | Jake McCormick | Short |
| 2011 | Breathe | Young Jonathan | Short |
| 2012 | Knocked Down | Young Donny | Short |
| 2016 | American Fable | Martin | Feature |
Television
| Year | Program | Role | Notes |
| 2011 | Parks and Recreation | Wayne | Episode: "Pawnee Rangers" |
| 2011 | Raising Hope | Thirteen-Year-Old Bruce | Episode: "Burt's Parents" |
| 2012 | H.O.P.E. | Young Brad | Episode: "Life Alone" (Pilot) |
| 2013–2016 | The Fosters | Connor Stevens | Recurring role, 25 episodes |
| 2015–2017 | Bones | Parker Booth | 2 episodes |
| 2021 | Good Trouble | Connor Stevens | Guest appearance, 1 episode |
