= Teen Choice Award for Choice Summer TV Star: Female =

Entertainment award category

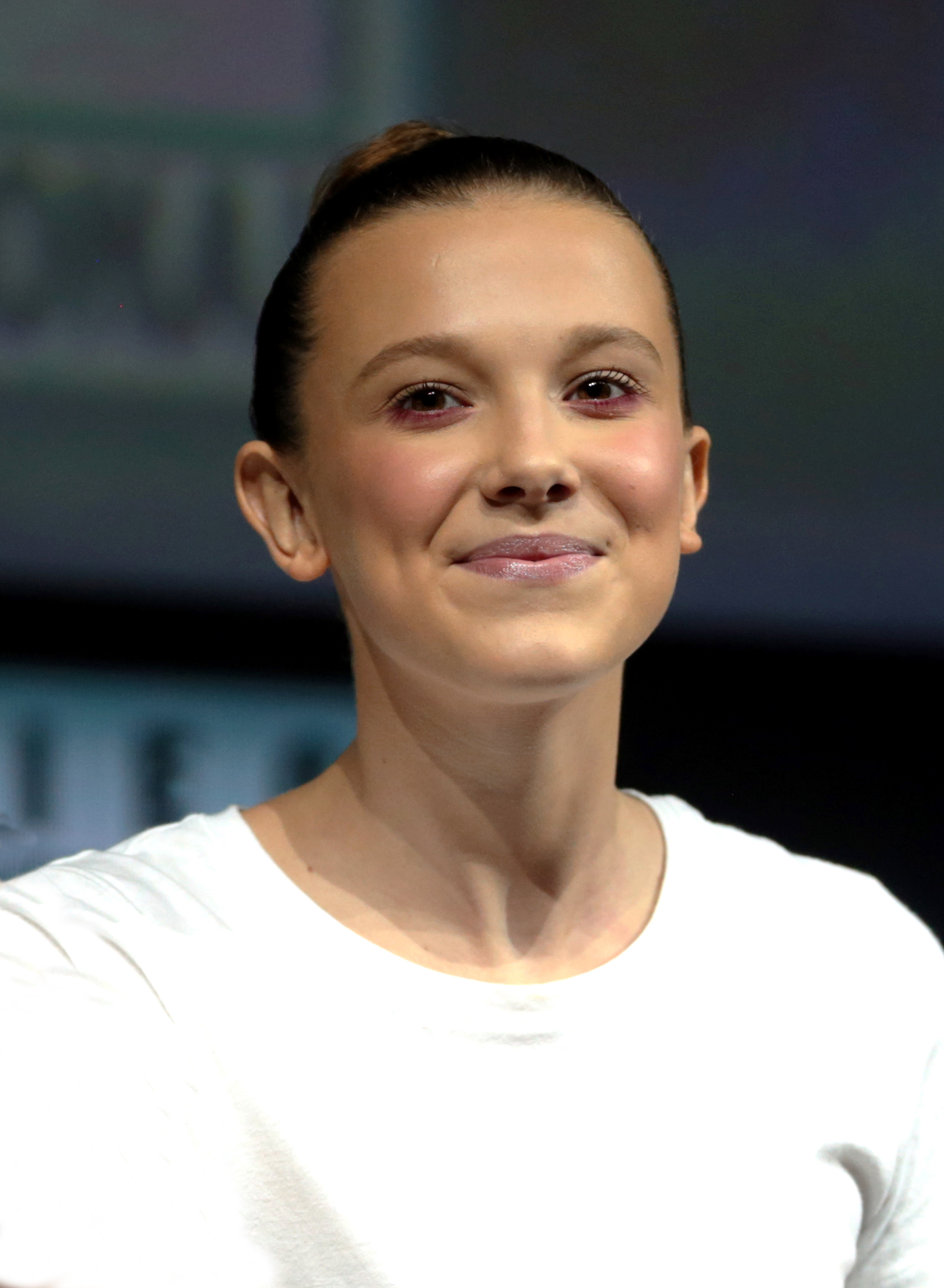
- 2019 winner Millie Bobby Brown
- Country: United States
- First award: 2009
- Final award: 2019
- Currently held by: Millie Bobby Brown for Stranger Things (2019)

Highlights
- Most wins: Lucy Hale (3)
- Most nominations: Lucy Hale (4)
- Website: http://www.teenchoice.com/

The following is a list of Teen Choice Award winners and nominees for Choice Summer TV Star: Female. The category was first introduced in 2009 with Selena Gomez being the inaugural winner.

Choice Summer TV Star: Female has been won by Lucy Hale the most times, with three wins and have received the most nominations, with four.

In 2018, the award was introduced as Choice Summer TV Star with the nominees, Male and Females being in the same category.

The current winner as Choice Summer TV Star: Female is Millie Bobby Brown for Stranger Things (2019).

== Winners and nominees ==
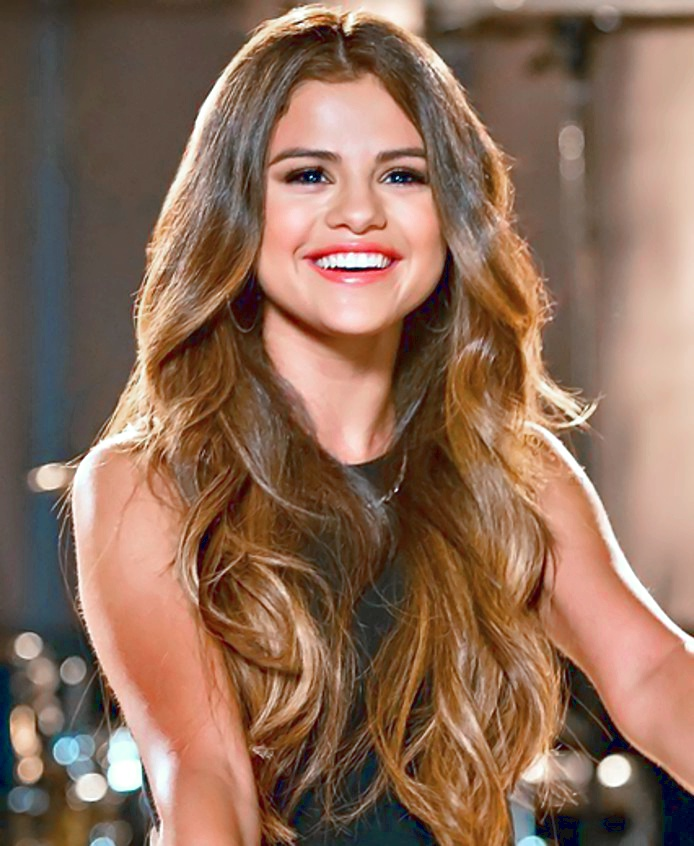
Selena Gomez was the first recipient of the award in 2009 for her roles in the TV Movie Princess Protection Program and the TV Series Wizards of Waverly Place.

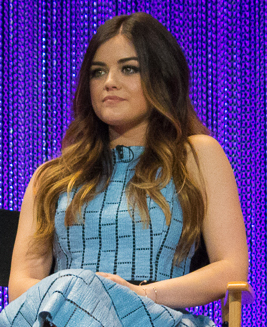
Three-time winner Lucy Hale, star of Pretty Little Liars. She is the actress with most wins in this category and most nominations with four.

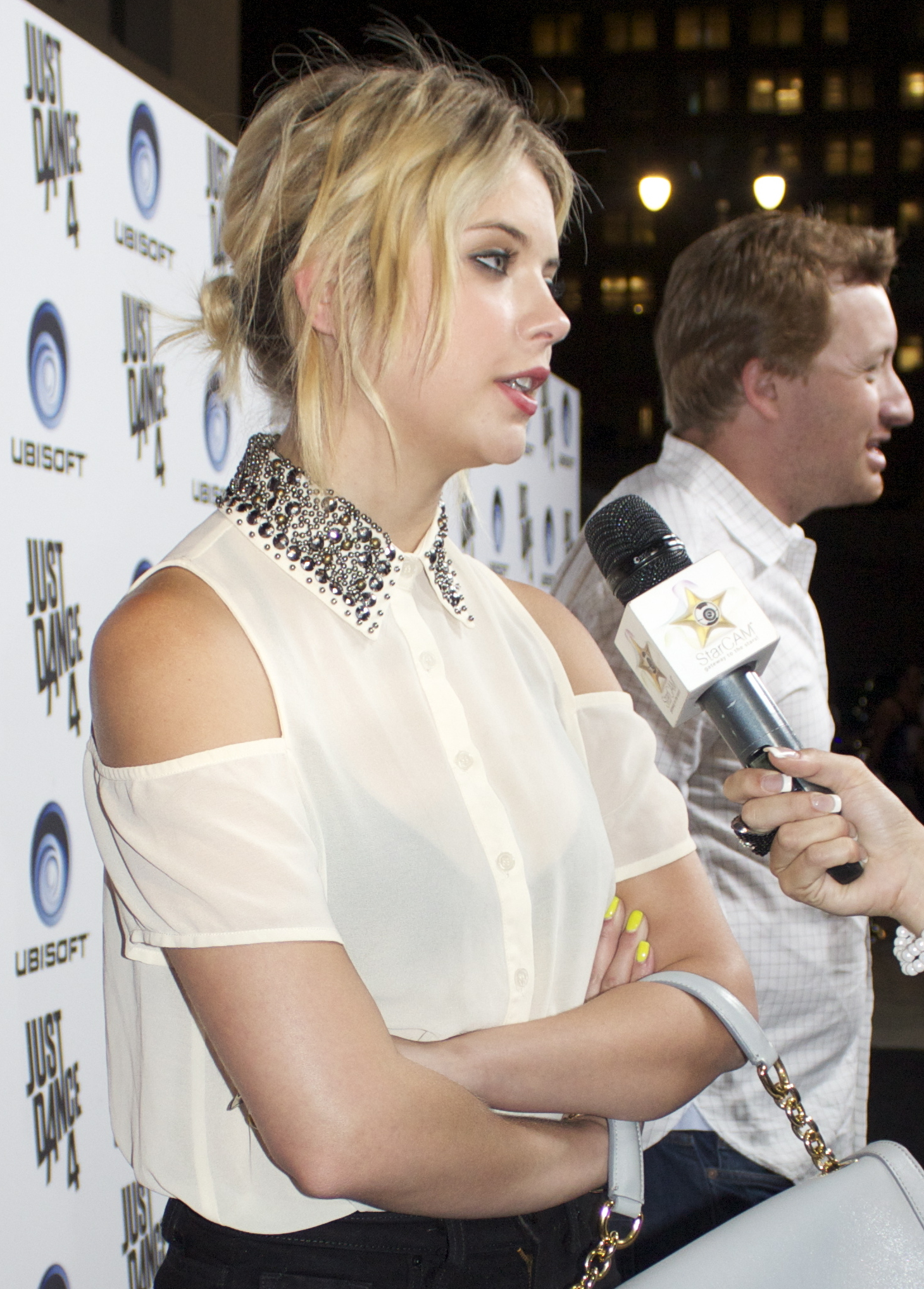
Two-time winner Ashley Benson, star of Pretty Little Liars.

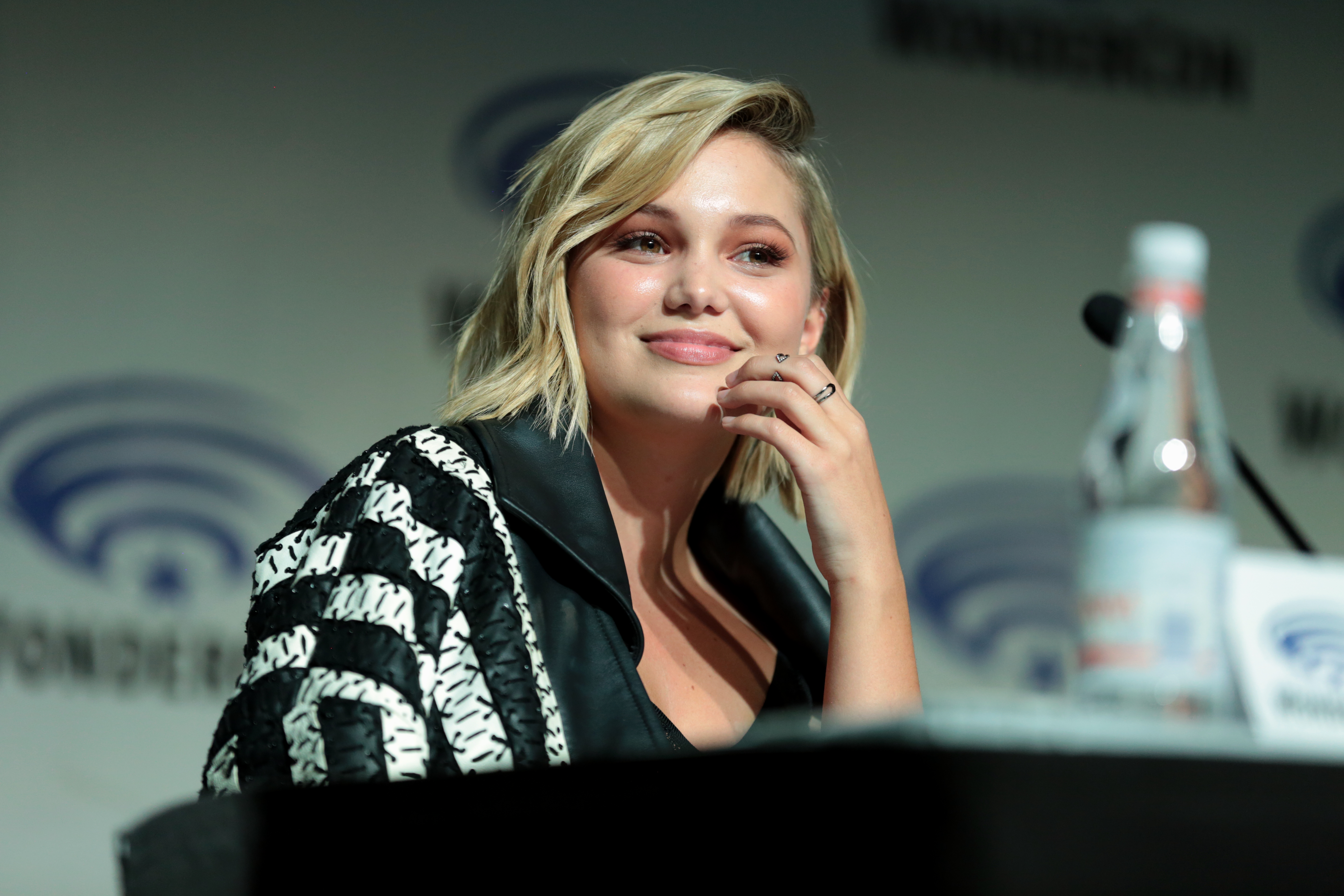
2018 winner Olivia Holt, star of Cloak & Dagger, awarded as "Choice Summer TV Star".

=== 2000s ===
Year	Winner	Nominees	Ref.
2009	Selena Gomez – Princess Protection Program and Wizards of Waverly Place	Paris Hilton – Paris Hilton's My New BFF; Demi Lovato – Princess Protection Program; Anna Paquin – True Blood; Shailene Woodley – The Secret Life of the American Teenager	

=== 2010s ===
Year	Winner	Nominees	Ref.
2010	Lucy Hale – Pretty Little Liars	Nikki Blonsky – Huge; Josie Loren – Make It or Break It; Anna Paquin – True Blood; Shailene Woodley – The Secret Life of the American Teenager	
2011	Lucy Hale – Pretty Little Liars	Troian Bellisario – Pretty Little Liars; Vanessa Marano – Switched at Birth; Raven-Symoné – State of Georgia; Crystal Reed – Teen Wolf	
2012	Troian Bellisario – Pretty Little Liars	Chelsea Kane – Baby Daddy; Crystal Reed – Teen Wolf; Ashley Rickards – Awkward.; Shailene Woodley – The Secret Life of the American Teenager	
2013	Lucy Hale – Pretty Little Liars	Maddie Hasson – Twisted; Chelsea Kane – Baby Daddy; Katie Leclerc – Switched at Birth; Maia Mitchell – The Fosters	
2014	Ashley Benson – Pretty Little Liars	Shay Mitchell – Pretty Little Liars; Emily Osment – Young & Hungry; Cierra Ramirez – The Fosters; Italia Ricci – Chasing Life	
2015	Ashley Benson – Pretty Little Liars	Troian Bellisario – Pretty Little Liars; Willa Fitzgerald – Scream; Laura Marano – Austin & Ally; Maia Mitchell – Teen Beach 2; Italia Ricci – Chasing Life	
2016	Shelley Hennig – Teen Wolf	Rowan Blanchard – Girl Meets World; Lucy Hale – Pretty Little Liars; Shay Mitchell – Pretty Little Liars; Emily Osment – Young & Hungry; Cierra Ramirez – The Fosters	
2017	Holland Roden – Teen Wolf	Aisha Dee – The Bold Type; Hilary Duff – Younger; Shelley Hennig – Teen Wolf; Maia Mitchell – The Fosters; Cierra Ramirez – The Fosters	
2018	Awarded as Choice Summer TV Star° Olivia Holt – Cloak & Dagger as Tandy Bowen / Dagger	Female Nominees: Aisha Dee – The Bold Type as Kat Edison; Meghann Fahy – The Bold Type as Sutton Brady; Katie Stevens – The Bold Type as Jane Sloan; Male Nominees: Aubrey Joseph – Cloak & Dagger as Tyrone Johnson / Cloak; Xolo Maridueña – Cobra Kai as Miguel Diaz	
2019	Millie Bobby Brown – Stranger Things as Eleven / Jane Hopper	Chloe Bennet – Agents of S.H.I.E.L.D. as Daisy "Skye" Johnson / Quake; Hilary Duff – Younger as Kelsey Peters; Jessica Marie Garcia – On My Block as Jasmine Flores; Rose McIver – iZombie as Olivia "Liv" Moore; Yara Shahidi – Grown-ish as Zoey Johnson	

== Multiple wins ==
The following individuals received two or more Choice Summer TV Star: Female awards:

3 wins

- Lucy Hale

2 wins

- Ashley Benson

== Multiple nominations ==
The following individuals received two or more Choice Summer TV Star: Female nominations:

4 nominations

- Lucy Hale

3 nominations

- Cierra Ramirez
- Maia Mitchell
- Shailene Woodley
- Troian Bellisario

2 nominations

- Ashley Benson
- Aisha Dee
- Anna Paquin
- Chelsea Kane
- Crystal Reed
- Emily Osment
- Hilary Duff
- Italia Ricci
- Shay Mitchell
- Shelley Hennig
