= List of The Fosters episodes =

The Fosters is an American drama series which aired on Freeform (formerly ABC Family) from June 3, 2013, to June 6, 2018.

A total of 104 episodes were broadcast over five seasons.

== Series overview ==
Series overview
Season	Episodes		Originally released		
Season	Episodes		First released	Last released	Network
1	21		June 3, 2013	March 24, 2014	ABC Family
2	21		June 16, 2014	March 23, 2015	ABC Family
3	20	10	June 8, 2015	August 17, 2015	ABC Family
3	20	10	January 25, 2016	March 28, 2016	Freeform
4	20		June 20, 2016	April 11, 2017	Freeform
5	22		July 11, 2017	June 6, 2018	Freeform

== Episodes ==
=== Season 1 (2013–14) ===
No. overall	No. in season	Title	Directed by	Written by	Original release date	US viewers (millions)
1	1	"Pilot"	Timothy Busfield	Bradley Bredeweg & Peter Paige	June 3, 2013	1.42
2	2	"Consequently"	Timothy Busfield	Bradley Bredeweg & Peter Paige	June 10, 2013	1.70
3	3	"Hostile Acts"	Melanie Mayron	David Ehrman	June 17, 2013	1.25
4	4	"Quinceañera"	Joanna Kerns	Joanna Johnson	June 24, 2013	1.89
5	5	"The Morning After"	Bethany Rooney	Paul Sciarrotta	July 1, 2013	1.78
6	6	"Saturday"	Norman Buckley	Marissa Jo Cerar	July 8, 2013	1.77
7	7	"The Fallout"	Jeff Melman	Story by : Zoila Amelia Galeano; Teleplay by : Bradley Bredeweg & Peter Paige	July 15, 2013	1.79
8	8	"Clean"	Millicent Shelton	Story by : David Ehrman & Paul Sciarrotta; Teleplay by : David Ehrman	July 22, 2013	1.89
9	9	"Vigil"	David Paymer	Joanna Johnson	July 29, 2013	1.87
10	10	"I Do"	James Hayman	Bradley Bredeweg & Peter Paige	August 5, 2013	2.07
11	11	"The Honeymoon"	James Hayman	Bradley Bredeweg & Peter Paige	January 13, 2014	1.92
12	12	"House and Home"	Martha Mitchell	Joanna Johnson	January 20, 2014	2.14
13	13	"Things Unsaid"	Joanna Kerns	Marissa Jo Cerar	January 27, 2014	1.88
14	14	"Family Day"	Elodie Keene	Megan Lynn & Wade Solomon	February 3, 2014	1.80
15	15	"Padre"	Millicent Shelton	Story by : Tamara P. Carter; Teleplay by : Bradley Bredeweg & Peter Paige	February 10, 2014	1.83
16	16	"Us Against the World"	Lee Rose	Kelly Fullerton	February 17, 2014	1.68
17	17	"Kids in the Hall"	Michael Grossman	Megan Lynn & Wade Solomon	February 24, 2014	1.48
18	18	"Escapes and Reversals"	Melanie Mayron	Story by : Joanna Johnson; Teleplay by : Thomas Higgins	March 3, 2014	1.51
19	19	"Don't Let Go"	Zetna Fuentes	Story by : Marissa Jo Cerar & Zoila Amelia Galeano; Teleplay by : Kelly Fullerton & Marissa Jo Cerar	March 10, 2014	1.21
20	20	"Metropolis"	Martha Mitchell	Joanna Johnson	March 17, 2014	1.20
21	21	"Adoption Day"	Norman Buckley	Bradley Bredeweg & Peter Paige	March 24, 2014	1.29

=== Season 2 (2014–15) ===
No. overall	No. in season	Title	Directed by	Written by	Original release date	US viewers (millions)
22	1	"Things Unknown"	Norman Buckley	Bradley Bredeweg & Peter Paige	June 16, 2014	1.47
23	2	"Take Me Out"	Elodie Keene	Megan Lynn & Wade Solomon	June 23, 2014	1.45
24	3	"Play"	Martha Mitchell	Thomas Higgins	June 30, 2014	1.37
25	4	"Say Something"	Zetna Fuentes	Kathleen McGhee-Anderson	July 7, 2014	1.42
26	5	"Truth Be Told"	Ron Lagomarsino	Kelly Fullerton	July 14, 2014	1.61
27	6	"Mother"	Lee Rose	Joanna Johnson	July 21, 2014	1.51
28	7	"The Longest Day"	Nzingha Stewart	Marissa Jo Cerar	July 28, 2014	1.44
29	8	"Girls Reunited"	Daisy Mayer	Story by : Joanna Johnson; Teleplay by : Bradley Bredeweg & Peter Paige	August 4, 2014	1.38
30	9	"Leaky Faucets"	Lee Rose	Story by : Cristian Martinez; Teleplay by : Bradley Bredeweg & Peter Paige	August 11, 2014	1.35
31	10	"Someone's Little Sister"	Norman Buckley	Joanna Johnson	August 18, 2014	1.48
32	11	"Christmas Past"	Norman Buckley	Joanna Johnson	December 8, 2014	1.93
33	12	"Over Under"	Peter Paige	Bradley Bredeweg & Peter Paige	January 19, 2015	1.45
34	13	"Stay"	Elodie Keene	Marissa Jo Cerar	January 26, 2015	1.20
35	14	"Mother Nature"	Martha Mitchell	Thomas Higgins	February 2, 2015	1.26
36	15	"Light of Day"	Ron Lagomarsino	Wade Solomon & Megan Lynn	February 9, 2015	1.24
37	16	"If You Only Knew"	Aprill Winney	Kelly Fullerton	February 16, 2015	1.28
38	17	"The Silence She Keeps"	Melanie Mayron	Cristian Martinez & Dan Richter	February 23, 2015	1.25
39	18	"Now Hear This"	Rob Morrow	Thomas Higgins	March 2, 2015	1.23
40	19	"Justify the Means"	Jay Karas	Joanna Johnson	March 9, 2015	1.14
41	20	"Not That Kind of Girl"	Lee Rose	Story by : Kris Q. Rehl; Teleplay by : Bradley Bredeweg & Peter Paige	March 16, 2015	1.32
42	21	"The End of the Beginning"	Zetna Fuentes	Joanna Johnson and Bradley Bredeweg & Peter Paige	March 23, 2015	1.45

=== Season 3 (2015–16) ===
No. overall	No. in season	Title	Directed by	Written by	Original release date	US viewers (millions)
43	1	"Wreckage"	Peter Paige	Bradley Bredeweg & Peter Paige	June 8, 2015	1.26
44	2	"Father's Day"	Aprill Winney	Joanna Johnson	June 15, 2015	0.97
45	3	"Déjà Vu"	Charlie Stratton	Thomas Higgins	June 22, 2015	1.00
46	4	"More Than Words"	Daisy Mayer	Marissa Jo Cerar	June 29, 2015	1.18
47	5	"Going South"	Elodie Keene	Michael MacLennan	July 6, 2015	1.30
48	6	"It's My Party"	Kees Van Oostrum	Megan Lynn & Wade Solomon	July 13, 2015	1.30
49	7	"Faith, Hope, Love"	Jann Turner	Cristian Martinez & Kris Q. Rehl	July 20, 2015	1.33
50	8	"Daughters"	Chandra Wilson	Elle Johnson	August 3, 2015	1.23
51	9	"Idyllwild"	Joanna Johnson	Joanna Johnson	August 10, 2015	1.06
52	10	"Lucky"	Peter Paige	Bradley Bredeweg & Peter Paige	August 17, 2015	1.24
53	11	"First Impressions"	Peter Paige	Bradley Bredeweg & Peter Paige	January 25, 2016	1.05
54	12	"Mixed Messages"	Rich Newey	Thomas Higgins	February 1, 2016	0.79
55	13	"If and When"	Elodie Keene	Anne Meredith	February 8, 2016	0.84
56	14	"Under Water"	Ron Lagomarsino	Joanna Johnson	February 15, 2016	0.81
57	15	"Minor Offenses"	Rob Morrow	Michael MacLennan	February 22, 2016	0.79
58	16	"EQ"	Anne Renton	Anne Meredith	February 29, 2016	0.67
59	17	"Sixteen"	Elodie Keene	Marissa Jo Cerar	March 7, 2016	0.84
60	18	"Rehearsal"	Norman Buckley	Megan Lynn & Wade Solomon	March 14, 2016	0.73
61	19	"The Show"	Bradley Bredeweg	Story by : Joanna Johnson; Teleplay by : Bradley Bredeweg & Peter Paige	March 21, 2016	0.80
62	20	"Kingdom Come"	Joanna Johnson	Story by : Bradley Bredeweg & Peter Paige; Teleplay by : Joanna Johnson	March 28, 2016	0.77

=== Season 4 (2016–17) ===
No. overall	No. in season	Title	Directed by	Written by	Original release date	US viewers (millions)
63	1	"Potential Energy"	Rob Morrow	Bradley Bredeweg & Peter Paige	June 20, 2016	0.91
64	2	"Safe"	Rob Morrow	Joanna Johnson	June 27, 2016	1.05
65	3	"Trust"	Elodie Keene	Anne Meredith	July 11, 2016	0.80
66	4	"Now for Then"	Silas Howard	Constance M. Burge	July 18, 2016	0.82
67	5	"Forty"	Velvet Andrews Smith	Megan Lynn & Wade Solomon	July 25, 2016	0.84
68	6	"Justify"	Kelli Williams	Cristian Martinez	August 1, 2016	0.93
69	7	"Highs and Lows"	Chandra Wilson	Kris Q. Rehl	August 8, 2016	0.80
70	8	"Girl Code"	Aprill Winney	Story by : Dan Richter; Teleplay by : Megan Lynn & Wade Solomon	August 15, 2016	0.88
71	9	"New York"	Joanna Johnson	Joanna Johnson	August 22, 2016	0.88
72	10	"Collateral Damage"	Peter Paige	Bradley Bredeweg & Peter Paige	August 29, 2016	0.99
73	11	"Insult to Injury"	Rob Morrow	Bradley Bredeweg & Peter Paige	January 31, 2017	0.92
74	12	"Dream a Little Dream"	Rob Morrow	Joanna Johnson	February 7, 2017	0.67
75	13	"Cruel and Unusual"	Norman Buckley	Anne Meredith	February 14, 2017	0.76
76	14	"Doors and Windows"	Susan Flannery	Constance M. Burge	February 21, 2017	0.73
77	15	"Sex Ed"	Michael Medico	Kris Q. Rehl	February 28, 2017	0.66
78	16	"The Long Haul"	Bradley Bredeweg	Megan Lynn & Wade Solomon	March 14, 2017	0.71
79	17	"Diamond in the Rough"	Lily Mariye	Cristian Martinez	March 21, 2017	0.69
80	18	"Dirty Laundry"	Laura Nisbet Peters	Megan Lynn & Wade Solomon	March 28, 2017	0.69
81	19	"Who Knows"	Joanna Johnson	Joanna Johnson	April 4, 2017	0.62
82	20	"Until Tomorrow"	Peter Paige	Bradley Bredeweg & Peter Paige	April 11, 2017	0.72

=== Season 5 (2017–18) ===
No. overall	No. in season	Title	Directed by	Written by	Original release date	US viewers (millions)
83	1	"Resist"	Peter Paige	Bradley Bredeweg & Peter Paige	July 11, 2017	0.87
84	2	"Exterminate Her"	Danny Nucci	Joanna Johnson	July 18, 2017	0.69
85	3	"Contact"	Aprill Winney	Anne Meredith	July 25, 2017	0.76
86	4	"Too Fast, Too Furious"	Tate Donovan	Cristian Martinez	August 1, 2017	0.66
87	5	"Telling"	Anne Renton	Kris Q. Rehl	August 8, 2017	0.69
88	6	"Welcome to the Jungler"	Kelli Williams	Megan Lynn & Wade Solomon	August 15, 2017	0.61
89	7	"Chasing Waterfalls"	Chandra Wilson	Bradley Bredeweg & Peter Paige	August 22, 2017	0.58
90	8	"Engaged"	Kees Van Oostrum	Megan Lynn & Wade Solomon	August 29, 2017	0.58
91	9	"Prom"	Joanna Johnson	Joanna Johnson	September 5, 2017	0.74
92	10	"Sanctuary"	Rob Morrow	Bradley Bredeweg & Peter Paige	January 9, 2018	0.52
93	11	"Invisible"	Laura Nisbet Peters	Story by : Kimberly Ndombe; Teleplay by : Megan Lynn & Wade Solomon	January 16, 2018	0.70
94	12	"#IWasMadeInAmerica"	Lee Rose	Anne Meredith	January 23, 2018	0.62
95	13	"Line in the Sand"	Cheryl Dunye	Dan Richter	January 30, 2018	0.56
96	14	"Scars"	Kelli Williams	Cristian Martinez & Kris Q. Rehl	February 6, 2018	0.57
97	15	"Mother's Day"	Bradley Bredeweg	Joanna Johnson	February 13, 2018	0.52
98	16	"Giving Up the Ghost"	Michael Medico	Megan Lynn & Wade Solomon	February 27, 2018	0.54
99	17	"Makeover"	Laura Nisbet Peters	Cristian Martinez & Kris Q. Rehl	March 6, 2018	0.50
100	18	"Just Say Yes"	Joanna Johnson	Joanna Johnson	March 13, 2018	0.53
101	19	"Many Roads"	Peter Paige	Bradley Bredeweg & Peter Paige	March 13, 2018	0.48
102	20	"Meet the Fosters"	Michael Medico	Megan Lynn & Wade Solomon	June 4, 2018	0.63
103	21	"Turks & Caicos"	Joanna Johnson	Joanna Johnson	June 5, 2018	0.61
104	22	"Where the Heart Is"	Joanna Johnson	Joanna Johnson	June 6, 2018	0.63

== Webisodes ==
=== The Fosters: Girls United ===
At the start of the second part of the first season of The Fosters, a five-episode web series called The Fosters: Girls United was confirmed by ABC Family. It stars Maia Mitchell, Daffany Clark, Cherinda Kincherlow, Annamarie Kenoyer, Alicia Sixtos, Hayley Kiyoko, and Angela Gibbs. Girls United premiered on ABC Family's official YouTube account on February 3, 2014. Each episode runs approximately 5 minutes long.

No.	Title	Originally posted
1	"Run Baby Run"	February 3, 2014
Gabi goes missing and Girls United counselor, Michelle, calls a meeting to ask if the girls know anything about where she may have run off to.
2	"Stab in the Back"	February 3, 2014
The girls discuss who of them can be pregnant.
3	"Got Your Back"	February 3, 2014
Callie and Kiara share some mutual secrets. Callie also discovers that Becka harms herself with a knife.
4	"Scorpion Kings"	February 3, 2014
Gabi's father visits the Girls United home for some information about Gabi.
5	"United We Stand"	February 3, 2014
Gabi comes back and reveals she went away because she has HIV.

== Ratings ==
The Fosters : U.S. viewers per episode (millions)

Season	Episode number																						Average
Season	1	2	3	4	5	6	7	8	9	10	11	12	13	14	15	16	17	18	19	20	21	22	Average
1	1.42	1.70	1.25	1.89	1.78	1.77	1.79	1.89	1.87	2.07	1.92	2.14	1.88	1.80	1.83	1.68	1.48	1.51	1.21	1.20	1.29	–	1.68
2	1.47	1.45	1.37	1.42	1.61	1.51	1.44	1.38	1.35	1.48	1.93	1.45	1.20	1.26	1.24	1.28	1.25	1.23	1.14	1.32	1.45	–	1.39
3	1.26	0.97	1.00	1.18	1.30	1.30	1.33	1.23	1.06	1.24	1.05	0.79	0.84	0.81	0.79	0.67	0.84	0.73	0.80	0.77	–		1.00
4	0.91	1.05	0.80	0.82	0.84	0.93	0.80	0.88	0.88	0.99	0.92	0.67	0.76	0.73	0.66	0.71	0.69	0.69	0.62	0.72	–		0.80
5	0.87	0.69	0.76	0.66	0.69	0.61	0.58	0.58	0.74	0.52	0.70	0.62	0.56	0.57	0.52	0.54	0.50	0.53	0.48	0.63	0.61	0.63	0.62

Audience measurement performed by Nielsen Media Research
