= Anthony Spanos =

Australian actor (born 1995)

- Born: 5 May 1995 (age 29); Australia
- Occupation: Actor
- Years active: 2005–2012
- Notable work: Hector Papdopoulos in Streetsmartz; Josh Jacobs in Trapped

Anthony Spanos (born 5 May 1995) is an Australian actor. He has starred in the Australian television series Streetsmartz and more recently Trapped. He attended Trinity College in Perth, Western Australia.

== Trapped ==
In the children/teenage television series Trapped (2008, Northway Productions Pty Ltd, 7 Network), Spanos plays the character of Josh Jacobs. When the mysterious disappearance of their parents from a remote scientific research station takes place, they leave a group of children trapped in a dangerous paradise.

== Streetsmartz ==
Spanos plays the character of Hector Papdopoulos in the children/teenage television series Streetsmartz (2005–2006, Nine Network). Streetsmartz is centered on the lives of a group of children, their friends and family who live in Fremantle, in Western Australia. Three series, with a total of 39 episodes, were screened.

The character of Hector is described as 'nine going on nineteen'. He's a sidekick and partner to his brother's business ventures but often reluctantly – Hector is more interested in having fun and causing havoc than in actually working.

== Castaway ==
Spanos appeared in Castaway, a spin-off from Trapped. He reprised the character of Josh Jacobs.
