= Castaway (TV series) =

- Developed by: Northway Productions; Screen West; Lottery West
- Starring: Benjamin Jay; Maia Mitchell; Anthony Spanos; Mikayla Southgate; Joshua Hibble; Natasha Phillips; Matilda Terbio; Brad Albert; Lincoln Hall; Peter Gwynne
- Country of origin: Australia
- No. of seasons: 1
- No. of episodes: 26

Production
- Executive producer: Bruce Best
- Running time: 25 minutes (approx)

Original release
- Network: Sveriges Television
- Release: 1 November – 6 December 2010
- Network: Seven Network
- Release: 12 February – 30 July 2011

Related
- Trapped

Castaway is an Australian children's television series that premiered in Australia on the Seven Network on 12 February 2011. The series is a sequel to the 2008 series Trapped. It was delayed from its initial premiere date in 2010 and as a result first aired on Swedish television, premiering on 1 November 2010 and ending on 6 December 2010.

== Reviews ==
Youth Television News reviewed the series positively, with the comment "a higher quality of acting, cameras, filming locations and writing, overshadows the previous series in a good way".

== Cast ==
- Benjamin Jay as Ryan Cavaner
- Maia Mitchell as Natasha Hamilton
- Anthony Spanos as Josh Jacobs
- Mikayla Southgate as Jarrah Haddon
- Joshua Hibble as Zuke Haddon
- Natasha Phillips as Lily Taylor
- Matilda Terbio as Emma Taylor
- Brad Albert as Gabe Schwartz
- Tara Bilston as Saskia
- Sarah Mills as Dionne
- Lincoln Hall as Eli Fox
- Mukundan Jr as Dr. Hamilton
- Peter Gwynne as Sergeant Holt
- Community Group - Luisa Mitchell, Chelsea Albert, Logan Deily

== Episodes ==
No.	Title	Directed by	Written by	Swedish airdate	Australian airdate
1	"Shipwrecked!"	Paul Komadina	Hamilton Budd	1 November 2010	12 February 2011
It's been six months since Ryan and his friends got trapped on The Island. They build a raft but get caught in a storm. The raft breaks, causing the kids to end up on a new island, separated from each other. Josh and Ryan soon find each other trapped in a hole; Jarrah and Gabe also find each other, and they later find Zuke. Lily and Em are also together, but Natasha and the mystery girl (from the last episode of Trapped) are nowhere to be found. Ryan and Josh are helped out of the hole by a girl named Saskia, who is also trapped on the island. But is she to be trusted?
2	"Behind the Mask"	Paul Komadina	Tracy Defty	2 November 2010	19 February 2011
It's morning, and Lily and Em go out to find the others. When they take a shortcut over a mud-covered field, Lily gets mud in her eye. She tells Em to quickly go and get water, but instead of water, Em finds three strangers in masks who start to chase her. Meanwhile, Josh starts to become friends with Saskia. Ryan, however, is still not sure if he should trust her since she tried to steal the antidote.
3	"The Lonely Road"	Paul Komadina	Hamilton Budd	3 November 2010	26 February 2011
Gabe goes to get some fruit, but he finds the strangers in masks instead. He doesn't tell Jarrah and Zuke about the strangers, but later the strangers kidnap Zuke. Lily and Em finally reunite with Ryan and Josh, but Saskia causes suspicion as she seems to know the strangers in masks.
4	"Trump Card"	Paul Komadina	Hamilton Budd	4 November 2010	5 March 2011
The strangers in masks have captured Ryan and his friends (Natasha and mystery girl not included) with some assistance from Saskia. The prisoners are being held in a cage in a camp full of kids and no adults. Meanwhile, Saskia has stolen the antidote. Ryan escapes from the cage and comes back to the camp in disguise to save his friends and retrieve the antidote.
5	"What to Believe"	Ben Young	Tracey Defty	5 November 2010	12 March 2011
Ryan has the antidote again and has decided that he and his friends are going to stay at the camp for a while. Later, the newcomers participate in a camp ritual. During the ritual, Ryan and his friends find out that the other kids in the camp are also kids to scientists whom Dr Hamilton has imprisoned.
6	"Point of No Return"	Ben Young	Hamilton Budd	8 November 2010	19 March 2011
Ryan and his friends are preparing to leave the camp, but they're not the only ones; all the other kids in the camp also want to join since they think the antidote is magical and can protect them. The leader, Dionne, is against the other kids leaving, so she shows Ryan where some other kids that tried to leave the camp were found dead. Meanwhile, Em and her friend Max (Jacob Clarke) play pranks and get in trouble.
7	"Ghosts of the Past"	Ben Young	Lucinda Marty	9 November 2010	26 March 2011
To protect the kids, Ryan has thrown away the antidote. When he later goes to search for it, he finds the enterprise package but he pretends that he found it. It's a new day, and Lily, Josh, Gabe, Dionne and some other kids are on a journey for honey but they also find a carriage that belonged to a woman named Cath and her daughter but there's no sign of them.
8	"Hot Knife, Warm Butter"	Ben Young	Ben Young	10 November 2010	2 April 2011
They don't find Cath and her daughter but they found out something else, Cath's last name is Schwartz and she's Gabe's mother. A few days later, back in camp, Ryan finds out that Dionne has the antidote and Dionne says that if he tells anyone about it, she will pour it out. Meanwhile Saskia is trying to become friends with Josh again but Josh is still seems to hate her so Em and Gemma (Logan Deiley) tries to solve it by putting them in the cage.
9	"You & Me"	Claire Marshall	Hamilton Budd	11 November 2010	9 April 2011
Ryan and Jarrah have been kicked out of the camp without the antidote but Saskia steals it, gives it to Josh and he gives it to Ryan. When Ryan got the antidote, they start their trip to find Dr. Hamilton but they notice that they are followed but Ryan finds out that it's Gabe. Gabe is there because he wants the antidote and after some discussion, Ryan gives it to him. Meanwhile, Jarrah is out looking for water but instead she finds Natasha and the Mystery Girl who's called Hope (Luisa Mitchell). Natasha has injured her ankle so Jarrah says she will go and get Ryan but is she really going to tell Ryan.
10	"Love Bites"	Claire Marshall	Tracey Defty	12 November 2010	16 April 2011
Natasha and Hope are lucky because while Jarrah didn't tell Ryan and Gabe about Natasha and Hope, Gabe found them and helped them to get to the camp. Jarrah and Ryan continue their journey but need to return to camp since Jarrah has been bitten by a snake. Back at camp they help Natasha with her ankle and to cheer her up, they invent and perform a play about how much Ryan misses her.
11	"Handling the Truth"	Claire Marshall	Kate Rice	15 November 2010	23 April 2011
There is some trouble back in camp, Ryan has love trouble with Natasha and Jarrah and there are some kidnappers tying to kidnap the kids and the kidnappers seems to have some assistance from Saskia. Besides this there are some extra love trouble, Sasika and Josh are a couple but Lily has started to like Josh too. In the end, two of these troubles are over, the kidnappers kidnapped Tom (Louis Biggs) and Natasha breaks up with Ryan.
12	"Game Over"	Claire Marshall	Tracey Defty	16 November 2010	30 April 2011
Lily and Jarrah are getting really suspicious and they know there's something wrong about Saskia. They go to through her stuff and finds a codebook but when Saskia finds out she throws it in the fire and then Lily and Jarrah really knows there is something wrong. Later they find a note written in Morse code and with help from Zuke, they have real evidence that she works with the kidnappers.
13	"Should I Stay or Should I Go"	Grant Sputore	Tracey Defty	17 November 2010	7 May 2011
It's almost time to leave the camp but a house falls down and since Zuke accidentally made the house fall, they stay to re-build the house. Zuke tells Em about how he made the house fall and that he doesn't want to leave the camp since he also knows about the kids who died. Later their carriage also breaks and it is Zuke this time also. Jarrah decides that she and Zuke will stay. Meanwhile, Natasha tries to get the kids to stop being afraid for Dr. Hamilton but it ends up with Natasha telling them that she is his daughter.
14	"Subtext: I Love You"	Grant Sputore	Hamilton Budd	18 November 2010	14 May 2011
Ryan, Natasha, Gabe, Josh and Lily has left Jarrah, Zuke, Em and the other kids at the camp and begins their journey to the Enterprise base where they hope to find their families. At the beginning of the journey, it turns out that Em has followed them since they left the camp and after some arguing with Lily, she gets to stay. Natasha and Ryan are still fighting but to solve it, Lily and Josh sends them to find water. Instead of water, Natasha, Gabe and Ryan finds an old Enterprise base that also was the base where the kids back in camp came from.
15	"Falling for You"	Grant Sputore	Brooke Wilson	19 November 2010	21 May 2011
It has been a week since Ryan, Natasha, Gabe, Josh, Lily, and Em left camp, and they are out of food and water. After freeing the cart from a sand dune, Gabe falls over a rope that leads to a raft. Gabe and Em take the cart to search for water while the others fix the raft and prepare it for fishing. In a ploy to get Ryan and Natasha back together, Josh and Lily offer to take the raft out fishing, leaving the former lovers to search for Saskia's trail. While searching for the trail, Ryan and Natasha hear the motor of a boat. They try to wave it down but are unsuccessful. As Ryan and Natasha finally talk about their relationship, Lily tries to cope with her unrequited feelings for Josh. The group reunites over a dinner of fish and fresh water, but someone from Enterprise is watching them as well.
16	"Honourable Intentions"	Grant Sputore	Tracey Defty	22 November 2010	28 May 2011
Ryan and his friends are getting closer to the Enterprise base, but they remain unaware that a Snatcher is watching them. After being tricked into thinking that there are dingoes nearby, the group decides to leave the trail to find a safer way around the animals. While Ryan and Natasha go ahead to find an alternate route, the others stay back to rest up before their journey. Fed up with the others' decision to rest up before leaving the trail, Em steals the antidote and runs away. Gabe finds her and convinces her to return to the others. Just as they reunite, they see the Snatcher that was spying on them and chase him. Meanwhile, Ryan and Natasha find a path and an old caravan, which turns out to be where Dr. Hamilton started his research. A Snatcher overhears Natasha say that she is Dr. Hamilton's daughter and kidnaps her after she has an argument with Ryan. The others look for her but only find the remains of a trap and Natasha's blood on the ground.
17	"Love and Other Bruises"	Mike Hoath	Lucinda Marty	23 November 2010	4 June 2011
With Natasha gone, everyone is on high alert. Gabe notices someone spying on them and works with Ryan to capture the spy, who turns out to be a kid. The kid reveals that Dr. Hamilton isn't at the Enterprise Base and that someone else is in charge. Gabe and the others release the kid against Ryan's wishes, knowing that the kid will inadvertently lead them straight to the camp. Back at the camp, Saskia is helping tend to Natasha, who remains unconscious. The spy, Ned, returns to camp but does not tell Saskia that he had been caught. After breaking a wheel off the cart, Ryan and Gabe go ahead to check out the camp while the others fix the wheel and follow behind. Josh and Lily finally share their first kiss, but it doesn't turn out as well as they thought as Lily tells Em it was like kissing a brother. Ryan and Gabe arrive at the camp and discover that there are no adults there at all. Em, Lily, Gabe, and Josh are reunited with Saskia while Ryan is taken to see Natasha. Natasha introduces Ryan to her old friend and the leader of the camp, Eli Fox.
18	"Smoking Gun"	Mike Hoath	Hamilton Budd	24 November 2010	11 June 2011
While Ryan and his friends remain suspicious of the base, Natasha tries to convince them that everything is alright: it was the pharmaceutical companies that caused the trouble; her father is finishing his research, legally this time; and the kids at the base are working there to gain experience. Ryan goes snooping to find evidence that would prove that what the kids are doing is unsafe and accidentally destroys two weeks of research in the process. Even after promising Natasha that he'll keep an open mind, Ryan goes snooping again, this time finding a map that shows the camp as well as a nearby "Forbidden Area." Ryan heads to the Forbidden Area but runs into some falling rocks and needs Eli to save him. Still, Ryan tells Gabe that he still doesn't believe Eli as Eli eavesdrops on their conversation. Meanwhile, Lily finds out that she doesn't like Josh anymore but she doesn't break up with him since she doesn't want him to get back with Saskia. Unfortunately, Josh hears Lily talking to Em about all of this.
19	"Old Flames"	Mike Hoath	Tracey Defty	25 November 2010	18 June 2011
While helping a girl named Bonnie (Baillie Millar) with some algae, Josh decides to play a joke on her by pushing her into the water. Unfortunately, she gets stung by a jellyfish, and Josh gets Ryan and Eli to help her. Eli overhears Josh ask Ryan about using the antidote and later questions Saksia about it. Having overheard Ryan say that they left it in the cart, Eli tricks Natasha into bringing the cart (which had been abandoned a short distance from the camp) back to camp. While Eli, Natasha, Lily, and Ryan head out to find the cart, Josh and Em unsuccessfully try to cheer up Bonnie. When Ryan and Eli find the cart, Ryan tells Eli that the antidote is gone, but he has actually just hidden it. Eli, Saksia and Bonnie then pretend that Bonnie has gone into shock and cure her with an antidote of their own. Ryan falls for the act and believes they no longer need the antidote. With Ryan's guard down, Eli steals the antidote.
20	"Kid Gloves"	Mike Hoath	Hamilton Budd	26 November 2010	25 June 2011
Although Ryan and his friends have been tricked into believing Eli, Lily and Gabe still feel that something is wrong about the entire situation. Gabe's suspicions are only heightened when he finds Bonnie stealing something from the kids' tent. Bonnie hides the stolen object in a locker, so Gabe enlists Lily and Em to help him break into the locker. Not only do the kids discover that Bonnie took a walkie-talkie, they learn that her real name is Ebony and that she's Gabe's sister. When Gabe confronts Ebony about this new information, she accuses him of trying to trick her. She later believes him but runs off before she can tell him about their mother. Meanwhile, Natasha convinces Ryan to help Eli for the day. After Eli treats Ryan for an algae sting, Ryan begins to trust the leader. His faith in Eli doesn't last long, however, as Gabe, Lily, and Em have learned that the kids at the base are being forced to work with the threat of never seeing their parents again if they refuse.
21	"Best Laid Plans"	Damien Spiccia	Brooke Wilson	29 November 2010	2 July 2011
To ensure that they will see their parents again, Ryan devises a plan to steal some algae and use it to make a deal with Eli. The plan goes awry, however, when Tom tells the gang that the algae will rot if it is not kept in a cold environment. Meanwhile, Eli woos Natasha while she is upset with Ryan. When Natasha finds the antidote on Eli's desk, he confesses that Bonnie faked being sick. Taking the antidote with her, Natasha leaves Eli, telling him that Ryan and Saskia were right about him all along. Saskia intercepts Natasha and reveals that Eli has a crush on her, driving Natasha back to Eli.
22	"Paradise Lost"	Damien Spiccia	Hamilton Budd	30 November 2010	2 July 2011
Pressured to reach the quota by the end of the week, Eli launches an expedition to find more kids to bring to the base. While the snatchers search for kids in the community, Jarrah attempts to steal their boat. The snatchers come back with Zuke before she is able to get away, so Jarrah allows herself to be captured to save her brother. On the boat, Jarrah manages to stop the engine so Zuke can escape. Jarrah is taken to the base. Meanwhile, drama continues with Natasha, Eli and Ryan. Saskia, upset with Eli's expedition, tricks Eli into telling her about that he didn't really like Natasha while Natasha is listening. After realizing that Eli was just using her, Natasha apologizes to Ryan. When Ryan finds out that Natasha approved the snatchers going back to the community, however, he breaks up with Natasha.
23	"Crossroads"	Damien Spiccia	Hamilton Budd	1 December 2010	9 July 2011
The work at the base is done and the boats are coming to pick up all the kids, or at least that's what the kids think. There is only 1 boat that will come and it's reserved for Eli and Natasha, the rest of the kids will be left at the base for the rest of their life. Saskia finds out about it that they will be left there (but not about that there will be only one boat) and She decides that Josh and herself are going back to the camp to convince Dionne, Zuke and the other kids to leave the camp and help them with hijack the boats.
24	"Beware of the Snake"	Andrew Lewis	Tracey Defty and Hamilton Budd	2 December 2010	16 July 2011
Josh and Saskia has arrived to the camp and after showing the kids some files about their families, they manage to convince them to join them back at the base. They start to transport some of the kids to the base but then, when the engine breaks, the rest of the kids, Josh and Saskia included, have to walk all the way back to the base. Meanwhile at the base, Ryan has found out about the boat plan and he ruins all the algae in anger. Bonnie finds out that there will be only one boat and that it will stop at another beach they've been told so Eli lock her up.
25	"Out of the Frying pan"	Andrew Lewis	Brooke Wilson	3 December 2010	23 July 2011
The only boat has left and the only passengers are Eli and Natasha; they get to the enterprise base but get thrown out because they don't have any algae and because Dr. Hamilton doesn't want to be disturbed by his family during his work. Meanwhile, the boat back at the base is fixed so while the rest of the kids start to walk to the city, Josh and Ryan starts to go by boat to the city where Dr. Hamilton but the boat breaks and then they get rescued by a fisherman but for real, he's working for Dr. Hamilton. They get chased through the city and in the end they get caught and locked up but Eli and another guy called Marcus (Nick Britton) but they was searching for the antidote which they didn't have because Natasha has given it to Gabe.
26	"The Fat Lady's Singing"	Andrew Lewis	Tracey Defty	6 December 2010	30 July 2011
All the kids have arrived at Dr. Hamilton's base and they hide in a big storage room while Lily, Em, Josh and Saskia goes searching for their parents and Ryan and Gabe goes searching for Dr. Hamilton. Lily and Em finds Gabe's mom, and Eli finds Gabe and Ryan but he says that Natasha is the one who wants the antidote because he has tried one of his antidotes on himself and he's dying. They manage to get to him in time but Eli wants a drop of the antidote but when Natasha says no, he steals it and runs away. Lily finds everyone's parents locked up in another storage room and with Saskia and Josh they release everyone and reunite. Meanwhile Natasha and Ryan get on a boat and chase Eli and drive him back to shore where Ryan tackles him to the ground and almost all the antidote spills out. There is only one drop left and Natasha uses it to save her dying father. Dr. Hamilton wakes up and apologizes to his daughter. Ryan and Natasha then hug and kiss and the episode ends.

== See also ==
- Trapped (Australian TV series)
- List of Australian television series
