= Say Uncle (film) =

- Promotional poster
- Directed by: Peter Paige
- Written by: Peter Paige
- Produced by: Christopher Racster; Peter Paige
- Starring: Peter Paige; Kathy Najimy; Anthony Clark; Melanie Lynskey; Gabrielle Union; Lisa Edelstein
- Distributed by: TLA Releasing
- Release date: July 10, 2005 (Outfest); June 23, 2006 (limited)
- Running time: 90 minutes
- Language: English
- Budget: $650,000
- Box office: $5,361

Say Uncle is a 2005 independent black comedy film. Written and directed by Peter Paige, it stars Paige, Kathy Najimy, Anthony Clark, Gabrielle Union, Lisa Edelstein, and Melanie Lynskey. It was released theatrically in the United States on June 23, 2006.

== Premise ==
Paul (Peter Paige), a childlike artist, becomes upset when his godson's family moves from Oregon to Japan. He tries to compensate for his feeling of loss with visits to the neighborhood playground. Paul's best friend, Russell (Anthony Clark), tries to warn him what people might think if they see him hanging around their kids, but Paul doesn't quite see it that way. It isn't long before a suspicious local mom, Maggie (Kathy Najimy), launches a crusade against the naïve Paul, with an army of furious parents in tow.

== Cast ==
- Peter Paige as Paul Johnson
- Kathy Najimy as Maggie Butler
- Anthony Clark as Russell Trotter
- Melanie Lynskey as Susan
- Gabrielle Union as Elise Carter
- Lisa Edelstein as Sarah Faber
- Jim Ortlieb as David Berman
- Robert Blanche as Phil

== Production ==
=== Casting ===
Kathy Najimy was the first actor that Paige reached out to. He said of her casting, "I loved her from Sister Act [etc.] but it was her New York theatre work [that] made me know that she would understand the darker undertones of the piece and the resonance that it was meant to have".

Referring to the rest of the actors, he said that his best friend recalled his saying that each one was a genius. Paige said that when they gathered to [do a read-through], "I was overwhelmed. I couldn't believe everyone had shown up to help me make this movie".

=== Filming ===
Say Uncle was filmed in Portland, Oregon, in the summer of 2004, during a break between the fourth and fifth seasons of Queer as Folk (on which Paige starred). It had a production schedule of 18 days. Paige chose to shoot on Super 16 mm: "I wanted the grain because of the kind of movie it is. It's heightened reality".

== Release and reception ==
After premiering at Outfest on July 10, 2005, and screening at various other festivals that year, the film was distributed by TLA Releasing on a theater-by-theater basis. It opened in Los Angeles on June 23, 2006, followed by New York on June 30, 2006. It was released on DVD in September that same year.

Say Uncle received a mixed reception, with many critics finding fault with its tone. Writing for The New York Times, Jeannette Catsoulis said, "[the film] may be trying to address gay persecution and social paranoia, but it mostly comes off as a study of arrested development. The movie's most laudable gamble is its refusal to make [the characters] sympathetic, but the moral subtleties are obscured by a one-dimensional script and a protagonist as self-centered and lacking in expression as a fetus. Viewed through Paul's eyes, the complex threads of homophobia are impossible to untangle". In a more positive appraisal, the Los Angeles Times called it "a comedy of the darkly absurd", describing Najimy as "at once hilarious and scary", while saying of Paige, "[he] reveals that he is not only a fearless actor but a skilled and thoughtful [filmmaker]. Say Uncle is a notably risk-taking first feature".

== Notes ==
The New York Times notes that the film's R rating is based on "two boys kissing, one naked-toddler photograph, some naughty words and a lot of bad art". The MPAA's rating reads "Rated R for some language".
