= Peter Paige =

American actor (born 1969)

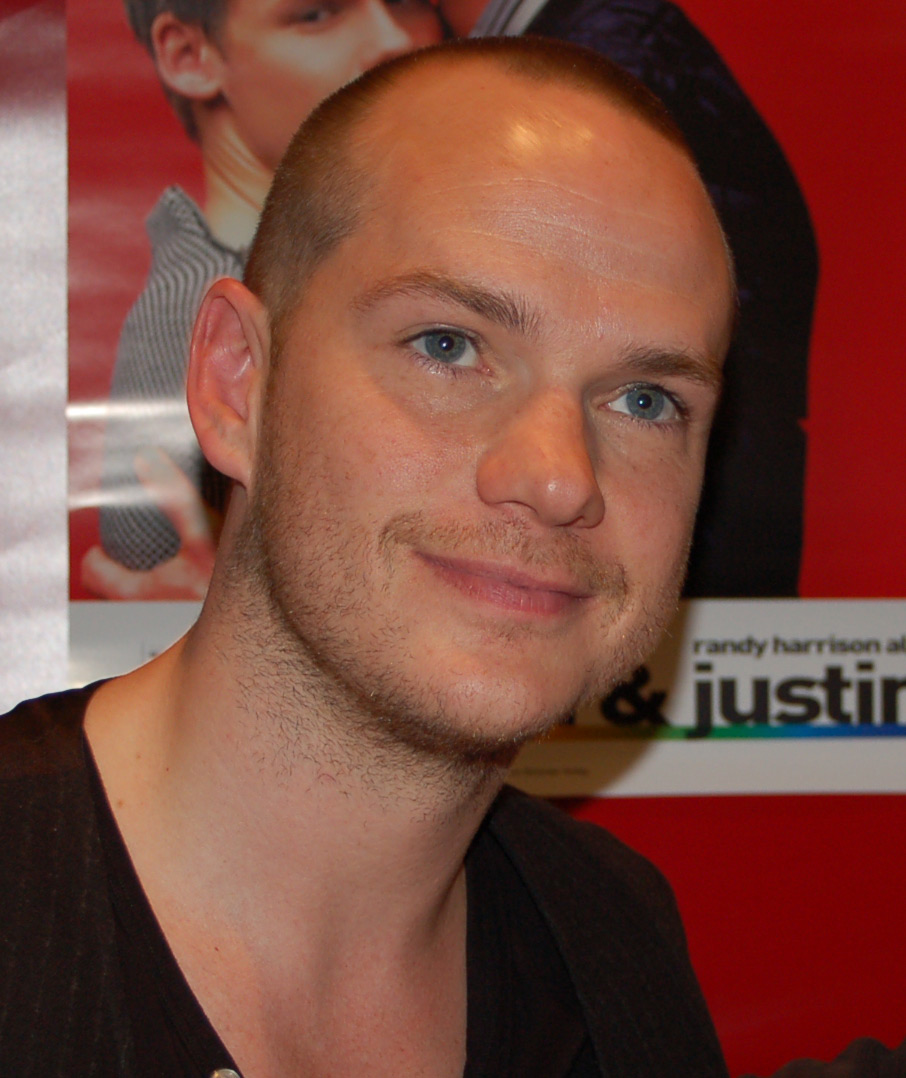
- Paige in 2008
- Born: Peter Michael Paige; June 20, 1969 (age 57); West Hartford, Connecticut, United States
- Education: Boston University
- Occupations: Actor; director; writer; producer
- Years active: 1996–present

Peter Michael Paige (born June 20, 1969) is an American actor, director and screenwriter. He is best known for his portrayal of Emmett Honeycutt in the gay drama series Queer as Folk. His debut as writer and director was on the film Say Uncle.

== Early life and education ==
Paige was born in West Hartford, Connecticut. He graduated from Boston University School of Theatre with a Bachelor of Fine Arts degree summa cum laude.

== Career ==
Best known for his role as Emmett Honeycutt on Showtime's hit series Queer as Folk (2000-2003) Paige has had other television credits that include Will & Grace, Time of Your Life, Girlfriends, Caroline in the City, American Dad!, Related, Grey's Anatomy, The Closer, and Without a Trace. His first audition in Los Angeles earned him a guest-starring role on Suddenly Susan.

Paige spent summer 2004 starring in his feature directorial debut, Say Uncle, alongside Kathy Najimy, Anthony Clark, Melanie Lynskey, Lisa Edelstein and Gabrielle Union. Other film credits include Don McKellar's Childstar with Jennifer Jason Leigh and Dave Foley, Showtime's Our America (which debuted at Sundance in 2002), indie Pop and the award-winning shorts The Four of Us and The Shooting.

An accomplished stage actor, Paige has appeared at major regional theatres throughout the country, most notably in world premieres at La Jolla Playhouse, Portland Center Stage, and Playwrights Horizons. He has performed nearly every genre of play, from the Greeks to Shakespeare to contemporary American work. Plays on his resume include A Midsummer Night's Dream, The Rivals, Secret Agents, You're a Good Man, Charlie Brown and Pantophobia, his two-man show written and performed with Abraham Higginbotham.

On February 6, 2013, it was announced that The Fosters, a show that Paige created along with Bradley, was picked up by the ABC Family. Produced by Jennifer Lopez, the series follows the lives of the Foster family, led by an interracial lesbian couple who are married and raising biological and adoptive children together. The series began airing on June 3, 2013. On January 10, 2017, the network announced a fifth season was picked up.

In 2020, Paige made a guest appearance on Station 19, a spin-off of Grey's Anatomy.

In 2019, Paige wrote and directed the television film The Thing About Harry, which premiered on Freeform in 2020.

== Personal life ==
Paige is openly gay, but keeps his relationship status private.

== Filmography ==
=== Film ===
Title	Year	Role	Notes
1998	The Shooting		Short film
1999	Pop	Nick	
1999	The Joyriders	Family Restaurant Waiter	
2001	The Four of Us	Scott	Short film
2004	Childstar	Tim	
2005	Say Uncle	Paul Johnson	Writer, director, producer
2007	Ping Pong Playa	Gerald Harcourt	
2008	Leaving Barstow	The DJ	Director
2012	Groom's Cake	Scott Green	Short film
2012	Annie and the Gypsy	Roger	
2013	Birthday Cake	Scott Green	
2016	Divorce: The Greatest Hits	Todd	Short film

=== Television ===
Year	Title	Role	Notes
1996	Nowhere Man	Recruit #4	Episode: "Heart of Darkness"
1997	Suddenly Susan	Neil Pomerantz	Episode: "Next Stop, Heaven"
1998	Caroline in the City	Robert	Episode: "Caroline and the Paper Chase"
1999	Undressed	Kirk	5 episodes
1999	Will & Grace	Roger O'Neil	Episode: "Whose Mom Is It Anyway?"
2000	Movie Stars	Nick	Episode: "He's Reese. He's Here. Get Used to It."
2000	Time of Your Life	Assistant	Episode: "The Time They Cheated"
2002	Our America	Gary Covino	Television film
2002	Girlfriends	Zellner	Episode: "Star Craving Mad"
2000–05	Queer as Folk	Emmett Honeycutt	Main role (83 episodes)
2005–06	Related	Patrick	4 episodes
2006	Grey's Anatomy	Benjamin O'Leary	Episode: "I Am a Tree"
2006–10	American Dad!	Jason (voice) / Various Guys (voice)	4 episodes
2007	Without a Trace	Lucas Blumenthal	Episode: "Primed"
2007–09	Rick & Steve: The Happiest Gay Couple in All the World	Steve Ball	Main role (14 episodes)
2009	CSI: Miami	Glenn Wagner	Episode: "Divorce Party"
2009	Raising the Bar	Sean Graydon	Episode: "The Curious Case of Kellerman's Button"
2010	Fly Girls	—N/a	Creator, co-executive producer
2010	The Closer	Ricky	Episode: "Old Money"
2011	Bones	Darren Hargrove	Episode: "The Bikini in the Soup"
2013–18	The Fosters	—N/a	Creator, director, writer, executive producer
2015	Tut	—N/a	Writer
2018	Where the Bears Are	Temperamental Choreographer / Bentley	6 episodes
2019–2024	Good Trouble	—N/a	Creator, director, writer, executive producer
2020	The Thing About Harry	Casey	Television film; Director, screenwriter, producer
2020-2024	Station 19	Cooper	Director, writer, executive producer, co-showrunner (S7)

=== Music videos ===
Year	Title	Artist	Notes
2002	"Some Lovin'"	Murk vs Kristine W	Director
2019	"No More!"	Tonality	Director

== Stage ==
=== Off Broadway (partial credits) ===
- High Concepts (with Robert Sean Leonard) --- Malaparte --- John Ruocco
- Somebody --- Playwrights Horizon --- Yana Landowne
- Eastern Standard --- Equator --- Easley
- Landscape of the Body --- Judith Anderson --- Lisa Goldsmith
- Tartuffe --- Biggs/Rosatti --- Alison Laslett

=== Regional ===
- The History Boys --- The Ahmanson Theatre --- Tom Irwin
- Eden Lane (World Premiere) --- La Jolla Playhouse --- Des McAnuff
- A Midsummer Night's Dream --- Portland Center Stage --- Elizabeth Huddle
- Pantophobia --- HBO Workspace --- Luke Yankee
- Twisted --- The Lex --- Jesse Carmichael
- The Rivals --- Portland Center Stage --- Elizabeth Huddle
- Blue Window --- Edinburgh Theatre Festival --- Richard Seer/Eve Muson
- Secret Agents (Premiere) --- Artemis Productions --- Beth Harper
- You're A Good Man, Charlie Brown --- Charles Playhouse --- John Ruocco
- Twelfth Night --- Huntington Theatre --- Robert Morgan
