= Trapped (Australian TV series) =

- Developed by: Northway Productions; Screen West; Lottery West
- Starring: Marcel Bracks; Benjamin Jay; Maia Mitchell; Anthony Spanos; Mikayla Southgate; Sam Fraser; Natasha Phillips; Matilda Terbio; Kim Walsh; Brad Albert
- Country of origin: Australia
- Original language: English
- No. of seasons: 1
- No. of episodes: 26

Production
- Executive producer: Bruce Best
- Running time: 25 mins. (approx)

Original release
- Network: Seven Network
- Release: 30 November 2008 – 18 April 2009

Related
- Castaway

Trapped is an Australian children's television series which first premiered on 30 November 2008 and finished its first run on 18 April 2009 on the Seven Network. The 26-part series was shot entirely on location in and around Broome, Western Australia from May to October 2008. A follow-up series entitled Castaway began airing on the Seven Network on 12 February 2011. Many of the actors in the main cast of Trapped reprised their roles.

== Premise ==
Following the mysterious disappearance of their parents, a group of children are trapped in a dangerous paradise. They can only rely on their own resources to survive, discover what happened to their parents, and uncover the secret behind the Enterprise Project.

== Cast ==
=== Main ===
- Marcel Bracks as Rob Frazer
- Benjamin Jay as Ryan Cavaner
- Maia Mitchell as Natasha Hamilton
- Anthony Spanos as Josh Jacobs
- Mikayla Southgate as Jarrah Haddon
- Sam Fraser as Suzuki Haddon
- Natasha Phillips as Lily Taylor
- Matilda Terbio as Emma Taylor
- Kim Walsh as Maggie Monks
- Brad Albert as Gabe

== Episodes ==
No.	Title	Directed by	Written by	Original release date
1	"Trapped"	Jeremy Rice	Paul Bennett	30 November 2008
After Ryan's father travels to investigate the happenings at a scientific research facility, he is left alone with strangers on a nearby island base-camp until his father sends him a message to cut off all communications, leaving the base camp isolated.
2	"The Price We Pay"	Jeremy Rice	Hamilton Budd	7 December 2008
Josh abandons Ryan in the isolated forbidden zone for destroying their communications. Surprised by Josh's actions, the girls create a plan to rescue him. Meanwhile, Maggie leaves Rob in charge of the children.
3	"A Joke's a Joke"	Jeremy Rice	Tracey Defty-Rashid & Paul Bennett	14 December 2008
Ryan asks for the help of Natasha to find the walkie talkie from Maggie after their parents still haven't returned. Meanwhile, Zuke runs away after constant bullying by his older sister, Jarrah and Ryan answers a call from his father explaining they will not be back until week's end.
4	"Come with Me if You Want to Live"	Jeremy Rice	Hamilton Budd	21 December 2008
Jarrah refuses to agree with Maggie demands of all the kids move into a place where they can be better supervised. Meanwhile, Natasha discovers that Josh has been hiding a secret from everyone.
5	"To Catch a Thief"	Jeremy Rice	Tracey Defty-Rashid	22 December 2008
Natasha tries to teach Josh how to read without the others knowing and Emma during her attempt to find the food thief with Zuke, discovers while reading her sisters file, Lily is actually a thief.
6	"Haunted"	Ben Young	Paul Bennett & Hamilton Budd	23 December 2008
Zuke becomes scared after he finds a grave in the bush and Maggie decides to tell the children a different story. Meanwhile, Jarrah tries to split up Josh and Natasha.
7	"Acting Up"	Ben Young	Kate Rice & Hamilton Budd	24 December 2008
Lily reveals to Emma, she is actually adopted, causing the sisters to face the problem without their parents. Meanwhile, the boys and the girls compete in a fishing competition to determine who will cook and clean up dinner.
8	"Yo Prince"	Ben Young	Hamilton Budd	25 December 2008
Natasha realises she has feelings for Ryan, however with Ryan's last day at base camp, she believes it's too late to say anything and an accident happens which no one is prepared for.
9	"Who Can You Trust?"	Ben Young	Paul Bennett & Hamilton Budd	26 December 2008
As their parents still haven't returned, Maggie and Josh tell the children, the boat broke down and could not transport the parents back, however Ryan, Natasha and Lily do not believe her and break into Maggie's office to retrieve the walkie talkie, however with it still broken, they decide she was lying and choose to leave to the island themselves.
10	"Warning Signs"	Ben Young	Tracey Defty-Rashid	29 December 2008
In a desperate attempt to keep the children entertained, Josh dares them to enter the forbidden area. However, what they discover is worse than they ever anticipated.
11	"What the Tide Brings"	Sam Barrett	LeeAnne Innes	30 December 2008
The children find the boat Maggie was travelling on, however without her on board, a number of questions arise. Discovering this, Rob hides the keys to the office, meanwhile, Lily arrives in the forbidden area to find the mysterious boy.
12	"Seeing the Light"	Sam Barrett	John Rapsey	31 December 2008
Concern rises about their parents situation and Lily and Zuke try to create communication with the island.
13	"Only the Brave"	Sam Barrett	Hamilton Budd	1 January 2009
Ryan decides to leave the island without any knowledge of how to get there, discovering this, Rob tries to stop him.
14	"Together We Are Not Alone"	Sam Barrett	Tracey Defty-Rashid	2 January 2009
Ryan and Jarrah leave to the island. At base camp, an intruder gets closer to the office and Rob admits to Natasha, he's not who everyone believes.
15	"If you go down into the woods today..."	Sam Barrett	Paul Bennett	4 January 2009
Ryan and Jarrah find themselves stranded at the medical centre on the quarantine island, they decide to repair their boat and return to base camp. Meanwhile, Josh and Rob plan to track down the intruder.
16	"Danger Among Us"	Claire Marshall	Ben Young	7 February 2009
Rob makes attempts at convincing the children Gabe is not really alone, in reaction, Lily crosses over to the forbidden area in order to prove him wrong and search for answers.
17	"Turncoat"	Claire Marshall	Tracey Defty-Rashid	14 February 2009
In order to make Rob trust him, Ryan decides to betray his friends, and give up his relationship with Jarrah in the meantime.
18	"Testing Times"	Claire Marshall	Pete Gleeson & Hamilton Budd	21 February 2009
After Ryan gains Rob's trust, he tries to discover his secrets. Meanwhile, Jarrah proves to Lily she can trust her and Josh attempts to create a friendship with Gabe.
19	"True Colours"	Claire Marshall	Lucinda Marty	28 February 2009
While trying to find Rob's old boat, Josh has to decide whether to retain his loyalty to Ryan or protect Natasha feelings.
20	"Acting Up"	Claire Marshall	Kate Rice	7 March 2009
Ryan is hurt after a dangerous accident while gaining materials to build a raft to travel back to base camp, with his life threatening injuries, Ryan and Natasha admit their feelings for each other. Meanwhile, Lily, Josh and Jarrah rebel against Rob and break Gabe out of prison.
21	"Good People"	Paul Komadina	Hamilton Budd	14 March 2009
After Rob destroys the diary belonging to Mr.Schwartz, Lily assists Gabe in letting go of past problems and move on. Meanwhile, Zuke finds a research lab owned by Gabe's father, which leads him to the conclusion of Rob being on his side.
22	"The Wood for the Trees"	Paul Komadina	Paul Bennett	21 March 2009
Jarrah refuses rescue and trades her freedom for information concerning the island. Emma and Zuke plot to make Rob reveal the encoded diary to them and Gabe and Lily demand answers from Ryan while Josh deals with Natasha and him being just friends.
23	"Drawing the Line"	Paul Komadina	Tracey Defty-Rashid	28 March 2009
Jarrah breaks out from the prison to help search for a missing Zuke, instead of acting on her plan to retrieve the map. Meanwhile, Ryan and Natasha test the raft, resulting in failure, however are rescued by Josh and Gabe soon after.
24	"Actions Speak Loudest"	Paul Komadina	Tracey Defty-Rashid	4 April 2009
Natasha discovers both Rob and Ryan have lying to her and has to decide which person to trust, originally to pick Rob, the boys try to convince her Rob cannot be trusted.
25	"Punchlines"	Paul Komadina	Hamilton Budd	11 April 2009
The children force Rob to depart base camp, however with Zuke's health deteriorating, they face regret the decision as Rob knows how to cure Zuke's illness. Meanwhile, Gabe is asked to stay at camp and Emma tries to cure Zuke.
26	"The Island"	Paul Komadina	Hamilton Budd	18 April 2009
The children plot to travel to the Island together, however their plans are nearly dismantled after finding a warning message from Mr. Taylor explaining not to come after Dr. Hamilton has gone mad, The children decide to ignore the message and go ahead with the voyage. However when they arrive, they find themselves all alone and their parents belongings scattered around the buildings, Rob then secretly steals the boat and the antidote with him, however he does not realize Zuke swapped the antidote with detergent until the boat breaks down meters from the research island, leaving him and the rest of the children trapped.

== See also ==
- Castaway (TV series)
- List of Australian television series
