= Maia Mitchell =

Australian actress (born 1993)

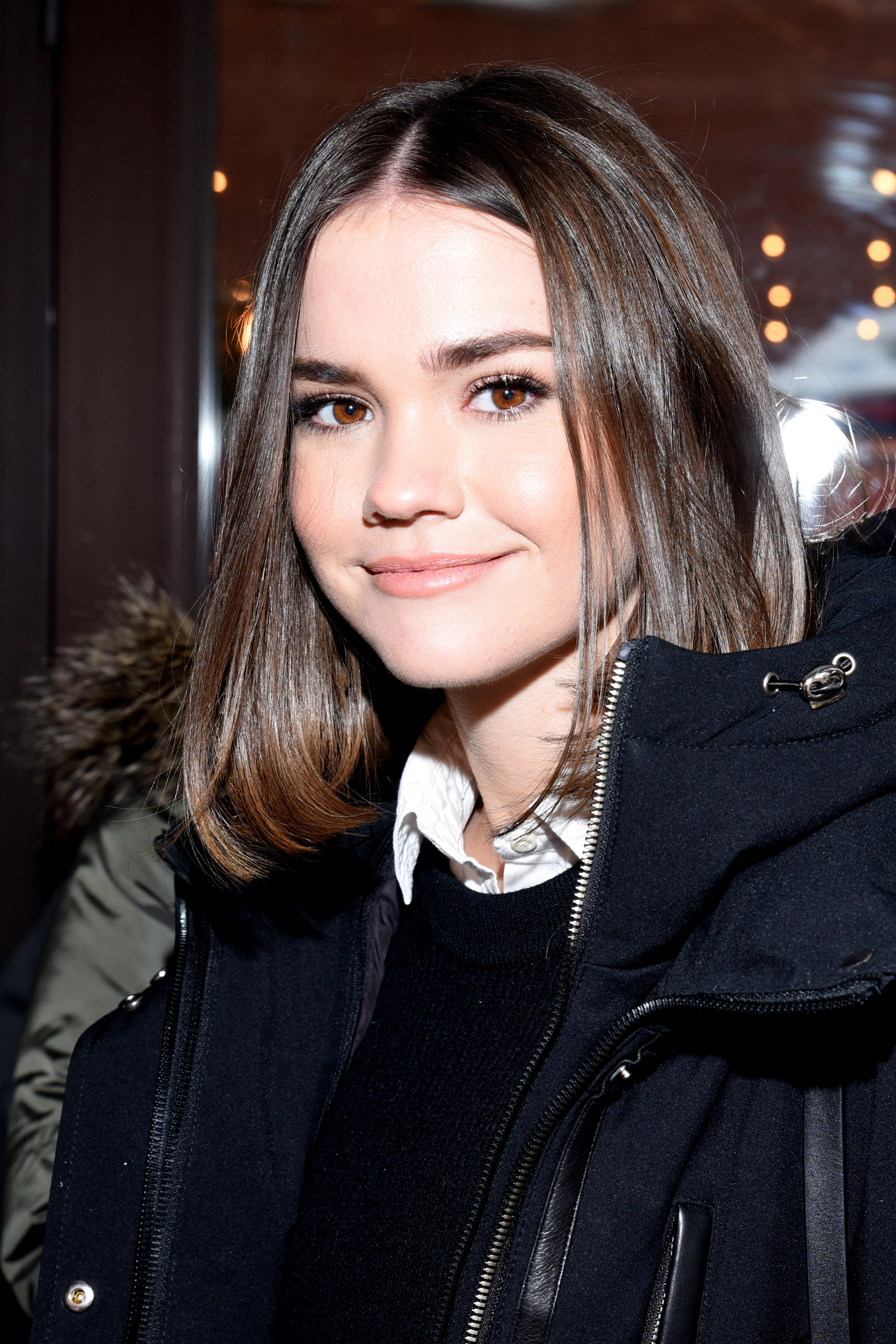
- Mitchell at Sundance Film Festival in 2018
- Born: Maia McCall Mitchell; 18 August 1993 (age 33); Lismore, New South Wales, Australia
- Occupations: Actress; singer
- Years active: 2006–present
- Partner: Rudy Mancuso (2015–2022)

Maia McCall Mitchell (born 18 August 1993) is an Australian actress and singer. She is best known for her role as Callie Adams Foster in the Freeform drama The Fosters (2013–18) and its spin-off series Good Trouble (2019–24). She also co-starred with Ross Lynch in the Disney Channel original films Teen Beach Movie (2013) and Teen Beach 2 (2015) as McKenzie/Mack. For Australian audiences, she played the roles of Brittany Flune in the children's television series Mortified for the Nine Network, and as Natasha Ham in the Seven Network's teen drama Trapped.

== Early life ==
Mitchell was born in Lismore, New South Wales. Her father, Alex, is a taxi driver while her mother, Jill, works in the education system. Mitchell has one younger brother, Charlie. She learned to play guitar at a young age, which has been demonstrated in her film and television work. She attended Trinity Catholic College, Lismore.

== Career ==
=== 2000s: Australian television debut ===
Mitchell first began acting by performing in school plays and local theatre productions. She was discovered by talent agencies and got her big break at age 12, when she was cast as Brittany Flune in the Australian children's television series Mortified. Mortified ended after two seasons and a total of 26 episodes, which ran from 30 June 2006 to 11 April 2007. Due to her success on Mortified, she also starred in the Australian TV series Trapped and its sequel series Castaway as the character Natasha Hamilton. She was also in the TV series K-9, a spin-off of the popular British TV series Doctor Who which focuses on the robot dog K9.

=== 2010s: Breakthrough and American television ===
When Mitchell was 18 years old, she moved to Los Angeles, where she landed a role as recurring character Shaylee Michaels in the Disney Channel TV series Jessie. She then made her film debut by starring as the main character McKenzie "Mack" in the Disney Channel original movie Teen Beach Movie and reprised her role in Teen Beach 2. From 2013 to 2018, she starred in the ABC Family later Freeform drama series The Fosters as Callie Jacob, who would later change names to Callie Adams Foster. During the show's fifth and last season, it was announced that Mitchell and Cierra Ramirez would be spun off into their own series, titled Good Trouble, which premiered in January 2019. She received critical acclaim for her performance in the series, with Brad Newsome of The Sydney Morning Herald calling her "a standout", writing "Young Australian Maia Mitchell is terrific again in this sequel series to The Fosters [...] The hugely likeable Mitchell continues to grow as a perceptive, multi-faceted actor whose best work is yet to come." Mitchell was a main cast member until the second episode of the fourth season, when she chose to return to her native Australia during the 2022 Australian flood crisis, before later returning with guest roles in the fifth season. Mitchell and Ramirez also served as executive producers of Good Trouble.

Also in 2018, she collaborated with Rudy Mancuso for the song "Magic".

=== 2020s: Return from Australia ===
Mitchell returned to Los Angeles in 2023 to rejoin Good Trouble in its fifth season. That year, she also played the leading role of Lady Belle Fox in The Artful Dodger (2023), an eight-episode miniseries made for Disney+. The show follows Jack "Artful Dodger" Dawkins years after the events of Charles Dickens' novel, Oliver Twist (1838). On 21 November 2024, it was announced that the series had been renewed for a second series and Mitchell would return to play Lady Belle Fox.

In 2024, she finished Good Trouble after five seasons. Since the 2022 Australian flood crisis, she has been an advocate for climate change and environmental welfare.

== Personal life ==
In 2022, Mitchell announced that she had temporarily moved back to her native Lismore, Australia, to be with her family amidst the COVID-19 pandemic and the 2022 Australian flood crisis.

From 2015 to early 2022, Mitchell was in a relationship with American internet personality Rudy Mancuso.

== Filmography ==
=== Film ===
Year	Title	Role	Notes
2013	After the Dark	Beatrice	
2017	Hot Summer Nights	Amy Calhoun	
2018	Never Goin' Back	Angela	
2019	The Last Summer	Phoebe Fisher	
2022	No Way Out	Tessa	Also executive producer
2023	Sitting in Bars with Cake	Liz	
2024	Family Secrets		
2025	Until Dawn	Melanie "Mel" Paul / Wendigo	

=== Television ===
Year	Title	Role	Notes
2006–2007	Mortified	Brittany Flune	Main cast
2008–2009	Trapped	Natasha Hamilton	Main cast
2009	K-9	Taphony	Episode: "Taphony and the Time Loop"
2011	Castaway	Natasha Hamilton	Main cast
2011	Zombies and Cheerleaders	Claire	Unsold TV pilot
2013	Teen Beach Movie	McKenzie "Mack"	Disney Channel Original Movie
2013	Phineas and Ferb	Herself	Co-host (UK version only); episode: "Musical Cliptastic Countdown"
2013–2014	Jessie	Shaylee Michaels	2 episodes
2013–2018	The Fosters	Callie Adams Foster	Main cast
2014	Jake and the Never Land Pirates	Wendy Darling	Voice role; episode: "Battle for the Book"
2015	Teen Beach 2	McKenzie "Mack"	Disney Channel Original Movie
2016–2019	The Lion Guard	Jasiri	Recurring voice role
2019–2024	Good Trouble	Callie Adams Foster	60 Episodes Main cast (seasons 1–4), guest (season 5); also executive producer
2023–present	The Artful Dodger	Lady Belle Fox	16 episodes Main cast
2026	NCIS: Sydney	Ally Park	3 episodes

=== Web ===
Year	Title	Role	Notes
2014	The Fosters: Girls United	Callie Adams Foster	5 episodes

=== Music videos ===
Year	Artist	Title	Notes
2019	Hayley Kiyoko	"I Wish"	

== Discography ==
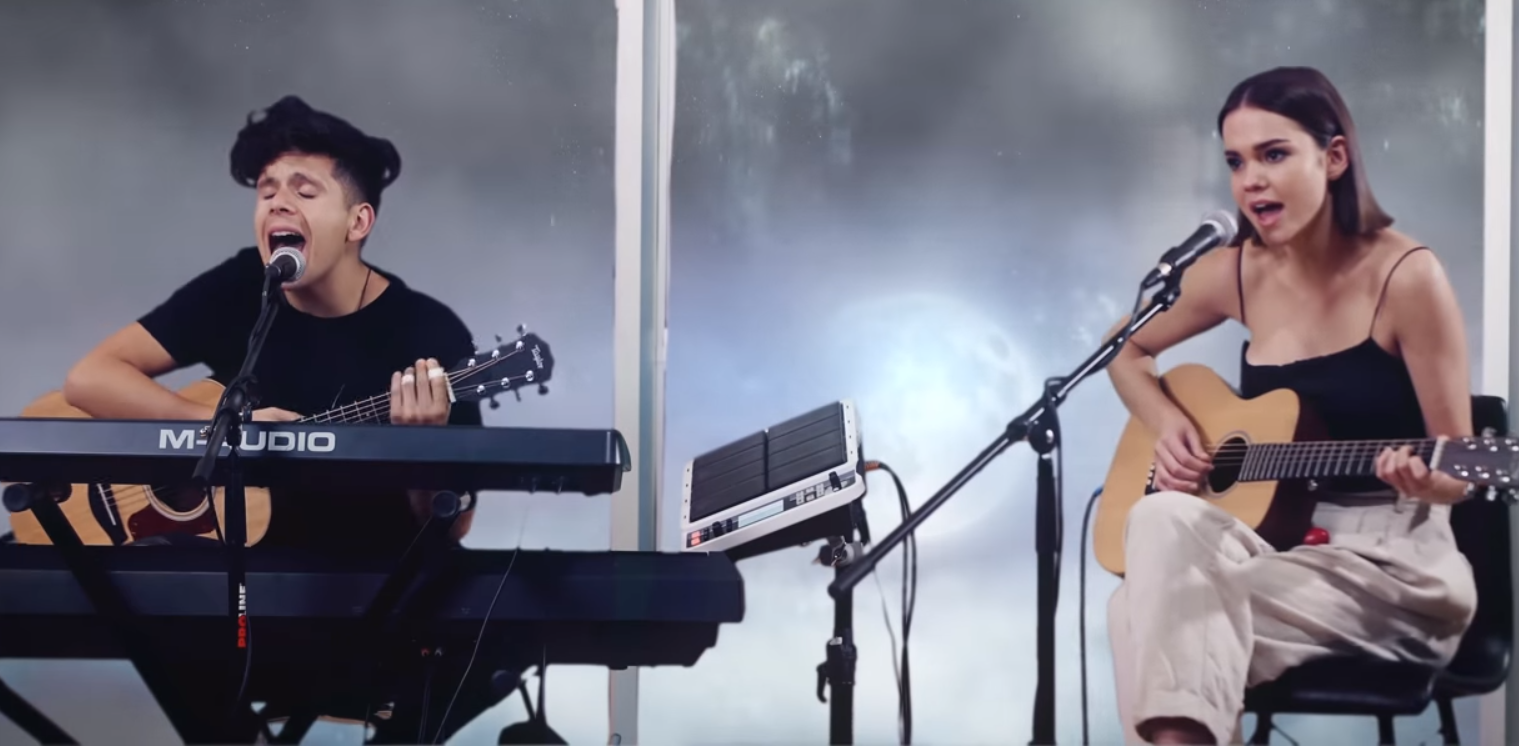
Mitchell performing with Rudy Mancuso in 2018

=== Soundtrack albums ===
List of albums, with selected chart positions
Title	Album details	Peak chart positions								
Title	Album details	US	US OST	BEL	CAN	FRA	NL	NZ	SPA	UK
Teen Beach Movie	Released: 16 July 2013; Formats: CD, digital download; Label: Walt Disney	3	1	176	14	76	56	30	15	36
Teen Beach 2	Released: 23 June 2015; Formats: CD, digital download; Label: Walt Disney	10	1	—	—	129	—	—	67	—
"—" denotes releases that did not chart or were not released in that territory.

=== Charted songs ===
List of singles, with selected chart positions
Year	Title	Peak positions			Album
Year	Title	US	IRL	UK	Album
2013	"Like Me" (with Ross Lynch, Grace Phipps & Spencer Lee)	101	—	177	Teen Beach Movie
2013	"Can't Stop Singing" (with Ross Lynch)	—	—	200	Teen Beach Movie
"—" denotes releases that did not chart or were not released in that territory.

== Awards and nominations ==
Association	Year	Category	Work	Result	Ref.
Teen Choice Awards	2013	Choice Summer TV Star: Female	The Fosters	Nominated	
Teen Choice Awards	2014	Choice TV Actress: Drama	The Fosters	Nominated	
Teen Choice Awards	2015	Choice TV Actress: Drama	The Fosters	Nominated	
Teen Choice Awards	2015	Choice Summer TV Star: Female	Teen Beach 2	Nominated	
Teen Choice Awards	2016	Choice TV Actress: Drama	The Fosters	Nominated	
Teen Choice Awards	2017	Choice Summer TV Star: Female	The Fosters	Nominated	
Teen Choice Awards	2019	Choice Drama TV Actress	Good Trouble	Nominated	
Teen Choice Awards	2019	Choice Summer Movie Actress	The Last Summer	Nominated	
