= Murder She Purred: A Mrs. Murphy Mystery =

- VHS cover
- Based on: "Mrs. Murphy" series by Rita Mae Brown
- Screenplay by: Ann Lewis Hamilton; Jim Cox
- Story by: Ann Lewis Hamilton
- Directed by: Simon Wincer
- Starring: Ricki Lake; Linden Ashby; Bruce McGill; Christina Pickles; Judith Scott; Kari Coleman; Blythe Danner (Voice); Anthony Clark (Voice); Edie McClurg; Ed Begley Jr.
- Music by: Eric Colvin
- Country of origin: United States
- Original language: English

Production
- Producer: Kevin Inch
- Cinematography: David Burr
- Editor: Terry Blythe
- Running time: 88 minutes
- Production companies: Ancient Mariner Films; Walt Disney Television

Original release
- Network: ABC
- Release: December 13, 1998

Murder She Purred: A Mrs. Murphy Mystery is a 1998 TV movie that is a light-hearted murder mystery with animal actors playing leading roles. It was based on Rita Mae Brown's novel series featuring a cat named Mrs. Murphy. The title is a nod to the famous television series, Murder She Wrote.

Murder She Purred stars Blythe Danner voicing the title character, Mrs. Murphy, a gray tabby cat. Anthony Clark co-stars, voicing her sidekick Tucker, a Pembroke Welsh Corgi dog. Ricki Lake plays their owner, Mary Minor "Harry" Haristeen.

It was directed by Simon Wincer. Filmed in Ontario, Canada, it aired as part of the anthology series on ABC's The Wonderful World of Disney. It aired on ABC on December 13, 1998.

== Plot ==
Mrs. Murphy (a cat) and Tucker (a dog) join forces to investigate their new neighbor whom they believe had committed a crime.

They belong to Mary Minor "Harry" Haristeen.who people call by the nickname Harry, using the first part of her last name.

Here are a few quotes from the film.

"The plot thickens," says Mrs. Murphy.

Tucker asks, "What's Harry having for lunch?" Mrs. Murphy replies, "Tuna fish -- with WAY too much mustard."

Tucker thinks the two big German shepherd dogs chase him because he has short legs. Mrs. Murphy tells Tucker, “They don't pick on you because you're short, Tucker, they pick on you because you act short. You're only as small as you think you are. You want to be a big dog? You have to act like a big dog. Think tall.

Tucker says, “I just don't think I'm that good of an actor."

The heroic theme music from Chariots of Fire plays in the background when Tucker courageously jumps through the air -- first, when he knocks a gun away, and then, when he makes the two German shepherds get out of the cat's way. Mrs. Murphy thanks Tucker with a nudge, saying, "that's for being the biggest dog I know.”

== Cast ==
- Ricki Lake as Mary Minor 'Harry' Haristeen
- Linden Ashby as Dr. Blair Bainbridge
- Bruce McGill as Sheriff Rick
- Christina Pickles as Mim Sanburne
- Judith Scott as Coop
- Kari Coleman as Susan
- Blythe Danner as Mrs. Murphy the Gray Domestic Shorthair Tabby (Voice)
- Anthony Clark as Tucker the Pembroke Welsh Corgi (Voice)
- Edie McClurg as Miranda Hoggendobber
- Ed Begley Jr. as Fitz-Gilbert Hamilton

Blythe Danner was the voice of Mrs. Murphy the cat, a gray domestic shorthair tabby. Anthony Clark was the voice of Tucker the dog, a Pembroke Welsh corgi.

The animals and their wrangler/handler/trainer Sherri Davis were uncredited in spite of their having leading roles. Canadian animal trainer Sherri Davis of BRB K9 Services trained and handled two dogs, two cats, and a mouse in Murder She Purred: A Mrs. Murphy Mystery. Her career in television and film includes the beloved TV series Hudson & Rex, Sue Thomas: F.B.Eye, Murdoch Mysteries, Relic Hunter, Nero Wolfe, and the film, Lucky Dog.

A cute black kitten named Snowball speaks a line at the end of the film. Two lines of the final credits say, “Animals provided by Birds & Animals Unlimited," and “Animals Coordinator Cheryl Harris". Other credits of Cheryl Ann Harris Couzens include: Steel Magnolias, Doctor Dolittle, Touched by an Angel, Wonder Woman, The Bionic Woman, The Six Million Dollar Man, and General Hospital.

== Reception ==
The movie critic site, Rotten Tomatoes applauded the film with a good review and a 75% approval rating. Michael Dequina of TheMovieReport.com wrote in Rotten Tomatoes, “If you adore the sight of cute animals spouting cutesy voiced-over dialogue and doing cutesy things such as, say, investigating a murder, then by all means go and check it out.”

Ray Richmond from Variety magazine did not like the film and gave it a bad review, stating, "This installment of The Wonderful World of Disney, based on the 'Mrs. Murphy' series of mystery novels penned by Rita Mae Brown, is pretty much as dumb as it gets, giving us a dog and a cat who solve crimes (Mrs. Murphy is the cat) and a starring role for Ricki Lake that makes her lowbrow daytime yakfest seem like 'Frontline' by comparison. Disney has been reduced to ripping off itself — or didn't anyone see 'Homeward Bound' and its sequel?".

Writing in Cat Tribune, a reviewer described the film as worth watching, praising the convincing performances of the animal cast, the effectiveness of the training and the entertainment value of the animals' unexpected behaviour.
