= The Fosters (American TV series) =

American family drama TV series

- Genre: Family drama; Teen drama
- Created by: Bradley Bredeweg; Peter Paige
- Showrunners: Bradley Bredeweg; Peter Paige; Joanna Johnson
- Starring: Teri Polo; Sherri Saum; Jake T. Austin; Hayden Byerly; David Lambert; Maia Mitchell; Danny Nucci; Cierra Ramirez; Noah Centineo
- Theme music composer: Kari Kimmel
- Opening theme: "Where You Belong" by Kari Kimmel
- Ending theme: "Where You Belong" (instrumental)
- Composers: Alec Puro; Michael Brook
- Country of origin: United States
- Original language: English
- No. of seasons: 5
- No. of episodes: 104 (list of episodes)

Production
- Executive producers: Peter Paige; Bradley Bredeweg; Greg Gugliotta; Jennifer Lopez; Simon Fields; Benny Medina; John Ziffren; Joanna Johnson; Elaine Goldsmith-Thomas
- Producers: Christine A. Sacani; Paul Sciarrotta; David Hartle; Mark Benton Johnson; Megan Lynn; Wade Solomon
- Cinematography: Lowell Peterson; Kees Van Oostrum; Checco Varese
- Editors: Kristin Windell; Sharon Silverman; Debra Weinstein; Michael Jablow; Meghan Robertson
- Running time: 42 minutes
- Production companies: ProdCo Original; Blazing Elm Entertainment; Nuyorican Productions

Original release
- Network: Freeform
- Release: June 3, 2013 – June 6, 2018

Related
- Good Trouble

The Fosters is an American family drama television series created by Peter Paige and Bradley Bredeweg. It premiered in the United States on June 3, 2013, on the ABC Family (later Freeform) television network and concluded on June 6, 2018. It follows the lives of the Adams-Foster family led by a lesbian couple, Stef Foster, a police officer, and Lena Adams, a school vice principal, who raise one biological son and four adopted teenagers in San Diego, California.

The first season received generally favorable reviews and particular acclaim for its portrayal of LGBT themes. It also earned two GLAAD Media Awards and one Teen Choice Award.

On January 3, 2018, Freeform announced that The Fosters would end after five seasons. It concluded with a three-episode finale, which also acted as an introduction to Good Trouble, the spin-off series starring Maia Mitchell and Cierra Ramirez.

== Plot ==
This five season series follows the lives of the Adams Foster family who live in San Diego. The matriarchal heads of this family are police officer Stef Foster and her life partner Lena Adams, a school vice principal. Their multiethnic, blended family includes Brandon, Stef's biological son from her previous marriage, and twins Jesus and Mariana, who were adopted as children. The series begins when the couple take in two foster children, siblings Callie and Jude Jacobs, whom they later adopt. The five children have rough times navigating adolescence because of poor life choices.

Also part of their lives is Mike Foster, Stef's patrol partner and ex-husband, and Brandon's biological father.

Most of the show takes place at the family's craftsman-style home in the quiet San Diego suburb of Mission Bay and at Anchor Beach Community Charter School.

== Episodes ==
Series overview
Season	Episodes		Originally released		
Season	Episodes		First released	Last released	Network
1	21		June 3, 2013	March 24, 2014	ABC Family
2	21		June 16, 2014	March 23, 2015	ABC Family
3	20	10	June 8, 2015	August 17, 2015	ABC Family
3	20	10	January 25, 2016	March 28, 2016	Freeform
4	20		June 20, 2016	April 11, 2017	Freeform
5	22		July 11, 2017	June 6, 2018	Freeform

== Characters ==
=== Main ===
- Stef Adams Foster (Teri Polo) is Lena's wife, Brandon's biological mother, and the adoptive mother to twins Jesus and Mariana. In the pilot episode, she and Lena also foster Callie Jacob, and later her younger maternal half-brother Jude, whom they will subsequently adopt. Stef is a police officer for the San Diego Police Department, where she works as a patrol partner with Brandon's biological father and her ex-husband, Mike. She is known for having a strong personality with bold opinions but can also be loving and motherly. When Jesus goes missing one night, Mariana informs her parents how she fears Jesus is at their biological mother Ana's house since they recently got in contact and have been lending her money. Stef and Mike go to rescue Jesus only to discover that he is not there, and Ana's boyfriend, an abusive drug addict, shoots Stef, who is severely wounded before making a full recovery. Later, she officially marries Lena, and after having a mammogram, Stef receives a diagnosis of intraductal carcinoma. Because it is likely that the cells will become cancerous, she undergoes surgery.
- Lena Adams Foster (Sherri Saum) is Stef's wife, step-mother to Brandon, and adoptive mother to Jesus and Mariana. In the pilot episode, she and Lena also foster Callie Jacob, and later her younger maternal half-brother Jude, whom they will subsequently adopt. Lena is the vice principal of Anchor Beach Community Charter School, the high school her children attend. She tends to be more open and reasonable, oftentimes when it comes to the children's wrongdoings but can be stern as well. She and Stef legally marry, and the discussion of Lena carrying her first child arises. Lena interviews for a promotion at work and reveals she is pregnant, leading the panel to question her ability to balance work and home. She later develops Pre-eclampsia, which leads to a miscarriage.
- Callie Adams Foster (formerly Callie Quinn Jacob) (Maia Mitchell) is the adoptive daughter of Stef and Lena, adoptive sister to Brandon, Mariana, and Jesus, and maternal half-sister to Jude. In the pilot episode, the court places Callie in the Adams Foster home after serving time in juvenile detention for damaging her abusive foster father's property. Later, with Brandon's help, she goes to get her younger half-brother Jude (then believed to be her brother), who is still in the abusive foster home. Callie quickly develops a crush on Brandon before Jude becomes furious at her after seeing them kiss at Stef and Lena's wedding. Fearing the court will place her back into foster care, Callie attempts to run away, where she ends up eating food at a gas station without paying. This leads her into a temporary group home to counsel her actions and keep her away from Brandon. As time passes, Callie and Brandon hold back their feelings for each other. Callie's adoption is initially put on hold after the discovery that she and Jude do not share the same birth father. Later, Robert Quinn, who reveals himself to be Callie's birth father, approaches Callie. Robert introduces her to his family, and she quickly bonds with his daughter, Sophia. After Robert feels ready to turn over his paternal rights, Sophia tears up the paperwork, hoping Callie feels the same way about their newfound sibling bond, which appears to be the exact opposite. Stef and Lena officially adopt her following a prolonged battle with the justice system and a passionate speech to the judge.
- Mariana Adams Foster (Cierra Ramirez) is Stef and Lena's adoptive daughter, Jesus' twin sister, younger adoptive sister to Brandon and Callie, and Jude's older adoptive sister. Mariana is an intelligent teenage girl who likes to involve herself in whatever she finds enjoyable, particularly when she is social with her friends and gossips at school. She is also very proficient at coding and mathematics. Like many teenage girls, Mariana struggles with her self-confidence, heritage, and appearance, as seen when she dyes her hair blond to fit in. She dances, acts, sings, and eventually forms her own dance team before becoming the lead actress in Brandon's senior project musical. Mariana initially supports her birth mother financially by selling Jesus' ADHD medication at school. Jesus confronts their birth mom to no longer contact Mariana, only to also rope in Brandon, which causes him financial and physical harm, for which she is apologetic. Later, Mariana hopes to change her image, joins the dance team, and takes a liking toward one of Brandon's bandmates. She is very close to Jesus, but they often tease each other.
- Jesus Adams Foster (Jake T. Austin in seasons 1–2, Noah Centineo in seasons 3–5) is Stef and Lena's adoptive son, twin brother to Mariana, and adoptive sibling to Brandon, Callie, and Jude. He has ADHD and joins the wrestling team in an effort to offset the negative effects of his medication through the advice of Mike. Jesus loves his twin sister, Mariana, and the pair share resentment toward their biological mother. He is a womanizer at first, having a short string of romantic relationships and sometimes charming his mothers, including when he covers up for Mariana's wrongdoings. But he is now more respectful after getting back together with Emma. Jesus feels as though he has no involvement in Mariana's quinceañera preparations but later opts to be her escort in an effort to be at their birthday celebration. In the third season, Jesus temporarily resides at a boarding school for his high school wrestling team but returns after Callie's adoption. After he admits to his parents that he was taking steroids while away at boarding school, Stef and Lena no longer allow Jesus to participate on the wrestling team at Anchor Beach. Jesus later suffers a TBI after accidentally shooting himself in the head with a nail gun, which affects his personality and his academic performance.
- Jude Adams Foster (formerly Jude Jacob) (Hayden Byerly) is the youngest Adams Foster child, he is Callie's half brother, and he is also Brandon, Jesus, and Mariana's adoptive sibling. Callie rescues Jude from their abusive foster father's house. As Jude settles into his new home, Mariana paints his nails blue and Callie tells him to wash it off but then learns to accept Jude's choices. At school, he quickly becomes friends with a kind-hearted boy, Connor, and as their friendship grows, Jude begins questioning his sexual orientation. When Connor's father suspects Jude's feelings, he forbids the boys from seeing each other outside of school. Jude slips into a phase of selective mutism, a social anxiety disorder where he does not speak entirely for a certain extent of time in fear of embarrassment, only to finally open up to Callie about his feelings. Jude and Connor kiss and begin dating, but Jude refuses to label himself as gay. After seeing how badly this affects Connor at an LGBTQ dance in season 3, he comes out as gay. At the end of the first season, Stef and Lena legally adopt Jude. Following Callie's own adoption, Jude admits he is in love with Connor, who returns the sentiment. After Connor moves to Los Angeles to live with his mom and because their long-distance relationship does not work out very well, they break up, and he later dates a new friend, Noah. Jude finally graduates from ABCC and gets into the College of Arts and Letters, UCLA. He and Noah maintain their relationship throughout their high school years, but break up when Noah goes to university, although they remain good friends.
- Brandon Foster (David Lambert) is the eldest Foster child, biological son of Stef and Mike, and older adoptive brother to Jesus and Mariana, as well as to Callie and Jude. Brandon has an infatuation for Callie but after his biological mother and father place a restraining order against him, and despite he and Callie having sex the night before her adoption, they later resist further temptations to proceed with their relationship. Brandon also has a talent for music, excelling in piano, and is on the verge of entering a highly distinguished music program. After raising money to obtain fake IDs to get into a bar (as he is legally underage), Brandon is beat up by his dealer. Following his subsequent hospitalization, Brandon loses sensation in his hand, causing him to miss his spot in the music program. Still able to play the piano, he joins a band. In the third season, Brandon goes to the Idylwild band camp and competes to play at Disney Hall, where he wins the competition. During his senior year of high school, he receives an acceptance letter into The Juilliard School, his top choice in colleges and among the most prestigious in music and the arts. Later, however, Brandon is academically dismissed from ever attending college as a student discloses bribing Brandon to take his scholastic assessment test.
- Mike Foster (Danny Nucci) is Stef's patrol partner and ex-husband as well as Brandon's father. He makes a number of appearances in the Adams Foster home, especially when it involves seeing Brandon. When searching for Jesus in the twins' birth mother's home, Mike witnesses Ana's boyfriend shooting Stef and, in turn, Mike fires at the shooter. Mike hadn't noticed the shooter dropped the gun and still shot him, which Stef witnessed, forcing her to hide the truth to protect Mike. He later learns that the money he gives his son for piano lessons is used to bribe Ana to lie in court so Mike does not lose his job. This only complicates the issue as the court abruptly determines that Mike is not guilty before Ana even has the chance to testify. Mike is also a recovering alcoholic, attends Alcoholics Anonymous meetings, and retains a live-in girlfriend, Dani, who helps maintain his sobriety. The pair break up when she is sent to prison for statutory rape with an already sober Brandon. Mike and Ana soon begin a romantic relationship and get engaged in season 5 and the two got married during the time jump; he also becomes the step-father of Bella. Mike was also the foster father to AJ Hensdale.

=== Recurring ===
- Daphne Keene (Daffany Clark) is Callie's close friend who she meets in juvie and later lives with at Girls' United. She begins working for Justina, the investor in Fost and Found, to win back custody of her daughter.
- Timothy (Jay Ali) is a teacher, who is quite popular among his students at Anchor Beach Community Charter School.
- Ana Gutierrez (Alexandra Barreto) is Jesus and Mariana's biological mother, and a member of AA. In the first season, Ana initially bribes Jesus and Mariana for money. She later dates Mike and also gives birth to a daughter, Isabella, during the third season and becomes engaged to Mike in season five.
- Dana Adams (Lorraine Toussaint) is Lena's mother.
- Stewart Adams (Stephen Collins in Season 1, Bruce Davison in Season 3) is Lena's father.
- Emma Kurtzman (Amanda Leighton) is a member of the wrestling and STEM teams with Mariana. She becomes Jesus' girlfriend before they break up but are reconciled in season 3.
- Sophia Quinn (Bailee Madison) is Callie's biological younger half-sister. Sophia clings on to Callie as though they are really close despite only meeting each other recently, even acting out after Callie makes it clear to her and her family that she does not want to live with them. After she attempts suicide and goes to counseling, Sophia's parents discover that she has a personality disorder, which her father discloses to Callie.
- Mat Tan (Jordan Rodrigues) is a founding member of Someone's Little Sister. Since the second season, he and Mariana have been dating each other only to find themselves constantly breaking up and getting back together again.
- Monte Porter (Annika Marks) is the principal of Anchor Beach Community Charter School. Monte is divorced and in Lena's office at school, she briefly kisses Lena. By the third season, Monte begins dating Jenna after revealing that she is reevaluating her sexual orientation.
- Taylor (Izabela Vidovic) is Jude's friend and classmate.
- AJ Hensdale (Tom Williamson) is an adolescent boy whom Mike is potentially expecting to adopt, but Mike initially has Stef and Lena foster him for a short while. While staying over the Adams Foster household, AJ and Callie start dating and they later kiss before he runs away with his brother, Ty, as the latter commits a crime. This only leads to AJ being sent to juvie while his brother goes under arrest. Following his release from juvie (as the court determines his brother is not guilty), he and Callie continue with their relationship.
- Cortney Strathmore (Denyse Tontz) is Brandon's ex-girlfriend, and is three years his senior. She also has a very young son and is going through a divorce so Brandon lived with Cortney and helped pay off her house rent.
- Nick Stratos (Louis Hunter) is Jesus' friend and Mariana's unstable boyfriend. In the fourth season, Stef and Mike discover that Nick had set the warehouse on fire, and then they realize that he has fled from school with his father's gun; the school subsequently goes on lockdown. When Callie finds him holding Mariana hostage in her bed the next morning, Stef has him sent to prison. Following Nick's release from a psychiatric hospital, the court places a restraining order on him. However, during the neighborhood's celebration for Callie potentially passing her new foster care bill, Mariana sees Nick walking in the crowd without realizing that she is only hallucinating, a side effect resulting from taking Jesus's ADHD medication. Fearing her safety is at risk, she subsequently calls Jesus before running away. Jesus then contacts Nick, who is alone at his house, demanding that he release Mariana but Nick makes it clear that he is not with her. Not believing him, Jesus goes searching for Nick, where he later finds him having an argument with Mariana. Acting on impulse, Jesus attempts to beat him up only to find himself being attacked to the ground, which is when Stef abruptly appears trying to stop their fight. Nick then provides Jesus with a blow to the head before he immediately loses consciousness.
- Gabriel "Gabe" Duncroft (Brandon Quinn) is Jesus and Mariana's biological father, who is on a sex offenders list for being 18 when dating only 15-year-old Ana. At the time, her parents filed a restraining order against him, which led to his subsequent arrest. Years later, Jesus meets Gabe while helping him on a construction site without initially disclosing that he is his son. Gabe later assists Brandon in setting up his school musical, but after the board of directors at Anchor Beach learn about Gabe's background, Lena is at risk of losing her job so she, alongside Stef, Mike, and a lawyer help remove Gabe off the list.
- Aaron Baker (Elliot Fletcher) is a law student who helps Callie release her younger ex-foster brother out of jail as the latter has been falsely accused of murdering an elderly woman that he had worked for. He later reveals he is transgender and becomes Callie's boyfriend in season five.
- Noah (Kalama Epstein) is Jude's second boyfriend whom he meets at Taylor's church youth group. After Jude discovers that Noah has marijuana to help him with his anxiety, he convinces Jude to eat his medical marijuana gummy worms with him and they later find themselves smoking marijuana frequently to get high together. However, after the two are caught smoking it one night in the family's garage, Stef and Lena forbid Jude from seeing Noah again. Stef and Lena later encourage the relationship because of how much Jude is affected by Callie going to jail.
- Grace (Meg DeLacy) is Brandon's girlfriend. She volunteers at the hospital, where she uses music therapy for children with autism. Grace is diagnosed with leukemia and undergoes chemotherapy, which is unsuccessful. She becomes mad after finding out that her mother discloses her condition to Brandon. She becomes irritated after her mother restricts her from having sex with Brandon.
- Rita Hendricks (Rosie O'Donnell) is the leader of Girls United – a group home for troubled girls – who befriends Callie.
- Jack Downey (Tanner Buchanan) is a socially inept teenager, who befriends Jude after meeting him at a foster youth event where Callie was a speaker. Jack later catfishes Callie by pretending to be AJ and ends up kissing Jude because he wanted to make him feel better, however he later tells Callie he is not gay. Callie and Jude's previous abusive foster father beats Jack to death after Jack's attempt to call a police operator for help.
- Justina Marks (Kelli Williams) is the lobbyist whom Callie initially collaborates with on a bill that will repair the issues currently facing foster care legislation in the state. After realizing the intent of the bill, which privatizes foster care, is to only worsen things for the sake of Justina and her company earning a profit, Callie takes a photo online of the check Justina receives in the mail in her office at work so this becomes visibly known to the public. Callie, then, decides to compete against Justina by designing her own bill that will genuinely improve the lives of those in foster care. Nonetheless, in the midst of Callie's celebration party, one of Justina's workers informs Callie that if she goes through on passing her bill, Justina will have Callie sent to prison by disclosing to the police how she read through her mail, thereby allowing her own bill to gain approval instead.
- Talya Banks (Madisen Beaty) is Brandon's initial girlfriend; they break up after she discovers his feelings for Callie.
- Lexi Rivera (Bianca A. Santos) is Mariana's best friend, and Jesus' girlfriend. Lexi moves to Honduras before residing back in San Diego after she and her family get their visas. When returning to Anchor Beach, Lexi finds out that while she was away, Emma was on the wrestling team where she met and later started dating Jesus. Lexi later reads the email that Jesus sent to her, leading to Lexi breaking up with him.
- Wyatt (Alex Saxon) is Callie's first boyfriend, with whom she runs away. He later returns during the second and third season before they break up. He starts to date Mariana a couple of days or months after he took her virginity while she was dating Mat. He appears in season five being toyed by Mariana in a few episodes.
- Connor Stevens (Gavin MacIntosh) is Jude's best friend, classmate and first boyfriend. The two have problems in their relationship, mostly due to Connor's homophobic father and Jude's refusal to label himself as gay, but they work through them. In season 3, Connor and Jude admit they love each other but the pair break up after struggling to maintain a long-distance relationship following Connor's permanent move to his mother's house in Los Angeles.
- Frank Cooper (Sam McMurray) is Stef's father, who is not fond of his daughter's sexual orientation. Despite being homophobic, Frank decides to attend Stef's wedding but she disinvites him the night before marrying Lena. A few days later, Stef finds him dead on the couch at her parents' house only to later regret missing out on potentially relieving the tensions she had with her father.
- Kiara (Cherinda Kincherlow) is one of Callie's friends from Girls' United.
- Cole (Tom Phelan) is a transgender boy from Girls' United, who Callie escorts to prom.
- Dani (Danielle) Kirkland (Marla Sokoloff) is Mike's girlfriend whom he met at AA. Brandon, later, discloses to his parents and step-mother that after returning to his father's house drunk one night, Dani took advantage of and had sex with him. The next morning, Mike has broken up with her, the police came to arrest Dani at Mike's house for statutory rape.
- Donald Jacob (Jamie McShane) is Jude's biological father who initially raised Callie and Jude with their late mother. One night, however, he drove drunk with his wife in the car before getting into an accident which killed her instantly. He was subsequently arrested for quite some time so Callie and Jude ended up in the foster care system. Donald later signs the papers in court that would allow Stef and Lena to adopt Jude.
- Hayley Heinz (Caitlin Carver) is Jesus's second girlfriend and a member of the school dance team. Before the pair break up, Jesus tattoos her name on the side of his chest, and after their split, his parents find out about his tattoo and have him laser it off.
- Robert Quinn (Kerr Smith) is Callie's biological father. It was not until the court discovers his name on Callie's birth certificate that they realized Robert—not Donald—was her biological father. Against Callie's wishes, Robert initially fights for her custody before realizing that it would not be in Callie's best interest, and instead gives up his parental rights to Stef and Lena.
- Adam Stevens (Chris Bruno) is Connor's abusive and homophobic father. He finds Connor's homosexuality uneasy to bear and disapproves of his son's relationship with Jude.
- Lucy "Lou" Chan (Ashley Argota) is Brandon's former love interest, and a member of the band Someone's Little Sister.

=== Special guest stars ===
- Sharon Elkin (Annie Potts) is Stef's mother, and the Foster children's grandmother.
- Robert Quinn Sr. (Patrick Duffy) is Callie's biological paternal grandfather.
- Will (Rob Morrow) is Sharon's partner, whom she met on the road. They become engaged and almost marry in season five.

== Production ==
=== Conception ===
The Fosters was originally conceived by openly gay creators Bradley Bredeweg and Peter Paige who wanted to write a drama that reflected the "modern American family". After originally considering a story about two gay fathers, the pair decided the subject of two men raising a family had already been done on television and began to instead consider a story about two women. When asked about the concept of two lesbian mothers raising a blended family, Bredeweg stated, "We realized that there was a kind of a vacuum when it came to stories about women raising families. So we set off in that direction. Many of our own friends are moms raising biological kids. Some of them have fostered and adopted. Suddenly, we realized that we had a story here that hadn't been told on television before." Additionally, certain elements of the series which deal with the foster care system are said to have been inspired by a troubled childhood friend of Bredeweg, who struggled in the foster system before eventually being adopted in her senior year of high school.

=== Development ===
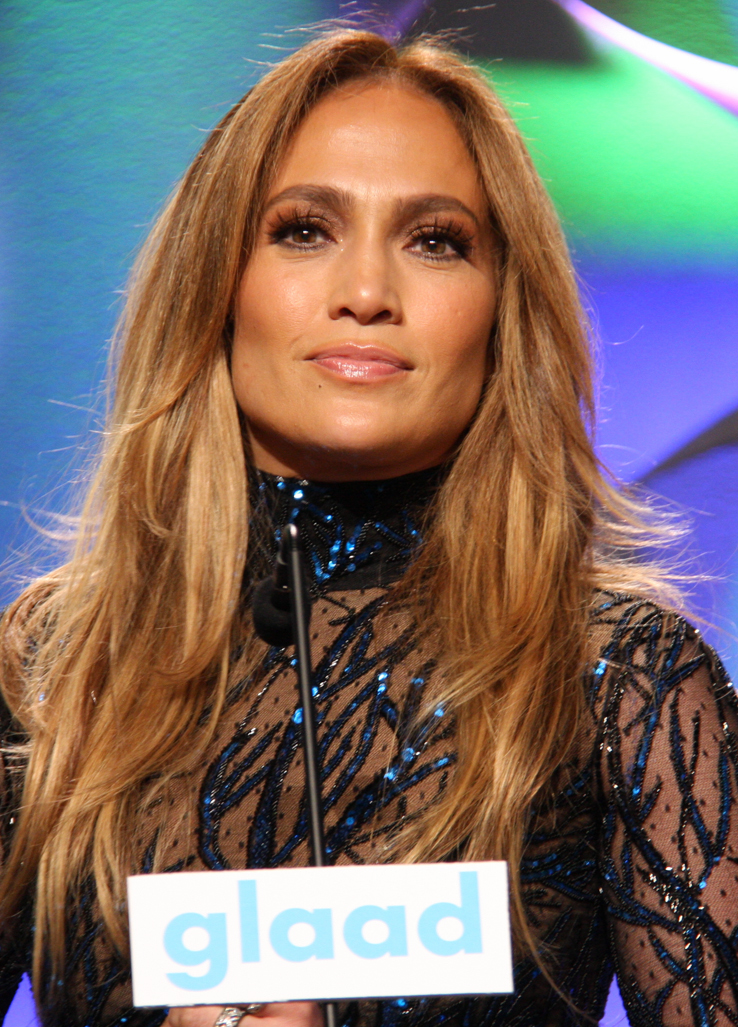
Executive producer Jennifer Lopez

When developing the concept, Bredeweg and Paige were initially met with some resistance from Hollywood, with Bredeweg recounting, "[T]here were some people around us, some people in town who said, 'You know, it is just not going to happen. You are never going to sell this show.'" After completing the first draft of the pilot script, the team was introduced to Jennifer Lopez through a friend who worked at her production company Nuyorican Productions, which was looking to branch out into scripted television. When describing their initial pitch to Lopez, Bredeweg stated, "When we met with Jennifer, she really fell in love with it. The moment we had her, we knew that we had a force behind us."

Lopez's decision to become involved in the project is said to have been largely inspired by her late Aunt Marisa, Lopez's mother's gay elder sister who had faced discrimination during her lifetime due to her sexual orientation and was unable to have a family of her own. When discussing the show's concept, Lopez stated, "Although [the script] was about a non-traditional family and had some newer themes, it had some really basic themes as well about family and love and what's really important. And life can be complicated and messy sometimes and not simple. It gives a really good depiction of family in this day and age."

With Lopez on board, the team took the concept to several networks, including ABC Family, with Bredeweg recalling, "ABC Family was really receptive from the very beginning. Strangely, it felt a little like a match made in heaven. I mean, their slogan is 'A new kind of family.' We had a new kind of modern family, and it took off from there." On July 6, 2012, The Hollywood Reporter, among other sources, reported that Jennifer Lopez and her production company, Nuyorican Productions, were developing the yet-to-be-titled hour-long drama for ABC Family, with Lopez set to executive produce alongside Simon Fields and Greg Gugliotta, as well as showrunners and head writers Peter Paige and Brad Bredeweg.

Finally, the first televised promo appeared on ABC Family on April 19, 2013.

=== Casting ===
On August 23, 2012, sources reported that ABC Family had ordered a pilot for The Fosters, a series which would tell the story of a lesbian couple raising a "21st-century" multi-ethnic mix of foster and biological children. On September 24, 2012, it was reported that Teri Polo and Sherri Saum had been cast to star in the pilot as the two leads, Stef Adams Foster and Lena Adams Foster, respectively. It is worth noting that neither are openly members of the LGBTQ+ community.

On February 6, 2013, it was reported that ABC Family had picked up the show, with production set to begin that spring for a summer 2013 premiere. The rest of the principal cast was also announced at that time, including Danny Nucci as Stef's ex-husband Mike Foster, David Lambert as their biological son Brandon Foster, Jake T. Austin and Cierra Ramirez as Stef and Lena's twins Jesus and Mariana Foster, and Maia Mitchell and Hayden Byerly as their foster children Callie and Jude Jacob.

When recounting the casting process, Bredeweg explained, "[W]e spent tireless hours trying to find the right person for each role. Then they all began to line up—it was like dominos—the moment we found our Lena, the moment we found our Callie, the moment we found our Stef, it sort of all started to line up perfectly for us." On April 11, 2013, TV Guide unveiled the first official cast photo of The Fosters.

In March 2015, it was announced that Jake T. Austin would be leaving the show. He tweeted: "I'm honored to have been a part of such a groundbreaking series, but I personally want to let you know that my time on the show has come to an end. Thank you for letting me be a part of your family, it's been a pleasure." It was announced three months later that Noah Centineo would replace Austin in the role of Jesus.

== Broadcast ==
The Fosters premiered on June 3, 2013, and ran for ten episodes. On July 30, 2013, the series was picked up for a full season and an additional eleven episodes were produced, with the first season returning on January 13, 2014, before concluding on March 24. On October 11, 2013, ABC Family renewed The Fosters for a second season that premiered on June 16, 2014. The summer finale premiered on August 18, 2014. In July, ABC Family announced a Christmas special to premiere in December with the second half of season 2 to premiere in January 2015. The third season premiered on June 8, 2015.

On January 13, 2015, ABC Family renewed the series for a third season which premiered on June 8, with the second half set to premiere on January 18, 2016, on Freeform. On November 24, 2015, the premiere date was pushed to a week later on January 25, 2016. On November 30, 2015, ABC Family announced that The Fosters was renewed for a fourth season and began airing on June 20, 2016.

While Canada broadcasts the series on ABC Spark, it airs on Fox8 in Australia where its second season premiered on February 3, 2015. In Turkey, the series airs on Dizimax Drama.

On January 10, 2017, The Fosters was renewed for a fifth season, which included the series' 100th episode.

On January 3, 2018, Freeform announced that The Fosters was ending after five seasons. The show's two-hour 100th episode acted as a Season 5 finale, setting up the three-part limited series event that aired in June 2018. The three-episode finale will introduce a spin-off series centered around Maia Mitchell's Callie and Cierra Ramirez's Mariana.

=== Webisodes ===
On January 27, 2014, it was confirmed that ABC Family green-lighted a spin-off digital series of The Fosters, named The Fosters: Girls United. The five-part web series follows the residents of the Girls United home in a new country. Maia Mitchell, Daffany Clark, Cherinda Kincherlow, Annamarie Kenoyer, Alicia Sixtos, Hayley Kiyoko, and Angela Gibbs star in the series.

== Reception ==
=== Critical reception ===
On the review aggregator website Rotten Tomatoes, The Fosters received an overall score of 98%. On Metacritic, the first season of the show holds a score of 69 out of 100, based on twelve reviews, indicating "generally favorable reviews".

While acknowledging its network was somewhat beholden to the "soapy" format its target demographic had become accustomed to, critics praised the series for its ability to appeal to adults and younger viewers alike, with Boston Herald critic Mark A. Perigard writing, "The show cannily plays to teen hopes and dreams [...] but there's story for the adults as well." St. Louis Post-Dispatch critic Gail Pennington echoed the sentiment, writing "Intelligent enough for adults, accessible enough for younger viewers and entertaining enough for both."

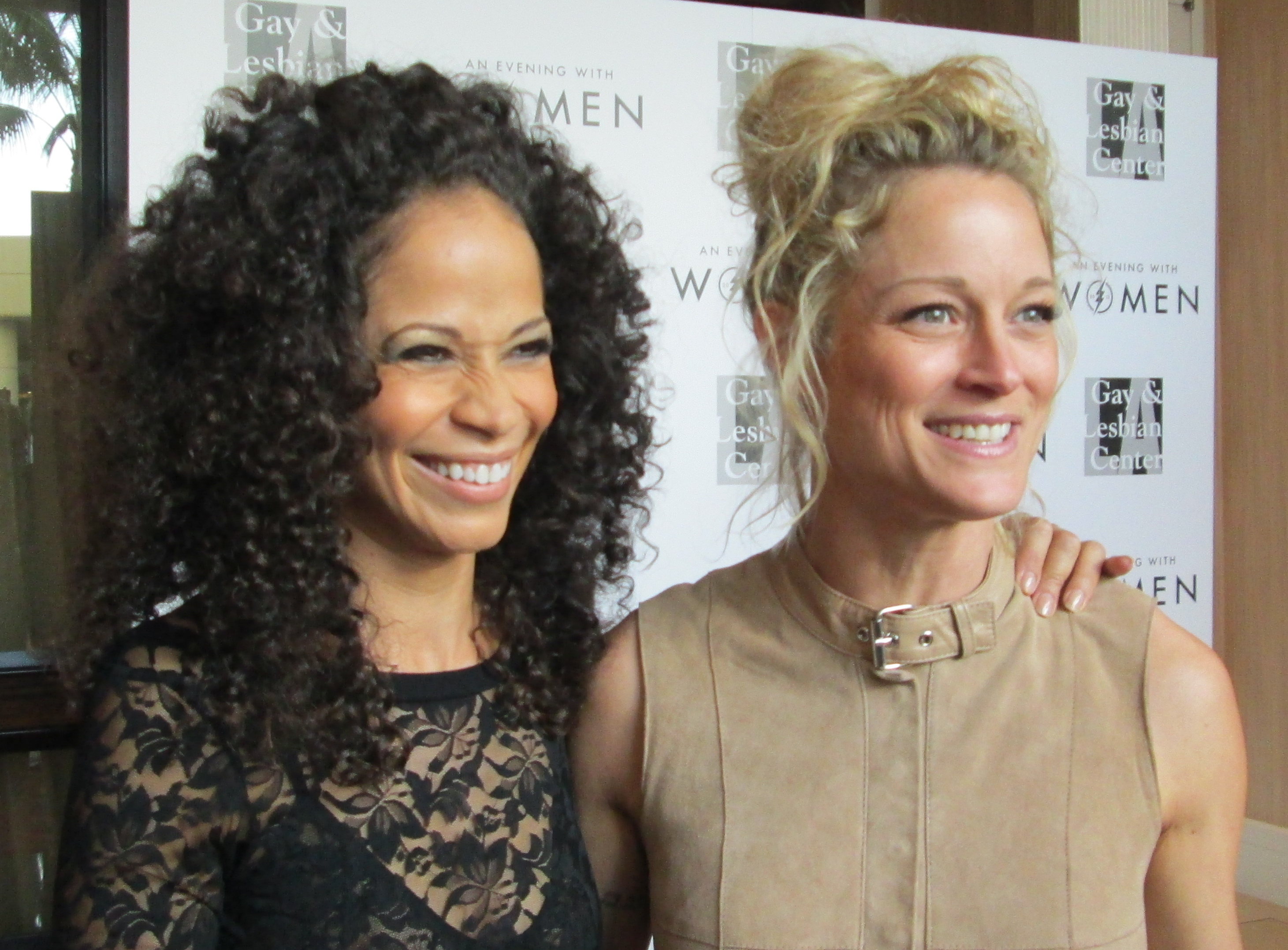
Series stars Sherri Saum and Teri Polo

The series has garnered positive reception for its innovative portrayal of LGBT characters and themes. Entertainment Weekly critic, Sarah Caldwell wrote that "[s]eeing a lesbian, biracial couple on a family TV show is a big deal. [I]f you look at the demographics of most TV shows, it's easy to realize how important, and deliberate, this choice was." Philadelphia Daily News critic Ellen Gray wrote, "Stef and Lena [are] the kind of parents I've met more in real life than on television. I hope they'll be as welcome there as they seem to be welcoming." TV Guide critic Matt Rousch felt similarly, writing, "there's something refreshing about its unforced approach to redefining what a family looks like." In addition to its adult characters, the series garnered praise for its handling of 13-year-old Jude's questioning of his sexual orientation, with Hollywood.com citing Byerly's "heartwarming" portrayal when naming Jude to its list of "Favorite LGBTQ Characters on TV" in 2014. The LGBT advocacy organization GLAAD and gay-interest media outlet TheBacklot.com also commended the show's decision to introduce the character of transgender teenager Cole, portrayed by transgender actor Tom Phelan, in the second half of its first season.

In his review of the pilot episode, Variety's Brian Lowry criticized what he felt were formulaic elements, writing that what was distinctive about the series appeared to have been "extracted during the pitch meeting, indicating a show either built by committee or incorporating too many notes." Although acknowledging that Polo and Saum were competent actresses and that the show "had its heart in the right place", Lowry described the series as an "utterly by-the-numbers affair". PopMatters critic Maysa Hattab detected some of the same problems, writing "[T]he Fosters feel less like a family than a careful assembly of machine-tooled parts, as if the show were engineered for a focus group approved 'family drama' category", while conceding that the lead characters, Stef and Lena were "a likeable pair".

==== Controversy ====
On October 8, 2012, more than seven months prior to the series debut, the socially conservative One Million Moms organization, a division of the American Family Association, condemned Lopez and the show, encouraging audiences to boycott it. The group, which has routinely advocated against the depiction of same-sex couples in the media, stated: "While foster care and adoption is a wonderful thing and the Bible does teach us to help orphans, this program is attempting to redefine marriage and family by having two moms raise these children together." They issued the following statement:

Obviously, ABC has lost their minds. They haven't let up so neither will we. ABC's Family Channel has several anti-family programs, and they are planning on adding to that growing list. ABC Family has approved a series pilot from Jennifer Lopez's production company, Nuyorican, about a lesbian couple and their diverse family.

In response, ABC defended the television show, with ABC Family President Michael Riley countering that The Fosters merges perfectly with the network's "groundbreaking storytelling and iconic characters" and will feature "the same depth, heart, close relationships and authenticity that our viewers have come to expect". Other sources have also defended the show. Josh Middleton, a writer from Philadelphia magazine, called One Million Moms' statement "silliness" as well as "ridiculous" and said, "They obviously missed the boat on shows like Modern Family and The New Normal, which have been on air—and killing it in the ratings game—for a while now".

=== Ratings ===
Seasonal rankings (based on average total viewers per episode) of The Fosters.

Season	Episodes	Time slot (EST)	Premiered		Ended		TV season	Overall viewership
Season	Episodes	Time slot (EST)	Date	Premiere viewers (in millions)	Date	Finale viewers (in millions)	TV season	Overall viewership
1	21	Mondays 9:00 pm	June 3, 2013	1.42	March 24, 2014	1.29	2013–14	1.68
2	21	Mondays 9:00 p.m. (2014); Mondays 8:00 p.m. (2015)	June 16, 2014	1.47	March 23, 2015	1.45	2014–15	1.39
3	20	Mondays 8:00 pm	June 8, 2015	1.26	March 28, 2016	0.77	2015–16	1.00
4	20	Mondays 8:00 pm (2016); Tuesdays 8:00 pm (2017)	June 20, 2016	0.91	April 11, 2017	0.72	2016–17	0.80
5	22	Tuesdays 8:00 pm	July 11, 2017	0.87	June 6, 2018	0.63	2017–18	0.62

=== Accolades ===
Year	Award	Category	Nominee(s)	Result	Ref.
2013	Teen Choice Awards	Choice TV Breakout Show	The Fosters	Won	
2013	Teen Choice Awards	Choice Summer TV Show	The Fosters	Nominated	
2013	Teen Choice Awards	Choice Summer TV Star: Male	Jake T. Austin	Nominated	
2013	Teen Choice Awards	Choice Summer TV Star: Female	Maia Mitchell	Nominated	
2014	NAACP Image Awards	Outstanding Directing in a Drama Series	Millicent Shelton (Episode: "Clean")	Nominated	
2014	GLAAD Media Awards	Outstanding Drama Series	The Fosters	Won	
2014	GLAAD Media Awards	GLAAD Vanguard Award	Jennifer Lopez (Executive producer)	Won	
2014	TCA Awards	Outstanding Achievement in Youth Programming	The Fosters	Nominated	
2014	Teen Choice Awards	Drama Show	The Fosters	Nominated	
2014	Teen Choice Awards	Drama: Actor	Jake T. Austin	Nominated	
2014	Teen Choice Awards	Drama: Actress	Maia Mitchell	Nominated	
2014	Teen Choice Awards	Choice summer TV Star: Male	David Lambert	Nominated	
2014	Teen Choice Awards	Choice summer TV Star: Female	Cierra Ramirez	Nominated	
2015	GLAAD Media Awards	Outstanding Drama Series	The Fosters	Nominated	
2015	TCA Awards	Outstanding Achievement in Youth Programming	The Fosters	Won	
2015	Teen Choice Awards	Drama Show	The Fosters	Nominated	
2015	Teen Choice Awards	Drama: Actress	Maia Mitchell	Nominated	
2015	Teen Choice Awards	Drama: Actor	Jake T. Austin	Nominated	
2015	Teen Choice Awards	Choice summer TV Star: Male	David Lambert	Nominated	
2016	People's Choice Awards	Favorite Cable TV Drama	The Fosters	Nominated	
2016	GLAAD Media Awards	Outstanding Drama Series	The Fosters	Nominated	
2016	Teen Choice Awards	Choice TV Actress: Drama	Maia Mitchell	Nominated	
2016	Teen Choice Awards	Choice Summer TV Show	The Fosters	Nominated	
2016	Teen Choice Awards	Choice Summer TV Star: Male	David Lambert	Nominated	
2016	Teen Choice Awards	Choice Summer TV Star: Female	Cierra Ramirez	Nominated	
2018	Teen Choice Awards	Choice Drama TV Show	The Fosters	Nominated	
2018	Teen Choice Awards	Choice Drama TV Actress	Maia Mitchell	Nominated	

== Spin-off ==
On January 3, 2018, following the announcement of the ending of the series, Freeform announced a spin-off was in the works. It would center the lives of Callie and Mariana Adams Foster, now living in Los Angeles, a few years after the series finale of The Fosters, which contains a five-year time jump. The spin-off was given a 13-episode order. On May 23, 2018, it was announced that the title of the spin-off series was Good Trouble. On February 5, 2019, it was announced via Twitter that the show has been renewed for a second season. On January 17, 2020, the series has been renewed for a third season. The renewal for the fourth season was announced on September 8, 2021. The fourth season premiered on March 9, 2022 on freeform, and on March 10 on Hulu. The fifth and final season aired in two parts.
