= Anthony Clark (actor) =

American actor and comedian (1964–2026)

- Clark in 2003
- Born: Anthony Duane Clark; April 4, 1964; Lynchburg, Virginia, U.S.
- Died: November 10, 2026 (aged 62)
- Education: Emerson College
- Occupations: Actor; comedian; producer
- Years active: 1991–2006; 2012

Anthony Duane Clark (April 4, 1964 – November 10, 2026) was an American actor, producer and comedian best known for starring in the CBS sitcom Yes, Dear, in which he played the character Greg Warner.

== Early life ==
Clark was born in Lynchburg, Virginia, on April 4, 1964. His father was a factory worker and his mother owned a general store. His parents divorced when he was five. When he was 12, the family moved to a tobacco farm 20 miles south in Gladys, Virginia, where his stepfather lived. Clark was named College Entertainer of the Year while studying at Emerson College. Clark graduated from Emerson in 1986 with a degree in mass communications. After college, Clark broke into stand-up comedy, performing gigs at Boston and Los Angeles comedy clubs. He came out as gay to fellow friends and peers in Boston.

== Career ==
Clark began his career as a stand-up comedian. He was a feature on a 1995 HBO young comedians special hosted by Garry Shandling along with Dave Chappelle, Dave Attell, and Louis C.K.

Before landing a regular starring television role, Clark appeared in several small film roles, including a supporting role as Billy in Peter Bogdanovich's The Thing Called Love starring River Phoenix, Samantha Mathis, and Dermot Mulroney; and as Paul, the flamboyant hotel barber in 1996's The Rock. In 1995 and 1996, he also had a recurring role on the sitcom Ellen.

His first starring role was in the short-lived television comedy series Boston Common. He then appeared in another short-lived series as a main cast member in Soul Man.

In 2000, Clark landed the role of Greg Warner in the television comedy Yes, Dear. For this role, he was nominated for a Young Artist Award (along with co-star Jean Louisa Kelly as the Most Popular Mom & Dad in a Television Series) and a Prism Award. Along with Mike O'Malley, his Yes, Dear co-star, he appears in Alan Jackson's 2005 music video for "The Talkin' Song Repair Blues". In March 2006, CBS cancelled Yes, Dear after 6 seasons, when Clark was hired to host NBC's Last Comic Standing for one season.

In 2011, opposite Missi Pyle and John Michael Higgins, Clark starred as Jack Schumacher in the comedy My Uncle Rafael.

== Death ==
Clark died of septic shock, with influenza A and chronic alcoholism also included as underlying conditions, as well as acute kidney failure, on November 10, 2026, at the age of 62. His death was publicly announced the following day via a tribute post on social media by Mike O'Malley, co-star of Yes, Dear.

== Filmography ==
Films

Year	Title	Role	Notes
1991	Dogfight	Oakie	
1993	The Thing Called Love	Billy	
1994	Teresa's Tattoo	Mooney	
1995	Hourglass	Jimmy Jardine	
1996	The Rock	Paul	
2000	Killing Cinderella	Brad	
2002	Paid in Full	Rico's Buddy #1	
2003	Beat Boys Beat Girls	Gichi	Short film
2005	Say Uncle	Russell Trotter	
2006	Grad Night	DJ	
2012	My Uncle Rafael	Jack	

Television

Year	Title	Role	Notes
1995	Dr. Katz, Professional Therapist	Tony (voice)	Episode: "Family Car"
1995–96	Ellen	Will Davies	4 episodes
1996–97	Boston Common	Boyd Pritchett	Lead role (32 episodes)
1997–98	Soul Man	Rev. Todd Tucker	Main role (25 episodes)
1998	Sesame Street	Letter carrier	Episode: "3743"
1998	Murder She Purred: A Mrs. Murphy Mystery	Tucker (voice)	Television film
2000–06	Yes, Dear	Greg Warner	Main role (122 episodes)
2006	Last Comic Standing	Himself	Host (Season 4)
