= Forrest Films =

American film production company

- Type: Private
- Industry: Entertainment
- Founded: 2018
- Founder: Forrest Lucas; Ali Afshar
- Headquarters: Burbank, California, United States
- Services: Film production; Film financing; Film distribution
- Divisions: ESX Productions
- Website: forrest-films.com

Forrest Films is an American film production, financing, and distribution company. It was formed in 2018 and is headquartered in Burbank, California, on the Warner Bros lot.

== History ==
Forrest Films was founded in December 2018 by Lucas Oil founder Forrest Lucas and race car driver-actor-producer Ali Afshar, with Afshar as CEO. The company aims to make inspirational and hopeful family films. ESX Productions, a film production and financing company formed in 2015 by Lucas and Afshar, operates as a label under the Forrest Films banner. Scott Kennedy, formerly head of operations and distribution for Open Road Films, was named president of worldwide marketing and distribution. In February 2019, Christina Moore, a former Mad TV cast member, was named vice president of development and production; Ava Rettke was named director of development and production; and Forrest Films signed a three-film deal with producer Hadeel Reda.

Prior to the formation of Forrest Films, Lucas and Afshar produced several films through ESX: The Dog Lover, starring Lea Thompson; Running Wild, starring Sharon Stone; American Wrestler: The Wizard, based on Afshar's time as a high school wrestler; Pray for Rain, starring Jane Seymour; and Dirt, starring DeRon Horton.

In July 2019, it was announced that Forrest Films would produce the mixed martial arts film Mickey Kelley, starring Sean Patrick Flanery, Katrina Bowden, and Dennis Quaid, written by Flanery and Alex Ranarivelo, and directed by Ranarivelo. It will also feature MMA fighters Renzo Gracie, Edson Barboza, and Mickey Gall. Other planned releases at that point included romantic drama Roped, sports drama Lady Driver, thriller The Stand at Paxton County, and comedy Wheels of Fortune.

The first Forrest Films production, Bennett's War, starring Michael Roark and Trace Adkins, was released in theaters in the United States on August 30, 2019. Later in 2019, Forrest Films released the drama film The Ride, starring Shane Graham and Ludacris and based on the life of BMX racer John Buultjens. The company planned to release seven films by 2021, each with a budget of $5 million or less.

== Films ==
Year	Title	Release date	Notes
2016	The Dog Lover	July 8, 2016	
2017	Running Wild	February 10, 2017	
2017	American Wrestler: The Wizard	May 16, 2017	Distributed by Warner Bros. Home Entertainment
2017	Pray for Rain	June 16, 2017	
2018	Dirt	March 6, 2018	Distributed by Warner Bros. Home Entertainment
2019	Bennett's War	August 30, 2019	
2019	The Ride	December 6, 2019	
2020	Wheels of Fortune	November 1, 2020	Distributed by Netflix
2022	Holiday Harmony	November 24, 2022	Distributed by HBO Max
2022	A Christmas Mystery	November 24, 2022	Distributed by HBO Max
2022	A Hollywood Christmas	December 1, 2022	Distributed by HBO Max
2024	The Curse of the Necklace	September 27, 2024	Distributed by Warner Bros. Home Entertainment
2025	Day of Reckoning	March 28, 2025	Distributed by Warner Bros. Home Entertainment
2026	Double Trouble	October 9, 2026	Distributed by Warner Bros. Home Entertainment
