= Protect the Harvest (2011 lobbying group) =

American anti-animal rights organization

- Protect the Harvest Logo
- Formation: 2011
- Founder: Forrest Lucas
- Dissolved: 2024
- Headquarters: Brownsburg, Indiana
- Key people: Forrest Lucas (Founder & Board Chairman); Dale Ludwig (Board President); Theresa Lucas McMahan (Board Secretary & Executive Director); Jim Haworth(Board Treasurer); Mike Siemens, Ph.D.(Director)

Protect the Harvest was an American 501(c)(4) non-profit advocacy organization founded by Forrest Lucas which opposed "the radical animal rights movement" and particularly the Humane Society of the United States (HSUS), which it called "a wealthy and successful attack group". It also collaborated to the production of two films that were generally panned by critics. The organization had an allied political action committee (PAC), the Protect the Harvest PAC, which funded campaigns to assist or defeat candidates for political office.

== Overview ==
The organization's founder and executive director was Lucas Oil owner, Forrest Lucas. Lucas had invested over $600,000 in the organization. Brian Klippenstein was the executive director of the organization and treasurer of the associated PAC, before joining the U.S. Department of Agriculture as an advisor to Secretary Sonny Perdue, who was in the position from 2017 to 2021.

== History ==
Protect the Harvest was founded in 2011 by Forrest Lucas. Protect the Harvest is a supporter of right-to-farm laws as proposed by the American Legislative Exchange Council. In 2010, Lucas put money into the campaign to defeat Proposition B, designed to prevent cruelty to dogs in puppy mills, in Missouri, which was lost. Reports indicated that Lucas supported efforts from the Missouri legislature that would weaken and repeal voter-approved measures, even though those measures did not have enough time to take into effect.

In 2014, Lucas invested in the winning campaign to pass Measure 1 in Missouri, which amended the state Constitution to protect "the right of Missouri citizens to engage in agricultural production and ranching practices". Lucas contributed almost $200,000 to oppose Question 3, a Massachusetts ballot initiative banning the sale of products from animals raised in "extreme" confinement, which passed with strong support in 2016; Protect the Harvest also underwrote a failed legal challenge to the measure.

On February 5, 2017, Lucas and the Trump administration purged thousands of pages from the Animal Welfare Act and the Horse Protection Act from the USDA-APHIS website. This resulted in a variety of information, including facility inspection reports, violations of such inspections, or violations of the Horse Protection Act in general, no longer being easily accessible to the public - instead requiring a Freedom of Information Act request to view. On November 16, 2022, Protect the Harvest's founder, Forrest Lucas, was awarded the 2022 Veritas Award by the American Agri-Women. In September 2023, Mike Siemens was named the executive director and Theresa Lucas McMahan was named the chief administrative officer for Protect the Harvest.

In October 2024, the organization ceased operation, citing ongoing financial struggles that began during the COVID-19 pandemic.

== Funding ==
Between October 2011 and December 2012, Protect the Harvest raised approximately $927,000. In 2012, according to FEC records, Lucas Oil contributed $200,000 to Protect the Harvest to fund advertisements against Christie Vilsack, who challenged and lost to incumbent Iowa congressman Steve King. Protect the Harvest also received funds from American Action Network, a group led by former senator Norm Coleman, and a group called Missouri Farmers Care. The Protect the Harvest PAC spent $256,018 in the 2014 election cycle, and $116,300 in the 2016 cycle.

== Films ==
=== The Dog Lover ===
Protect the Harvest collaborated with ESX Entertainment to produce the 2016 movie The Dog Lover. The film depicts an idealistic college student sent undercover by an animal welfare organization to investigate a puppy mill, and eventually becoming disillusioned with the welfare organization, which is presented as unethical. The film presents itself as "based on a true story", although there are major differences between its portrayal and the South Dakota court case which inspired it.

The film received an overall rating of "rotten" from review aggregator Rotten Tomatoes, with seven out of nine negative reviews. Michael Rechtshaffen, writing for the Los Angeles Times, called the film's execution "spottier than a kennel full of caged Dalmatians", and Glenn Kenny of Rogerebert.com labeled it "shamelessly manipulative", while Owen Gleiberman of Variety wrote that "it’s a prosaic piece of muckraking, but it grazes a nerve", calling its pro–breeding industry strategy "cunning". The film's premiere in Springfield, Missouri, which included a live auction of an Australian Shepherd, inspired a small protest.

=== Pray for Rain ===
In 2017, Protect the Harvest and ESX entertainment produced Pray for Rain, directed by Alex Ranarivelo, which follows a young reporter (Annabelle Stephenson) as she investigates the murder of her farming father amid the 2011–17 California drought. The film advances a form of the California drought manipulation conspiracy theory, incorrectly blaming environmentalists and bureaucrats for creating a "man-made" water shortage. The film received negative reviews, with Roger Moore of Movie Nation calling it a "ludicrous Lucas Oil-man financed propaganda picture", and Brian Orndorf of Blu-ray.com writing, "As much as I enjoy the image of Jane Seymour blasting away with a shotgun that’s probably bigger than she is, the melodrama of the effort only manages to cripple the production."
