= Wind of Change (2027 film) =

American musical biographical film

- Directed by: Alex Ranarivelo
- Screenplay by: Mark Andrews
- Produced by: Ali Afshar; Christina Moore; Daniel Aspromonte
- Starring: Dominic West; Alexander Dreymon; Ludwig Trepte; Ed Speleers; David Kross; Luke Brandon Field
- Production companies: ESX Entertainment; Fox Entertainment Studios
- Distributed by: Roadside Attractions
- Release date: March 2027
- Country: United States
- Language: English

Wind of Change is an upcoming American musical biographical film about the German rock band Scorpions. The cast includes Ludwig Trepte, Ed Speleers, Alexander Dreymon, and Luke Brandon Field as members of the band, with Dominic West as the band's manager Doc McGhee.

== Cast ==
- Dominic West as Doc McGhee
- Alexander Dreymon as Rudolf Schenker
- Ludwig Trepte as Klaus Meine
- Ed Speleers as Matthias Jabs
- David Kross as Andrej
- Luke Brandon Field as Herman Rarebell
- Spencer Elcock as Wolfgang Dziony
- Tom Sterling as Uncle Bernhard

== Production ==
The film is produced by ESX Entertainment with Fox Entertainment Studios in association with Warner Bros. Entertainment. It is directed by Alex Ranarivelo from a script by Mark Andrews. Producers include Ali Afshar, Christina Moore and Daniel Aspromonte with the film announced as being in development in 2024.

The cast is led by Dominic West as the Scorpions' manager, with the band portrayed by Ed Speleers, Luke Brandon Field, Alexander Dreymon and Ludwig Trepte, with David Kross portraying a friend stuck on the other side of the Berlin Wall.

Principal photography took place in the first half of 2025 in England with filming locations including Liverpool and Warner Bros. Studios Leavesden.

== Release ==
Initially, the film was aimed for a late 2025 release to coincide with a 60th anniversary for the band. The German branch of Warner Bros. Pictures plans to release the film in German theaters on January 28, 2027. In November 2026, Roadside Attractions acquired North American distribution rights to the film, planning to release it theatrically in the United States in March 2027.
