= Born a Champion =

2021 American martial arts film

- Official poster
- Directed by: Alex Ranarivelo
- Written by: Sean Patrick Flanery; Alex Ranarivelo
- Produced by: Ali Afshar; Paul J. Alessi; Kevin Asbell; Daniel Aspromonte; Sean Patrick Flanery; George Kosturos; Forrest Lucas; Ava Rettke
- Starring: Sean Patrick Flanery; Dennis Quaid; Katrina Bowden
- Cinematography: Reuben Steinberg
- Edited by: Brett Hedlund
- Music by: Austin Wintory
- Production companies: Grindstone Entertainment Group; ESX Entertainment; Forrest Films
- Distributed by: Lionsgate Home Entertainment; Red Sea Media
- Release date: January 22, 2021
- Running time: 112 minutes
- Country: United States
- Language: English

Born a Champion is a 2021 American martial arts drama directed by Alex Ranarivelo and written by Sean Patrick Flanery and Ranarivelo. It stars Flanery, Dennis Quaid and Katrina Bowden. The film also features mixed martial arts fighter Edson Barboza, with appearances by Renzo Gracie and Mickey Gall.

== Plot ==
Mickey Kelley, a former U.S. Marine and one of the first American black belts in Brazilian Jiu-Jitsu, gets pulled away from everything he loves and into an unsanctioned MMA tournament.

== Cast ==
- Sean Patrick Flanery as Mickey Kelley
- Katrina Bowden as Layla
- Dennis Quaid as Mason
- Maurice Compte as Rosco “aka Taco”
- Currie Graham as Burchman
- Costas Mandylor as Dimitris
- Reno Wilson as Terry Pittman
- Ali Afshar as The Sheik
- Edson Barboza as Marco Blaine

== Production ==
Forrest Films announced their intent to film Born a Champion, then titled Mickey Kelley, in July 2019. Alex Ranarivelo was named as the director and actors Sean Patrick Flanery, Katrina Bowden, and Dennis Quaid were also announced as some of the film's central characters. Flanery also served as one of the film's producers and co-wrote the script alongside Ranarivelo. Flanery called the film a "love letter to BJJ" in the film's credits, as a result of "what it's done for me; how it's changed me; what it's done for my perspective on life, love and happiness and family."

Filming took place in Petaluma, California during the summer of 2019 and wrapped in August of the same year.

== Release ==
The film received a limited release in select theaters in the United States on January 22, 2021 and became available via video on demand the same day. It was released on Blu-ray and DVD on January 26, 2021.
