= Jamie Christopherson =

American composer

- Born: 1975 (age 50–51); Los Angeles, California, U.S.
- Education: Vassar College (AB); University of Miami (MA)
- Occupations: Musician, composer
- Website: jamiechristopherson.com

Jamie Christopherson (born 1975) is an American musician who has contributed scores to a number of popular films and video games, including the movie The Crow: Wicked Prayer, and the games Onimusha: Dawn of Dreams and Metal Gear Rising: Revengeance.

== Biography ==
He received a Bachelor of Arts degree from Vassar College in 1997. While living in Boston soon after his graduation, Christopherson worked as an assistant to local television/film composers. Deciding that he wished to pursue his career further, he received his Master's degree in Music from the University of Miami in 2000.

== Works ==
=== Film and television ===
Film and television
Title	Year	Director(s)	Notes
Lost Cause	2000	Glenn Gaylord	Short film
Boychick	2001	Glenn Gaylord	Short film
Size 'Em Up	2001	Chris J. Russo	Short film
Avatars Offline	2002	Daniel Liatowitsch	—N/a
Frame of Mind	2003	Simon Joecker	Short film
Maximum Velocity	2003	Phillip J. Roth	—N/a
Epoch: Evolution	2004	Ian Watson	Television film
A Woman Reported	2004	Chris J. Russo	Short film
Boa vs. Python	2004	David Flores	Short film
Phantom Force	2004	Christian McIntire	Short film
The Crow: Wicked Prayer	2005	Lance Mungia	—N/a
Inside Out	2005	David Ogden	—N/a
S.S. Doomtrooper	2006	David Flores	—N/a
Goalkeepers	2006	Simon Joecker	—N/a
Lez Be Friends	2007	Glenn Gaylord	—N/a
Ghost Image	2007	Jack Snyder	—N/a
Jack Hunter and the Lost Treasure of Ugarit	2008–2009	—N/a	3 episodes
Bottom Feeders	2009	Alyssa Barber	—N/a
Remember Me	2009	Minh Collins	—N/a
Bigfoot	2009	Kevin Tenney	—N/a
Born to Race	2011	Alex Ranarivelo	—N/a
Born to Race: Race Track	2011	Alex Ranarivelo	—N/a
Love Finds You in Sugarcreek	2014	Terry Cunningham	Television film
Love Finds You in Charm	2014	Terry Cunningham	Television film
Summer Forever	2015	Roman White	—N/a
Love Finds You in Valentine	2016	Terry Cunningham	Television film
The Dog Lover	2016	Alex Ranarivelo	—N/a
Running Wild	2017	Alex Ranarivelo	—N/a
American Wrestler: The Wizard	2017	Alex Ranarivelo	
An Uncommon Grace	2017	David Mackay	Television film
Enchanted Christmas	2017	Terry Cunningham	Television film
Runaway Romance	2018	Brian Herzlinger	Television film
Closure	2018	Alex Goldberg	—N/a
Dirt	2018	Alex Ranarivelo	—N/a
Ride	2018	Alex Ranarivelo	—N/a
Bennett's War	2019	Alex Ranarivelo	
Wheels of Fortune	2020	Shaun Piccinino	—N/a
Holiday Harmony	2022	Shaun Piccinino	
A Christmas Mystery	2022	Alex Ranarivelo	
A Hollywood Christmas	2022	Alex Ranarivelo	
The Curse of the Necklace	2024	Juan Pablo Arias Munoz	
Day Of Reckoning	2025	Shaun Silva	
Casa Grande	2026	Juan Pablo Arias Muñoz	
Double Trouble	2026	Shaun Piccinino	—N/a

=== Video games ===
Video games
Title	Year	System	Notes
Toontown Online	2003	Microsoft Windows	Collaboration with several other composers.
Lineage II: The Chaotic Chronicle	2003	Microsoft Windows	Additional music co-composed with Bill Brown
The Lord of the Rings: The Battle for Middle-Earth	2004	Microsoft Windows	Additional music co-composed with Bill Brown
Onimusha: Dawn of Dreams	2006	PlayStation 2	—N/a
Mortal Kombat: Armageddon	2006	PlayStation 2, Wii, Xbox	Composed opening music FMV
Lost Planet: Extreme Condition	2006	Xbox, Windows, PlayStation 3	Music and Theme composition, co-composed with Akihiko Narita and Shuji Uchiyama
The Lord of the Rings: The Battle for Middle-earth II	2006	Windows, Xbox 360	Additional music co-composed with Bill Brown
Surf's Up	2007	GameCube, PlayStation 2, PlayStation 3, Wii, Windows, Xbox 360	—N/a
Stranglehold	2007	Windows, PlayStation 3, Xbox 360	Co-composed with Jim Bonney, Sascha Dikiciyan and Cris Velasco
Pirates of the Caribbean Online	2007	Windows, Mac OS X	—N/a
The Golden Compass	2007	PlayStation 3, PSP, Wii, Windows, Xbox 360	—N/a
Bladestorm: The Hundred Years' War	2007	PlayStation 3, PlayStation 4, Xbox 360, Xbox One, Microsoft Windows	—N/a
Spider-Man: Web of Shadows	2008	PlayStation 2, PlayStation 3, PlayStation Portable, Wii, Windows, Xbox 360	—N/a
Command & Conquer 3: Kane's Wrath	2008	Microsoft Windows, Xbox 360	Co-composed with Mikael Sandgren
Bionic Commando	2009	PlayStation 3, Xbox 360, Windows	—N/a
Lost Planet 2	2010	Windows, Xbox 360	Co-composed with Marika Suzuki and Akiyuki Morimoto
Warriors: Legends of Troy	2011	PlayStation 3, Xbox 360	—N/a
Dead Rising 2: Off the Record	2011	PlayStation 3, Windows, Xbox 360	Additional music
Blade & Soul	2012	Windows, iOS, Android	—N/a
Metal Gear Rising: Revengeance	2013	PlayStation 3, Xbox 360, Microsoft Windows, OS X, Shield Android TV	—N/a
The Mighty Quest for Epic Loot	2015	Windows, iOS, Android	—N/a
Dead Rising 4	2016	Windows, Xbox One	Additional composer
Fortnite	2017	Windows, Xbox, Playstation	Additional composer

=== Other ===
Phones
Phone Brand	Name	Year released	Notes
Samsung	Galaxy S4	2013	
Samsung	Galaxy S5	2014	The song's sound is the same as the Galaxy S4.
Samsung	Galaxy S6	2015	Collaboration with several other composers.
Samsung	Galaxy S20	2020	His latest iteration of the tune that he composed.
