= Brando Eaton =

American film and television actor

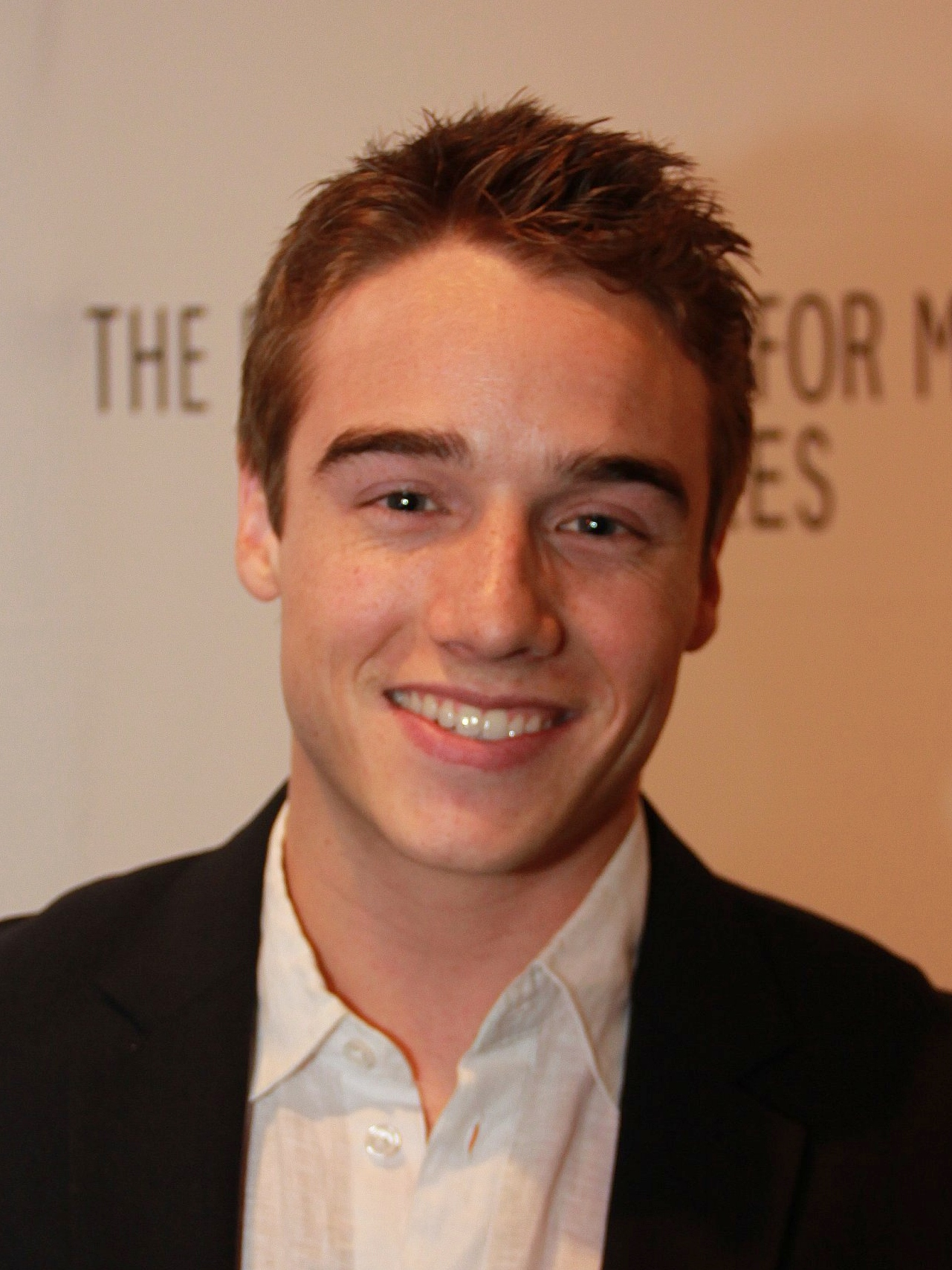
- Eaton in 2010
- Born: Brando Matthew Eaton; July 17, 1986 (age 40); Los Angeles, California, U.S.
- Occupation: Actor
- Years active: 2006–present

Brando Matthew Eaton (born July 17, 1986) is an American film and television actor. He is best known for his roles in Dexter, The Secret Life of the American Teenager, and Zoey 101.

== Early life ==
Brando Matthew Eaton was born on July 17, 1986, in Los Angeles, California, where he was raised as an only child by his single mother. He started doing plays at the age of five and continued until his later high school years. Upon graduating at the age of 17, he decided to finally start pursuing his passion as a career. Brando left home at 18 to start his journey into adulthood, working day jobs to keep up with the costs of living and acting classes.

== Career ==
Brando appeared in such films as Balls Out: Gary the Tennis Coach; Alvin and the Chipmunks: The Squeakquel, and The Powder Puff Principle. He played Vince Blake in Zoey 101 at 20 years old, and appeared in The Secret Life of the American Teenager as Griffin. He has made numerous appearances on television.

In 2016, Eaton endorsed and campaigned for presidential candidate Gary Johnson. He also directed the documentary I Am Gary Johnson.

== Filmography ==
=== Film ===
Year	Title	Role(s)	Notes
2009	Balls Out: Gary the Tennis Coach	Mike "Cappy" Jensen	
2009	Alvin and the Chipmunks: The Squeakquel	Jeremy	
2011	Born to Race	Jake Kendall	
2014	Cabin Fever: Patient Zero	Josh	
2014	American Sniper	Dapper Navy Guy	Uncredited
2015	Some Kind of Hate	Derek	
2015	Woodlawn	Morton	
2016	The Dog Lover	Harley	
2017	Face Off	Ray	Short film
2019	Bennett's War	Kurt Walker	
2021	Monster Hunter: Legends of the Guild	Julius	Voice role

=== Television ===
Year	Title	Role(s)	Notes
2006–2008	Zoey 101	Vince Blake	4 episodes
2007	Notes from the Underbelly	Graham	Episode: "Million Dollar Baby"
2007	CSI: Crime Scene Investigation	Rodney Banks	Episode: "A La Cart"
2007	The Closer	Justin Darcy	Episode: "Homewrecker"
2007	Bionic Woman	Ethan	Episode: "The List"
2007	Journeyman	Young Dan Vasser	Episode: "Keepers"
2008	Do Not Disturb	Jason	Recurring role
2008	The Unit	Josh	Episode: "Sex Trade"
2008	The Mentalist	Danny Kurtik	Episode: "Red Tide"
2008	The Bill Engvall Show	Scott Simmons	2 episodes
2009	Nip/Tuck	Ricky Wells	Episode: "Ricky Wells"
2009	Bones	Rory Davis	Episode: "The Salt in the Wounds"
2009	Mental	Gabe	2 episodes
2009	NCIS	Patrick Ellis	Episode: "Faith"
2009–2011	Dexter	Jonah Mitchell	Recurring role; 8 episodes
2009–2012	The Secret Life of the American Teenager	Griffin	Recurring role; 22 episodes
2010	Miami Medical	Derek	Episode: "Time of Death"
2011	American Horror Story: Murder House	Kyle Greenwell	2 episodes
2012	Talhotblond	Brian	Television film
2012	Burn Notice	Evan	Episode: "Reunion"
2012	Made in Jersey	Doug Hartsock	Episode: "Payday"
2013	Hawaii Five-0	Jacobson	Episode: "A'ale Ma'a Wau"
2013	NCIS: Los Angeles	Mitchell Rome	Episode: "The Livelong Day"
2014	Melissa & Joey	Emerson Pritchard	3 episodes
2014–2016	Awkward	Adam Walker	Recurring role; 8 episodes
2016	Swedish Dicks	Theodore	Episode: "When Ingmar Met Axel"
2016	Rosewood	Star Lord	Episode: "Tree Toxins & Three Stories"
