= Day of Reckoning (2025 film) =

- Theatrical release poster
- Directed by: Shaun Silva
- Written by: Travis J. Opgenorth
- Produced by: Ali Afshar; Daniel Aspromonte; Don Lepore; Christina Moore
- Starring: Billy Zane; Zach Roerig; Scott Adkins; Ali Afshar; Trace Adkins; Cara Jade Myers
- Cinematography: Keith J. Leman
- Edited by: Brett Hedlund
- Music by: Jamie Christopherson
- Production companies: ESX Entertainment; Lila Lane Pictures; Tackle Box Films
- Distributed by: ESX Entertainment; Warner Bros. Pictures (through Warner Bros. Home Entertainment)
- Release dates: March 24, 2025 (Paleyfest); March 28, 2025 (United States)
- Running time: 106 minutes
- Country: United States
- Language: English

Day of Reckoning is a 2025 American Western action thriller film directed by Shaun Silva. The film follows a struggling sheriff who teams up with a tough U.S. Marshal to detain a cunning female outlaw.

The film premiered at Paleyfest on March 24, 2025, and was released on March 28, 2025.

== Plot ==
Outlaw Kyle Trask and his men rob a bank in Tipton and are ambushed by U.S. Marshal Butch Hayden and his taskforce when they return to their hotel hideout. Trask's girlfriend manages to break free momentarily and warn them but Trask is the only one to escape. Marshal Hayden and his men interrogate one of Trask's wounded men and learn that Trask owns a farm in Burnham, Georgia. They beat Trask there and arrest his wife, Emily who is a wanted outlaw herself. Emily killed her abusive step-father who was a cop and shot a bank security job during a previous job. She has a $500,000 bounty on her head. Hayden goes to the local sheriff's office and asks Sheriff John Dorsey for more manpower. Dorsey, struggling with declining public confidence and personal issues, is reeling from a hostage negotiation that went wrong six months earlier. Dorsey accompanies Hayden to the farmhouse and attempts to take Emily into custody but is held at gunpoint by Hayden's men. Kyle arrives shortly after but turns around and leaves after seeing Emily has stopped the windmill as a warning sign.

While she's held prisoner, Emily subtly exploits the deputies’ insecurities, creating distrust and weakening the cohesion of the group. She manages to escape on two occasions: stabbing one marshal to death with a piece of broken plate and holding Hayden at gunpoint before being recaptured by Danny Raise, Dorsey's deputy. Emily tells John that his wife Laura is having an affair with Danny. This results in John and Danny having a brawl after Danny admits to the affair. Danny is asked to stay by Hayden and calls 3 other deer hunters for assistance. However, two of Hayden's men attempt to kidnap Emily so they don't have to split the reward money for her with anyone else. This results in a shootout with both deputy marshals dead, one deer hunter dead, another one wounded and the third one visibly shaken. Danny and John talk Hayden into allowing the deer hunters to leave and get medical attention for the wounded one.

Meanwhile, Kyle has taken his bank robbery money to Big Buck in exchange for a crew to go rescue his wife and kill Hayden. Since Hayden is the one who gunned down his brother in the back years earlier, Big Buck announces that whoever brings Hayden's head back in the money bag can keep the bank job money. Kyle and five other men storm the farmhouse which is now only guarded by Hayden, Dorsey and Danny. Danny takes off running out the back door just prior to the shootout beginning after telling John that he can't do this anymore. With their group effectively collapsed, Dorsey, Hayden, and Emily take cover and attempt to hold off Kyle’s advancing forces.

Under pressure, Dorsey and Hayden form a reluctant partnership with Emily, who even shoots one of the intruders herself. Hayden draws Kyle to the cotton gin which results in a prolonged shootout between the two of them before Kyle shoots him. With only Dorsey left in the house and bleeding out from a shoulder wound. Emily lies to Kyle and says no one is still living in the house and comes out. However, Dorsey staggers out of the house and orders both of them to surrender. Kyle tries to shoot him but is shot by Emily. Hayden then appears and attempts to kill Emily but John shoots him dead.

In a mid-credits scene, one of Big Buck's crew returns with Hayden's head to claim the reward money. John receives a postcard from Emily in Mexico congratulating him on his re-election. A new deputy arrives to replace Danny.

== Cast ==
- Billy Zane as Butch Hayden, a U.S. Marshal
- Zach Roerig as John Dorsey, a sheriff
- Scott Adkins as Kyle Rusk
- Ali Afshar
- Trace Adkins as Big Buck
- Cara Jade Myers as Emily Rusk

American Pickers star Mike Wolfe and model Leticia Cline make cameo appearances.

== Production ==
=== Filming ===
Filming began at Atlanta in December 2024.

=== Casting ===
On January 28, 2025, Scott Adkins and Trace Adkins joined the cast for the film.

== Release ==
Day of Reckoning premiered at the Paleyfest at Los Angeles on March 24, 2025, and was released in the United States on March 28, 2025, by ESX Entertainment. One day before the film's release, a song for the film titled "That Someday", written by Trace Adkins, was released.

=== Home media ===
Warner Bros. Home Entertainment released Day of Reckoning on digital on April 29, 2025.

== Reception ==
Alex Z. Johnson of Vocal Media gave the film four out of five stars, and wrote "Day of Reckoning is a thrilling, action-packed film that transcends typical genre expectations by grounding its story in real emotional stakes".
