= Double Trouble (2026 film) =

- Theatrical release poster
- Directed by: Shaun Piccinino
- Written by: John Ducey
- Produced by: Ali Afshar; Daniel Aspromonte; Christina Moore
- Starring: Violet McGraw; Madeleine McGraw; Andrew Koji; Struggle Jennings
- Cinematography: Brad Rushing
- Edited by: Chance LaSalle
- Music by: Jamie Christopherson
- Production company: ESX Entertainment
- Distributed by: Warner Bros. Pictures; Seismic Releasing
- Release date: October 9, 2026
- Running time: 89 minutes
- Country: United States
- Language: English

Double Trouble is a 2026 American heist action comedy film directed by Shaun Piccinino and written by John Ducey. It stars Violet McGraw, Madeleine McGraw, Brynne Kurland, Andrew Koji, Azizi Donnelly, Jack Griffo, and Struggle Jennings.

Double Trouble was released on October 9, 2026 by Warner Bros. Pictures and Seismic Releasing.

== Plot ==
Two sisters are caught in the middle of a high-stakes heist in Las Vegas, when they must team up with a former MI6 agent, to outsmart a cunning thief and save a diamond gauntlet, before Christmas time.

== Cast ==
- Violet McGraw as Willow
- Madeleine McGraw as Charlotte
- Andrew Koji as David
- Jack Griffo as Juniper
- Struggle Jennings as Omar
- Shin Lim as himself
- Azizi Donnelly as Robyn
- Brynne Kurland as Jackie

== Production ==
In April 2025, it was announced that principal photography had begun in Las Vegas on a heist action comedy film directed by Shaun Piccinino and written by John Ducey. Violet McGraw, Madeleine McGraw, Brynne Kurland, Andrew Koji, Azizi Donnelly, Jack Griffo, and Struggle Jennings joined the cast. In June, Shin Lim joined the cast, as well as Warner Bros. Pictures acquiring the distribution rights. Warner Bros. partnered up with Seismic Releasing for co-distribution on the film.

== Release ==
The film was released in select theaters on October 9, 2026 by Warner Bros. Pictures and Seismic Releasing. This is the first release by Warner Bros. after the acquisition of Warner Bros. Discovery by Paramount Skydance.
