= Bennett's War =

- Directed by: Alex Ranarivelo
- Written by: Alex Ranarivelo
- Produced by: Ali Afshar; Christina Moore
- Starring: Michael Roark; Trace Adkins; Ali Afshar; Allison Paige
- Cinematography: Reuben Steinberg
- Edited by: Brett Hedlund
- Music by: Jamie Christopherson
- Production company: ESX Entertainment
- Distributed by: Forrest Films
- Release date: August 30, 2019 (United States)
- Running time: 94 minutes
- Country: United States
- Language: English
- Box office: $1.1 million

Bennett's War is a 2019 American drama-sport film written and directed by Alex Ranarivelo. The film stars Michael Roark, Trace Adkins, Ali Afshar, and Allison Paige. It was released theatrically in the United States by Forrest Films on August 30, 2019.

== Plot ==
Bennett's War is about a young soldier, Marshall Bennett (Michael Roark), who is in 75th Ranger Regiment during the War in Afghanistan (2001–2021) in Army Motorcycle Unit. He survives an improvised explosive device (IED) explosion while in combat, breaking his legs, and is in turn medically discharged and sent back home to the United States. Once home, he learns that his dad, Cal Bennett (Adkins), is behind on his mortgage and may lose the family farm. Marshall wants to help, but the only thing he can think to do is become a motocross racer. He ignores all medical advice and goes back to the motocross circuit. After he wins a few races against his arch-rival Chris Walker and his brother Kurt, Chris and Kurt cause him to have a bad crash injuring his legs again. Some time later Chris and Kurt's team manager, Cyrus, visits Bennett and tells him that Chris and Kurt betrayed him and now he doesn't have a rider for either the Loretta Lynn Amateur National or the Glen Helen National race. Bennett wins the amateur race and qualifies for the pro race. After Kurt and Chris take out multiple riders, the last lap is between Kurt, Chris, and Bennett. On the last turn Kurt tries to crash Bennett like he did earlier but Bennett hits the brakes and Kurt crashes instead. Bennett beats Chris in a photo finish and celebrates with his pit crew.

== Cast ==
- Michael Roark as Marshall Bennett
- Trace Adkins as Cal Bennett
- Ali Afshar as Cyrus
- Allison Paige as Sophie Bennett
- Hunter Clowdus as Chris Walker
- Brando Eaton as Kurt Walker
- Michael King as Riley
- Violet McGraw as Rebecca
- Tony Panterra as himself

== Production ==
In May 2019, it was reported that Country musician Trace Adkins was portraying the father of Marshall Bennett (played by Michael Roark). The film is loosely based on case histories of real-life wounded veterans, and was shot on actual motocross tracks with real racers.

== Release and reception ==
Bennett's War premiered in Nashville, Tennessee, on August 29, 2019, and opened theatrically in the United States on August 30, 2019. Dennis Harvey of Variety called it "modest but enjoyable" with "lots of impressive racing footage and stunt work," adding that "it should provide an inviting alternative for audiences on the lookout for inspirational family-friendly fare." John DeFore of The Hollywood Reporter called it "a wholesomely formulaic sports picture rooting its comeback narrative in themes of military duty." John Mulderig of Catholic News Services wrote, "The movie's heart is in the right place and its story arc, though it forms a predictable parabola, will leave viewers feeling cheered." Linda Cook of Quad-City Times wrote, "An above-average, fast-paced story about recovery and grit, Bennett's War has its moments, especially when it comes to the challenges injured veterans face when they return home." She praised Roark's performance, saying he has "a wonderful presence in front of the camera… He carries this film beautifully." On the review aggregator website Rotten Tomatoes, 50% of 8 critics' reviews are positive, with an average rating of 5.2/10.
