= Balls Out: Gary the Tennis Coach =

- Directed by: Danny Leiner
- Written by: Andy Stock; Rick Stempson
- Produced by: Danny Leiner; Seann William Scott
- Starring: Seann William Scott; Randy Quaid; A. D. Miles; Brando Eaton; Leonor Varela
- Cinematography: Rogier Stoffers
- Edited by: Matthew Rohrs
- Music by: John Swihart
- Production company: GreeneStreet Films
- Distributed by: Sony Pictures Home Entertainment
- Release date: January 14, 2009 (United States)
- Running time: 92 minutes
- Country: United States
- Language: English
- Budget: $15 million
- Box office: $10,303

Balls Out: Gary the Tennis Coach is a 2009 American sports comedy film directed by Danny Leiner (in his final directorial effort before his death) and starring Seann William Scott and Randy Quaid alongside A. D. Miles, Brando Eaton and Leonor Varela. The film follows Gary "The Beast" Houseman (Scott), a high school janitor and former professional tennis player who begins coaching the high school's tennis team, and marks the second collaboration between Leiner and Scott, following Dude, Where's My Car? (2000). Filming took place primarily in Austin and Taylor, Texas.

Balls Out was released direct-to-video in the United States on January 14, 2009. The film received a limited theatrical release in Iceland on July 15, 2009. It received mixed to negative reviews.

== Plot ==
Gary Houseman is a born and bred tennis player of a dynasty of professional players but traumatized over being beaten endlessly by his brother and being beaten literally in high school for frequent cheating. He takes it up professionally in Mexico but is abandoned in Nebraska by his so-called motorcycle gang friends. Gary decides to permanently reside in the state capital Lincoln earning his living as a janitor at West Lincoln High School where an extracurricular program of tennis draws him back into the game where he initially volunteers as assistant to Coach Lew Tuttle but when Lew's untimely death in a classroom affects him personally, Principal Dick instates Gary as co-coach with Steve, an uncharismatic prude who is very hands-off in contrast to Gary's over-the-top unorthodox coaching methods on the tennis boys such as dropping a folder of past game results on the court floor then regurgitating on it, hitting Burke and Kevin with tennis balls and hiring a stripper for Mike "Cappy" deflowering. Lew's daughter Jenny, whose not very athletic herself but encourages Gary to continue coaching despite being suspended over consoling her over her father's death after a school dance, having been ratted on by a QB fotball player. After a surreal dream at Lew's grave, Gary coaches the boys tennis team to the state championship finals with Mike "Cappy" beating rival Timmy Tremble. Gary starts a relationship with Spanish teacher Argentine Norma and asks her out at the end while she is coaching girl's volleyball.

== Cast ==
- Seann William Scott as Gary "The Beast" Houseman
- Randy Quaid as Coach Lew Tuttle
- Brando Eaton as Mike "Cappy" Jensen
- Emilee Wallace as Jenny Tuttle
- A.D. Miles as Steve "The Bunsen Burner" Pimble
- Leonor Varela as Norma Sanchez
- Daniel Ross as Jeffery Vanier
- Tim Williams as Dickhead Daubert
- Ryan Simpkins as Amy Daubert
- Conor Donovan as Burke "Nibby" Nibbons
- Allen Evangelista as Maricar Magwill
- Justin Chon as Joe Chang
- Vincent Coleman Taylor as Kevin Jones (as Vincent Taylor)
- Bryan Mitchell as Randy King
- Remington Dewan as Paul the Videographer
- Meredith Eaton as Phyllis Tuttle
- Joseph Dwyer as Tommy Tremble
- Sterling Knight as Opposing Team Tennis Player (uncredited)
- Deke Anderson as Gary's father Gil Houseman
- Tricia Bergan as "Stephie/Steffi Graf/Nash" the stripper

== Production ==
In April 2006, it was announced that Seann William Scott would be producing and starring in an independent comedy film titled Gary the Tennis Coach.

The screenplay, written by Andy Stock and Rick Stempson, won the 2005 BlueCat Screenplay Competition. The screenplay under the title "Gary the Tennis Coach" was featured on the 2005 Black List script survey. The film is set in Lincoln, Nebraska, but was filmed mostly in Austin, Texas, and various locations around the city. The writers are both Lincoln East High School graduates. During post-production, the film's title was changed to Balls Out: Gary the Tennis Coach.

== Release ==
Balls Out was released direct-to-video by Sony Pictures Home Entertainment on January 14, 2009.

== Reception ==
=== Critical response ===
On review aggregator Rotten Tomatoes, the film holds a popcornmeter rating of 27% based on 2,500+ ratings, with an average rating of 5.4/10. The website's critics consensus reads, "...there eventually does reach a point at which Scott's performance, ingratiating as it is, simply proves unable to compensate for the film's myriad of deficiencies."
