= Emilee Wallace =

American actress (born 1989)

- Born: Emilee Wallace; September 19, 1989 (age 36); Oklahoma City, Oklahoma, U.S.
- Education: California State University
- Occupation: Actress
- Years active: 2005–present
- Website: http://emileewallace.com/

Emilee Wallace (born September 19, 1989) is an American actress.

== Career ==
Wallace began her acting career in 2005. She has appeared in episodes of the television series Judging Amy (2005), Grey's Anatomy (2006), Cold Case (2008), Boston Legal (2008), Glee (2009, 2013), Ghost Whisperer (2010), Workaholics (2012), Rizzoli & Isles (2012−13). Apart from television work, she also appeared on the television films Company Town (2006) and Amish Grace (2010), and her first feature film Balls Out: Gary the Tennis Coach (2008).

== Filmography ==
=== Film ===
Year	Title	Role	Notes
2009	Balls Out: Gary the Tennis Coach	Jenny Tuttle	
2013	Pup	(voice)	

=== Television ===
Year	Title	Role	Notes
2005	Judging Amy	Regan Swope	"Revolutions Per Minute"
2006	Grey's Anatomy	Amelia Carver	"The Name of the Game"
2006	Company Town	Ronni Amberson	TV film
2008	Cold Case	Tamyra Borden (1998)	"Spiders"
2008	Boston Legal	Fiona	"The Bad Seed"
2009	Glee	Deaf Choir #9	"Hairography"
2010	Ghost Whisperer	TJ	"Dead Air"
2010	Amish Grace	Teacher Ruth	TV film
2012	Workaholics	Whitney	"Flashback in a Day"
2012–2013	Rizzoli & Isles	Cailin Martin	Recurring role
2013	Glee	Deaf Choir #11	"Love, Love, Love"

== Personal life ==
Wallace was born in Oklahoma City and raised in Edmond, Oklahoma. She currently resides in Los Angeles, California.
