= Bladestorm: The Hundred Years' War =

2007 video game

- Developer: Omega Force
- Publishers: Koei; Koei Tecmo (Nightmare)
- Director: Kenichi Ogasawara
- Designer: Shigeto Nakadai
- Programmer: Atsushi Miyauchi
- Artist: Nobuo Miyoshi
- Composer: Jamie Christopherson
- Platforms: PlayStation 3; PlayStation 4; Xbox 360; Xbox One; Windows
- Release: August 30, 2007: PlayStation 3, Xbox 360; JP: August 30, 2007 (PS3); JP: October 25, 2007 (X360); EU: November 2, 2007; NA: November 6, 2007; AU: November 15, 2007 Bladestorm: Nightmare PS3, PS4, Xbox One; JP: January 29, 2015; NA: March 17, 2015; AU: March 19, 2015; EU: March 20, 2015 Windows; WW: May 29, 2015
- Genre: Real-time tactics
- Mode: Single-player

Bladestorm: The Hundred Years' War is a 2007 real-time tactics video game developed by Omega Force and published by Koei for the PlayStation 3 and Xbox 360. An expanded remake, entitled Bladestorm: Nightmare was released by Koei Tecmo for the PlayStation 3, PlayStation 4, and Xbox One in Japan on January 29, 2015, and in March 2015 for the rest of the world. The worldwide Windows release was on May 29, 2015. The game is loosely based on the Hundred Years' War between the Kingdoms of England and France in the 14th and 15th centuries. Just like the Kessen and Musou series from Koei, certain liberties are taken from the original history. For example, unlike what happened in real life, it is possible to save Joan of Arc from being burned at the stake. The Nightmare edition features creatures like dragons and goblins in an alternate storyline.

== Plot ==
The game opens with a scene showing two anonymous mercenaries fighting each other during a clash between French and English troops. They converse as they fight, setting the tone of the game as they discuss the nature of mercenaries (who change sides as it suits them), how there is no real right or wrong in the war, and how time seems to be standing still (even though the game covers events across the entirety of the Hundred Years' War, the game does not strictly follow chronology; for example, the player can fight alongside Gilles de Rais in one battle and with John Chandos in the next).

The player character, a mercenary leader in the making, fights in battles to advance the plot. Much of the game's story comes from overheard conversations in the tavern between battles. While most missions do not contribute to the plot, the player will often be given the chance to fight in famous battles, typically on the side that historically won. These special battles are usually accompanied by cutscenes that build on the story arcs of the various characters in the game.

The story follows a large cast of characters both roughly historical and original. The two most prominent characters are Edward the Black Prince, introduced campaigning for England at the beginning of the game, and Joan of Arc, who is introduced fighting for France much later. Many of the game's characters are paired; for example, John Talbot and John Fastolf interact frequently with each other and their story arcs are entwined throughout the game, and Phillippe le Bon is always accompanied by his subordinate Marie.

The plot hinges on the key battles of Crécy, Poitiers, and Orléans. Unlike most special battles, the player must choose a side. Depending on the player's choices, either Joan or Edward offers a commission in their army for the climactic battle – Bordeaux for the French and Agincourt for the English.

== Gameplay ==
The player starts the game by creating a customizable mercenary character. The player character must lead squads of troops to be effective; unsupported, the mercenary is very vulnerable. Over the course of the game, the player will improve the character by acquiring better arms and armor, improving leadership abilities, and learning how to command numerous unit types.

The gameplay takes place on battlefields in different regions of France and the Low Countries. At first, the player can only fight in the Normandy region, but as the game progresses the player can eventually fight in Brittany, Flanders, Champagne, Aquitaine, Gascony, the Île-de-France, and Auvergne. Battles are broken down by days (which last 10 real-time minutes), during which time the player can fight as he or she chooses. The player's objective is to fulfill the contract he or she accepted for that particular battle, typically by capturing a number of strategic locations for his or her side. Fighting frequently for one side in a particular region will result in that side dominating the region; as this reduces the opportunities to for capturing locations and gaining experience, players are subtly discouraged from favoring one side too much and benefit from maintaining a rough parity between the French and English.

Each battlefield has villages, castles, and cities that can be captured. Each of these has a defense value; small villages have a value as low as three, while walled cities have a value of nine. The player can reduce this defense value to zero by defeating the troops defending the location or escorting allied troops in assaults on the location. Once the defense value reaches zero, the base commander appears. When the base commander is defeated, the location is captured. Each side also has a variety of skilled officers leading troops. Capturing locations and defeating officers rewards the player with loot.

Combat takes place when opposing forces attack each other, whether under player control or not. To prevail in battle, the player must make use of appropriate units and abilities to fit the situation. In addition to a standard attack, each squad has three special abilities; for example, sword-and-shield infantry can stun enemies with a shield bash, raise their shields to sacrifice mobility for frontal defense, and can use a brief heavy strike to unleash wide-sweeping high-damage attacks. Special abilities operate on cooldowns. The more the player uses a certain unit type, the more experience is gained for that unit type. Experience points can be used to upgrade the passive attributes and active abilities for those units.

The game includes a wide range of different warrior squads to command and recruit. The player can lead only one squad at a time, but may take command of any squad on the field unless it is a special base defense squad, already led by another officer, or is part of a unit type that the player has not yet learned to lead. At first, the player can only lead swordsmen, archers, and mounted warriors, but can find and purchase books that will let him or her lead other unit types. Unit types vary from historical (longbowmen, men-at-arms) to anachronistic (chariots) to foreign (ninjas, camels) to fantasy (magicians). Each unit type is broken down into a number of varying subtypes; for example, the Rapier group includes shield, two-handed, and dual-wielding squads, each with their own special abilities. Each unit type has a rock paper scissors relationship with other unit types. When the player has an extreme advantage over an opposing unit type, a greenish-blue light will appear over the enemy squad-leader's head. A reddish shadow indicates an extreme disadvantage. For example, cavalry are very effective against swordsmen, but can be defeated easily by pikemen.

Between battles, the player character spends time at a tavern which serves as a hub. Here, the player can converse with other mercenaries, purchase equipment from a merchant, recruit squads which can be called upon at any time in battle, and accept contracts.

== Reception ==
Reception

Aggregate scores
Aggregator	Score
GameRankings	(X360) 65.44% (PS3) 60.17%
Metacritic	(X360) 63/100 (PS3) 58/100 (PS4) 58/100 (XONE) 48/100

Review scores
Publication	Score
Destructoid	7.5/10
Edge	8/10
Electronic Gaming Monthly	4.67/10
Eurogamer	8/10
Famitsu	34/40 (Nightmare)
GamePro	3.5/5
GameRevolution	D
GameSpot	5/10
GameTrailers	8.3/10
GameZone	(X360) 6.6/10 (PS3) 6.2/10
IGN	6.5/10
Official Xbox Magazine (US)	7/10

The game met with mixed critical reception. GameRankings and Metacritic gave it a score of 65.44% and 63 out of 100 for the Xbox 360 version, and 60.17% and 58 out of 100 for the PlayStation 3 version.

Brett Todd of GameSpot gave the game a score of 5/10. He said that "Fresh ideas can't save [the game] from mediocrity." Some of his complaints were that the campaign "just recycles the same style of battles over and over again," there was "no strategic depth or arcade satisfaction," the game suffered from an "ineffective artificial intelligence," and "dated visuals and sound." On the positive side, he said that the game featured "easy-to-use controls for commanding companies of troops," and he thought the game had a "great idea to blend arcade action with squad combat."

However, Dave McCarthy of Eurogamer gave the X360 version a score of 8/10. McCarthy said "It's...a very, very good videogame: another brilliant evolution of Koei's unique interpretation of the real-time strategy genre, and every bit as satisfying as previous efforts. What it lacks in terms of the speed and immediacy of, say, Gundam Musou, it makes up for with strategic range, design ingenuity, and conceptual novelty."

== See also ==
- Kessen III
