= Violet McGraw =

American actress (born 2011)

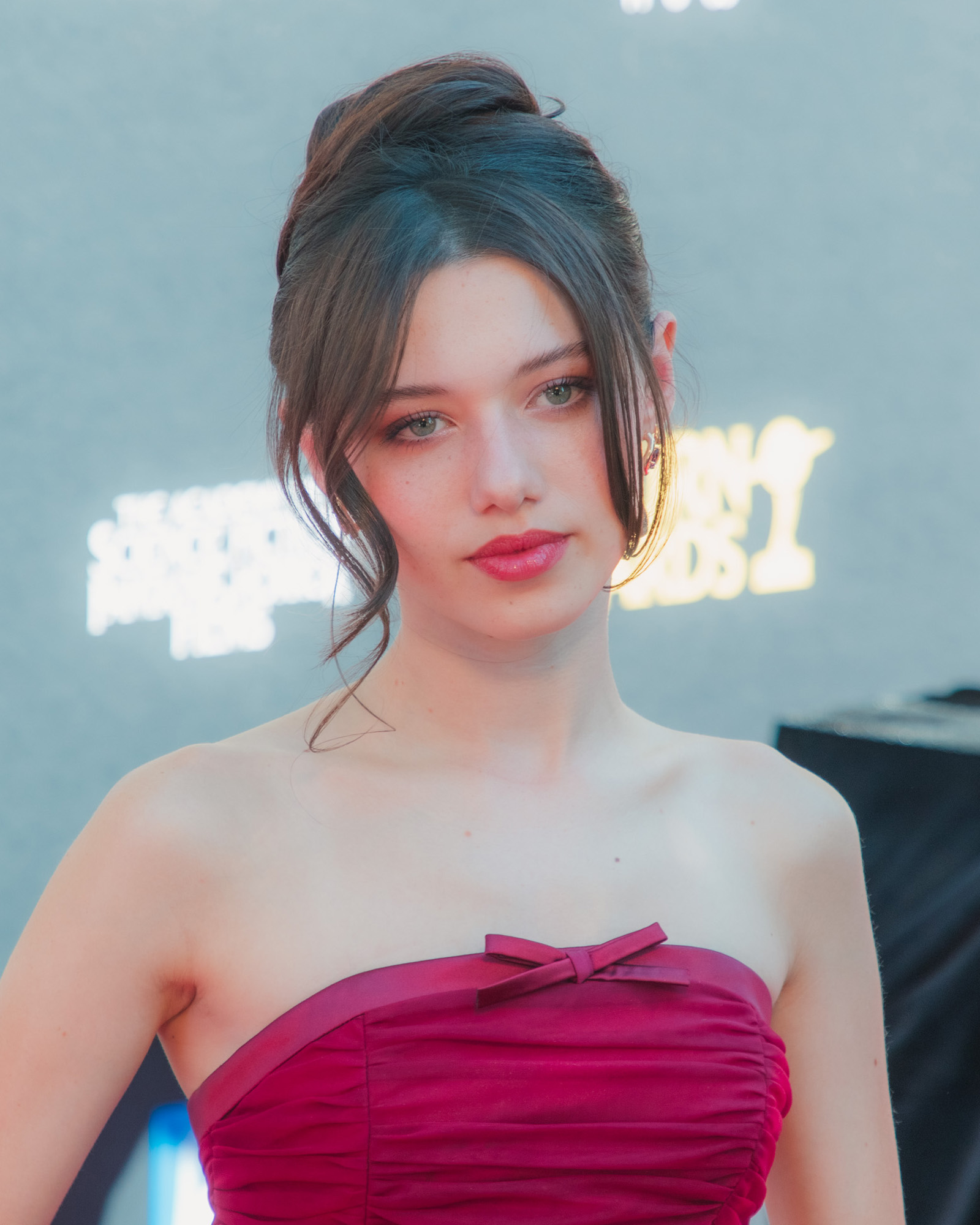
- McGraw in 2026
- Born: Violet Elizabeth McGraw; April 22, 2011 (age 15)
- Occupation: Actress
- Years active: 2016–present
- Relatives: Madeleine McGraw (sister)

Violet Elizabeth McGraw (born April 22, 2011) is an American actress. She started her career as a child actress, with the recurring role of Nina in the 2016 television series Love, and her first feature film was 2018's Ready Player One. In 2019 she was nominated for an OFTA Television Award for Best Ensemble in a Motion Picture or Limited Series for The Haunting of Hill House. She is also known for her roles as a young Yelena Belova in the Marvel Studios superhero films Black Widow (2021) and Thunderbolts* (2025), and as Cady in the horror films M3GAN (2022) and M3GAN 2.0 (2025).

== Career ==
Violet McGraw started acting at age 5. In 2016, McGraw made her acting debut in Reckless Juliets (2017) as Aria Morgan and the television series Love as Nina (2018). She was most known for roles of Alice in 2019's Jett, and her cameo scene as a child in a shopping cart in Steven Spielberg's 2018 blockbuster, Ready Player One. In 2018 she had her first major role as young Nell Crain, younger version of Victoria Pedretti's character, in Mike Flanagan's Netflix series, The Haunting of Hill House. She had been announced as part of the cast in September 2017. McGraw then went on to star in Drama film Our Friend (2019) as Evie Teague with supporting roles in Doctor Sleep (2019) as Violet and Bennett's War (2019). Based on her experiences in The Haunting of Hill House and Doctor Sleep, McGraw was able to give advice to her older sister Madeleine when the latter starred in the horror film The Black Phone.

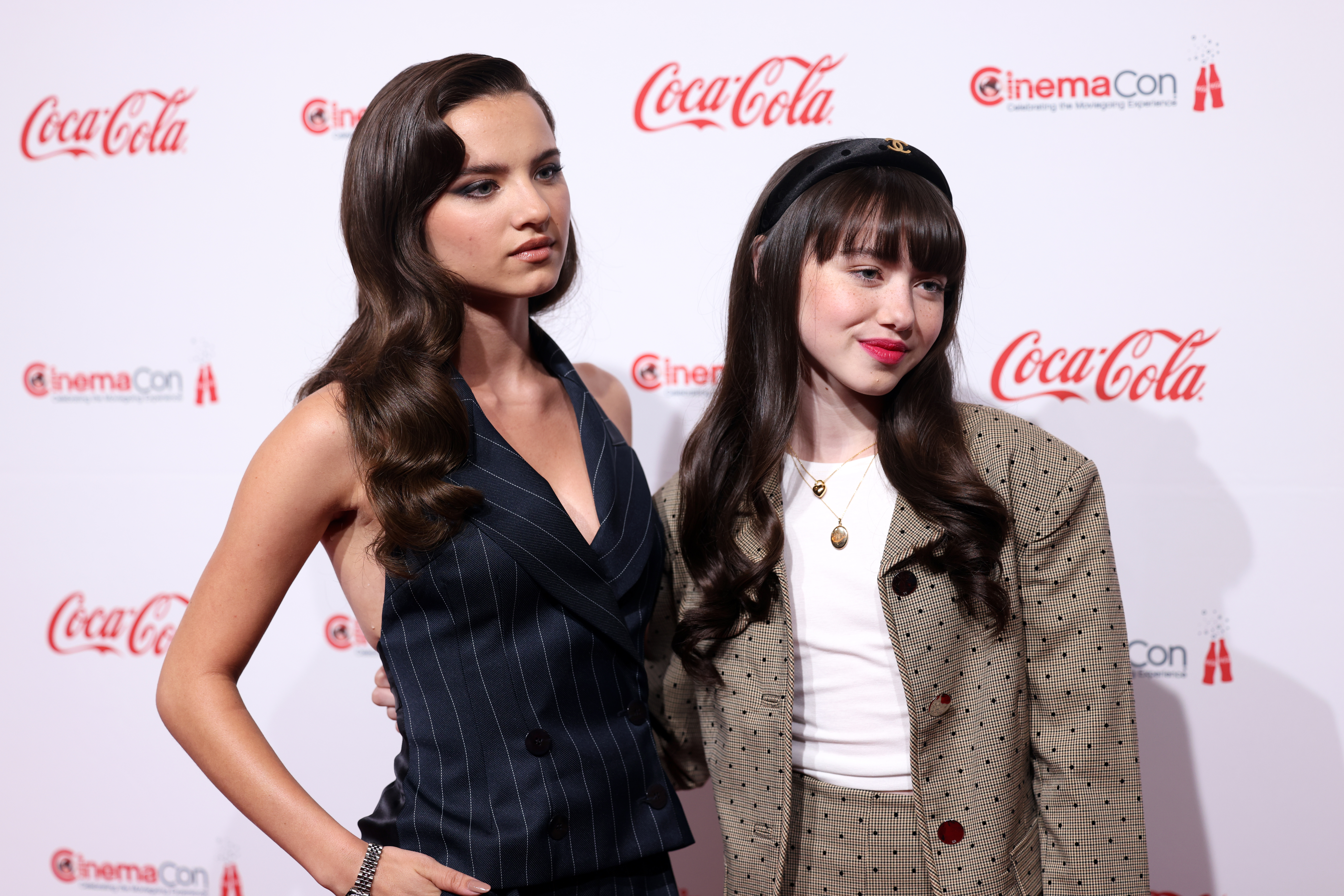
Violet McGraw with her sister Madeleine McGraw at CinemaCon 2025.

McGraw made her Marvel Cinematic Universe debut in 2021's Black Widow as a young Yelena Belova, with the adult version played by Florence Pugh. In 2025, she reprised the role in Thunderbolts*. In 2021, she also starred in Separation as Jenny Vahn, and in 2022 starred as Cady in the Universal Pictures technological action film M3GAN, for Blumhouse, reprising her role in M3GAN 2.0 on 2025. The Hollywood Reporter noted that McGraw and co-star Amie Donald "ended up becoming fast friends by the end of filming". In May 2023, McGraw was cast in A Wonderful Way with Dragons.

== Personal life ==
Violet McGraw was born on April 22, 2011. She is the youngest of four children. Her older siblings are all also actors: Jack McGraw of The Good Dinosaur, Aidan McGraw of American Sniper, and Madeleine McGraw, who portrays Gwen in The Black Phone.

== Filmography ==
=== Film ===
Key
†	Denotes films that have not yet been released

Year	Title	Role	Notes
2018	Ready Player One	Shopping Cart Kid	Uncredited
2019	Bennett's War	Rebecca	
2019	Our Friend	Evie Teague	
2019	Doctor Sleep	Violet	
2021	Separation	Jenny Vahn	
2021	Black Widow	Young Yelena Belova	
2022	A Christmas Mystery	Violet Pierce	
2022	I Believe in Santa	Ella	
2022	M3GAN	Cady James	
2024	The Life of Chuck	Lily	
2024	The Curse of the Necklace	Ellen Davis	
2025	Thunderbolts*	Young Yelena Belova	
2025	M3GAN 2.0	Cady James	
2026	Summer's Last Resort	Summer	
2026	Double Trouble	Willow	
2027	Anything but Ghosts †	TBA	Post-production

=== Television ===
Year	Title	Role	Notes
2018	The Haunting of Hill House	Young Eleanor "Nell" Crane	Main role
2019	Law & Order: Special Victims Unit	Bailey Shaw	1 episode
2019	Love	Nina	2 episodes
2019	Jett	Alice	Main role
