= John Heard (actor) =

American actor (1946–2017)

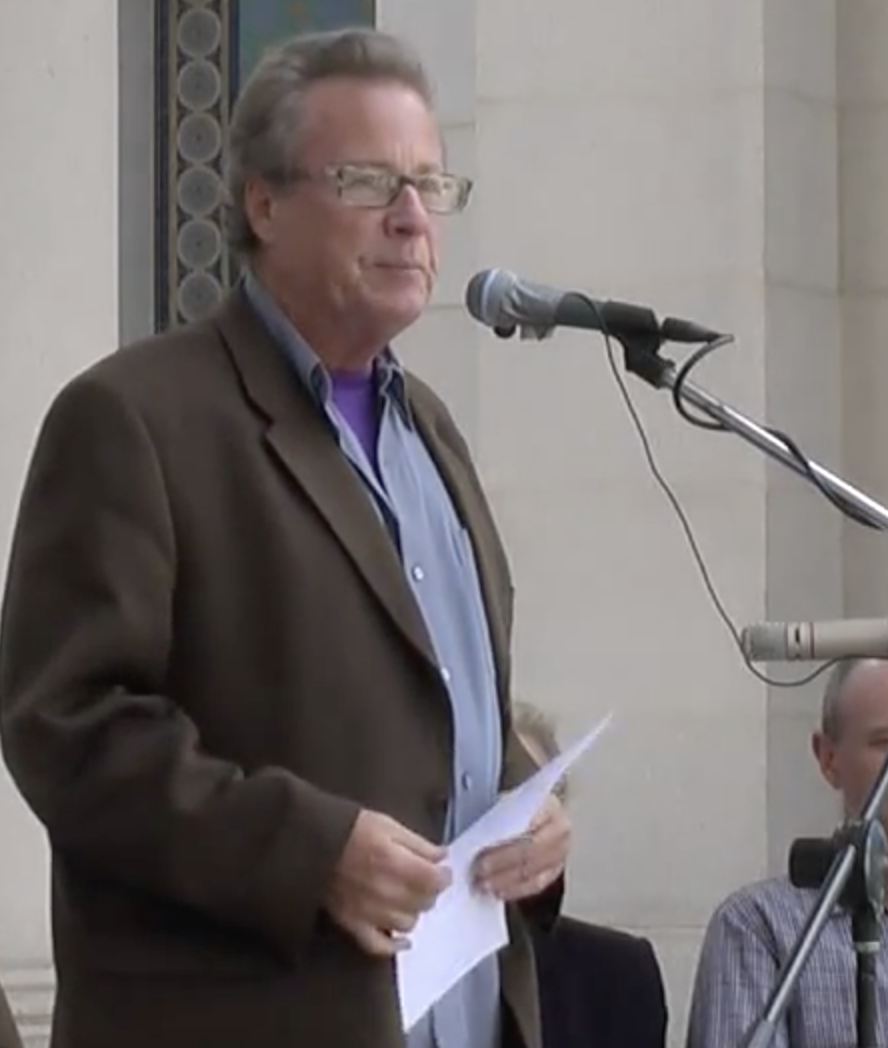
- Heard in 2010
- Born: John Matthew Heard Jr. March 7, 1946; Washington, D.C., U.S.
- Died: July 21, 2017 (aged 71); Palo Alto, California, U.S.
- Burial place: South Side Cemetery, Ipswich, Massachusetts, U.S.
- Education: Clark University (BA)
- Occupation: Actor
- Years active: 1974–2017
- Spouses: Margot Kidder (m. 1979; div. 1980); Sharon Heard (m. 1988; div. 1996); Lana Pritchard (m. 2010; div. 2010)
- Children: 3

John Matthew Heard Jr. (March 7, 1946 – July 21, 2017) was an American actor. He made his debut appearance in film with the ensemble cast of Between the Lines (1977). He appeared in a number of successful films, including Heart Beat (1980), Cutter's Way (1981), Cat People (1982), After Hours (1985), Beaches (1988), Deceived (1991), and as Peter McCallister in Home Alone (1990) and its sequel Home Alone 2: Lost in New York (1992). He was nominated for an Emmy Award in 1999 for his recurring role as corrupt police detective Vin Makazian on The Sopranos (1999–2004).

Other films include C.H.U.D. (1984), The Trip to Bountiful (1985), The Milagro Beanfield War (1988), Big (1988), Awakenings (1990), In the Line of Fire (1993), The Pelican Brief (1993), My Fellow Americans (1996), and White Chicks (2004). He was also known for his roles as Roy Foltrigg on The Client (1995–1996) and Governor Frank Tancredi on Prison Break (2005–2006).

== Early life and education ==
John Matthew Heard Jr. was born on March 7, 1946, in Washington, D.C., a son of Helen (née Sperling), who was involved in the arts and appeared in community theatre, and John Heard Sr., who worked for the office of the Secretary of Defense. He was raised as a Roman Catholic and attended Gonzaga College High School, Clark University (in Worcester, Massachusetts), and Catholic University of America. He grew up with two sisters, Lise and Cordis (an actress), and a brother, Matthew Heard, who predeceased his mother and father.

== Career ==
In the 1970s Heard appeared on the stage, in television, and in film. He appeared off-Broadway in 1974 in Mark Medoff's play The Wager and in 1975 as Guildenstern in Hamlet at the Delacorte Theatre in Central Park, where he also understudied Sam Waterston as Hamlet. That fall the production moved to the Vivian Beaumont Theater at Lincoln Center. He appeared at the Eugene O'Neill Theater Center in 1977 in a series of new plays. Heard won Obie Awards for his performances in Othello and Split between 1979 and 1980. He was the male lead in the 1979 film Head Over Heels (which was renamed and re-released as Chilly Scenes of Winter in 1982).

In 1980 Heard was in the film Heart Beat. In 1981 he had the starring role of Alex Cutter in the film Cutter's Way. Richard Schickel of Time, David Ansen of Newsweek, and New York City's weekly newspapers would write glowing reviews. Ansen wrote, "Under Passer's sensitive direction, Heard gives his best film performance: he's funny and abrasive and mad, but you see the self-awareness eating him up inside." In 1982 he played the lover of Nastassja Kinski, one of the main characters, in the remake of Cat People. He co-starred as photographer George Cooper in C.H.U.D. (Cannibalistic Humanoid Underground Dwellers, 1984) alongside future Home Alone co-star Daniel Stern and in The Trip to Bountiful (1985). In the comedy-drama Heaven Help Us (aka Catholic Boys, 1985) Heard played a monk named Brother Timothy. In After Hours (also 1985) Heard portrayed bartender Tom Schorr.

He appeared in the film The Milagro Beanfield War and had a significant role playing Paul, Tom Hanks's adult corporate competitor and jilted boyfriend of Elizabeth Perkins, in Big (both 1988). He co-starred with Bette Midler in Beaches (also 1988). In 1990 Heard starred in the philosophical film Mindwalk, in which three characters from different sociopolitical and cultural backgrounds express their opinions on the human experience, and worked alongside Robert De Niro and Robin Williams in Awakenings, and with Dyan Cannon in The End of Innocence. He starred with Goldie Hawn in Deceived (1991), playing Jack Saunders, and had a supporting role in Gladiator (1992) with Cuba Gooding Jr.

He played Daugherty in the film Radio Flyer (1992), FBI agent Gavin Vereek in The Pelican Brief (1993), and Vice President Ted Matthews in My Fellow Americans (1996). He starred with Samuel L. Jackson in 1997's One Eight Seven and was featured in the 2000 miniseries Perfect Murder, Perfect Town. He also appeared in the 2004 comedy film White Chicks.

=== Home Alone and sequel ===
In 1990 Heard starred as Peter McCallister in the John Hughes comedy production Home Alone. He played the part of a father who unwittingly leaves his son Kevin (played by Macaulay Culkin) at home when the family embarks on their Christmas trip to France. Heard chose to characterize the role with a combination of the dramatic concern of a father missing his son along and more classic comedic tropes. The film was one of the biggest hits of 1990, and he reprised his role in the sequel Home Alone 2: Lost in New York.

=== Television ===
Heard featured in a television production of The Scarlet Letter (1979) as Arthur Dimmesdale. He played real-life Ku Klux Klan leader D. C. Stephenson in the television miniseries Cross of Fire (1989) and the role of David Manning in the ABC miniseries adaptation of Shirley MacLaine's Out on a Limb, a memoir of her journey toward acceptance of spiritual and extraterrestrial realities. From 1995 to 1996 he played the role of Roy Foltrigg in the television series The Client. Heard also had roles on The Sopranos as the troubled corrupt detective Vin Makazian, for which he received an Emmy nomination as Outstanding Guest Actor, and later on Battlestar Galactica as Commander Barry Garner.

He had recurring roles on CSI: Miami (as Kenwall Duquesne, father of Calleigh Duquesne) and Prison Break (as Frank Tancredi, governor of Illinois and father of Sara Tancredi). Among other film and television roles in the 2000s and 2010s, he played the mayor of Chicago on two episodes of the Fox series The Chicago Code.

=== Legacy ===
In 2008 Heard was asked about his career and he replied,

I guess I went from being a young leading man to being just kind of a hack actor. ... When I came to Hollywood, I was pretty much a stage actor, and I expected everybody to be quiet. And they weren't. They were doing their job, and you're expected to do your job, and you're sort of this ongoing co-existence. I was a little bit of an arrogant jerk. Now, it's a little bit more like, "Okay, I realize you have to pat me down with powder every three seconds." And I stand there, and I'm a little more tolerant ... I think I had my time. I dropped the ball, as my father would say. I think I could have done more with my career than I did, and I sort of got sidetracked. But that's OK, that's all right, that's the way it is. No sour grapes. I mean, I don't have any regrets. Except that I could have played some bigger parts.

== Personal life ==
Heard married actress Margot Kidder in 1979, but the union was dissolved after only six days.

In 1987 he had a son with actress and former girlfriend Melissa Leo. Heard was arrested in 1991 and charged with third-degree assault for slapping Leo. In 1997 he was found guilty of trespassing at Leo's home but was acquitted of charges of trespassing at their son's school.

From his marriage to Sharon Heard he had two children, a son and a daughter. Their son died on December 6, 2016, aged 22.

On May 24, 2010, Heard married Lana Pritchard in Los Angeles. The couple divorced seven months later.

== Death ==
Heard died from cardiac arrest due to atherosclerotic and hypertensive heart disease on July 21, 2017, at the age of 71. He was found dead by staff in a hotel in Palo Alto, California, where he was reportedly recovering from minor back surgery which he had just undergone at Stanford University Hospital. The back surgery did not play a role in his death. His cause of death was confirmed by the Santa Clara County Medical Examiner's office. He was buried in South Side Cemetery in Ipswich, Massachusetts.

== Filmography ==
=== Film ===
Year	Title	Role	Notes
1977	Between the Lines	Harry Lucas	
1977	First Love	David Bonner	
1978	Rush It	Byron	
1978	On the Yard	Paul Juleson	
1979	Chilly Scenes of Winter	Charles Richardson	
1980	Heart Beat	Jack Kerouac	
1981	Cutter's Way	Alex Cutter	
1982	Cat People	Oliver Yates	
1984	C.H.U.D.	George Cooper	
1984	Best Revenge	Charlie	
1984	Violated	Skipper	
1985	Too Scared to Scream	Sid, Lab Technician	
1985	Heaven Help Us	Brother Timothy	
1985	After Hours	Tom Schorr	
1985	The Trip to Bountiful	Ludie Watts	
1987	Dear America: Letters Home from Vietnam	Johnny "Johnny Boy" (voice)	Documentary
1988	The Telephone	Telephone Man	
1988	The Milagro Beanfield War	Charlie Bloom	
1988	The Seventh Sign	Reverend	
1988	Big	Paul Davenport	
1988	Betrayed	FBI Agent Mike Carnes	
1988	Beaches	John Pierce	
1989	The Package	Colonel Glen Whitacre	
1990	Blown Away	Charlie	
1990	Mindwalk	Thomas Harriman	
1990	The End of Innocence	Dean	
1990	Home Alone	Peter McCallister	
1990	Awakenings	Dr. Kaufman	
1991	Rambling Rose	Willcox Hillyer	
1991	Deceived	Frank Sullivan / Jack Saunders / Dan Sherman	
1992	Radio Flyer	Officer Jim Daugherty	
1992	Gladiator	John Riley	
1992	Waterland	Lewis Scott	
1992	Home Alone 2: Lost in New York	Peter McCallister	
1993	In the Line of Fire	Professor Riger	
1993	Me and Veronica	Frankie	
1993	The Pelican Brief	Gavin Verheek	
1996	Before and After	Wendell Bye	
1996	My Fellow Americans	Vice President Ted Matthews	
1997	One Eight Seven	Dave Childress	
1997	Executive Power	Walker	
1997	Men	George Babbington	
1997	Silent Cradle	Dr. Brittain	
1998	Snake Eyes	Gilbert Powell	
1998	Desert Blue	Professor Lance Davidson	
1999	Jazz Night	John Little	Short
1999	The Secret Pact	Jerome Carver	
1999	Fish Out of Water	Gregor	
1999	Freak Weather	David	
2000	Animal Factory	James Decker	
2000	The Photographer	Marcello	
2000	Pollock	Tony Smith	
2001	The Boys of Sunset Ridge	John Burroughs	
2001	O	Dean Bob Brable	
2001	Dying on the Edge	John Fuller	
2002	Researching Raymond Burke	Raymond Burke	Short
2002	Fair Play	Owen	Short
2004	Mind the Gap	Henry Richards	
2004	White Chicks	Warren Vandergeld	
2004	My Tiny Universe	Bobby	
2004	Under the City	Scova	
2005	The Chumscrubber	Officer Lou Bratley	
2005	Edison	Captain Brian Tilman	
2005	The Deal	Professor Roseman	
2005	Tracks	The Prison Warden	
2005	Sweet Land	Minister Sorrensen	
2006	Steel City	Carl Lee	
2006	Gamers: The Movie	Gordon's Dad	
2006	The Guardian	Captain Frank Larson	
2007	Dead Lenny	Dr. Robert Hooker	
2007	The Great Debaters	Sheriff Dozier	
2007	Brothers Three: An American Gothic	Father	
2008	P.J.	Dr. Alan Shearson	
2008	Justice League: The New Frontier	Ace Morgan (voice)	
2008	The Lucky Ones	Bob	
2009	Red State Blues	Fritz	Short
2009	Formosa Betrayed	Tom Braxton	
2009	Little Hercules in 3-D	Coach Nimms	
2010	The Truth	Jonathan Davenport	
2010	Ivan's House	Ivan	Short
2011	Whisper Me a Lullaby	"Poppy"	
2012	The Legends of Nethiah	Nethiah's Father	
2012	A Perfect Ending	Mason Westridge	
2012	Stealing Roses	Walter	
2012	Would You Rather	Conway	
2013	The Insomniac	Paul Epstein	
2013	Assault on Wall Street	Jeremy Stancroft	
2013	Snake and Mongoose	Wally Parks	
2013	Runner Runner	Harry Furst	
2013	Torn	Detective Kalkowitz	
2013	Buoyancy	Frank	Short
2014	Warren	Jack Cavanee	
2014	Animals	Albert	
2014	Boys of Abu Ghraib	Sam Farmer	
2014	The Nurse	Frank	
2014	One More Day	Tom	Short
2015	Boiling Pot	Tim Davis	
2016	Is That a Gun in Your Pocket?	Sheriff Parsons	
2016	After the Reality	Bob	
2016	Jimmy Vestvood: Amerikan Hero	J.P. Monroe	
2016	So B. It	Thurman Hil	
2017	Searching for Fortune	Michael Denton Sr.	
2017	Counting for Thunder	Garrett Stalworth	
2017	Pray for Rain	Markus Gardener	
2017	Last Rampage	Blackwell	Posthumous release
2018	The Tale	Older Bill Allens	Posthumous release
2018	Living Among Us	Andrew	Posthumous release
2019	Imprisoned	Police Chief	Posthumous release

=== Television ===
Year	Title	Role	Notes
1984	Kate & Allie	Max McArdle	Episode: "A Weekend to Remember"
1985	Tales from the Darkside	Billy Malone	Episode: "Ring Around the Redhead"
1985	Alfred Hitchcock Presents	Bill Callahan	Episode: "Breakdown"
1986	Miami Vice	Laurence Thurmond	Episode: "One Way Ticket"
1987	The Equalizer	Ron Parrish	Episode: "In the Money"
1989	Screen Two	Michael Johnson	Episode: "Virtuoso"
1994–1999	Law & Order	Mitch Burke / Walter Grobman	2 episodes
1995	American Masters	Montresor	Episode: Edgar Allan Poe: Terror of the Soul
1995	The Outer Limits	Paul Stein	Episode: "Dark Matters"
1995–1996	The Client	District Attorney Roy "Reverend Roy" Foltrigg	21 episodes
1999–2004	The Sopranos	Detective Vin Makazian	5 episodes
2001	Law & Order: Criminal Intent	Larry Wiegert	Episode: "The Pardoner's Tale"
2002	Touched by an Angel	Allen	Episode: "Secrets and Lies"
2002	Law & Order: Special Victims Unit	Gregory Rossovitch / Peter Sipes	Episode: "Disappearing Acts"
2002	Hack	Paul Ballinger	Episode: "Songs in the Night"
2003–2005	CSI: Miami	Kenwall Duquesne	4 episodes
2004–2005	Jack & Bobby	Dennis Morgenthal	5 episodes
2005	Numb3rs	Peter Houseman	Episode: "Soft Target"
2005–2006	Prison Break	Governor Frank Tancredi	10 episodes
2006	Battlestar Galactica	Commander Barry Garner	Episode: "The Captain's Hand"
2007	Cavemen	Tripp	Episode: "Her Embarrassed of Caveman"
2007–2010	Entourage	Richard Wimmer	2 episodes
2008	My Own Worst Enemy	Peter	Episode: "Down Rio Way"
2009	The Beast	Dr. Blake	Episode: "Mercy"
2009	Southland	Ben Sherman Sr.	2 episodes
2010	Gravity	B.C.	3 episodes
2011	The Chicago Code	Mayor McGuinness	2 episodes
2013	Perception	Congressman Evan Rickford	2 episodes
2013	Adam DeVine's House Party	Dregory	Episode: "Dregory"
2013	Tim & Eric's Bedtime Stories	Lawyer	Episode: "Haunted House"
2014	CSI: Crime Scene Investigation	Roger Ridley	Episode: "Love for Sale"
2014	Modern Family	Gunther Thorpe	Episode: "The Feud"
2014	Person of Interest	Roger McCourt	Episode: "Death Benefit"
2014	Mistresses	Bruce Sappire	Episode: "Coming Clean"
2014	NCIS: Los Angeles	Michael Thomas	3 episodes
2016	Elementary	Henry Watson	Episode: "Miss Taken"
2017	MacGyver	Arthur Ericson	Episode: "Pliers"
2017	APB	Joe Reeves	Episode: "Daddy's Home"
2017	Outsiders	Lieutenant Governor of Kentucky	Episode: "What Must Be Done"

==== TV films, miniseries, and specials ====
Year	Title	Role
1975	Valley Forge	Mr. Harvie
1979	The Scarlet Letter	Reverend Arthur Dimmesdale
1983	Will There Really Be a Morning?	Clifford Odets
1983	Legs	Dan Foster
1985	Tender is the Night	Abe North
1987	Out on a Limb (book)	David Manning
1988	Necessity	Charlie
1989	Cross of Fire	David "D.C." Stephenson
1992	Dead Ahead: The Exxon Valdez Disaster	Dan Lawn
1993	There Was a Little Boy	Gregg
1994	In Spite of Love	Andrew
1994	Because Mommy Works	Ted Forman
2000	Perfect Murder, Perfect Town	Larry Mason
2000	The Wednesday Woman	Bill Davidson
2001	The Big Heist	Detective Richard Woods
2002	Monday Night Mayhem	Roone Arledge
2002	The Pilot's Wife	Jack Lyons
2003	Word of Honor	Dr. Steven Brandt
2005	Locusts	Dr. Peter Axelrod
2006	Twenty Questions	C. Colin Whitworth
2006	The Line-Up	Walter Clark
2008	Skip Tracer	Con Colbert
2008	Generation Gap	Principal Winters
2010	The Quickening	Ed Erlich
2011	Too Big to Fail	Joe Gregory
2013	Sharknado	George
2015	The Lizzie Borden Chronicles	William Almy
2015	The Murder Pact	John LaSalle

== Awards and honors ==
Source unless otherwise noted:

- 1977 Theatre World Award for his performance in G.R. Point
- 1976–77 Obie Award, Best Performance, G.R. Point
- 1979–80 Obie Award, Best Performance, Othello and Split
- 1999 Emmy Award nomination, Outstanding Guest Actor in a Drama Series (1999)

In 2003, he was inducted into the Gonzaga College High School Theatre Hall of Fame.
