= Who Is Clark Rockefeller? =

2010 television film by Mikael Salomon

- Film poster
- Written by: Edithe Swensen
- Directed by: Mikael Salomon
- Starring: Eric McCormack; Sherry Stringfield
- Theme music composer: Jeff Toyne
- Country of origin: United States
- Original language: English

Production
- Producers: Edithe Swensen; John M. Eckert
- Cinematography: John Dyer
- Editor: Michael D. Ornstein
- Running time: 120 minutes
- Production company: Sony Pictures Television

Original release
- Network: Lifetime
- Release: March 13, 2010

Who Is Clark Rockefeller? is a 2010 American police procedural television film starring Eric McCormack as Christian Gerhartsreiter and Sherry Stringfield as Sandra Boss. The film is based on the life of Christian Gerhartsreiter, a German con artist who for years impersonated many people, at one point claiming to be part of the Rockefeller family going by the faux name "Clark Rockefeller". It was directed by Mikael Salomon and written by Edithe Swensen.

Filming took place in Toronto in October 2009 and premiered on the Lifetime network on March 13, 2010, to mixed reviews.

== Premise ==
Christian Karl Gerhartsreiter, also known as "Clark Rockefeller," was a master imposter who successfully posed as various individuals, including a television host and a Pentagon advisor, before claiming to be a member of the famous Rockefeller family. He used his fabricated high society status to win the affections of Sandra Boss, a wealthy businesswoman, and the two eventually married and had a child. However, their relationship ended in divorce and custody battles, leading Clark to abduct their daughter. The incident ultimately exposed Clark's fraudulent past and raised questions about his true identity and the extent of his deception.

== Cast ==
- Eric McCormack as Christian Gerhartsreiter/Clark Rockefeller, a German con artist. In order to prepare for the role, McCormack read everything about Gerhartsreiter's case, studied Natalie Morales's jailhouse interview, and also read his Vanity Fair profile. McCormack said, "The dialogue in the scene was based on public record".
- Sherry Stringfield as Sandra Boss, Gerhartsreiter's ex-wife, a millionaire with a Harvard MBA and a partner at McKinsey & Company.
- Emily Alyn Lind as Reigh 'Snooks' Boss, Gerhartsreiter and Sandra's daughter
- Stephen McHattie as Mark Sutton, an FBI detective
- Regina Taylor as Megan Norton, an FBI detective
- Ted Atherton as Det. John Ryan
- Krista Bridges as Agent Susan Pascale
- Mark Taylor as Detective Mike Ruggio
- Philip Akin as Det. Lewis Cook
- Art Hindle as William Boss
- Janet Porter as Julia Boss
- Jeffrey R. Smith as Max Bernard
- Jack Grinhaus as Lawrence Jones
- Carleigh Beverly as Meredith

== Reviews ==
The film was met with mixed reviews. Brian Lowry of Variety said, "Who Is Clark Rockefeller? plays a bit like The Great Imposter, only with a woman caught up in the 'She's young, beautiful — and she married a con man!' scenario in the best Lifetime tradition. Sherry Stringfield stars as the hapless gal, whose character would be more sympathetic if she hadn't agreed to call her daughter 'Snooks'." He went on to praise McCormack's performance by saying, "But the real kitsch factor resides in Eric McCormack's performance as the suave charmer, which adds an element of high camp to the proceedings. Mike Hale of The New York Times said in his review that, "As a mystery and a police procedural, Who Is Clark Rockefeller? attains glossy mediocrity, but every few minutes Mr. McCormack shows up and says something like, 'You were tedious about money when I married you, and you're still tedious,' and it feels like Will & Grace all over again." He went on to praise Stringfield's performance by saying, "[she] gives a dignified, believable performance as Sandra Boss."
