= Tom Williamson (actor) =

American actor (born 1990)

- Born: Thomas S. Williamson III; 1990 (age 35–36); Washington, D.C.
- Education: University of Southern California; Bristol Old Vic Theatre School
- Occupation: Actor
- Years active: 2012–present

Thomas S. Williamson III (born 1990) is an American actor best known for his recurring role as AJ Hensdale on the Freeform drama, The Fosters.

== Early life and education ==
Williamson was born Thomas S. Williamson III in Washington, D.C., the son of Tom Williamson and Shelley Brazier. He is one of four children. His father was a senior attorney at Covington & Burling, a prestigious law firm in D.C. He attended Gonzaga College High School where he played basketball, track and field and participated in the musical theatre program. Williamson graduated in 2008. He attended the University of Southern California and graduated in 2012 with a degree in communications and media studies.

== Career ==
In 2013, Williamson appeared in the horror film All Cheerleaders Die, a remake of Lucky McKee's 2001 film. The film marked his featured film debut. In October 2014, Williamson was one of 20 actors to participate in the ABC Network's 34th annual Talent Showcase. In April 2015, it was announced that Williamson had been cast in the recurring role of AJ in the ABC Family series, The Fosters. Williamson appeared opposite Sharon Stone in the 2017 release, Running Wild.

== Filmography ==
Film
Year	Film	Role	Notes
2013	All Cheerleaders Die	Terry Stankus	
2014	Dark Nights	Adam	
2014	Collision	Charlie	
2016	Bus Driver	Holden	
2017	Running Wild	Debrickshaw Smithson	
2017	No Way to Live	Monty	
2018	Five Piece	Adrian	
2019	VFW	Shaun Mason	
2020	Run Hide Fight	Mr. Coombs	
2024	Snow Valley	Ed	
Television
Year	Title	Role	Notes
2013	Criminal Minds	James Barfield	Episode: "Restoration"
2013	Counseling Crazy	Mikey	Web series
2013	So Awkward	Chaz	Web series; Season 1, Episode 6
2014	Switched at Birth	Kip	Episode: "The Past (Forgotten-Swallowed)"
2014	The Goldbergs	Dwayne Martin	Episode: "Love Is a Mix Tape"
2015	K.C. Undercover	Prince Promomomo	Episode: "Daddy's Little Princess"
2015–2018	The Fosters	AJ Hensdale	Recurring role; 35 episodes
2016	Rizzoli & Isles	Gary Carver	Episode: "Shadow of Doubt"
2017	NCIS	Stoddard	Episode: "Something Blue"
2017	Code Black	Russell Danvers	Episode: "The Devil's Workshop"
2017	Hello Cupid: Farrah	Justin	Short film
2017	Sexless	Justin	Episode: "The Farrah Episode"
2017	Idiotsitter	TBD	4 episodes
2017	BSU: Black Student Union	Andre	4 episodes
2018	Yappie	Andre	Episode: "Affinity War"
2019	Blue Bloods	Malik Taylor	Episode: "Disrupted"
2022	SHELL	Darius	Miniseries
