= Searching for Fortune =

- Directed by: Joseph Matarrese
- Written by: Brian Smolensky
- Story by: Brian Smolensky
- Produced by: Phillip Matarrese; Mandi Reno
- Starring: Brian Smolensky; Christina Moore; John Heard
- Cinematography: Anthony C. Kuhnz
- Edited by: Art Freed
- Music by: Ben Musser
- Production company: Distant Thunder Films
- Release date: March 14, 2017 (Queens World Film Festival)
- Running time: 87 minutes
- Country: United States
- Language: English

Searching for Fortune is a 2017 American independent drama directed by Joseph Matarrese and starring Brian Smolensky, Christina Moore and John Heard.

== Cast ==
- Brian Smolensky as Michael Denton Jr.
- Christina Moore as Emily
- John Heard as Michael Denton Sr.
- Tom Costello as Nick
- Michael Kripchak as Tom
- Aaron Munoz as Steve
- Sam Munoz as Sal Burkowitz
- Vanessa Bednar as Bo
