= Warriors: Legends of Troy =

2011 video game

- Developer: Koei Canada
- Publisher: Tecmo Koei
- Director: Hiroshi Kadowaki
- Producer: Akihiro Suzuki
- Designer: Fumiya Kato
- Programmer: Kenji Hiruta
- Writers: Mario Azzopardi; Jason Bond
- Composer: Jamie Christopherson
- Series: Dynasty Warriors
- Platforms: PlayStation 3 Xbox 360
- Release: PlayStation 3: NA: March 8, 2011; EU: March 18, 2011; JP: May 26, 2011; Xbox 360: EU: March 18, 2011; JP: May 26, 2011
- Genre: Hack and slash
- Modes: Single-player, multiplayer

Warriors: Legends of Troy, released in Japan as Troy Musou (TROY(トロイ)無双, Toroi Musō), is a 2011 hack and slash video game developed by Koei Canada and published by Tecmo Koei for the PlayStation 3 and Xbox 360. It is set during the Trojan War. While having a Warriors title, the game differs from the Dynasty Warriors series as it features a greater level of graphic violence.

== Gameplay ==
The gameplay is heavily influenced or similar by its mother series, Dynasty Warriors. It utilizes the same combos of hack-and-slash gameplay, but with several modifications. The player controls characters from a third-person perspective and is required to face large numbers of enemies. The player is able to use their shield as a weapon and also use throwing weapons such as javelins and boulders, and is able to pick up other soldiers and use them as weapons. The trademark Musou attack from the series is replaced by "Fury", which boosts the player's attacks instead of dealing a powered up special attack. The "Normal" and "Charge" attacks are also replaced by three types of attacks: Quick Attack, Focused Attack, and Stun Attack. As the player slays through enemies, they are awarded Kleos, the currency for the game. Kleos can be used to purchase rare items for use. Collecting Kleos during gameplay is also the only way for the player to restore health, as unlike Dynasty Warriors, there are no recovery items on the battlefield. Like the Fist of the North Star: Ken's Rage series, it features a much larger amount of blood and gore than some other Dynasty Warriors games.

The game features various gameplay modes. The story mode is similar to the one found in Dynasty Warriors 7, as it is divided into two major stories (for the Greeks and the Trojans) that offer predetermined characters for the player to use. While the game retells the events of the Trojan War, it also dramatizes certain aspects of history. Challenge Mode offers three challenges: Arena (defeating continuous waves of enemies), Rampage (collecting as many Kleos as possible without getting hit), and Bloodlust (collecting Kleos to restore gradually-depleting health). The game supports online co-op and competitive play for up to four people.

The game features eight playable characters who participate in the Trojan War, both on the side of the Greeks and the Trojans. The side of the Greeks features Achilles, Ajax, Odysseus, and Patroklos, while the side of the Trojans features Aeneas, Hektor, Paris, and Penthesilea. There are also unique NPCs that participate in the battlefield, such as Agamemnon, Hippolyte, Menelaos, and Priam, as well as those who do not, such as Andromache, Helen, Kassandra, and Poseidon.

== Development ==
The game's developers went on research expeditions to archaeological sites in the Aegean world. Locations in the game look like actual landscapes where Troy was believed to be.

== Release ==
The game had a scheduled release date of Q4 2010 in all regions but was pushed back to Q1 2011 after Koei's announcement during Tokyo Game Show 2010.

== Reception ==
Reception

Aggregate score
| Aggregator | Score |
|---|---|
| Metacritic | (PS3) 44/100 (X360) 54/100 |

Review scores
| Publication | Score |
|---|---|
| Destructoid | 4/10 |
| GamesRadar+ | 2.5/5 |
| IGN | 6/10 |
| VentureBeat | 6.5/10 |

Warriors: Legends of Troy received "generally unfavorable" reviews for PlayStation 3 and "mixed or average" reviews for Xbox 360. IGN awarded it a score of 6 out of 10, saying "with a few friends and the right attitude, Warriors: Legends of Troy can be fun." James Stephanie Sterling of Destructoid awarded it a score of four out of 10, saying "Warriors of Troy just about delivers some simple button mashing action without too much fuss, but hack n' slash fans would do best to wait for Dynasty Warriors 7." PlayStation LifeStyle awarded it a score of 3 out of 10, saying "While the game can be fun in spurts, there are plenty of better options on the market should you feel the need to mash some buttons. Unless you are dying for a taste of Greek mythology or [are] extremely bored, this is one game you won't be sorry you missed." GamesRadar gave the title 2.5 stars out of 5, praising the kill animations, Fury mode, and setting, while criticizing the shallow combat, tedious objectives, and wasted potential.
