= Snow Valley (film) =

2024 psychological thriller film by Brandon Murphy

- Official poster
- Directed by: Brandon Murphy
- Written by: Brandon Murphy
- Produced by: Rachel Whitney; Chris Abernathy; Aaron B. Koontz; Justice Laub
- Starring: Cooper van Grootel; Tom Williamson; David Lambert; Barbara Crampton; Rachel Michiko Whitney; Paige Elkington; Ali Fumiko Whitney
- Cinematography: Tommy Oceanak
- Edited by: Colleen Halsey; Zach Wolf
- Music by: Jamie Biden
- Production companies: Paper Street Pictures; Ulinta Productions
- Distributed by: Gravitas Ventures
- Release date: March 26, 2024 (United States)
- Country: United States
- Language: English

Snow Valley is a 2024 American psychological thriller film written and directed by Brandon Murphy.

The film was released on VOD on March 26, 2024, by Gravitas Ventures.

== Premise ==
A newly engaged couple's ski weekend gets interrupted when an unexpected guest arrives and supernatural forces begin to awaken.

== Cast ==
- Cooper van Grootel as Heath Jacobson
- Tom Williamson as Ed
- David Lambert as Brannon
- Barbara Crampton as Ellen
- Rachel Michiko Whitney as Laura Pell
- Paige Elkington as Anna
- Ali Fumiko Whitney as Kiko

== Production ==
Snow Valley was announced on May 19, 2021, when Cooper van Grootel, Tom Williamson, David Lambert, Barbara Crampton, Rachel Michiko Whitney, and Paige Elkington joined the cast.

In March 2024, Gravitas Ventures acquired the distribution rights to the film.

=== Post-production ===
The film entered post-production by January 2022, after Murphy's death.

== Release ==
Snow Valley was released on VOD on March 26, 2024, by Gravitas Ventures.

=== Critical response ===
Nathaniel Muir of Aipt Comics gave the film a negative review, writing that it "never finds rhythm". Tyler Doupe of Dread Central also wrote a negative review, summarizing that the film "never congeals", while Kevin Wetmore of Horror Buzz felt it was "uninteresting and clichéd" and Chris Catt, writing for Creepy Catalog, thought the film "never comes together".
