= Born to Race (2011 film) =

2011 film by Alex Ranarivelo

- Directed by: Alex Ranarivelo
- Produced by: George Shaimei; Ali Afshar; Chevonne O’Shaughnessy
- Starring: Joseph Cross; John Pyper-Ferguson; Nicole Badaan; Brando Eaton; Sherry Stringfield; Spencer Breslin
- Production company: ESX Entertainment
- Distributed by: American Cinema International
- Release date: December 31, 2011
- Running time: 98 minutes
- Country: United States
- Language: English

Born to Race is a 2011 direct-to-video action film directed by Alex Ranarivelo, and stars Joseph Cross and John Pyper-Ferguson.

== Plot ==
Born to Race is the story of Danny Krueger, a rebellious young street racer on a collision course with trouble. After an accident at an illegal street race, he is sent to a small town to live with his estranged father, a washed up NASCAR racer. Attending high school, Danny meets Jessica. She invites him to a party. Attempting to integrate, Danny accepts the invitation. At the party, Danny runs into the local hot shot Jake Kendall. The two characters clash. Jake rules the neighborhood fiercely, and Danny will have to live up to those standards in order to become accepted, which means that he shall have to race again.

Meanwhile the relationship between Danny and his father has its own ups and downs. Danny cannot get over the fact that his father left him and his mother when he was still a young child. In his struggle to find his ways in his new hometown, he cannot get around his father, and through dialogue the two slowly come to realize that they have more in common then they suspected. When Danny decides to enter the NHRA High School Drags, he is forced to seek his father's help in taking down his rival Jake Kendall. Danny and Jake both advance to the finals. In the finals, Danny narrowly wins the race after Jake is injured in a fiery crash.

== Cast ==
- Joseph Cross as Danny Krueger
- John Pyper-Ferguson as Frank Krueger
- Brando Eaton as Jake Kendall
- Nicole Badaan as Jessica Dalton
- Sherry Stringfield as Lisa Abrams
- Spencer Breslin as Max
- Christina Moore as Ms. Parker
- Erik King as Mr. Briggs
- Johanna Braddy as Rachel
- Matt McCoy as Joe
- Grant Show as Jimmy Kendall
- Rehan Khan as Bona
- Chelsea Heath as Andrea Faust
- Michael Esparza as Sanchez
- Ali Afshar as Himself
- Whitmer Thomas as Harry
- Paul J. Alessi as Kendall Mechanic

== Sequel ==
A sequel, Born to Race: Fast Track, was released in 2014. Brett Davern and Beau Mirchoff replaced Cross and Eaton as Danny Krueger and Jake Kendall respectively, while Bill Sage replaces Pyper-Ferguson as Frank Krueger. Badaan and Show reprise their roles as Jessica Dalton and Jimmy Kendall respectively.

Set one year after the events of Born to Race, Danny wins a scholarship to the prestigious Fast Lane Racing Academy and finds himself competing against some of the fiercest young drivers in the world. Tension soars on and off the track and a terrible incident leaves Danny without a racing partner. Facing dismissal from the academy, he is forced to team up with Jake Kendall. The pair must learn to set aside their differences as they vie for rookie spots on a professional racing team.
