= John Ducey =

American actor (born 1969)

- Born: John Joseph Ducey; January 21, 1969 (age 57); Endwell, New York, U.S.
- Occupation: Actor
- Years active: 1994–present
- Spouse: Christina Moore (m. 2008)

John Joseph Ducey (born January 21, 1969) is an American actor.

== Early life ==
Ducey was born in Endwell, New York and graduated from Seton Catholic Central High School in 1987. He was an active member of the student body and remains an active member of the alumni groups.

== Career ==
Ducey's "every man" look has led him to play often a "perfect boyfriend" or "perfect dad" on several shows, including Roseanne, Caroline in the City, and the 1998 revival of Fantasy Island. Ducey has also appeared in several films, including Deep Impact. He worked with Michael Jordan doing motion capture work as several Looney Tunes characters in 1996's Space Jam. He also appeared on Wings and on the fifth season of Frasier as a waiter in the episode "Room Service" for which many fans believe he deserved an Emmy for Outstanding Guest Actor in a Comedy Series.

He was a series regular on Oh, Grow Up (Alan Ball's ABC sitcom prior to Six Feet Under), playing the role of Ford, and had recurring roles as Leonard on the WB's Sabrina, the Teenage Witch (in addition to a guest appearance several years earlier), and Jack's station manager Jamie on Will & Grace. Ducey made a brief appearance on Malcolm in the Middle, in episode No. 119, as a lawyer giving Hal the will to the Wilkersons' neighbors. Since 2003, he has appeared on According to Jim, Scrubs, Joey, Freddie, Hot Properties, My Name Is Earl, Desperate Housewives, How I Met Your Mother, Rules of Engagement, iCarly, and Hot in Cleveland. He played Tom Lucas, the brothers' dad, on the Disney show Jonas in season one. He has worked on Drake & Josh as the husband of a couple who has stayed in the Drake and Josh Inn. He also played Dr. Donald Spaulding in The Suite Life Movie. He and wife Christina Moore starred together in the 2022 holiday film I Believe in Santa, which he wrote.

== Personal life ==
Ducey's maternal grandfather was the baseball player, Johnny Dickshot.

On July 5, 2008, Ducey married actress Christina Moore.
