= The Dog Lover =

- Poster
- Directed by: Alex Ranarivelo
- Written by: Ali Afshar; Alex Ranarivelo
- Produced by: Tag Mendillo; Mandli Reno
- Starring: Allison Paige; James Remar; Lea Thompson; Jayson Blair; Christina Moore
- Cinematography: Rueden Steinberg
- Edited by: Brett Hedlund
- Music by: Jamie Christopherson
- Release date: July 8, 2016
- Running time: 101 minutes 102 minutes
- Country: United States
- Language: English

The Dog Lover is a 2016 American drama film written by Alex Ranarivelo and Ali Afshar, directed by Ranarivelo and starring Allison Paige, James Remar, Lea Thompson, Jayson Blair and Christina Moore.

== Plot ==
The film depicts an idealistic college student sent undercover by an animal welfare organization to investigate a puppy mill, and eventually becoming disillusioned with the welfare organization, which is presented as unethical.

== Cast ==
- James Remar as Daniel Holloway
- Lea Thompson as Liz Holloway
- Jayson Blair as Will Holloway
- Michael King as Trevor
- Christina Moore as Cassie Sumpter
- Ali Afshar as Raymond
- Annabelle Kavanagh as Abigail Holloway
- Cullen Douglas as Vincent Bogel
- Matthew Glave as Mr. Gold
- Kathleen Wilhoite as Mrs. Gold
- Sherry Stringfield as Jackie McConnell
- Allison Paige as Sara Gold

== Release ==
The film was released on July 8, 2016.

== Reception ==
The film has a 20% rating on Rotten Tomatoes based on 10 reviews. Glenn Kenny of RogerEbert.com awarded the film two stars out of four.

Owen Gleiberman of Variety gave the film a positive review and wrote, "Rescue-dog purists may not approve of the line The Dog Lover takes, yet to this dog lover it comes off as compassionate and realistic: a plea for a place where good care can become common sense."

Frank Scheck of The Hollywood Reporter gave the film a negative review and wrote, "...it’s all as clunkily melodramatic as it sounds, with the climactic trial sequences proving particularly slow going."
