= Sherry Stringfield =

American actress (born 1967)

- Born: June 24, 1967 (age 59); Colorado Springs, Colorado, U.S.
- Occupation: Actress
- Years active: 1989 - 2017
- Children: 2

Sherry Lea Stringfield (born June 24, 1967) is an American actress. She is best known for playing the role of Dr. Susan Lewis on the NBC medical drama ER, a role for which she received three Emmy Award nominations. Stringfield was a member of ER's original cast, but she quit the show during its third season, despite being contractually tied to appear in five. She returned to the role in 2001, and quit once again in 2005. She is also known for her regular roles on NYPD Blue and Guiding Light.

She has acted mainly on television, but she has also played various parts in films.

== Career ==
=== Early career ===
She got her first role on the CBS Daytime soap opera Guiding Light, playing Christina "Blake" Thorpe from 1989 until 1992. After three years, she left the show to spend a year traveling in Europe, but she soon returned to television on the ABC drama, NYPD Blue. She played Manhattan Assistant District Attorney Laura Kelly, the ex-wife of officer John Kelly (David Caruso) during the first season (1993–94) of the series. Unsatisfied, she was released early from her contract.

=== ER ===
Stringfield was one of the original cast members of NBC's medical drama, ER. Her personal success mirrored the show's success — she was nominated for an Emmy Award for lead actress during each of her first three seasons of the show. Stringfield was contractually tied to appear in five seasons of ER; however a desire for a normal life and to escape ER's grueling filming schedule prompted her to leave the drama early in its third season. In order to be released from her contract, Stringfield was forced to sign a no-work agreement, which blocked her from working on television for the remainder of her original contract. Stringfield's decision to quit reportedly angered the show's executive producer, John Wells, because she left just as Dr. Lewis got embroiled in a budding romance with Anthony Edwards' Dr. Mark Greene. Stringfield commented, "I wouldn't describe the situation as pleasant. The producers were in shock. They tried to talk me out of it. It took a long time to get out of my contract."

Stringfield's much publicized departure reportedly "sent a small shock wave through Hollywood" and her exit episode in November 1996 attracted 37 million viewers, the biggest night of the season for the NBC network. Stringfield quit just as television executive Dick Robertson was closing a deal that guaranteed the ER cast millions in future earnings from sales to cable and syndication, meaning she effectively "walked away from a fortune".

Stringfield claims she was asked to reprise the role of Susan Lewis in ER several times, but turned each offer down. However, following the birth of her daughter, she approached the producers of ER and then rejoined the cast in 2001, the show's eighth season. "I changed my mind," Stringfield commented. "I really want to work now. It just made sense for me to go back to ER." The 26.7 million people who watched Stringfield's return placed the show first in the ratings.

During her second stint in ER, Stringfield's character was featured in a special crossover with NBC's New York City based police drama, Third Watch, which aired in 2002; she remained in the role for four additional seasons. However in August 2005, Stringfield announced that she would be leaving the show again as the 12th season came underway. "I am extremely grateful for the time I spent on ER," Stringfield explained. "It is a wonderful show, and there are so many people I will miss. But I'm ready for new roles and new challenges." In 2009, Stringfield returned to ER for the series finale "And in the End...".

=== Other work ===
After leaving ER in 1996, Stringfield taught a script analysis class and directed several plays at her alma mater. She took roles in films such as 54 (1998) and Autumn in New York (2000) and appeared in the television movies Border Line (1999) — produced by her ER co-star Anthony Edwards — and Going Home (2000), in which she starred opposite Jason Robards. She also guest-starred in the CBS drama Touched by an Angel in 1999.

In 2005, Stringfield was cast alongside Michael Michele, Blair Underwood, Esai Morales, Gary Cole and Catherine Bell in the pilot episode of the CBS drama Company Town (created by Elwood Reid; directed by Thomas Carter), playing Angie Amberson, a mother of teenagers and a whistle-blower on the investment firm where she works. Company Town failed to get picked up for the 2006 fall season. The series was produced by Jack Clements and Larry Sanitsky. In 2007 Stringfield starred in the Andrew Shea film Forfeit. She played the role of Karen, the ex-girlfriend of a clinical sociopath who schemes and plots to stage a massive robbery and sets Karen up to take the rap.

In 2007, Stringfield guest-starred as attorney Nora March in the CBS drama Shark. She also played a recurring role in the HBO drama Tell Me You Love Me (previously known as Sexlife), which also aired in 2007.In 2009, she appeared in The Stepfather, a remake of the 1987 American thriller film of the same name.

She appeared in an episode of the USA Network drama In Plain Sight. Stringfield also guest-starred on Law & Order in late 2008 as a ruthless court clerk and Michael Cutter's love interest. She also played Mary Jane Porter, an old girlfriend of Larry David's who runs into and then goes on a date with him in an episode of Curb Your Enthusiasm that aired on October 11, 2009.

In 2010, Stringfield appeared in Who Is Clark Rockefeller? playing the role of Sandra Boss.

In addition to acting, Stringfield has done voice-over work, including the voice of Eyeleen in the children's television show Blue's Clues and voicing her ER character for the PC game ER: The Game. Stringfield was also featured in the U.S. Got Milk? advertising campaign, despite being lactose intolerant.

In 2012, Stringfield starred in The Confession, a Hallmark Channel movie and a sequel to The Shunning.

In November 2013, Stringfield guest-starred in the CBS police drama CSI: Crime Scene Investigation in season 14: episode 8 titled "Helpless", playing swing shift CSI Dawn Banks. In 2014, Stringfield played a recurring role on the CBS mystery Under the Dome during its second season.

In 2017, Stringfield appeared on Criminal Minds spinoff, Criminal Minds: Beyond Borders as the wife of Gary Sinise's character, Jack Garrett.

=== Awards and nominations ===
In 1991 and 1993, Stringfield was nominated in the "Outstanding Villain/Villainess" category at the Soap Opera Digest Awards for her role in Guiding Light. She has also received multiple awards and award-nominations for her role as Susan Lewis in ER, including three separate Emmy Award nominations in the category "Outstanding Lead Actress in a Drama Series" in 1995, 1996 and 1997. In 1995 she was nominated in the category "Favorite Female Performer" at the People's Choice Awards and in 1995 and 1996 she was nominated in the "Best Performance by an Actress in a TV-Series -Drama" category at the Golden Globe Awards.

In 1996, she won a Q Award for "Best Actress in a Quality Drama Series" and in 1997 she, along with several of her ER cast-mates, won a Screen Actors Guild Award for "Outstanding Performance by an Ensemble in a Drama Series". In addition Stringfield was voted one of the "100 Sexiest Women in the World" by readers of FHM magazine in 1997.

== Personal life ==
Stringfield was born in Colorado Springs, Colorado. In the early 1990s Stringfield dated British businessman Paul Goldstein (chairman of Nevica skiwear) for nearly three years, but the pressures of a long-distance romance eventually ended the relationship.

She married journalist Larry Joseph in 1998, with whom she had 2 children; a daughter Phoebe, born in 2001, and a son Milo, born in 2004. The couple separated in 2006 and eventually divorced.

== Filmography ==
=== Film ===
Film
Year	Title	Role	Notes
1995	Burnzy's Last Call	Jackie	
1998	54		
2000	Autumn in New York	Sarah Volpe	
2001	Viva Las Nowhere	Marguerite	
2007	Forfeit	Karen	
2009	The Stepfather	Leah	
2011	Born to Race	Lisa Abrams	Direct-to-video
2015	Going Clear: Scientology & the Prison of Belief	Sara Northrup	Voice; Documentary
2016	The Dog Lover	Jackie O'Connell	

=== Television ===
Television
Year	Title	Role	Notes
1989–1992	Guiding Light	Blake Marler	Contract role
1993–1994	NYPD Blue	Laura Michaels Kelly	22 episodes
1994–1996; 2001–2005; 2009	ER	Dr. Susan Lewis	142 episodes Screen Actors Guild Award for Outstanding Performance by an Ensemble in a Drama Series (1996-1997); Viewers for Quality Television Award for Best Actress in a Quality Drama Series (1996); Nominated—Golden Globe Award for Best Actress – Television Series Drama (1996-1997); Nominated—Primetime Emmy Award for Outstanding Lead Actress in a Drama Series (1995-1997); Nominated—Screen Actors Guild Award for Outstanding Performance by an Ensemble in a Drama Series (1995)
1999	Border Line	Allison Westlin	Television movie
1999	Touched by an Angel	Major Josephine Saunders	Episode: "Godspeed"
2000–2001	Blue's Clues	Dr. Eyeleen	2 episodes
2002	Third Watch	Dr. Susan Lewis	Episode: "Unleashed"
2007	Shark	Nora March	2 episodes
2007	Tell Me You Love Me	Rita	6 episodes
2008	In Plain Sight	Marci Allen	Episode: "Who Shot Jay Arnstein?"
2008	Law & Order	Carly	Episode: "Zero"
2009	Curb Your Enthusiasm	Mary Jane Porter	Episode: "The Hot Towel"
2010	Who Is Clark Rockefeller?	Sandra Boss	Television movie
2010	Night and Day	Elizabeth Hollister	Television movie
2011	The Shunning	Laura Mayfield-Bennett	Television movie
2011	Criminal Behavior	Molly Collins	Television movie
2012	Hornet's Nest	Molly West	Television movie
2013	The Confession	Laura Mayfield Bennett	Television movie
2013	CSI: Crime Scene Investigation	Dawn Banks	Episode: "Helpless"
2014	Runaway	Miranda	Television movie
2014	Under The Dome	Pauline Rennie	Recurring; 9 episodes
2016–2017	Criminal Minds: Beyond Borders	Karen Garrett	Recurring; 4 episodes

=== Video games ===
Video games
Year	Title	Role	Notes
2005	ER: The Game	Susan Lewis	Voice
