= American Wrestler: The Wizard =

- Theatrical poster
- Directed by: Alex Ranarivelo
- Screenplay by: Brian Rudnick
- Story by: Ali Afshar; Brian Rudnick
- Based on: Childhood of Ali Afshar
- Produced by: Ali Afshar; Hadeel Reda
- Starring: William Fichtner; Jon Voight; Ali Afshar; Gabriel Basso; Kevin G. Schmidt; Lia Marie Johnson; George Kosturos
- Cinematography: Reuben Steinberg
- Edited by: Brett Hedlund
- Music by: Jamie Christopherson
- Production company: ESX Productions
- Distributed by: ESX Entertainment; Warner Bros. Pictures
- Release dates: April 23, 2016 (Newport Beach Film Festival); May 3, 2017
- Running time: 117 minutes
- Country: United States
- Language: English

American Wrestler: The Wizard is a 2016 American sports biographical film directed by Alex Ranarivelo. The film centers around the world of competitive high school wrestling and stars George Kosturos as Ali Jahani, a 17–year old who escapes Iran in the 1980s after the Iran hostage crisis and must adjust to life in a small California town only to face more hostility due to the hostage crisis. William Fichtner, Jon Voight, Ali Afshar, Gabriel Basso, Kevin G. Schmidt and Lia Marie Johnson also star in supporting roles.

== Cast ==
- George Kosturos as Ali Jahani
- William Fichtner as Coach Plyler
- Ali Afshar as Hafez Tabad
- Lia Marie Johnson as Kristi Larsen
- Gabriel Basso as Jimmy Petersen
- Sasha Feldman as Dan 'Toad' Webster
- Chase Mowen as Mike Thornhill
- Kevin G. Schmidt as Roman Knox
- Nicholas Guilak as Pasha
- Shannon Collis as Wendy

== Production ==
=== Development ===
The idea for American Wrestler: The Wizard is heavily inspired by producer Ali Afshar who took up wrestling in his high school after fleeing from his home country of Iran due to the political outrage in the 1970s. Speaking on his take of biographical films, Ali stated that he wanted to show that any tough situation can have a positive impact no matter what the outcome. He wanted to emphasise the demeanour of how one's loss can actually be turned into a win.

Majority of the filming took place in Petaluma, California, with scenes being shot at Casa Grande High School (which was renamed to East Petaluma High School for the film), as well as Tomales high school for hallway scenes, cafeteria scenes, as well as the gymnasium being used for some wrestling scenes. Some scenes were also shot in Santa Rosa mainly in the Sonoma County area.

=== Music ===
Jamie Christopherson who previously worked on Metal Gear Rising: Revengeance and The Crow: Wicked Prayer composed the film's score. Christopherson used a blend of traditional orchestra and synths and worked with Iranian musicians. He also co-composed the film's theme song titled "Rise" with Armenian-Iranian singer, Andy featuring American singer Shani Rigsbee.

== Release ==
The film premiered at the Newport Beach Film Festival on April 23, 2016 and had a limited theatrical run starting May 3, 2017.

== Accolades ==
Event	Date of ceremony	Category	Recipients and nominees	Result	Ref(s)
Austin Film Festival	25 October 2016	Heart of Film	Brian Rudnick	Won	
Boston Film Festival	22 Sep 2016	Best Film	Alex Ranarivelo, Ali Afshar and Hadeel Reda	Won	
Boston Film Festival	22 Sep 2016	Best Ensemble Cast	Jon Voight, William Fichtner, George Kosturos, Ali Afshar; Gabriel Basso, Lia Marie Johnson, Kevin G. Schmidt; Nicholas Guilak, Sasha Feldman and Salome Azizi	Won	
Boston Film Festival	22 Sep 2016	Best Screenplay	Brian Rudnick	Won	
Boston Film Festival	22 Sep 2016	Breakout Performance	George Kosturos	Won	
Napa Film Festival	12 November 2016	Favourite Actor	George Kosturos	Won	
Napa Film Festival	12 November 2016	Special Jury Award – Best Performance in a Lounge Feature Film	George Kosturos	Won	
Napa Film Festival	12 November 2016	Favorite Narrative Feature	American Wrestler: The Wizard	Won	
Newport Beach Film Festival	23 April 2016	Honor Award for Outstanding Achievement in Filmmaking	Alex Ranarivelo	Won	
Newport Beach Film Festival	23 April 2016	Jury Award for Best Actor	George Kosturos	Won	

== Sequel ==
The sequel titled American Wrestler: The Fighter was announced by producers Forrest Lucas and Ali Afshar. Principal photography began in North Carolina in June 2017. George Kosturos returns to star with Tommy Flanagan, Bryan Craig, Sean Patrick Flanery and Parviz Sayyad joining as new cast members.
