= Running Wild (2017 film) =

- DVD cover
- Directed by: Alex Ranarivelo
- Written by: Christina Moore; Brian Rudnick
- Produced by: Ali Afshar; Forrest Lucas; Christina Moore
- Starring: Sharon Stone; Tommy Flanagan; Jason Lewis; Dorian Brown; Tom Williamson; Christina Moore
- Cinematography: Reuben Steinberg
- Edited by: Brett Hedlund
- Music by: Jamie Christopherson
- Production company: ESX Entertainment
- Distributed by: SP Distribution
- Release date: February 10, 2017 (United States)
- Running time: 99 minutes
- Country: United States
- Language: English

Running Wild is an American drama film directed by Alex Ranarivelo and written by Christina Moore and Brian Rudnick. In addition to Moore who also appears in the film, it also stars Sharon Stone, Tommy Flanagan, Jason Lewis, Dorian Brown, Tom Williamson. Principal photography began on August 17, 2015, in Napa, California. It was released on February 10, 2017.

== Plot ==
Stella Davis, a widow who saves her ranch by working with convicts to rehabilitate a herd of wild horses that wandered on to her property. Stella must fight prejudice, greed, bureaucracy and vanity (including her own) to finally understand that there is no better remedy to misfortune than helping another living creature.

== Cast ==
- Sharon Stone as Meredith Parish
- Tommy Flanagan
- Jason Lewis as Brannon Bratt
- Dorian Brown as Stella Davis
- Tom Williamson
- Christina Moore

== Production ==
On July 29, 2015, it was announced that Alex Ranarivelo would direct the Horse drama film Running Wild based on the script by Brian Rudnick. Forrest Lucas and Ali Afshar would produce the film through ESX Entertainment, and the banner would also finance the film. On August 18, 2015, Sharon Stone signed on to play the main villain role in the film as Meredith, while the script was done by Christina Moore and Rudnick, and Moore would also co-produce the film. On August 19, 2015, Dorian Brown and Tommy Flanagan joined the film, Brown to play the lead role of a widow Stella Davis, fighting to save her ranch from a herd of wild horses by working with convicts, while Flanagan to play the leader of the convicts. On August 20, 2015, Jason Lewis joined the cast to play the male lead.

Principal photography on the film began on August 17, 2015, in Napa, California.

== Reception ==
The film received mixed reviews. Sandie Angelo Chen of Common Sense Media wrote, "despite the filmmakers' overtly anti-activist agenda, this drama is well acted and has a couple of surprisingly empowering messages," and Brian Orndorf of Blu-ray.com called it "unusual", writing "Running Wild isn’t sharp entertainment, but it’s surprisingly convincing, carried along by accomplished performances, a cozy rural atmosphere, and a deep concern for the plight of the American horse." However, Gary W. Goldstein wrote in the Los Angeles Times that the film "takes a largely simplistic, heavy-handed approach to a potentially deep and vital story," with "shoddy storytelling" overwhelming a strong performance by Sharon Stone.

== See also ==
- List of films about horses
