= Forrest Lucas =

American businessman (1942–2025)

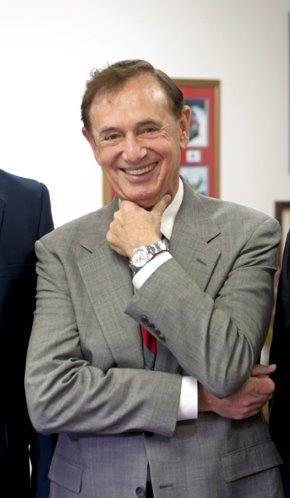
- Lucas in 2011
- Born: February 1, 1942; Ramsey, Indiana, U.S.
- Died: August 23, 2025 (aged 83)
- Political party: Republican
- Spouse: Charlotte Lucas (m. 1982)
- Children: 7

Forrest Lucas (February 1, 1942 – August 23, 2025) was an American businessman, known for being the founder of Lucas Oil and the founder of Protect the Harvest that opposed animal rights legislation.

== Early life ==
Lucas was born in February 1942, in Ramsey, Indiana, where he grew up, the eldest of four children. His parents Raymond and Marie had a small farm in Elkinsville, where he and his three sisters lived in "rural deprivation".

He was educated to a high school level.

== Career ==
Lucas bought his first truck when he was 19, and his first semi-trailer at 21. He got a job with Mayflower Transit. He built up a fleet of 13-14 trucks, and started freight brokerage. Following the deregulation of freight in 1980, he was the first to get a full licence to deliver freight in 48 states.

In 1988, he founded Lucas Oil. In 2018, he founded Forrest Films, a film production company.

== Protect the Harvest ==
Lucas was a founder of Protect the Harvest, a nonprofit organization which opposes animal rights. It is particularly opposed to the Humane Society of the United States, which it claims is "a wealthy and successful attack group".

== Personal life and death ==
His first wife "couldn't stand to save money ... she'd spend it as fast as I made it", and they divorced in 1969.

He married Charlotte Lucas in 1982, and they had seven children.

Lucas died on August 23, 2025, at the age of 83.
