= Alex Ranarivelo =

French filmmaker

- Born: Saint-Jean-d'Angely, France
- Occupation: Filmmaker

Alex Ranarivelo is a French filmmaker known for his sports dramas.

== Early life ==
He was born into a French-Malagasy family in Saint-Jean-d'Angely, France. His great-grandfather, a Malagasy man, married his great-grandmother, a white woman, in 1910. His family's history would later inspire him to direct several films based around race such as Dirt and The Ride. Ranarivelo moved to the United States when he was 6 years old. He studied film at the Art Center College of Design in Pasadena, California.

== Career ==
After making his feature film debut with the rough-and-tumble romantic comedy from a male perspective Alpha Males Experiment (aka Knuckle Draggers), Ranarivelo was hired to direct the action film Born to Race, which he co-wrote with fellow Art Center alum Steven Sarno.

When producer Ali Afshar and executive producer Forrest Lucas created ESX Entertainment, Ranarivelo was brought on to direct their first film, the suspenseful, character-driven The Dog Lover (starring James Remar, Lea Thompson, and Sherry Stringfield). Next came American Wrestler: The Wizard, which follows a 17-year-old Iranian refugee who becomes the high school wrestling champion against adversity during the Iran hostage crisis of 1980. In this period piece, Ranarivelo directed Jon Voight, William Fichtner and discovered newcomers George Kosturos and Lia Marie Johnson. The film won multiple awards on the festival circuit including "Best Picture" and "Best Ensemble" at the Boston Film Festival, the audience award at the Austin Film Festival and the audience award at the Napa Film Festival.

Next came Running Wild, where Ranarivelo was at the helm of drama about a California Ranch socialite poised to lose everything who creates a Prison Rehabilitation Equine Program after finding starving wild horses on her property. The film stars Sharon Stone, Dorian Brown and Jason Lewis.

In October 2015, Ranarivelo directed Jane Seymour and Paul Rodriguez in Pray for Rain, a murder mystery set against the backdrop of the Central California drought. A young girl begins to investigate the suspicious circumstances surrounding her father's death and discovers that the idyllic farm community of her youth has been replaced by crime and desperation. The films stars Annabelle Stephenson and Nicholas Gonzalez.

Ranarivelo returned to the motorsports world for Dirt, his fifth movie with ESX Entertainment. Dirt is about a weathered race team owner (Kevin Dillon) who can't quite get his team to gel when he is asked to take on a kid from the hood that needs a work furlough to avoid jail time. He reluctantly agrees and the unlikely pair create quite a stir in the redneck sport of short course off-road truck racing.

Ranarivelo also directed The Ride, about a troubled boy from a Neo-Nazi family who is sent to a juvenile detention center after stabbing his dad and ends up being fostered by an interracial couple. The film is based on the true story of Scottish BMX rider John Buultjens.

== Filmography ==
Year	Title	Functioned as			Notes
Year	Title	Director	Editor	Screenwriter	Notes
2009	Alpha Males Experiment	Yes	Yes	Yes	Directorial debut
2011	Born to Race	Yes	No	Yes	
2012	Ultimate Armored Car: The Presidential Beast	No	Yes	No	
2012	Staged	Yes	Yes	No	TV series, 1 episode
2014	Born to Race: Fast Track	Yes	No	Yes	
2016	American Wrestler: The Wizard	Yes	No	No	
2016	The Dog Lover	Yes	No	No	
2017	Running Wild	Yes	No	No	
2017	Pray for Rain	Yes	No	No	
2018	Dirt	Yes	No	Yes	
2018	The Ride	Yes	No	Yes	
2019	Bennett's War	Yes	No	Yes	
2021	Born a Champion	Yes	No	Yes	
2022	That's Amor	No	Yes	No	
2022	A Christmas Mystery	Yes	No	No	
2022	A Hollywood Christmas	Yes	No	No	TV Movie
2022	I Believe in Santa	Yes	No	No	
