= Christina Moore =

American actress (born 1973)

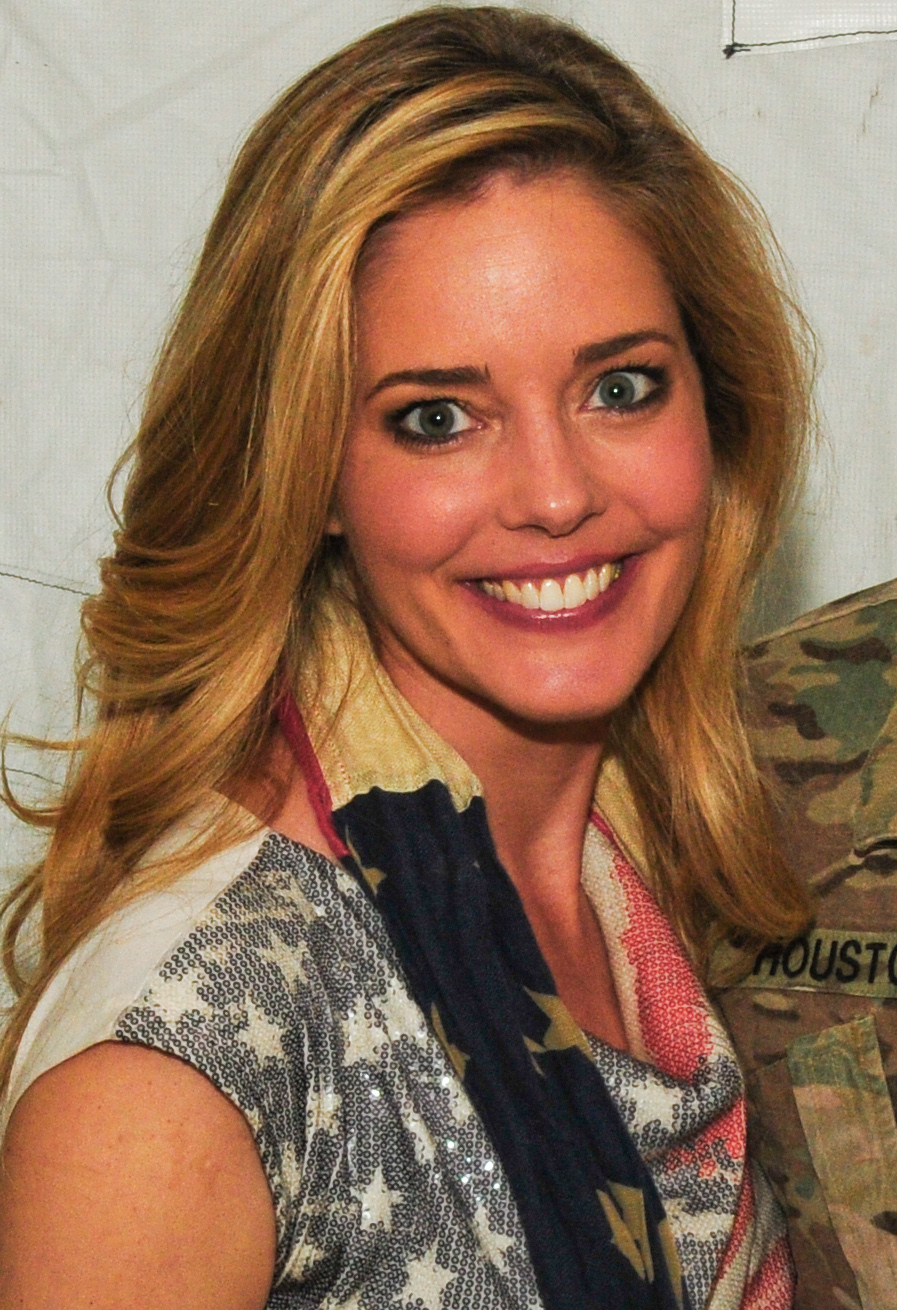
- Moore in 2014
- Born: April 12, 1973 (age 53); Palatine, Illinois, U.S.
- Occupation: Actress
- Years active: 1996–present
- Spouse: John Ducey (m. 2008)

Christina Moore (born April 12, 1973) is an American actress. She is best known for her recurring roles as Laurie Forman on the sixth season of the Fox period comedy series That '70s Show (2003–04), Tracy Clark on The CW teen drama series 90210 (2008–13), Suzanne McKittrick on the fourth and fifth seasons of the HBO fantasy horror series True Blood (2011–12), Christina Ross on the Disney Channel comedy series Jessie (2011–2015), and Mandy Heiser on the first three seasons of the TNT comedy drama series Claws (2017–2019).

Moore is also known for her lead role as Nurse Candy Sullivan on the TNT medical drama series Hawthorne (2009–2011), and was a recurring cast member on the eighth season of the Fox sketch comedy series Mad TV (2002–03).

== Early life ==
Moore was born in Palatine, Illinois. She became interested in performing as a young girl at her family's church by getting involved with children. When she was in high school, she toured with a children's musical theatre troupe throughout the city of Chicago.

Her first professional job was in summer stock in Lincoln City, Indiana, where she performed in Young Abe: the Abraham Lincoln Boyhood Outdoor Musical Drama. Her theatre roles included productions of Annie, Cinderella and Big River. Her father is Carroll Moore and her mother is Joy Moore. She has one younger sister.

== Career ==
After graduating from Illinois Wesleyan University School of Theatre Arts, Moore moved to Los Angeles to pursue her acting career. Her television credits include the UPN comedy The Bad Girl's Guide and the drama Hyperion Bay, recurring roles on Pasadena and Unhappily Ever After, and guest appearances on 24, Just Shoot Me!, Friends, and Suddenly Susan.

=== MADtv ===
Moore joined the cast of MADtv in 2002 as a featured performer for the eighth season, where she was noted for her impressions of Christina Aguilera, Shannon Elizabeth, Sharon Stone, Trista Rehn and Brittany Murphy. With Josh Meyers, she is one of two former MadTV members to join the cast of That '70s Show.

=== Other entertainment projects ===
Moore appeared in Married... with Children as the Gorgeous Woman in the episode "Twisted" (1996). She left the MADtv at the conclusion of the eighth season to join the cast of That '70s Show. She replaced Lisa Robin Kelly as Laurie Forman during the show's sixth season. In 2005, she starred in the TV series Hot Properties , which had aired 13 episodes. She also starred in Without a Paddle and Dave Barry's Complete Guide to Guys. She also appeared in Two and a Half Men as Cynthia Sullivan in the episode "The Soil is Moist" (2008). She played Alan Harper's rebound lover on Two and a Half Men. In 2008, she began a recurring role on The CW's 90210 as Tracy Clark, the sexy and mischievous mother of Naomi Clark. She also narrates various audio books, including Diane Duane's Young Wizards series and Yellow Star. She was part of the main cast of Hawthorne playing Candy Sullivan.

Moore is a founding member of Bitches Funny, an all-female sketch group that has performed in New York City and Los Angeles for the past five years. She also had a recurring role in the Disney Channel shows Jessie and Bunk'd as Christina, the mother of the Ross children, in Sonny with a Chance as Tammi, Tawni's mother, as well as Vanessa Baxter's empty-headed sister April on the former ABC sitcom Last Man Standing.

== Personal life ==
Moore has been married to actor John Ducey since 2008.

== Filmography ==
Film roles
Year	Title	Role	Notes
1997	The Sore Losers	J-Wags patron	
1998	Second Skin	N/A	
2004	Without a Paddle	Butterfly	
2005	Complete Guide to Guys	Elaine	
2007	Delta Farce	Karen	
2011	Born to Race	Ms. Parker	Direct-to-video
2012	Searching for Fortune	Emily	
2012	Sperm Donor	Sperm Donor	
2012	Serial Dater	N/A	Short film
2018	Dirt	Glenda Raddon	Producer
2018	Stuck	Mrs. Montgomery	
2018	The Ride	Maggie McCord	
2020	Lady Driver	Jessie Lansing Dickson	
2020	Roped	Patty Peterson	
2020	Wheels of Fortune	Chrissy Davis	Producer
2022	I Believe in Santa	Lisa	
2023	The Nana Project	Cindy Trublen	
2024	The Curse of the Necklace	Ruth Petersen	
2026	Casa Grande	Susanna Clarkman	Producer
TBA	Double Trouble	—N/a	Post-production; producer

Television roles
Year	Title	Role	Notes
1996	Beverly Hills, 90210	Sexy Anchor	Episode: "Disappearing Act"
1996	Married... with Children	Gorgeous Woman	Episode: "Twisted"
1997	The Burning Zone	Tracy	Episode: "The Last Endless Summer"
1997	Wings	Terri	Episode: "Escape from New York"
1997	Silk Stalkings	Susan Henderson	Episode: "The Rock"
1997	Fired Up	Betsy	Episode: "Ten Grand a Dance"
1997	Almost Perfect	Jenny	Episode: "K.I.S.S."
1998	Unhappily Ever After	Cherri	4 episodes (1 uncredited)
1998	The Drew Carey Show	Court Reporter	Episode: "The Sex Drug"
1998, 2000	Suddenly Susan	Heather / Elizabeth Macstone	Episodes: "Pucker Up", "Dinner Party"
1998	Friends	Marjorie	Episode: "The One with All the Wedding Dresses"
1998	Conrad Bloom	Allison	Episode: "Pilot"
1998–1999	Hyperion Bay	Amy Sweeny	Main role
2000	Just Shoot Me!	Colleen	Episode: "The First Thanksgiving"
2001	Seven Days	Dr. Grace Weiman	Episode: "Head Case"
2001	Family Law	Jennifer Cooke	2 episodes
2001	Walking Shadow	Jocelyn Colby	Television film
2001–2002	Pasadena	Jayleen Richards	4 episodes
2002	24	Dana	Episode: "9:00 p.m. – 10:00 p.m."
2002–2003	MADtv	Various	25 episodes
2003–2004	That '70s Show	Laurie Forman	Recurring role; 6 episodes
2005	Unscripted	Support group testimonial	Episode #1.8
2005	The Bad Girl's Guide	Sarah	Main role
2005	Hot Properties	Emerson Ives	Main role
2006	Love, Inc.	Tiffany	Episode: "Anything But Love"
2006	Will & Grace	Kitty	Episode: "Partners 'n' Crime"
2007	The Wedding Bells	Chrissie Miller	Episode: "The Most Beautiful Girl"
2007	Women's Murder Club	Drew Kaplan	Episode: "Play Through the Pain"
2008	Unhitched	Barbara	Episode: "Woman Marries Horse"
2008	Two and a Half Men	Cynthia Sullivan	Episode: "The Soil is Moist"
2008–2009, 2013	90210	Tracy Clark	Recurring role; 10 episodes
2009–2011	Hawthorne	Candy Sullivan	Main role (seasons 1–2); special guest (season 3); 20 episodes
2009	Sonny with a Chance	Tammi Hart	Episode: "Hart to Hart"
2010	Burn Notice	Isabella Corvino	Episode: "Partners in Crime"
2011–2012	True Blood	Suzanne McKittrick	4 episodes
2011–2015	Jessie	Christina Ross	Recurring role; 7 episodes
2011	Free Agents	Hank's date	Episode: "Rebranding"
2012	Man Up!	Marcy	Episode: "Be Who You're Not"
2012	Rules of Engagement	Jane	Episode: "Missed Connections"
2012–2014	Last Man Standing	Aunt April	Episodes: "Found Money", "April, Come She Will"
2012	Castle	Stephanie Frye	Episode: "The Final Frontier"
2014	Suburgatory	Karen	Episode: "Dalia Nicole Smith"
2014	Jennifer Falls	Carrie	Episode: "Health Club"
2014–2015	Bad Judge	Tom's Wife	2 episodes
2015	Dropping the Soap	Rachel	Episode: "Alien Abductions"
2016	Mom	Camille	Episode: "Freckled Bananas and a Little Schwinn"
2017	Bunk'd	Christina Ross	1 episode
2016–2017	Mr. Student Body President	Principal Renee Helfrick	12 episodes
2017–2019	Claws	Mandy Heiser	8 episodes
2017	Drive Share	Hannah's Mom	Episode: " Marry Me?"
2017	Marlon	Miss Frye	Episode: "Career Day"
2019	The Unicorn	Lizzie	Episode: 'Breaking Up Is Hard to Do"

=== Screenwriting ===
- Pray for Rain (2017)
- Running Wild (2017)
