= List of Barney characters =

Barney is a children's educational media franchise that originated with the 1988 direct-to-video series Barney & the Backyard Gang by Sheryl Stamps-Leach and Kathy O'Rourke-Parker. Barney consists of three series—Barney & the Backyard Gang (1988–1991), which consists of only eight videos, Barney & Friends (1992–2010), a television series that ran on PBS Kids, and Barney's World (2024–2025), a fully animated series set to air on Cartoon Network's Cartoonito, and which is currently streaming on Max and is currently distributed by 9 Story Media Group, under license from Mattel Television.

The Barney franchise follows the titular character Barney, an anthropomorphic purple Tyrannosaurus rex who conveys educational messages through songs and small dance routines with a friendly, huggable and optimistic attitude.

== Overview ==
Characters	Main television series															Animated television series	Film
Characters	Barney & the Backyard Gang	Barney & Friends														Barney's World	Barney's Great Adventure
Characters	Barney & the Backyard Gang	Season														Barney's World	Barney's Great Adventure
Characters	Barney & the Backyard Gang	1	2	3	4	5	6	7	8	9	10	11	12	13	14	Barney's World	Barney's Great Adventure
Barney (costume)	David Voss (Videos 1–6) David Joyner (Videos 7, 8)	David Joyner	David Joyner	David Joyner	David Joyner Josh Martin (Episodes 14–16, 18–20) Maurice Scott (Episode 17)	David Joyner	David Joyner	Carey Stinson Maurice Scott (Episode 4 (one scene))	Carey Stinson	Carey Stinson Maurice Scott (Episodes 3–4 (white screen scenes))	Carey Stinson	Carey Stinson	Carey Stinson	Carey Stinson	Carey Stinson		David Joyner
Barney (voice)	Bob West	Bob West	Bob West	Bob West	Bob West	Bob West	Bob West	Dean Wendt	Dean Wendt	Dean Wendt	Dean Wendt	Dean Wendt	Dean Wendt	Dean Wendt	Dean Wendt	Jonathan Langdon	Bob West
Baby Bop (costume)	Dao Knight	Jenny Dempsey	Jeff Ayers	Jeff Ayers	Jeff Ayers	Jeff Ayers	Jeff Ayers Jennifer Romano (Episode 1) Jeff Brooks (Episode 9)	Jeff Ayers Jennifer Romano (Episode 20)	Jeff Ayers	Jeff Ayers	Jeff Ayers	Jeff Ayers	Jennifer Barlean Jeff Ayers (Episode 2)	Lauren Mayeux	Lauren Mayeux (New material) Jeff Ayers		Jeff Ayers
Baby Bop (voice)	Julie Johnson	Julie Johnson	Julie Johnson	Julie Johnson	Julie Johnson	Julie Johnson	Julie Johnson	Julie Johnson	Julie Johnson	Julie Johnson	Julie Johnson	Julie Johnson	Julie Johnson	Julie Johnson	Julie Johnson	Bryn McAuley	Julie Johnson
BJ (costume)			Jenny Dempsey	Jeff Brooks	Jeff Brooks Adam Brown (Episode 20 (some scenes))	Jeff Brooks	Jeff Brooks	Kyle Nelson	Kyle Nelson	Kyle Nelson	Kyle Nelson	Kyle Nelson	Kyle Nelson	Kyle Nelson	Kyle Nelson		Jeff Brooks
BJ / Billy (voice)			Patty Wirtz	Patty Wirtz	Patty Wirtz	Patty Wirtz	Patty Wirtz	Patty Wirtz	Patty Wirtz	Patty Wirtz	Patty Wirtz	Patty Wirtz	Patty Wirtz	Patty Wirtz	Patty Wirtz	Jonathan Tan	Patty Wirtz
Riff (costume)											Adam Brown	Adam Brown	Jerad Harris Jeff Ayers (Episodes 6, 7, 10)	Jerad Harris	Jerad Harris (New material) Adam Brown		
Riff (voice)											Michaela Dietz	Michaela Dietz	Michaela Dietz	Michaela Dietz	Michaela Dietz		
Booker T. Bookworm / Bartholomew Bookworm						Earl Fisher (puppet and voice)										Anthony Sardinha (voice)	
Tina	Jessica Zucha	Jessica Zucha	Jessica Zucha	Jessica Zucha													
Luci	Leah Gloria	Leah Gloria	Leah Gloria														
Amy	Becky Swonke																
Jason	Salim Grant																
Michael	Brian Eppes	Brian Eppes	Brian Eppes														
Kim					Danielle Vega	Danielle Vega	Danielle Vega										
Angela								Demi Lovato	Demi Lovato								
Gianna								Selena Gomez	Selena Gomez								
Jamal								Peyton Alex Smith			Peyton Alex Smith						
Debby											Debby Ryan						
Bridget											Madison Pettis						
Joshua													Jaren Lewison	Jaren Lewison			
Jill													Mikayla Abdalla				

== Main ==
=== Dinosaurs ===
==== Barney ====
Barney
- Barney character
- First appearance: "The Backyard Show"; Barney & the Backyard Gang; 1988
- Portrayed by: David Voss (1990–1998); David Joyner (1991–2001); Josh Martin (1997); Maurice Scott (1997–2004); Carey Stinson (2002–2010)
- Voiced by: Bob West (1988–2000); Dean Wendt (2002–2010); Jonathan Langdon (2024–2025); Korey Durham (2024–present)

In-universe information
- Species: Tyrannosaurus rex
- Gender: Male

Barney is the main character of the Barney franchise. He is an anthropomoprhic purple Tyrannosaurus rex with a green stomach in stuffed animal likeness, who comes to life through the children's imaginations. His theme song is "Barney is a Dinosaur", whose tune is based on "Yankee Doodle". Barney often quotes things as being "Super dee-duper". Episodes frequently end with the song "I Love You", sung to the tune of "This Old Man". Despite being a carnivorous type dinosaur, Barney does not have a carnivore's fearsome teeth. He likes many different foods such as fruits and vegetables, but his main favorite is a peanut butter and jelly sandwich with a glass of milk.

==== Baby Bop ====
Baby Bop
- Barney character
- First appearance: "Barney in Concert"; Barney & the Backyard Gang; 1991
- Created by: Sheryl Stamps-Leach; Kathy O'Rourke-Parker
- Portrayed by: Dao Knight (1991); Jenny Dempsey (1992); Jeff Ayers (1993–2008; 2010); Jennifer Romano (1999; 2002); Jeff Brooks (1999); Lauren Mayeux (2009–2010)
- Voiced by: Julie Johnson (1991–2010); Bryn McAuley (2024–2025)

In-universe information
- Nickname: Sissy
- Species: Triceratops
- Gender: Female

Baby Bop is an anthropomorphic green Triceratops wearing a pink bow and pink ballet slippers and always carrying a yellow security blanket along with her, which is referred to as her "blankey". First appearing in the Barney & the Backyard Gang video Barney in Concert, she was originally two years old; however, in the Barney & Friends episode "Look at Me, I'm 3!", she turned three years old. She sings the song "My Yellow Blankey" to show how much her security blanket means to her. She likes to eat macaroni and cheese and pizza. She is the younger sister of BJ.

==== BJ (Billy) ====
BJ
- Barney character
- First appearance: "Look at Me, I'm 3!"; Barney & Friends; 1993
- Portrayed by: Jenny Dempsey (1993); Jeff Brooks (1995–2000); Adam Brown (2000); Kyle Nelson (2002–2010)
- Voiced by: Patty Wirtz (1993–2010); Jonathan Tan (2024–2025)

In-universe information
- Alias: Billy
- Species: Protoceratops
- Gender: Male

BJ is a 7-year-old anthropomorphic yellow Protoceratops who wears a red baseball cap and red sneakers. First appearing in the Barney & Friends episode "Look at Me, I'm 3!", he is the older brother of Baby Bop, whom he frequently calls "sissy" and occasionally calls by her name. He sings "BJ's Song", a song about himself. He lost his hat in the Barney & Friends episode "Hats Off to BJ!" Pickles are his favorite food, and he has tried them in various ways, such as on pizza. For Barney's World, for unknown reasons, the character was renamed to "Billy."

==== Riff ====
Riff
- Barney character
- First appearance: "Welcome, Cousin Riff"; Barney & Friends; 2006
- Last appearance: A-Counting We Will Go; 2010
- Portrayed by: Adam Brown (2006–2007; 2010); Jerad Harris (2008–2010); Jeff Ayers (2008)
- Voiced by: Michaela Dietz

In-universe information
- Species: Hadrosaur
- Gender: Male

Riff is a character who has only appeared in Barney & Friends from seasons 10 through 14 and in some Barney home videos. First appearing in "Welcome, Cousin Riff", he is a 6-year-old anthropomorphic orange Hadrosaur who wears green sneakers, and he is Baby Bop and BJ's cousin. His theme music is "I Hear Music Everywhere". Riff loves music and it is in almost everything he does. In the video Barney: Let's Go to the Firehouse, it was revealed that Riff also likes to invent different kinds of things; he created a four-sound smoke detector (the first three were different alarm sounds and the final one his voice). He is shown to have an interest in marching bands and parades. His most recent appearance is in A-Counting We Will Go, a Barney home video.

=== Children ===
==== Tina ====
Tina
- Barney character
- First appearance: "The Backyard Show"; Barney & the Backyard Gang; 1988
- Last appearance: "On the Move" (1995)
- Portrayed by: Jessica Zucha

In-universe information
- Gender: Female
- Family: Tina and Luci's Mom (mother); Luci (sister)

Tina is a character from the Barney franchise. First appearing in the Barney & the Backyard Gang video The Backyard Show, she also appeared in Barney & Friends, with her first appearance being "The Queen of Make-Believe". Tina lives with her big sister Luci, her mother, her cat Whiskers, and her frog Bouncer. She loves animals, bugs, sing songs in the car, square dance to country music, and climb trees. Her favorite food is macaroni and cheese.

==== Luci ====
Luci
- Barney character
- First appearance: "The Backyard Show"; Barney & the Backyard Gang; 1988
- Last appearance: "The Exercise Circus!" (1993)
- Portrayed by: Leah Gloria

In-universe information
- Gender: Female
- Family: Tina and Luci's Mom (mother); Tina (sister)

Luci is a character from the Barney franchise. First appearing in the Barney & the Backyard Gang video The Backyard Show, she also appeared in Barney & Friends, with her first appearance being "My Family's Just Right For Me". Luci lives with her little sister Tina, and her cat Whiskers. She loves winter, playing the guitar, cartwheels and tap dancing. Her favorite food is salad.

==== Adam ====
Adam
- Barney & the Backyard Gang character
- First appearance: "The Backyard Show"; Barney & the Backyard Gang; 1988
- Last appearance: "Rock with Barney"; Barney & the Backyard Gang; 1991
- Portrayed by: Alexander Jhin

In-universe information
- Gender: Male
- Family: Adam's Dad

Adam is a character who appeared in seven of the eight videos of Barney & the Backyard Gang. In Campfire Sing-Along, he was replaced with Jeffrey because Alexander Jhin wasn't available at the time that video was filmed. Like Amy, Adam did not appear in Barney & Friends because Alexander Jhin was also unavailable in that series along with Becky Swonke.

==== Amy ====
Amy
- Barney & the Backyard Gang character
- First appearance: "The Backyard Show"; Barney & the Backyard Gang; 1988
- Last appearance: "Rock with Barney"; Barney & the Backyard Gang; 1991
- Portrayed by: Becky Swonke

In-universe information
- Gender: Female
- Family: Amy's Mom; Michael's Dad; Michael (brother)

Amy is a character who appeared in all eight videos of Barney & the Backyard Gang.

==== Jason ====
Jason
- Barney & the Backyard Gang character
- First appearance: "The Backyard Show"; Barney & the Backyard Gang; 1988
- Last appearance: "A Day at the Beach"; Barney & the Backyard Gang; 1989
- Portrayed by: Salim Grant

In-universe information
- Gender: Male

Jason is a character who only appeared in the first three videos of Barney & the Backyard Gang. He is able to tap dance and likes animals. However, he can also make waves with his arms, which he likes to do as well.

==== Michael ====
Michael
- Barney character
- First appearance: "The Backyard Show"; Barney & the Backyard Gang; 1988
- Last appearance: Sing & Dance with Barney (1999)
- Portrayed by: Brian Eppes

In-universe information
- Gender: Male
- Family: Amy's Mom; Michael's Dad; Amy (sister)

Michael is a character from the Barney franchise. First appearing in the Barney & the Backyard Gang video The Backyard Show, he also appeared in Barney & Friends, with his first appearance being "The Queen of Make-Believe". Michael lives with his little sister named Amy, his parents, and their dogs, Buster and Sparky. He likes to search for rocks when camping, meaning that he has a rock collection at home in a box. Michael is also a school crossing guard. In addition to his favorite food being cold watermelons, Michael is able to play the cello because he likes music; he is also known for playing soccer, however.

==== Kim ====
Kim
- Barney character
- First appearance: Barney's Sense-Sational Day (1997)
- Last appearance: Barney's Beach Party (2002)
- Portrayed by: Erica Rhodes

In-universe information
- Gender: Female

Kim is a character who appeared in various Barney episodes like with Barney & Friends episodes from Seasons 4 through 6. She lives with her parents, an older sister, and an adopted baby brother, and she has a friend named Kristen. Kim prefers to dance and sing. However, she also knows how to play the flute. Her favorite bear is the giant panda. In "A Picture of Health" it was revealed that Kim once accidentally damaged her foot and needed to head to the hospital for an X-ray.

== Recurring ==
=== Mother Goose ===
Mother Goose
- Barney character
- First appearance: "Let's Help Mother Goose!"; Barney & Friends; 1992
- Last appearance: "Mother Goose"; Barney & Friends; 2010
- Portrayed by: Sandy Walper (1992–1993); Michelle McCarel (1998); Barbara Lowin (2000); Julie Johnson (2006–2010)

In-universe information
- Gender: Female

Mother Goose is a character from Barney & Friends. Based on the fictional storyteller of the same name, she is an imaginary author who lives in the "Land of Mother Goose" (a land featuring her house, her garden, other characters from nursery rhymes, etc.) and prefers to speak in "rhyme". Mother Goose has been around for a large number of years for a quite long time and has a pet goose named Clarence (who appeared in "Honk! Honk! A Goose on the Loose!" and Barney's Big Surprise). Frequently, she already knows Barney's friends, as she knows the name of everyone who has ever read her rhymes.
