= Barney's Big Surprise =

- Directed by: Clark Santee
- Written by: Stephen White
- Produced by: Solan Coleman
- Starring: Bob West; Julie Johnson; Patty Wirtz
- Music by: Joe Phillips
- Production company: Lyons Partnership, L.P.
- Distributed by: Lyrick Studios
- Release date: May 19, 1998
- Running time: 78 minutes
- Language: English

Barney's Big Surprise (also known as La Gran Sorpresa de Barney in Latin America) was Barney the Dinosaur's first national tour. The show started in 1996 and played in 60 cities, with a program of 28 old and new Barney songs. Originally planned for theaters (and modeled after the earlier Barney Live in New York City at Radio City Music Hall in New York City), it was revised to become more like a rock concert for young children; most of the venues were small arenas with around 5,000 seats, with some larger arenas used as well. A video of the show, which had been taped at the Lawrence Joel Veterans Memorial Coliseum, was released in 1998.

== Cast ==
The cast list below is taken from the video release and does not show all cast members that have performed in this show.

- Barney (suit) – Carey Stinson/Josh Martin
- Barney (voice) – Bob West
- Baby Bop (suit) – Lee Clark/Jennifer Romano
- Baby Bop (voice) – Julie Johnson
- B.J. (suit) – Kyle Nelson/Pat O'Connoll
- B.J. (voice) – Patty Wirtz

=== Additional cast ===
- Professor Tinkerputt – Barry Pearl
- Mother Goose – Michelle McCarel
- Old King Cole – Dewayne Hambrick
- Kevin – Brent Love
- Cindy – Mallory Lineberger
- Rachel – Vanessa Lauren
- Tony – Trent Gentry

== Songs ==
=== Act 1 songs ===
1. Barney Is A Dinosaur
2. If You're Happy And You Know It
3. Welcome To Our Treehouse
4. The Baby Bop Hop
5. Happy Birthday To Me
6. The Airplane Song
7. My Kite
8. Car Sing-Along Medley (In The Car And Having Fun, Itsy Bitsy Spider, and Mister Sun)
9. Mr. Knickerbocker
10. Tinkerputt's Song
11. We Are Little Robots
12. The Rainbow Song

=== Act 2 songs ===
1. Hey Look At Me! I Can Fly!
2. Ducks That I Once Knew
3. Happy Birthday To Me (reprise)
4. If All The Raindrops
5. Old McDonald Had a Farm
6. I'm Mother Goose
7. Nursery-Rhyme Medley (Humpty Dumpty, Hey Diddle Diddle, Little Miss Muffet, Little Boy Blue, 1, 2, Buckle My Shoe, Sing A Song Of Sixpence)
8. Old King Cole
9. Happy Birthday To You
10. I Love You

== Production ==
After the release of Barney Live in New York City, Sloan Coleman went to Richard C. Leach, who helped launch Barney, to suggest making Barney live events bigger. Coleman requested one million dollars and the best Rock ‘n’ roll tour manager he can find, which became the basis for Barney's Big Surprise. At first, it was envisioned as a show that would play in theaters, much like the performance at Radio City Music Hall in 1994, however, the show was too big to play in theaters.

After doing the music for the attraction A Day in the Park with Barney, Joseph Phillips was approached by Coleman to do the music for the tour of Barney's Big Surprise. Phillips (and his crew) mixed and edited the show while it was being rehearsed at the same time.

David Voss, who was the original Barney costume actor, served as the Dance Captain and Cast Manager for the tour. Following the original run in the US, Pablo Glattli and Esteban Grossy choreographed and directed the show for the South American run while Kym Halpin directed the Asian run of the tour. Penny Wilson, the original director and choreographer of the tour, directed for the Mexican run in 2006, alongside David Voss.

=== Casting ===
Coleman auditioned 100 professional child actors from the Dallas area between the ages of ten to twelve who look seven to eight years old to be in the children's cast. Initially, Danielle Vega was asked to be a part of Barney's Big Surprise but was eventually swapped to be a series regular on Barney & Friends portraying Kim.

When the tour performed in Mexico in 1998, Courtney Cook Chavera returned to reprise her role of Cindy since Mallory Lineberger wasn't able to extend to the Mexican tour for unknown reason. The performances in Mexico were also dubbed in Spanish, meaning that the voices of Barney, Baby Bop, and BJ were done by José Carlos Moreno, Elsa Covián and Love Santini, respectively. The voice of Professor Tinkerputt was done by Blas García as well, while Barry Pearl would still be on stage. Prior to the Mexican performances, the Spanish version of the show would premiere on February 19, 1998, in Miami, Florida.

== Release ==
The show made its world premiere on September 10, 1996, at Will Rogers Memorial Center in Fort Worth, Texas. It ran until 1998. Originally meant to tour in sixty cities, the tour performed in over eighty cities during its original run. Barney's BIG Surprise! sold nearly two million tickets during the original run. Along with performances in the US and Canada, the show also toured in Mexico and the United Kingdom in its initial run in 1998. Subsequent productions of the show were performed in Asia from 2004 to 2005 and Latin America from 2005 to 2007. A portion of the proceeds from the tour benefited the Starbright Foundation, which aids seriously ill children.

=== Broadcast television ===
The video aired on PBS in March 1999, being the fifth of only eleven Barney Home Video's to be televised on that network. In the television version of the video, the songs "Mr. Knickerbocker", "Hey, Look at Me! I Can Fly!", "Six Little Ducks", "Old MacDonald Had a Farm", "Little Miss Muffet", "Little Boy Blue", and "One, Two, Buckle My Shoe" were omitted.

=== Home media ===
Originally, this video was supposed to be released on VHS in June 1998, but the release was moved up to May 19, 1998. It was filmed at the Lawrence Joel Veterans Memorial Coliseum in Winston-Salem, North Carolina from December 13–14, 1997. It was the third Barney live show to be released on home video following Barney in Concert and Barney Live in New York City. It was later re-released on VHS in 2000.

== Reception ==
Los Angeles Times critic Lynne Heffley noted that the "feel-good formula" for the stage show was similar to a Barney television episode: "hugging, singing, dancing, more hugging and a little advice", and she found the result to be "lively, expertly staged and a lavish visual treat", although she suggested earplugs given the loud volumes. In the Chicago Tribune, Eric Fidler commented that "Judging Barney through the eyes of an adult is pointless. For an adult unable to relax and suspend judgment, the show was a vision of some twisted hell. But kids were in heaven."

=== Accolades ===
Year	Award	Category	Result	References
1998	Performance Magazine's 1997 "Reader's Poll Award"	Best Family/Variety Touring Act of the Year	Won	
