= Barney the Dinosaur =

- Barney character
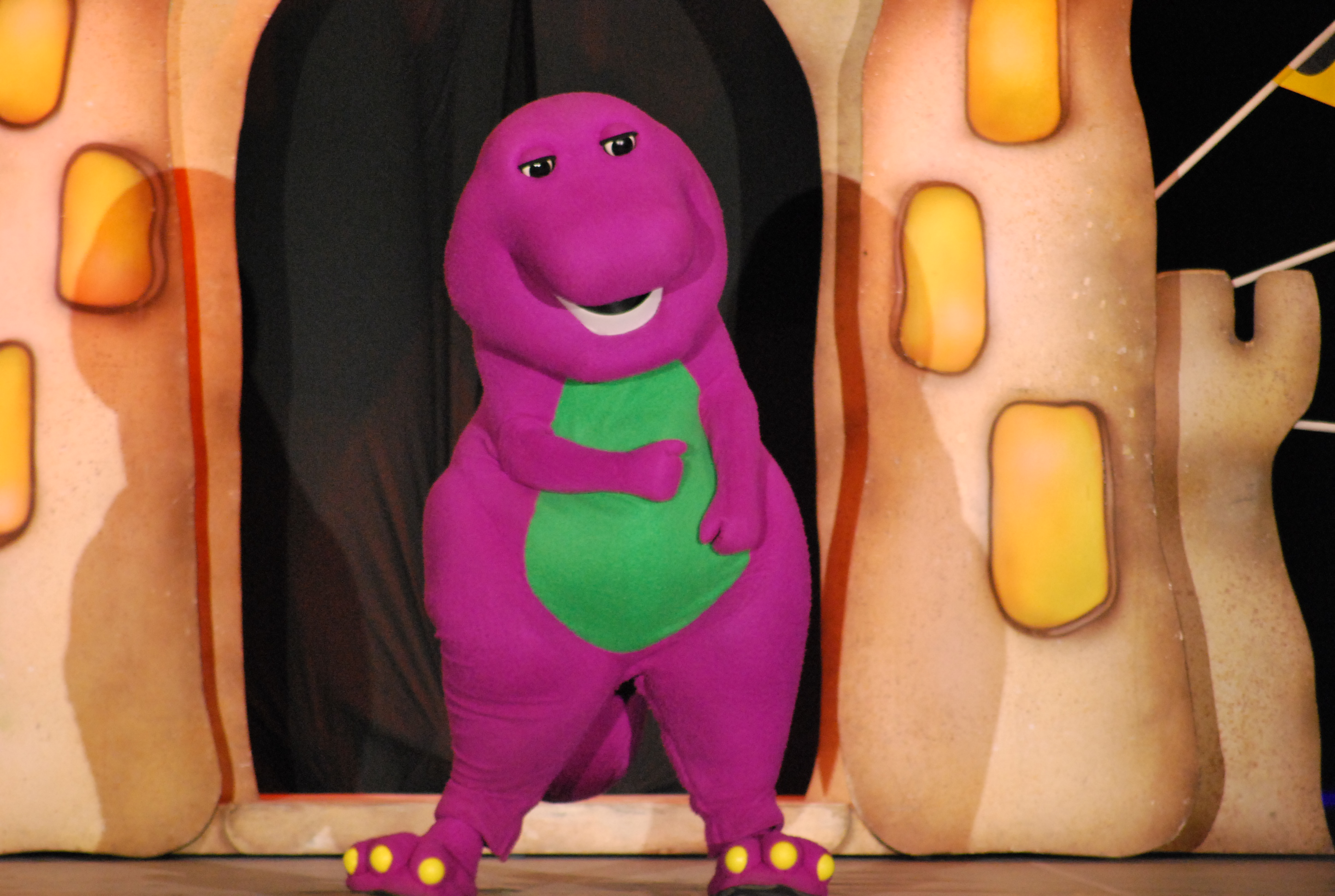
- Barney the Dinosaur at a live show in Qatar.
- First appearance: "The Backyard Show"; Barney & the Backyard Gang
- Created by: Sheryl Leach
- Portrayed by: David Voss (1988–1990); David Joyner (1991–2001); Josh Martin (1997); Maurice Scott (1997–2004); Carey Stinson (2002–2010)
- Voiced by: Bob West (1988–2000); Duncan Brannan (1997–2002); Dean Wendt (2002–2010); Jonathan Langdon (2024–2025); Korey Durham (2024–present)

In-universe information
- Species: Tyrannosaurus rex
- Gender: Male
- Color: Purple and green

Barney the Dinosaur is a fictional anthropomorphic purple Tyrannosaurus rex who is the titular character of the Barney franchise. Barney is known for conveying educational messages to children through songs and dance routines, and is characterized as friendly and huggable, with an optimistic attitude. The character was created by Sheryl Leach and debuted in 1988 on Barney & the Backyard Gang, a direct-to-video series. Barney next appeared on the network show Barney & Friends, which ran from 1992 until 2010. He has since appeared in various other media, including films and video games.

== Description ==
Barney the Dinosaur is the main character of the Barney franchise. He is an anthropomorphic purple Tyrannosaurus rex with a green stomach in stuffed animal likeness, who comes to life through the children's imaginations. His theme song is "Barney is a Dinosaur", whose tune is based on "Yankee Doodle". Barney often quotes things as being "Super dee-duper". Episodes frequently end with the song "I Love You", sung to the tune of "This Old Man". Despite being a carnivorous type dinosaur, Barney does not have a carnivore's fearsome teeth. He likes many different foods such as fruits and vegetables, but his main favorite is a peanut butter and jelly sandwich with a glass of milk.

== Media ==
=== Barney & the Backyard Gang ===
Barney & the Backyard Gang was an American direct-to-video series produced by The Lyons Group which was released in installments between August 29, 1988, and August 1, 1991.

=== Barney & Friends ===
Barney & Friends is an American children's television series targeted at preschool children created by Sheryl Leach. The series first aired on PBS on April 6, 1992, and features Barney, a purple anthropomorphic Tyrannosaurus rex who conveys educational messages through songs and small dance routines with a friendly, huggable and optimistic attitude. The series ended on November 2, 2010, although new videos were still released on various dates after the last episode aired. Reruns aired on Sprout from 2005 to 2015, and from December 17, 2018, onward on Sprout's successor network, Universal Kids.

=== Barney's World ===
Barney's World is an animated television series that debuted on HBO Max on October 14, 2024. Produced by Mattel Television and Corus Entertainment's Nelvana, the show served as a relaunch of the Barney franchise for the 2020s.

=== Films ===
- Bedtime with Barney: Imagination Island (1994) (television special)
- Barney's Great Adventure (1998) (theatrical movie starring Trevor Morgan and Kyla Pratt)
- Barney: Let's Go to the Zoo (2001)
- Untitled Barney movie (TBA) (theatrical movie produced by Daniel Kaluuya)

=== Stage specials ===
- Barney in Concert (1991) (taped stage show)
- Barney Live in New York City (1994) (taped stage show)
- Barney's Big Surprise (1998) (taped stage show)
- Barney's Musical Castle (2001) (taped stage show)
- Barney's Colorful World (2004) (taped stage show)

=== Other appearances ===
- Barney's Hide & Seek Game, Sega Genesis/Mega Drive video game
- A Day in the Park with Barney, a theme park stage show, and playground, that ran at Universal Studios Florida from 1995 until permanently closing in 2021.

== Criticism ==
Anti-Barney humor came to be during the height of Barney's popularity. This anti-Barney sentiment was studied in the documentary series I Love You, You Hate Me by Tommy Avallone.
