= I Love You, You Hate Me =

2022 American television documentary series

- Genre: Documentary
- Directed by: Tommy Avallone
- Music by: Ah2
- Country of origin: United States
- Original language: English
- No. of episodes: 2

Production
- Executive producers: Rob Eric; Joel Chiodi; David Collins; Michael Williams; Tommy Avallone; Raymond Esposito; Wendy Greene; Amy Goodman Kass
- Producer: Trent Johnson
- Editors: Barry Blaschke; Addison Mccoubrey; Aaron Pomerantz; Kieran Healy; Jason Szabo
- Running time: 53-58 minutes
- Production company: Scout Productions

Original release
- Network: Peacock
- Release: October 12, 2022

I Love You, You Hate Me is a 2022 limited documentary television series directed by Tommy Avallone and produced by Trent Johnson. The documentary special chronicles the rise and fall of, and the backlash against Barney the Dinosaur.

The special features interviews with various cast and crew of Barney & Friends, and the preceding, Barney & the Backyard Gang, offering first-hand accounts of the Barney phenomenon. Fans and outspoken critics of the franchise are also featured in the documentary special as well.

The limited series premiered on the streaming service Peacock on October 12, 2022. It received positive reviews from critics.

== Premise ==
The series follows the rise and fall of Barney's furious backlash — and what it says about the human need to hate. From Barney-bashing to frat parties to homicidal video games, something in American society broke into a million pieces, and it's never been put together again... or is this just who we were all along?

== Cast ==
=== Dinosaurs ===
- Bob West - original voice of Barney
- David Joyner - a costume performer of Barney
- David Voss - original costume performer of Barney
- Dean Wendt - a voice actor of Barney
- Carey Stinson - a costume performer of Barney
- Michaela Dietz - original voice of Riff
- Lauren Mayeux - a costume performer of Baby Bop

=== Child actors ===
- Leah Montes - Luci
- Rickey Carter - Derek
- Pia Hamilton - Min
- Hope Cervantes - Tosha

=== Crew ===
- Sloan Coleman - SVP, Live Events
- Stephen White - writer
- Bob Singleton - music director
- Lori Wendt - educational researcher and consultant
- Steve Gomer - director of Barney's Great Adventure
- Pat Reeder - writer for Barney & the Backyard Gang
- Shelley C. Aubrey - dialogue coach, performance director
- Larry Rifkin - Head of programming, Connecticut Public Television

=== Other ===
- Leora Rifkin - daughter of Larry Rifkin

=== Fans ===
- Andrew Olsen - founder of the Barney History Fans website
- Jackson Gates - former admin of Barney History Fans

=== Critics ===
- Sean Breen - member and leader of "The Jihad to Destroy Barney"
- Robert Curran - founder of the "I Hate Barney Secret Society"
- Travis Fox – University of Nebraska–Lincoln
- The Famous/San Diego Chicken (Ted Giannoulas) - mascot

=== Law ===
- Brenda Lee – Los Angeles County Prosecutor
- Steve Whitmore – Los Angeles County Sheriff's Department
- Ken Fitzgerald – attorney
- Charles Mittelstadt – Criminal Defense Investigator

=== Others ===
- Kim Goad - Dallas News Journalist
- Dr. Yalda T. Uhls – Developmental Psychologist
- Brittany Spanos – Senior Writer, Rolling Stone
- Calvin Edwards – Pop Culture Expert
- Stefania Marghitu, Phd – Asst. Prof. Media Cultural Studies, Loyola
- David Dushman – Curator, Paley Center for Media
- Shannon Foley Martinez – Anti-Hate Activist

=== Television ===
- Steve Burns - original host of Blue's Clues
- Bill Nye - host of Bill Nye the Science Guy
- Al Roker - NBC anchor
- Burt Dubrow - television producer, The Jerry Springer Show
- Patrice Pascual - PR, Connecticut Public Television

=== Archival ===
- Sheryl Leach - creator of Barney
- Patrick Leach - son of Sheryl Leach
- Richard C. Leach - chairman of DLM (Developmental Learning Materials) and Lyrick Studios; father-in-law of Sheryl Leach
- Jim Leach - ex-husband of Sheryl Leach
- Erick Shanks - neighbor of Patrick Leach

== Production ==
The documentary originated after director Tommy Avallone viewed a nostalgic social media post featuring a 1993 news story about a Barney-bashing event at the University of Nebraska–Lincoln, and wondered if he could tell a story about love and hate through the story of Barney the Dinosaur. Avallone began work on the documentary in 2020. The documentary, then untitled, was officially announced on November 15, 2021 as a three-part series. The documentary was announced to look into the popularity of Barney who also became a target of hate worldwide. During production, a few cast and crew members from Barney & Friends, and the preceding, Barney & the Backyard Gang, were interviewed, offering first-hand accounts of the Barney phenomenon. Fans of the franchise and outspoken critics were announced to be interviewed as well.

On December 1, 2021, Matt McDonald, the archival producer for the documentary, reached out to a few users via Barney Wiki for help on the documentary.

=== Interviewees ===
While many people wanted to discuss Barney, nearly fifty interviews of people from the later years of Barney & Friends and the touring stage shows were unable to make the final cut of the documentary. Notable interviewees from the Barney franchise cut from the documentary include Jeff Ayers (a body of Baby Bop), Kyle Nelson (a body of BJ), Jess Nelson (a production designer) and Josh Martin (a body of Barney). Julie Johnson and Patty Wirtz, the original voices of Baby Bop and BJ respectively, were meant to be interviewed, but Johnson was on tour and Wirtz had COVID-19 when the crew was filming in Texas. Kenny Cooper (who portrayed David in season two of Barney & Friends) was also meant to be interviewed, but he had COVID-19 as well.

During production of the documentary, Tommy Avallone, director the documentary, met up with Sheryl Leach, creator of the Barney franchise, in Sleepy Hollow, New York to inquire about participating in the documentary. After thinking about it, Leach declined. Her son, Patrick Leach, declined interview requests. Former child-actors of the show, Demi Lovato and Selena Gomez were inquired to be in the documentary, but declined interview requests with the latter citing it due to not involving Mattel, owners of the Barney franchise. Fred Holmes, a director on the show, was inquired to be in the documentary as well, but declined due to COVID-19 at the time.

Avallone tried to get American professional wrestler and actor John Cena in the documentary due to the love and hate parallels between him and Barney and also trying to keep with the tradition of having a wrestler in his productions. Another interviewee to be included was the person who portrayed Tinky Winky from the children's television series Teletubbies. Due to being in Europe, it did not work out. Stick Stickly, a character from Nickelodeon's Nick in the Afternoon was interviewed during production about where hate came from. His interview was cut out due to the crew not owning the copyright to the character.

=== Filming ===
Filming for various segments occurred between October 20, 2021 to May 2022 in New York, Texas, California, and Colorado. Production wrapped in September 2022.

== Release ==
I Love You, You Hate Me premiered on Peacock on October 12, 2022 during Peacock's DocFest, an on-platform showcase highlighting a selection from the streamer's top-tier documentary roster that's occurring for six-weeks. The series was originally meant to be three 45 minute episodes and was initially meant to air in August 2022 before being moved to October of that same year. The series was released in Canada in January 2023, being distributed by Lifetime. The first episode was available on January 9 while the second episode was available on January 16. On March 1, 2023, the documentary was released in South Africa on the streaming service Showmax. On January 23, 2024, the series was released on HBO Max in Latin America, where it was titled as Te Quiero Yo, Tú No A Mí. During its initial release in the Latin American market, it was the number one release on HBO Max in the country of Colombia. The series had a one night theatrical release on March 3, 2023 at the Smodcastle Cinemas in Atlantic Highlands, New Jersey.

=== Marketing ===
Footage of I Love You, You Hate Me was first seen on August 26, 2022 in the official trailer for "Peacock DocFest". The official trailer for the documentary was unlisted on Peacock's YouTube channel on September 23, 2022, before being officially released publicly on September 28, 2022. Due to the release of the trailer, Barney became the number one trending topic in the United States on Twitter on the same day of the trailer's public release.

Following the trailer's release, and leading up to the premiere of the documentary, Tommy Avallone, who directed the documentary, and Bob West, the original voice of Barney, did various interviews with various media outlets as well as a satellite media tour to discuss about the documentary.

== Reception ==
The review aggregator website Rotten Tomatoes reported a 78% approval rating for the series with an average rating of 7.50/10, based on nine reviews. Metacritic, which uses a weighted average, assigned a score of 65 out of 100 based on six critics, indicating "generally favorable reviews".

== See also ==
- Anti-Barney humor
- Buddy - Casper Kelly's 2026 analog horror parody film similar in content
- Hate-watching
