= Barney's Great Adventure =

1998 American film directed by Steve Gomer

- Theatrical release poster
- Directed by: Steve Gomer
- Screenplay by: Stephen White
- Story by: Stephen White; Sheryl Leach; Dennis DeShazer
- Based on: Barney & the Backyard Gang and Barney & Friends by Sheryl Leach & Kathy O'Rourke-Parker
- Produced by: Sheryl Leach; Dennis DeShazer
- Starring: George Hearn; Shirley Douglas; Trevor Morgan; Kyla Pratt; Diana Rice; Jeff Ayers; Jeff Brooks; Julie Johnson; David Joyner; Bob West; Patty Wirtz
- Cinematography: Sandi Sissel
- Edited by: Richard Halsey
- Music by: Van Dyke Parks (Credited only in trailer)
- Production companies: Lyons Partnership; Lyrick Studios
- Distributed by: PolyGram Filmed Entertainment
- Release dates: March 27, 1998 (Radio City Music Hall); April 3, 1998 (Worldwide)
- Running time: 76 minutes
- Countries: Canada; United States
- Languages: English; French
- Budget: $15 million
- Box office: $12 million

Barney's Great Adventure (also known by its promotional title Barney's Great Adventure: The Movie) is a 1998 musical comedy adventure film based on the children's television series Barney & Friends, featuring Barney the Dinosaur in his first feature-length film. The plot follows Barney, along with three young children named Cody, Abby, and Marcella, as they discover a magical egg in a barn. After learning that the egg contains a magical being, Barney and the gang must return the egg to the barn before it hatches. The film was written by Stephen White, directed by Steve Gomer, produced by Sheryl Leach and Lyrick Studios and released by PolyGram Filmed Entertainment on March 27, 1998, at Radio City Music Hall in New York and worldwide on April 3, 1998, in the United States and Canada at the height of Barney's popularity. It is the only theatrical Barney film as all other Barney films were direct-to-video productions.

The film received generally negative reviews from critics and was a box-office bomb, only grossing $12 million against a budget of $15 million. This was the third and final film to be produced by Lyrick Studios before it was acquired by and folded into HIT Entertainment on June 6, 2001.

== Plot ==
Siblings Cody, Abby, and baby Fig Newton, along with Abby's best friend Marcella Walker, travel to the Newtons' maternal grandparents' farm in Upstate New York for a full week during summer break. While the parents are lost, Cody feels disappointed about spending the week at the farm and is easily annoyed by the girls rubbing a Barney doll in his face, as he hates Barney.

Upon arriving in the town of Merrivale at the Greenfield family farm, Cody retreats to a bedroom to sulk, but Abby invites him to play, teasing him by waving the Barney doll in his face to start a game of "keep-away". Cody runs off with the doll and hides it in the bathroom when it suddenly comes to life as Barney the Dinosaur, who takes the girls to play in the barn. Cody follows but refuses to believe Barney is real.

That evening, after dinner, the family gathers on the porch, where Cody unsuccessfully tries convincing his grandparents of Barney's existence. After the Greenfields go inside, followed by Abby and Marcella, Barney suggests that Cody wish upon a star, which he does. A shooting star streaks across the sky, transforming into a magical egg that rolls into the barn.

The next morning, Cody awakens alongside Barney and follows the girls into the barn, where they find the egg. As the egg begins changing colors, Baby Bop appears, worried about her missing blankie, and Barney rushes off to change Fig's diaper before the grandparents see him. Abby and Marcella take the egg to their next-door neighbor, Mrs. Goldfinch, at the grandmother's suggestion, and after Cody catches up with Barney, they follow suit.

In Mrs. Goldfinch's house, Barney and the children discover a vast collection of books and fossilized eggshells. As the egg adds another color stripe, they learn that an egg falls from the sky every 1,000 years and hatches a being called a "Dreammaker", but only if it is placed exactly where it first touched down before its colors change. Cody accidentally sends the egg rolling onto a birdseed delivery truck. Barney and the children chase after it, building a makeshift horse chariot from household scrap.

Meanwhile, the town hosts its annual apple festival parade, which Baby Bop stops abruptly to search for her blankie. The truck driver swerves to avoid the parade, and Barney and the children chase the egg through the festivities. As the egg is launched across town, Barney gets help from his friend B.J. to catch the egg before it hits the ground. B.J. throws it onto the roof of the French restaurant Chez Snobbe. The egg lands in a woman's hat, and the children follow her inside to find it.

Inside, the children discover that the restaurant has sent the egg to a circus. They find the egg in the hands of a juggler, who tosses it into the air. When it starts raining, the children take cover in a dressing room, nearly losing hope. Encouraged by a motivational song from Barney, they resume their search. With help from a quirky carnival worker, they discover it is inside one of many hot-air balloons used as ballast. Cody imagines a plane from a log to catch the balloon but forgets how to picture himself flying it. The group chases the balloon, retrieving it from the operator, but are forced to crash-land in the barn. The children recount their adventure to the Greenfields, and Barney startles them by emerging from a hay bale. The final color stripe on the egg changes, and the children rush to the barn, but Cody trips, causing the egg to fly again. Luckily, Baby Bop arrives just in time to save it with her blankie.

The egg finally hatches into a Dreammaker, a koala-like creature, named Twinken, who shows everyone Abby's and Barney's dreams during the night. Cody apologizes to Barney, and they share a hug. Twinken puts on a fireworks display that lands in Barney's arms. As Baby Bop gets sleepy, B.J. starts walking her home, and they vanish. Twinken sits beside Barney, who has reverted to his doll form, on the front porch swing as Fig says his first word: "Barney."

== Cast ==
- David Joyner as Barney (costume)
  - Bob West as Barney (voice)
- Trevor Morgan as Cody Newton
- Diana Rice as Abigail "Abby" Newton
- Kyla Pratt as Marcella Walker
- Jeff Ayers as Baby Bop (costume)
  - Julie Johnson as Baby Bop (voice)
- Jeff Brooks as B.J. (costume)
  - Patty Wirtz as B.J. (voice)
- George Hearn as Grandpa Greenfield
- Shirley Douglas as Grandma Greenfield
- David and Edouard Larouche as Fig Newton
- Renee Madeline Le Guerrier as Mrs. Goldfinch
- Roch Jutras as Mr. Millet
- Alan Fawcett as Dad (Mr. Newton)
- Jane Wheeler as Mom (Mrs. Newton)

== Production ==
=== Development ===
In the early 1990s, a retreat was held at the Leach Austin Lakewood House, and it was there that the idea of a Barney movie was brought up as a goal and desire for Barney, as it was written on a piece of paper. Word of a Barney film first arose in November 1992 when Debbie Ries, sales director for The Lyons Group said plans for a movie was in the works. In 1993, it was later announced by creator Sheryl Leach at The National Press Club in Washington, D.C. that a movie is coming. Later in 1994, a Barney Magazine article had stated that Barney the Dinosaur would star in his first ever film entitled Barney: The Movie. At the time of development, around the mid-nineties, all the major film studios wanted to do a Barney feature, with production companies pitching to the owners of Barney. One studio even assembled executives together to sing "I Love You" to Sheryl Leach when she arrived to the respective studio.

Trey Parker, co-creator of South Park, stated that he was offered $1.5 million to direct Barney’s Great Adventure after the underground success of The Spirit of Christmas. According to Parker, producers believed his ability to create humorous content with children made him a suitable choice for the project. However, he declined the offer. According to Stephen White, who wrote the film, actor Daniel Stern voiced interest in directing the film. The film was originally going to be distributed worldwide by Geffen Pictures through Warner Bros. and produced by Sheryl Leach and Dennis DeShazer. Publicity shots of Barney alongside American film producer David Geffen were taken on the Warners Bros. lot in the early 1990s to promote the news. Warner Bros. and Lyons had disagreements over marketing, leading the latter to bring the film (with help from now former producer Geffen) to PolyGram.

Steve Gomer, the director of the film, was approached for the film by an individual who called in regards that a musical Barney film was being made. Gomer had no interest in being a part of the Barney & Friends television series, but expressed interest in doing the film.

=== Casting ===
On July 25, 1996, it was announced that John Travolta, Demi Moore, Rosie O’Donnell, Arnold Schwarzenegger, and Maria Shriver were expected to make cameos in the film. These cameos never occurred in the final film. Actress Mara Wilson was offered a role in the film, but turned it down out of frustration of being branded in "cute" movies. According to Stephen White, American dancer, singer and actor Donald O'Connor was willing to portray Grandpa Greenfield in the film but was turned down by the film's producers.

=== Filming ===
Steve Gomer expressed desire to work in Montreal, Canada to save on the cost of filming. To Sheryl Leach, it was a joy of filming as she stated:

It was a joy to do the film because it took me back to the early days in Barney's development. Just like the beginning days of Barney, this movie takes him to places children have never experienced with him before. The film was a great opportunity to open new storylines and environments so that children travel to new places with their friend Barney. The film goes to some incredible places that we hope will appeal not only for children but to adults as well.

Leach adds that the film allowed them to "take the familiar Barney and put him outdoors and in other very different settings from his traditional environments."

Production began in early July 1997 to and wrapped in mid-September of that same year. It was filmed in locations outside Montreal, Canada, including the renowned Ste. Anne de Bellevue's Morgan Arboretum, a popular wildlife sanctuary. The veteran film crew was initially a bit skeptical of the large purple star.

=== Original version ===
According to writer Stephen White, he penned an initial script that was cut down for being too lengthy. In the original script, the egg was going to hatch a giant bird who misses its mother, Baby Bop and BJ were expected to make a lot more screen time, appearing in the farmhouse attic, but those scenes were soon scrapped, as director Steve Gomer claimed the scenes to be "unaffordable", Miss Goldfinch was originally planned to be a comedic character, as opposed to the more subdued character of the final film, the circus scenes and the "Collector" character were not in the original drafts, as well as rather than using a log, Barney and the gang would have built a plane out of cardboard boxes, and the film originally saw the main characters each have their own dreams and desires fulfilled by the end of the film.

== Release ==
The film was initially scheduled to be released through Geffen Pictures and Warner Bros. in January 1995 before being delayed to the summer of 1995 and it was pushed back again to 1996 and later delayed for a release of 1997. In that same year of 1997, Polygram grabbed the distribution rights from Geffen and Warner Bros with a new release of 1998. The film held its world premiere on March 27, 1998, at Radio City Music Hall, the same stage where Barney performed twelve sold-out concerts four years before. Shortly thereafter, it was widely released in the US and Canada on April 3, 1998. The film was shown primarily at matinees to age discounted ticket holders. The film also had a premiere in the United Kingdom in London on June 26, 1998, with a wider release occurring on July 17, 1998. The film would continue to be released internationally throughout 1998 until the early 2000s.

=== Marketing ===
On June 19, 1997, Barney himself announced his film at a news conference at the Beverly Hills Hotel. He arrived in a Hawaiian shirt and sunglasses, from a chauffeur-driven Cadillac at the hotel. During the event, he met with the press, handed out T-shirts and plush toys while also promoting the film. Later in 1997, teaser trailers for the film arose on VHS cassettes with some Barney Home Videos, including the VHS releases Barney's Adventure Bus, Barney's Good Day Good Night, and Barney in Outer Space. Confirmed promotional partners for the film included Southwest Airlines, Chef Boyardee, Planet Hollywood, Luvs, and New Balance. To promote the film, Barney, Baby Bop and BJ performed "Imagine" on November 27, 1997, in the Macy's Thanksgiving Day Parade. On March 3, 1998, Barney donated a pair of overalls from the film to Planet Hollywood, a Hollywood-inspired themed restaurant chain. In honor of the film, a television special titled Barney's First Adventures aired on March 28, 1998, on Fox Kids. It was soon released as a bonus feature on the DVD release of the film. On April 8, 1998, Barney appeared La Brea Tar Pits in Los Angeles, California to put his footprints in cement to promote the release of the movie.

Nine books based on the film were released. Also based on the film were toys and games released by Hasbro. Playskool, a subsidiary of Hasbro, also supported the film with a sweepstakes where the grand prizes included a trip to Universal Orlando Resort to meet Barney and friends backstage at A Day in the Park with Barney, a family trip to London and VIP tickets to see Barney's Big Surprise, and a family trip to New York City to be special guests in the Macy's Thanksgiving Day Parade during Barney's performance. Secondary prizes include fifty winners receiving a Barney Song Magic Banjo and one-hundred winners receiving an autographed Barney photograph.

=== Home media ===
Barney's Great Adventure was available for pre-order on August 7, 1998. The film was released at a suggested retail price of $22.95 on VHS and DVD on September 1, 1998, by Polygram Video. PolyGram expected to sell three to five million copies of the film on home video. With the suggested retail price of $22.95, the projection translated into a gross revenue of between $69 million and $114 million, which is far above what the film made at the box-office. Plans for the home video release included no less than nine cross-promotional partners, several of which are prominent in supermarkets. The list includes Kelloggs, Smuckers, Tyson chicken, Luv's Diapers and TDK blank videocassettes. Others are Hasbro, Microsoft, Advo/Mailboxes Plus and Polaroid. Polaroid, TDK and Kellogg sponsored an "I Love You" singing contest in 2,300 Walmart stores in the US on September 12, 1998, where consumers could be videotaped singing "I Love You" to win a possible trip to visit A Day in the Park with Barney. Kellogg followed up with a Barney cereal bowl giveaway with purchase. After PolyGram went defunct, the film was re-released by PolyGram's successor, Universal Pictures. The film was re-released again on DVD in 2015 with a "Happy Faces" cover. The film was also released on the streaming service Peacock on its launch date in July 2020.

The film debuted at #9 on the Top Video Sales Billboard chart on September 26, 1998 and debuted at #1 on the Billboard Top Kid Video chart on October 3, 1998. The video would stay on the Top Kid Video chart for twenty-seven weeks until April 3, 1999. For the year in review, Barney's Great Adventure was #84 on the top Top Video Sales of 1998 according to Billboard. The DVD release of this video in the United Kingdom, spent three weeks on the Official Video Chart for OCC, entering and peaking at #43 on June 5, 2004. The VHS release of this video in the United Kingdom spent eight weeks on the respective chart, entering and peaking on June 5, 2004.

== Reception ==
=== Box office ===
In its limited release weekend, the film grossed $2,203,865 from 540 theaters and ranked number 11. A week later, in wide release, it grossed $1,382,373 from 809 theaters and ranked number 15. By the end of its run, the film grossed $12,218,638 in the domestic box office. In the United Kingdom, the film made a total of £2.2 million (which is $2,842,598 in the US) bringing the film's total box-office to break even with the film's budget. During the week of the film's release in Scotland, the film managed to gross $44,495 from seventeen screens.

=== Critical response ===
Barney's Great Adventure received mixed to negative reviews from film critics, owing to it being based on the aforementioned television program which is aimed for young children aged 2–7, the growing popularity of "anti-Barney humor", and the general unpopularity of the Barney series outside of its target audience of preschoolers. The review aggregator website Rotten Tomatoes reported an approval rating of 33% with an average score of 5.00/10, based on 24 reviews. The website's critical consensus reads, "Barney's friends are big and small / They come from lots of places / But after this film, their parents / Will be left with pained faces". On Metacritic, the film has a score of 44 out of 100 based on 18 critics, indicating "mixed or average" reviews.

John Petrakis of the Chicago Tribune wrote, "If my 21-month-old son had any inkling that I was giving a less than stellar review to [this film,] he would no doubt shoot me that look he tends to give when his milk is warm or his Cheerios a bit stale." The New York Times' Anita Gates wrote that it was a film "his young, undemanding fans are likely to enjoy." Roger Ebert gave the film three stars out of four and said: "Barney has his own movie. Not one of those videos you've watched a hundred times, but a real movie, more than an hour long. If you like him on TV, you'll like him here, too, because it's more of the same stuff, only outdoors and with animals and shooting stars and the kinds of balloons people can go up in."

Another review, from the Los Angeles Times, read: "The creators of the great purple scourge, Barney the Dinosaur, have an unspoken contract with parents palatable for all involved: We buy their videos and an occasional plush toy for our 3- and 4-year-olds and make Barney's brain trust obscenely wealthy; they in turn create benignly lobotomized entertainment that holds our non-demanding kids in thrall; our kids watch TV and allow us a few precious minutes of peace. The most important element is parental trust in Barney to be blandly wholesome, so that we have to endure only a few seconds of it while we cue up the VCR for our tykes. Family movies, on the other hand, imply a rather different contract: Parents buy tickets and popcorn for the whole family; filmmakers deliver light entertainment that kowtows to kids yet is not so brain-dead as to alienate sentient adults. 'Barney's Great Adventure: The Movie,' the first theatrical film featuring the green-bellied beast, takes that big old fat foot of Barney's and stomps that contract beyond recognition. [. . .] The flat lighting and two-dimensional sets of the TV screen serve Barney far better than a modestly expanded budget and a director insistent on using locations, romantic lighting and mildly adventurous camera angles. Barney looks both more real and more magical on video; on film, he's clearly a doofus in a felt outfit."

=== Accolades ===
The film was nominated for two awards at the 19th Golden Raspberry Awards: Barney himself was nominated "Worst New Star", but lost to a tie with Jerry Springer in Ringmaster and Joe Eszterhas in An Alan Smithee Film: Burn Hollywood Burn. The Jerry Herman-penned "Barney, the Song" was nominated for "Worst Original Song", but lost to "I Wanna Be Mike Ovitz!" from An Alan Smithee Film: Burn Hollywood Burn. It also received three nominations at the 1998 Stinkers Bad Movie Awards.

== See also ==
- List of films featuring dinosaurs
