= List of artists who have recorded "Jingle Bells" =

This is a list of notable artists who have recorded "Jingle Bells".

== A ==
- Cliff Adams Singers – on the album Sing Something Simple at Christmas
- Yolanda Adams – on the album What a Wonderful Time (2007)
- The Alphablocks sang their own version in their special "Letters to Santa" (2021)
- Herb Alpert & the Tijuana Brass – on Christmas Album (1968)
- Ames Brothers – on the album There'll Always Be a Christmas (1957)
- Jon Anderson – on the album 3 Ships (1985)
- Tuck Andress – on the album Hymns, Carols and Songs About Snow (1991)
- Julie Andrews and André Previn – on the album A Christmas Treasure (1967)
- The Andrews Sisters – on the album Christmas with The Andrews Sisters (1943)
- Paul Anka – on the album It's Christmas Everywhere (1960)
- David Arkenstone – on the album Christmas Lounge (2008)
- Chet Atkins – on the album Christmas with Chet Atkins (1961)
- Gene Autry – on the album Christmastime With Gene Autry (1956)

== B ==
- Barenaked Ladies – on the album Barenaked for the Holidays (2004)
- Barney and the Backyard Gang – in the video Waiting For Santa (1990)
- Basshunter – single that reached number 35 in the UK Singles Chart (2006)
- Bassjackers – on the album Home Alone (On The Night Before Christmas (2020)
- Count Basie and His Orchestra – single (1962)
- The Beatles – on a fan Christmas record (1964)
- Drake Bell – from the film Merry Christmas, Drake & Josh (2008), and featured on the album Merry Nickmas (2012)
- Tony Bennett – on the album Snowfall: The Tony Bennett Christmas Album (1968)
- Big Bad Voodoo Daddy – on the album Everything You Want for Christmas (2004)
- Blue Blood – on the album St. Nick's Got the Blues (2014)
- The cast of Blue's Clues & You! - in "Blue's Night Before Christmas" (2020)
- Andrea Bocelli with the Muppets – on the album My Christmas (2009)
- Boney M. – on Christmas Album (1981)
- Booker T. & the M.G.'s – on the album In the Christmas Spirit (1966)
- Pat Boone – on the album White Christmas (1959)
- Will Bradley and His Boogie Woogie Boys – as "Jingle Bells Boogie Woogie"; single (1943)
- The Brady Bunch – on the album Christmas with The Brady Bunch (1970)
- Brave Combo – on the album It's Christmas, Man! (1992)
- Jim Brickman – on the album Peace (2003)
- Dave Brubeck – on the album A Dave Brubeck Christmas (1996)
- Michael Bublé featuring The Puppini Sisters – performed a reimagined Jazz version of the song on the album Christmas (2011)
- Roy Budd Trio – on the album Have a Jazzy Christmas
- Jimmy Buffett – on the album Christmas Island (1998)

== C ==
- Ann Hampton Callaway – on the album This Christmas (1998)
- Royce Campbell – on the album A Jazz Guitar Christmas (2004)
- Canadian Brass – on the album Christmas with the Canadian Brass (1981)
- Ace Cannon – on the album Christmas Cheers (1964)
- Don Carlos & Glenice Spencer – on the album Ras Records Presents a Reggae Christmas
- The Carpenters – on the album Christmas Portrait (1978)
- Benny Carter and His Swing Quartet – single (1936)
- Ray Charles Singers – on the album Winter Wonderland (1956)
- Kenny Chesney – on the album All I Want for Christmas Is a Real Good Tan (2003)
- Chicago – on the album Chicago XXXIII: O Christmas Three (2011)
- The Chipmunks – on the album Christmas with The Chipmunks (1962)
- Nicholas Christie - on the album Approve my Expense Report for Christmas (2019)
- The Clancy Brothers – on the album Christmas (1969)
- Eric Clapton - on the album Happy Xmas (2018)
- Richard Clayderman – on Christmas (1982)
- Rosemary Clooney – on the album Christmas with Rosemary Clooney (1978)
- Natalie Cole – on the album Holly & Ivy (1994)
- Nat King Cole – on the album The Christmas Collection
- Bootsy Collins – on the album Christmas Is 4 Ever (2006)
- Judy Collins – on the album Christmas at The Biltmore Estate (1997)
- Perry Como – on the 78 rpm record set Perry Como Sings Merry Christmas Music (1946)
- Harry Connick Jr. – on What a Night! A Christmas Album (2008)
- Ray Conniff and the Singers – on the album Christmas with Conniff (1959)
- Crazy Frog – "Jingle Bells/U Can't Touch This" – single (2005), reached #5 in the UK Singles Chart
- Jim Cregan – on the album The Carols of Christmas II (1997)
- Bing Crosby – B–side of "White Christmas" single (1970)
- Bing Crosby and the Andrews Sisters – single (1943)

== D ==
- Danny Davis and the Nashville Brass – as "Jingling Brass"; on the album Christmas with Danny Davis and the Nashville Brass (1970)
- Sammy Davis Jr. – on the album Goodyear: The Great Songs of Christmas, Album Five (1965)
- Lenny Dee (organist) – on the album Happy Holi–Dee (1961)
- Jimmy Dean – on the album Jimmy Dean's Christmas Card (1965)
- Waldo de los Ríos – on the album Christmas with Waldo de los Rios (1973)
- John Denver – on the album Whose Garden Was This (1970) & the album "Christmas, Like a Lullaby" (1990)
- Frank De Vol and the Rainbow Strings – on the album The Old Sweet Songs of Christmas (1960)
- Arielle Dombasle - single (2024)
- Plácido Domingo, Michael Bolton and Ying Huang – on the album Merry Christmas from Vienna (1997)
- Fats Domino – on the album Christmas Is a Special Day (1975)
- Dora the Explorer sang a Nochebuena version of the song on Dora's Christmas (2009)
- Johnny Dowd – on the album The Pawnbroker's Wife (2002)
- Judge Dread – single (1978), reached #64 on the UK Singles Chart

== E ==
- Edison Male Quartette – on an Edison cylinder (1788)
- Duke Ellington and His Orchestra – on the album Jingle Bell Jazz (1962)
- Elmo & Patsy – on the album Grandma Got Run Over by a Reindeer (1984)
- Emilia & Sakis Coucos – single (2015)
- En Vogue – on the album The Gift of Christmas (2002)
- Esquivel – on the album Merry Xmas from the Space–Age Bachelor Pad (1996)

== F ==
- The Fab Four (Beatles tribute band) – on the album Have Yourself a FAB-ulous Little Christmas (2002)
- The Fall - on the album Cerebral Caustic (2006)
- John Fahey - on the album The John Fahey Christmas Album (1994)
- Jose Feliciano – on the album Feliz Navidad (1970)
- Ferrante & Teicher – on the album Snowbound (1962)
- Arthur Fiedler and the Boston Pops Orchestra – on the album Pops Christmas Party (1959)
- Eddie Fisher – on the album Christmas with Eddie Fisher (1952)
- Ella Fitzgerald – on the album Ella Wishes You a Swinging Christmas (1960)
- Béla Fleck and the Flecktones – on the album Jingle All the Way (2008)
- Tennessee Ernie Ford – on the album C-H-R-I-S-T-M-A-S (1971)
- Foster and Allen – on Foster and Allen's Christmas Video
- Pete Fountain – on the album ″Candy Clarinet″: Merry Christmas from Pete Fountain (1967)
- The Four Aces – on the album Merry Christmas with the Four Aces

== G ==
- Jan Garber and His Orchestra – on the album Christmas Dance Party (1959)
- Jackie Gleason – on the album Merry Christmas (1956)
- Cast of Glee (television series) – on Glee: The Music, The Christmas Album (2010)
- Edyta Górniak – on the album Zakochaj się na Święta w kolędach (2008)
- Gonzo – as part of the Christmas/Patriotic medley with Hal Linden on The Muppet Show (1981)
- Benny Goodman and His Orchestra – single (1935)
- Ron Goodwin and His Orchestra – on the album Christmas Wonderland (1967)
- Morton Gould – on the album A Musical Christmas Tree (1969)
- Francis Goya – on the album Christmas Party (1978)
- Earl Grant – on the album Winter Wonderland (1965)
- Al Green – on the album White Christmas (1983), also released on Christmas Album
- Grenadine – on the album Goya (1992)
- The cast of Gullah Gullah Island - in the episode "A Gullah Gullah Christmas" (1998)

== H ==
- Merle Haggard – on the album Merle Haggard's Christmas Present (1973)
- The Haydn Quartet (1902)
- The Reverend Horton Heat – on the album We Three Kings (2005)
- Bobby Helms – on the album Jingle Bell Rock (1970)
- Woody Herman and His Orchestra – single (1942)
- Tiny Hill and His Orchestra – single (1939)
- Gary Hoey – on the album Ho! Ho! Hoey (1995)
- Hollyridge Strings – on the album Christmas Favorites (1965)
- Lena Horne – as "Jingle All the Way"; on the album Merry from Lena (1966)
- Ralph Hunter Choir – on the album Christmas Surprises from the Ralph Hunter Choir (1959)
- Ferlin Husky – on the album Christmas All Year Long (1967)
- The Hysterics – single (1981), reached number 44 in the UK Singles Chart

== I ==
- Ira Ironstrings – as "Jingle Bells Stomp"; on the album Ira Ironstrings Plays Santa Claus (1959)
- Burl Ives – on Christmas Album (1968)

== J ==
- Alan Jackson – on the album Let It Be Christmas (2002)
- Boney James – on the album Boney's Funky Christmas (1993)
- Etta James – on the album 12 Songs of Christmas (1998)
- George Jones – appears on Greatest Children's Christmas Hits (1991)
- Jack Jones – on the album A Jack Jones Christmas (1969)
- Spike Jones
- Bradley Joseph – on the album Classic Christmas (2008)

== K ==
- Sammy Kaye and His Orchestra – on the album I Want to Wish You a Merry Christmas (1957)
- The Kidsongs Kids – on the album and video We Wish You a Merry Christmas (1993)
- Kitaro – on the album Peace on Earth (1996)
- Gladys Knight & the Pips – on the album That Special Time of the Year (1982)
- Andre Kostelanetz and His Orchestra – on the album Wonderland of Christmas (1963)
- Diana Krall – B–side of "Have Yourself a Merry Little Christmas" (1998)
- Gene Krupa Jazz Trio(1945)

== L ==
- Lester Lanin – on the album Christmas Dance Party (1959)
- Julius La Rosa – as "Campanelle"; single (1954)
- Brenda Lee – B-side of the Japanese "White Christmas" single (1965)
- Peggy Lee – subtitled "I Like a Sleighride"; on the album Christmas Carousel (1960)
- Raymond Lefevre and His Orchestra – on the album Merry Christmas (1968)
- The Lennon Sisters – on the album Christmas with the Lennon Sisters (1960)
- Crystal Lewis – on the album Holiday! A Collection of Christmas Classics (2000)
- Ramsey Lewis Trio – on the album More Sounds of Christmas (1964)
- Liberace – on the album Twas The Night Before Christmas (1974)
- Big Tiny Little – on the album Christmas with "Big" Tiny Little (1961)
- Living Strings & Living Voices – on the album White Christmas (1968)
- Kimberley Locke – on the album Christmas (2007)
- Lisa Loeb – on the album Maybe This Christmas Tree (2004)
- Ella Logan – as "Jingle (Bingle) Bells"; single (1938)
- Guy Lombardo and His Royal Canadians – on the album Jingle Bells (1956)
- Lonestar – on the album My Christmas List (2007)
- The Looney Tunes cast - on the album A Looney Tunes Sing-A-Long Christmas (2007)
- Vincent Lopez and His Orchestra – on the album Christmas Music (1957)
- Los Del Rio
- Geoff Love and His Orchestra – on the album Christmas with Love (1972)
- The Norman Luboff Choir – on the album Christmas with the Norman Luboff Choir (1964)
- Loretta Lynn – on the album White Christmas Blue (2016)

== M ==
- Gisele Mackenzie – on the album Christmas with Gisele (1957)
- Henry Mancini – on the album A Merry Mancini Christmas (1966)
- The Manhattan Transfer – on the album An Acapella Christmas (2005)
- Barry Manilow and Exposé – single, also included on the album Because It's Christmas (1990)
- Johnny Mann Singers – on the album We Wish You a Merry Christmas (1967)
- Mannheim Steamroller – on the album Christmas in the Aire (1995)
- Mantovani – on the album Christmas Greetings from Mantovani and His Orchestra (1963)
- Wynton Marsalis – on the album Crescent City Christmas Card (1989)
- Dean Martin – on the album The Dean Martin Christmas Album (1966)
- Freddy Martin and His Orchestra
- Kyle Massey - performed a reimagined Hip-Hop version on the album Disney Channel Holiday (2007)
- Johnny Mathis – on the album Christmas Eve with Johnny Mathis (1986)
- Paul Mauriat and His Orchestra – on The Christmas Album (1967)
- Scotty McCreery – on the album Christmas with Scotty (2012)
- Michael McDonald – single, also included on the album Through the Many Winters: A Christmas Album (2005)
- Jimmy McGriff – on the album Christmas with McGriff (1963)
- Katharine McPhee – on the album Christmas Is the Time to Say I Love You (2010)
- George Melachrino and His Orchestra – on the album Christmas Joy (1959)
- Johnny Mercer and The Pied Pipers – single (1947)
- Mickey Mouse, Minnie Mouse and Goofy
- Glenn Miller and His Orchestra – single (1941), reached #5 on the Billboard chart
- Mitch Miller – on the album Holiday Sing Along with Mitch (1961)
- The Million Dollar Quartet (Elvis Presley, Carl Perkins, Jerry Lee Lewis) – 1956
- Mills Brothers – on the album Merry Christmas (1959)
- Momoiro Clover Z – for their children's educational program, and album, "Guchoki Party" (2020)
- Lou Monte – as "Italian Jingle Bells"; single (1955)
- The Moog Cookbook – on the album Bartell (2005)
- Art Mooney and His Orchestra – single (1949)

== N ==
- Jim Nabors – on Jim Nabors' Christmas Album (1967)
- Sharon Needles – on the album Christmas Queens (2015)
- Ozzie Nelson and His Orchestra – single (1935)
- Willie Nelson – on the album Pretty Paper (1979)
- Wayne Newton – on the album Christmas Isn't Christmas Without You (1968)
- Nitty Gritty Dirt Band – on The Christmas Album (1997)

== O ==
- Anita O'Day – on the album Have a Merry Christmas with Anita O'Day (2013)
- Eugene Ormandy and the Philadelphia Orchestra – on the album A Christmas Festival (1964)
- The Osmonds – on the album Osmond Family Christmas (1976)
- Buck Owens – on the album Christmas with Buck Owens and his Buckaroos (1965)

== P ==
- Patti Page – on the album Christmas with Patti Page (1955)
- Brad Paisley – on the album Brad Paisley Christmas (2006)
- Dolly Parton – on the album Home for Christmas (1990)
- The Partridge Family – on the album A Partridge Family Christmas Card (1971)
- Don Patterson – on the album Holiday Soul (1964)
- Les Paul and Mary Ford – released as a single and included on the album Yule Cool (1951)
- Luciano Pavarotti – on the album Christmas Favorites from the World's Favorite Tenors (1991)
- Pearl Jam – on the fan club release "Christmas 2007"
- Pentatonix - on the album Christmas Is Here! (2018)
- Duke Pearson – on the album Merry Ole Soul (1969)
- Oscar Peterson – on the album An Oscar Peterson Christmas (1995)
- Philadelphia Orchestra – on the album A Christmas Festival (1964)
- Wilson Pickett – on the album Christmas Soul Special (1982)
- Ray Price – on The Ray Price Christmas Album (1969)
- The cast of The Puzzle Place with Patti LaBelle - in the video Deck the Halls (1996)

== R ==
- Rainbow Dash (Ashleigh Ball) – on the album My Little Pony: Friendship is Magic – It's a Pony Kind of Christmas (2016)
- Boots Randolph – on the album Boots and Stockings (1969)
- Lou Rawls – on the album Lou Rawls Christmas (2006)
- Dianne Reeves – on the album Yule Be Boppin' (1997)
- Jim Reeves – on the album Twelve Songs of Christmas (1963)
- Harry Reser and His Orchestra – single (1934)
- André Rieu – on the album The Christmas I Love (1997)
- Riley–Farley and Their Orchestra – single (1936)
- Smokey Robinson and the Miracles – on the album The Season for Miracles (1970)
- The Roches – on the album We Three Kings (1990)
- Rico Rodriguez – single credited to 'Rico & All Stars' (1967)
- Pete Rugolo and His Orchestra - as "Jingle Bells Mambo"; from the album Adventures in Rhythm (1954)
- Bobby Rydell and Chubby Checker – as "Jingle Bells Imitations"; B-side of "Jingle Bell Rock" single (1961). It was featured on their album, Bobby Rydell/Chubby Checker.

== S ==
- Sandler and Young – on the album The Christmas World of Tony Sandler & Ralph Young (1968)
- Santo & Johnny – as "Twistin' Bells"; single (1960)
- Domenico Savino and His Orchestra – on the album Hi-Fi Christmas Party (1958)
- Primo Scala and His Banjo and Accordion Orchestra – single (1948)
- Walter Schumann – on the album Christmas in the Air! (1951)
- Earl Scruggs – on the album A Very Special Acoustic Christmas (2003)
- Joe Scruggs – on the album Merry Christmas (1997)
- The Seekers – on the album Morningtown Ride to Christmas (2001)
- The Sesame Street cast – at the end of Elmo's World: Happy Holidays (2002)
- The Brian Setzer Orchestra – on the album Boogie Woogie Christmas (2002)
- Shakatak – on the album Christmas Dreams (1992)
- William Shatner - on the album Shatner Claus (2018)
- SHeDAISY – on the album Brand New Year (2000)
- Dinah Shore - on the album Season's Best (1960)
- Frank Sinatra – on the album A Jolly Christmas from Frank Sinatra (1957)
- The Singing Dogs – single (1955)
- Six By Seven – on the split Christmas EP with Echoboy (1999)
- Skid Row – on the album Monster Ballads Xmas (2007)
- Mark E. Smith (The Fall) - on the album Cerebral Caustic (2006)
- Jimmy Smith – on the album Christmas '64 (1964)
- Kate Smith – on the album Christmas with Kate (1959)
- Keely Smith – on the album A Keely Christmas (1960)
- Michael W. Smith – on the album Christmastime (1998)
- The Springfields – B–side of Dusty Springfield's "O Holy Child" (1964)
- Jo Stafford – on the album The Joyful Season (1964)
- The Statler Brothers – on the album Christmas Card (1978)
- Gwen Stefani – on the album You Make It Feel Like Christmas (2017)
- Slam Stewart Quintet – single (1945)
- Sufjan Stevens – on the album Songs for Christmas (2006)
- Straight No Chaser – on the album Christmas Cheers (2009)
- George Strait – on the album Fresh Cut Christmas (2006)
- Barbra Streisand – on A Christmas Album (1967)
- The Swingle Singers – on the album Christmastime (1968)

== T ==
- Take 6 – on the album The Most Wonderful Time of the Year (2010)
- James Taylor – on the album James Taylor at Christmas (2004)
- Lynda Thomas – Eurodance single (1997)
- Butch Thompson – on the album Yulestride (1994)
- The Three Stooges – single
- The Three Suns – on the album A Ding Dong Dandy Christmas (1959)
- Tingstad and Rumbel – on the album The Gift (1985)
- Meghan Trainor – for Amazon Music Original

== V ==
- The Vamps – on the album Meet the Vamps: Christmas Edition (2014)
- Randy Van Horne Singers – on the album Sleighride (1960)
- Billy Vaughn and His Orchestra – on the album Christmas Carols (1958)
- The Ventures – on The Ventures' Christmas Album (1965)
- Rhonda Vincent – on the album Beautiful Star: A Christmas Collection (2006)
- Bobby Vinton – on the album A Very Merry Christmas (1964)

== W ==
- Jerry Jeff Walker – on the album Christmas Gonzo Style (1994)
- Fats Waller – as "Swingin' Them Jingle Bells"; single (1936)
- Steve Wariner – on the album Guitar Christmas (2010)
- Fred Waring and the Pennsylvanians – on the album ′Twas the Night Before Christmas (1955)
- Lawrence Welk and His Champagne Music – on the album Jingle Bells (1957)
- Roger Whittaker
- The Wiggles – on Wiggly, Wiggly Christmas (1996 album, 1997 video)
- The Williams Brothers - on The Williams Brothers Christmas Album (1970)
- Andy Williams – on The Andy Williams Christmas Album (1963)
- Joe Williams – "Bombay Dub Orchestra Remix" on Christmas Remixed 2 (2005) and featured in the film Iron Man 3 (2013)
- Roger Williams – on the album Christmas Time (1959)
- Carnie Wilson – on the album Christmas with Carnie (2007)
- BeBe & CeCe Winans – on the album First Christmas (1993)
- Klaus Wunderlich – on the album Jingle Bells

== Y ==
- Yello – released as a single and also featured on the soundtrack of the film The Santa Clause (1995)
- The Yobs – on The Yobs Christmas Album (1980)
- Yogi Yorgesson – as "Yingle Bells" (1949), hit single with a 'Swedish dialect' version
- James Yuill – version played on beer glasses for a Guinness advert (2010)
