= Barney in Concert =

- Written by: Kathy Parker; Sheryl Leach; Dennis DeShazer
- Directed by: Jim Rowley
- Starring: Rickey Carter; Brian Eppes; Leah Gloria; Alexander Jhin; Julie Johnson; Becky Swonke; Bob West; Jessica Zucha
- Music by: Bob Singleton
- Country of origin: United States
- Original language: English

Production
- Producer: Dennis DeShazer
- Editor: McKee Smith
- Running time: 46 minutes
- Production company: The Lyons Group

Original release
- Release: July 29, 1991

Barney in Concert is a Barney & the Backyard Gang stage show, which was performed live on May 26, 1991. The May 26th performance was released on video on July 29, 1991, in the United States.

== Plot ==
The video begins at the Majestic Theater in Dallas, Texas, where an audience takes their seats in time for the concert to begin. As the auditorium lights dim, an unseen voice is heard saying "Shimbaree shimbarah!" and Barney enters the stage and greets the audience, as the "Barney Theme Song" plays. Barney welcomes the audience to his first concert and begins by singing "Everyone Is Special", about how special they are. After that, he asks the audience if they'd like to meet the Backyard Gang. As the curtain begins to rise, the Backyard Gang - Michael, Amy, Tina, Luci, Adam and Derek - is welcomed on stage and they sing "The Backyard Gang Rap".

Next, Michael announces that for their next song, he asks the audience to sing a line with the cast. They all sing "We Are Barney & the Backyard Gang". After that, they take a bow. Then, Barney asks Tina about farm animals. They ask the audience to say farm animal sounds - including the "pee-yoo" of a skunk, which isn't actually its own sound. They sing "Down on Grandpa's Farm", accompanied by five costumed farm animals. Next, Michael, Amy, Luci and Adam appear in soldier outfits, march on stage, singing "The Noble Duke of York" with Barney.

After that, Derek instructs the audience that for the next song - "Pop Goes the Weasel" - they will clap whenever they hear the word "pop". Barney and Derek sing it, while the audience claps every time "Pop Goes the Weasel" is sung. Michael and Luci then select several young children from the audience to sing "The Alphabet Song" with them in three different languages - English, Hebrew and French.

Next, Luci instructs the audience for a fingerplay song "Where is Thumbkin?" and identifies the fingers on one hand. After that, a costumed five-humped camel appears on stage. Barney and Luci sing "Sally the Camel", as each hump is subtracted one by one until Sally becomes a "horse"! After that, Sally leaves the stage and the audience says goodbye to her.

Next, Barney plans to surprise the Backyard Gang with a friend of his. He does the Barney Shake and makes another dinosaur pop out of a giant box, but warns the audience to not tell them until it's ready. Then he leads them, along with the audience, to sing "Mr. Knickerbocker". When they finish, a shy, green triceratops pops out of the box, surprising the kids. To the tune to the previous song, the kids claim her name is Baby Bop, based on her young age and dance moves! Barney tells Baby Bop it's okay to feel shy, but everyone is so happy to meet her. Feeling excited to have new friends, Baby Bop performs "Baby Bop's Street Dance".

Next, Baby Bop asks the audience to do another fingerplay with her - "The Itsy Bitsy Spider", as a spider appears on stage. After that, Barney, Adam, Tina, and Luci sing "Bubble, Bubble Bath" as they pretend to take a bath. After that, a firetruck comes on stage and Baby Bop, Michael, Amy and Derek appear in firefighter outfits, sing "Hurry, Hurry, Drive the Firetruck".

Next, Barney returns to the stage dressed as a railroad engineer, singing "Down by the Station", and asks the audience to repeat every line after him. Then they sing it altogether. Next, Barney, Baby Bop and the kids sing "You're a Grand Old Flag" in salute to America, as they lead the audience to march to the beat and wave flags.

For the grand finale, the whole cast and the audience sing "I Love You". Then they say goodbye as the curtain closes. Barney comes out once more, giving a big kiss. A full credit crawl follows.

== Cast ==
- Barney (voice) – Bob West
- Barney (body costume) – David Joyner
- Baby Bop (voice) – Julie Johnson
- Baby Bop (body costume) – Dao Knight
- Michael - Brian Eppes
- Amy - Becky Swonke
- Tina - Jessica Zucha
- Luci - Leah Montes
- Adam - Alexander Jhin
- Derek - Rickey Carter

== Songs ==
1. "Barney Theme Song"
2. "Everyone Is Special"
3. "The Backyard Gang Rap"
4. "We Are Barney & the Backyard Gang"
5. "Down on Grandpa's Farm"
6. "The Noble Duke of York"
7. "Pop Goes the Weasel"
8. "Alphabet Medley: English, Hebrew, and French"
9. "Where is Thumbkin?"
10. "Sally the Camel"
11. "Mr. Knickerbocker"
12. "Baby Bop's Song"
13. "Baby Bop's Street Dance"
14. "Itsy Bitsy Spider"
15. "Bubble, Bubble Bath"
16. "Hurry, Hurry, Drive the Firetruck"
17. "Down by the Station"
18. "You're a Grand Old Flag"
19. "I Love You" (Music was reused for Barney & Friends Season 1)

== Music ==
An audio cassette version of Barney in Concert was released with the home video. It was re-released a year later with a purchase of a Time-Life Video release of a Barney & Friends Season 1 episode with a credit card. There were only two versions of the cassette made.
