= Waiting for Santa =

- Original VHS cover
- Written by: Frank Olsen
- Directed by: Dwin Towell
- Starring: Jeanne Cairns; Rickey Carter; Brian Eppes; Leah Gloria; Henry Hammack; Alexander Jhin; Nome; Beckett Swonke; David Voss; Bob West; Jessica Zucha
- Music by: Bob Singleton
- Country of origin: United States
- Original language: English

Production
- Producer: Dennis DeShazer
- Editor: McKee Smith
- Running time: 35 minutes
- Production company: The Lyons Group

Original release
- Release: April 30, 1990

Waiting for Santa, known as Barney's Happy Christmas in Australia, is a direct-to-video Christmas Eve special. Released on video on April 30, 1990, as part of the Barney & the Backyard Gang series, it features an array of traditional Christmas songs as well as new arrangements. The video had sold almost five million copies by 1999.

== Plot ==
Everyone is asleep in Michael's house on Christmas Eve, except for him and his sister, Amy. They try to stay up to wait for Santa. They fall asleep, but are soon awakened by Barney who has gotten stuck trying to get down the chimney. Michael and Amy pull him out. After he is released, he magically brings the other kids there and then explains that Derek, a new boy in the neighborhood, is worried that Santa will not be able to see him. In addition, it is stated that he really wishes for some new friends more than anything else. Barney takes the gang to his house to get him and then they go on a magical sleigh ride to the North Pole to prove that Santa knows his new address. At the North Pole, they meet a snowman as well as go ice skating on a frozen pond. Afterwards, they meet Mrs. Claus and she proves to Derek that his new address is in Santa's computer and therefore he will be able to visit him. After some fun in Santa's workshop, they return home and Barney reads "A Visit from St. Nicholas" (also known as "Twas the Night Before Christmas") to Michael and Amy, unaware that Santa is there. They soon fall asleep. At the very end, a silhouette of Santa flies over the moon, shouting "Ho ho ho. Merry Christmas!"

== Cast ==
- David Voss as Barney (body costume)
- Bob West as Barney (voice)
- Brian Eppes as Michael
- Becky Swonke as Amy
- Jessica Zucha as Tina
- Leah Montes as Luci
- Alexander Jhin as Adam
- Rickey Carter as Derek
- Bob West as the Snowman (voice)
- Jeanne Cairns as Mrs. Claus
- Henry Hammack as Santa Claus

== Songs ==
1. "Barney Theme Song"
2. "When Santa Comes to our House"
3. "Waiting for Santa"
4. "I Love You"
5. "S-A-N-T-A"
6. "Star Light, Star Bright"
7. "Up on the Housetop"
8. "Jingle Bells"
9. "Winter's Wonderful"
10. "Skating, Skating"
11. "The Elves' Rap"
12. "Let's All Do a Little Tapping"
13. "Jolly Old St. Nicholas"
14. "We Wish You a Merry Christmas"
15. "Deck the Halls"

== Production ==
=== Casting ===
Originally, the role of Mrs. Claus was to be portrayed by Sandy Walper due to Walper's agent landing her the role. Walper was unable to partake in the production due to her granddaughter being due around that time. Walper would eventually portray Mother Goose for a brief period on Barney & Friends, the successor to Barney & the Backyard Gang. The role was eventually given to Jeanne Cairns.

=== Writing ===
The script for Waiting for Santa was written between April 12, 1989, and January 12, 1990. The draft and revisions were completed by Frank Olsen. The first draft was completed on April 12, 1989; the first revision was completed on April 18, 1989; the second revision was completed on December 4, 1989, the third revision was completed on January 2, 1990; and the fourth and final revision was completed on January 12, 1990.

=== Filming ===
Filming for Waiting for Santa occurred on weekends of February 1990 at ColorDynamics in Allen, Texas. Brian Eppes, who portrays Michael, was sick on set during the filming of this video. For the overhead shot of Barney and the children on the ice, the crew used an overhead camera and choreographed the children doing their routine. For Barney, the crew placed him on a blue screen background, placed him on his back as he did the spin, and then it was keyed in for the overall effect.

== Release ==
In the early 1990s, Waiting for Santa was listed at a suggested retail price of $14.95. Waiting for Santa was re-released by The Lyons Group on VHS on September 26, 1995, at a suggested retail price of $14.95. It was available for pre-order on September 12, 1995. The 1995 re-release was no longer produced after December 31, 1995. Waiting for Santa would be re-released again on September 16, 1997, at a suggested retail price of $14.95. The 1997 re-release, by Lyrick Studios, was available for pre-order on August 19, 1997, as part of the marketing campaign for the then-upcoming video, Barney's Night Before Christmas, Lyrick Studios revealed that this video was the best-selling video ever (selling over 5 million copies) at the time. New editions and releases of Waiting for Santa were stopped in the late 1990s, however, various releases of the video would continue to be sold in major retailers until the mid-2000s around the time that VHS tapes became obsolete.

Internationally, Waiting for Santa was released in the United Kingdom on December 5, 1994. The United Kingdom/Ireland release of Waiting for Santa spent a total of eleven weeks on the Official Video Chart for OCC. It first entered the chart on November 25, 1995, at No. 75. It peaked at No. 46 during its five weeks on the chart at that time until December 12, 1995. It returned to the chart on November 23, 1996, until December 12, 1996, for another five weeks and returned again on November 21, 1998, only staying on the chart for a week.

Waiting for Santa was also included in the Barney Gift Pack set that was released by Child Dimension in 1993.
