= Barney's Musical Castle =

2001 film by Jim Rowley

- Directed by: Jim Rowley
- Written by: Evan Viola
- Produced by: Jeff Gittle
- Starring: Bob West; Carey Stinson; Antwaun Steele; Julie Johnson; Jennifer Gibel; Jill Nelson; Patty Wirtz; Kyle Nelson; Charles Shaw; Talia Davis; Westly Farnsworth; Hayley Greenbauer; Fernando Moguel; Cecil Fulfer; Derrick Graves; Jay Benson; Dewayne Hambrick; Camille Pritchett; David Voss
- Music by: Joe Phillips
- Production company: Lyons Partnership, L.P.
- Distributed by: Lyrick Studios
- Release date: March 6, 2001
- Running time: 65 minutes
- Language: English

Barney's Musical Castle, also called Barney's Musical Castle LIVE and El Castillo Musical de Barney (Spanish), was Barney's fourth concert and his second US tour. The tour began on September 8, 1999, and the video was released in 2001. In this stage show tour, Barney, Baby Bop, BJ and kids go to the forest to visit the king. The home video was taped at the Rosemont Theater.

== Cast ==
- Barney (voice) - Bob West
- Barney (costume) - Carey Stinson and Antwaun Steele
- Baby Bop (voice) - Julie Johnson
- Baby Bop (costume) - Jennifer Gibel and Jill Nelson
- BJ (voice) - Patty Wirtz
- BJ (costume) - Kyle Nelson and Charles Shaw
- Andy - Fernando Moguel
- Penny - Hayley Greenbauer
- Jessica - Talia Davis
- Justin - Wesley Farnsworth
- King - Ray Hallmen

== Songs ==
=== Act One ===
1. Barney Is A Dinosaur (tune: Yankee Doodle)
2. Musical Castle Sing-Along Medley (Everyone is Special, If All the Raindrops and Mr. Knickerbocker)
3. Castles So High
4. What Makes A Flower So Pretty?
5. Look At Me, I'm Three!
6. You Can Count On Me
7. Here In The Forest
8. And The Green Grass Grows All Around
9. It's A Great Day
10. If You're Happy and You Know It

=== Act Two ===
1. Castles So High (reprise)
2. Wave The Flags
3. Musical Castle Nursery Rhymes Sing-Along (Little Bo-Peep, Hickory Dickory Dock, Pat-a-cake, Mary Had a Little Lamb, Jack and Jill, This Little Piggy (Rap vision))
4. Knight's Dance
5. Musical Castle Costume Parade (Noble Duke of York, A Silly Hat, and Boom Boom, Ain't it Great to Be Crazy)
6. I Put A Smile On
7. I'm The King
8. Musical Castle Celebration Medley (Tah-Rah-Rah-Boom-De-Ay, When I'm Old Enough to Join the Band, Wave the Flags(reprise))
9. It's A Great Day (reprise)
10. I Love You (tune: This Old Man)

== Production ==
=== Writing ===
The show's original vision was from writer Stephen White. The show was turned over to multiple writers in order to put the script together.

=== Announcements ===
In November 1998, Mary Ann Dudko made her appearance in Crook & Chase to talk about Barney and his 10th anniversary, but it mentioned when Mary talks about a big news about Barney's new stage show and about to touring in major cities in Fall 1999 to Spring 2001.

== Release ==
The show made its world premiere on September 15, 1999 at the Reunion Arena in Dallas, Texas. The show toured in North America until 2001 and was nationally sponsored by Luvs. The show was announced to play in eighty cities over the course of the original run. During the show's original run, it drew more than nine hundred ten thousand attendees to two hundred forty-three performances and saw $17.5 million in ticket grosses. Following North America, the show toured in Mexico in 2000 in its initial run, it was later performed in Asia in 2005 and 2012, Mexico, Central America and Latin America from 2006 to 2007, and the Middle East from 2009 to 2010. A portion of the proceeds from the tour benefited the National Children’s Alliance, a nonprofit organization dedicated to eliminating child abuse.

== See also ==
- List of Barney & Friends episodes and videos
