= Barney's Good Day Good Night =

1997 film

- Directed by: Fred Holmes
- Written by: Mark S. Bernthal
- Produced by: Ben Vaughn
- Starring: Bob West; David Joyner; Monet Chandler; Chase Gallatin; Sara Hickman; Angel Velasco
- Edited by: Bryan S. Norfolk; McKee Smith
- Music by: Bob Singleton
- Production companies: Lyons Partnership, L.P.
- Distributed by: Lyrick Studios
- Release date: November 4, 1997
- Running time: 42 minutes
- Country: United States
- Language: English

Barney's Good Day Good Night is a 1997 American direct-to-video live-action musical film based on the Barney & Friends television series. It was released to VHS on November 4, 1997. It features an array of traditional children's songs and original songs.

== Plot ==
Kristen, Stephen, Robert, and Ashley enter their school's playground and find a butterfly near the school's Barney doll, inspiring them to make butterflies with their hands ("Four Little Butterflies"). Barney emerges from the doll as the kids play shadow tag, and initially mistake his shadow for Ashley's. Barney and the kids praise the sun ("Mr. Sun"), then to protect their eyes from the sun, they use the Barney Bag to make visors from paper plates. Barney and the kids listen to the sounds of a beautiful day, and after they see a bee fly across some flowers, Barney places the kids in flower costumes ("What Makes a Flower So Pretty?"). The kids ask Barney to recognize what type of flower they are as he compliments them, before they are taken out of the costumes ("Growing").

Robert tells Barney that he has always wanted to stay up all night long just too see what happens at nighttime. At the school, Barney has the kids get ready for bed by taking a bath, putting on their pajamas and brushing their teeth ("Getting Ready for Bed"). The kids are told a bedtime story in which Barney and three sandman help a girl find one more thing she wants before going to sleep ("Just One More Thing"). Barney then sings a lullaby to make the kids fall asleep, but it still fails, so he brings out his Night-Timer to turn the day into nighttime. Barney teaches the kids some unusual sights and sounds associated with nighttime. After singing some of their favorite nighttime songs, the stars begin to fade and before they know it, the sun is shining once again. Back in reality, Barney and the kids sing "I Love You", and the kids leave afterward.

== Cast ==
- Barney (voice) – Bob West
- Barney (costume) – David Joyner
- Ashley – Monet Chandler
- Stephen – Chase Gallatin
- Kristen – Sara Hickman
- Robert – Angel Velasco
- Puppeteer – Ray Henry

== Critical reception ==
On The New York Times' Guide to the Best Children's Videos the video was praised for its production and songs.

== Songs ==
1. "Barney Theme Song"
2. "Four Little Butterflies"
3. "Mister Sun"
4. "The Barney Bag"
5. "What Makes a Flower So Pretty?"
6. "Growing"
7. "Getting Ready for Bed"
8. "Just One More Thing"
9. "Brahms' Lullaby"
10. "Listen to the Night Time"
11. "Are You Sleeping?" (English version of "Frère Jacques")
12. "Aiken Drum"
13. "Twinkle Twinkle Little Star"
14. "Mister Sun" (Reprise)
15. "I Love You"
