= The Little Tigers =

The Little Tigers or Little Tiger may refer to:

- Asian Tigers (economics), the subset of Singapore and Hong Kong
- The Little Tigers (comic), an American comic strip by Jimmy Swinnerton, which followed The Little Bears and later grew into Mr. Jack
- Xiao Hu Dui, a Taiwanese idol band which was formed in 1988 and disbanded in 1995
- Jimmy Barry, an American boxer also known as "The Little Tiger"
- Little Tiger Press, a publisher in the UK acquired by Penguin Random House
- "Little Tiger", a 2009 song by Tune-Yards, from the album Bird-Brains

== See also ==
- Two little tigers, a nursery rhyme
- Little tiger blue (Tarucus balkanicus), a butterfly
- Tiger (disambiguation)
