= Barney Live in New York City =

1994 film

- Directed by: Bruce Deck
- Written by: Stephen White
- Produced by: Martha Datema Lipscomb
- Music by: Phil Parker
- Production company: Lyons Partnership, L.P.
- Distributed by: Lyrick Studios
- Release date: August 26, 1994
- Running time: 75 minutes
- Language: English

Barney Live In New York City (originally titled Barney Live! At Radio City, also known as Barney & Friends: Live in New York City) is a Barney & Friends stage show, taped at Radio City Music Hall in New York City on March 6, 1994 and released on video on August 26, 1994. It was also the largest Barney & Friends stage show.

== Plot ==
Barney and his friends take the stage to delight and entertain everyone at Radio City Music Hall. They all work together to make a special surprise for the audience using items from "The Barney Bag". But before they are able to share it, a new visitor, The Winkster, steals the bag and runs away with it. Throughout the show, the gang tries to catch The Winkster and teach him that it is important to have friends and to share. Also, the chase takes everyone to "Barney's Imagination Circus" with fun-loving clowns and some dancing bears.

== Cast ==
- Barney (voice) - Bob West
- Barney (costume) - David Joyner/Carey Stinson
- Baby Bop (voice) - Julie Johnson
- Baby Bop (costume) - Jeff Ayers
- B.J. (voice) - Patty Wirtz
- B.J. (costume) - Jeff Brooks
- The Winkster - David Voss/Ashley Wood
- Barney understudy - Alan Bruce
- B.J. and Baby Bop understudy - Carol Farabee
- Shawn - John David Bennett, II
- Derek - Rickey Carter
- Tosha - Hope Cervantes
- Kathy - Lauren King
- Carlos - Corey Lopez
- Min - Pia Manalo
- Julie - Susannah Wetzel
- Kelly - Rebecca Wilson
- Dancers
  - Barbara Angeline
  - Joe Bowerman
  - Tina Bush
  - Garland Days
  - David DeCooman
  - Vivien Eng
  - Raymond Harris
  - Steven Petrillo
  - Carolyn Ockert
  - Michelle Robinson
  - Amy Shure
  - Kristin Willits
  - Dana Zell
- Guest - Morgan Jordan
- Narrator - Charles Edward Hall

== Songs ==
=== Act One ===
1. Barney Theme Song (Tune: Yankee Doodle)
2. The More We Get Together
3. Mr. Knickerbocker
4. Ring Around the Rosie
5. My Yellow Blankey
6. The Barney Bag
7. The Winkster
8. She'll Be Coming Around the Mountain
9. B.J.'s Song
10. Take Me Out to the Ball Game
11. Rain Medley (Rain Rain Go Away and It's Raining, It's Pouring)
12. If all the Raindrops
13. And the Green Grass Grows All Around
14. I Am a Fine Musician

=== Act Two ===
1. Boom, Boom, Ain't It Great to Be Crazy?
2. The Wheels On the Bus
3. Three Monkeys Rap
4. Do Your Ears Hang Low?
5. The Airplane Song
6. Me & My Teddy
7. Four Little Ducks
8. My Aunt Came Back
9. London Bridge Is Falling Down
10. "Star" Medley (Twinkle, Twinkle, Little Star and Star Light, Star Bright)
11. Please & Thank You
12. Everyone Is Special

== Production ==
A concert taking place at Radio City Music Hall in New York City, New York based on the children's television series Barney & Friends was first announced in November 1993 with scheduled performances to be from March 5-13, 1994.

=== Writing ===
Creators of Barney & Friends, Sheryl Leach, Kathy Parker and Dennis DeShazer, planned to write the show themselves, however, given the little time to spare, they assigned Stephen White to write the show from scratch. To prep for the show, White was flown out to New York and watched the Christmas Spectacular Starring the Radio City Rockettes. Afterwards, he returned to Texas and immediately went to the library seeking out books on how to stage a school play, given that he knew nothing about writing live performances. White drew out initial designs for the stage layout on his dining room table and assembled them from a poster board using his young daughter's fruit-scented markers. Victor DiNapoli, a set designer and builder who had worked on Sesame Street, looked at the designs and reluctantly approved them, citing that nothing else could be changed given the short amount of time. The show was written about a month before it officially premiered.

=== Rehearsal ===
A full dress rehearsal never occurred for the production. When the show first premiered however, the show went smoothly. Originally, there was going to be a Barney doll appearing at the beginning of the live show. However, during rehearsals, both the Barney doll and the Barney costume ended up being onstage at the same time, thus scrapping the idea.

== Music ==
The song "I Love You" wasn't sung in order to give the show a distinct identity. A lawsuit involving the song at the time discouraged them from using it in the live show. The song was replaced with "Everyone is Special".

== Release ==
=== Tickets ===
In December 1993, before tickets officially went on sale, tickets to the performances were sold. Hundreds of people tried to purchase tickets directly from the box-office but were turned away at 10:50 a.m., about an hour and a half after sales opened. The Lyons Group, owners of the Barney franchise at the time, had no control over the sales. It was later discovered that the $30 tickets to the show was being sold for as high as $200 through ticket scalpers. Prior to the ticket scalpers, a few tickets were offered to Barney Fan Club Members in advance. Through Radio City Music Hall and The Lyons Group, additional tickets went on sale to the public for the performances of March 9-13, through a random mail order drawing. Tickets for those performances were initially blocked off due to concern with obstructing the stage view with the cameras for filming.

On opening night, the show became the second fastest sell-out in Radio City history, coming behind Bette Midler's show at Radio City Music Hall that performed a year prior. One performance sold out in twenty-one minutes. In total, twelve shows were sold out in less than two hours. For the performance on March 8, the show was in benefit to five charities, which included the National Network of Children's Advocacy Centers, Camp WIN, Nordoff-Robbins Music Therap Foundation, LIFEbeat and NARAS Foundation. In addition, thousands of children from charitable organizations in the New York area attended the benefit concert for free, courtesy of The Lyons Group.

=== Performances ===
According to Stephen White, he had cast Corey Lopez (Carlos) and Rebecca Wilson (Kelly) as understudies in case any of the main child actors were unavailable to perform, hence why they were both given minor roles in the show. According to a Variety review, Min was absent from the March 6th performance. Rebecca Wilson, who portrayed Kelly, read for Min's lines during her absence as she was the understudy.

According to Bob West, in one performance, he once forgot to introduce Hope Cervantes (Tosha) for when Barney brings out the kids from behind the curtains by name.

In the filmed performance, Tosha had her hair up in a bun in some shots, but in other shots, she also had her hair up in a ponytail with curly strands.

Alan Bruce served as Barney's understudy for this live show, when Bob West was unable to voice him but he never had to fill in. Carol Farabee was the understudy for BJ and Baby Bop if at any point Julie Johnson and or Patty Wirtz was unable to fill in.

=== Broadcast television ===
Highlights of the show were broadcast on PBS during a pledge drive in August 1994 as Showstoppers from...Barney Live! in New York City. It later aired on PBS in 1995, being the second Barney Home Video to be televised. When this video was aired during the PBS Pledge drives in 1995, the "Barney Theme Song", "The More We Get To Together", "Mr. Knickerbocker", "Rain Medley", "If All the Raindrops", "And the Green Grass Grows All Around", "Me and My Teddy" weren't sung. This is also the one and rarest times that the "Barney Theme Song" wasn't sung/edited out during the pledge drives.

=== Home media ===
The circus scenes were included as a bonus feature on the DVD release of Barney's Super Singing Circus. On May 21, 2022, the official Barney YouTube channel, managed by 9 Story Media Group at the time, uploaded the show on the platform, with the video uploaded by the channel coming from a Barney fan upload on the site.
