= Two Tigers (nursery rhyme) =

Chinese nursery rhyme

A book and CD set entitled Children's Songs: Two Little Tigers 兩隻老虎歡樂歌謠

Two Tigers (or Little Tigers) is a popular traditional Mandarin nursery rhyme called "Liang Zhi Lao Hu" in Mandarin. Variations adopt the tune of the French melody "Frère Jacques", "Where is Thumbkin", or the third movement of Mahler's "Symphony No. 1"

The tune depicts two high-spirited baby tigers, tussling to the point that they have bitten off select body parts. It is particularly popular amongst parents of toddlers born in the Year of the Tiger.

== Lyrics ==
=== Traditional Chinese lyrics ===
ㄌㄧㄤˇ	ㄓ	ㄌㄠˇ	ㄏㄨˇ
兩	隻	老	虎	,

ㄌㄧㄤˇ	ㄓ	ㄌㄠˇ	ㄏㄨˇ
兩	隻	老	虎	,

ㄆㄠˇ	ㄉㄜˊ	ㄎㄨㄞˋ
跑	得	快	,

ㄆㄠˇ	ㄉㄜˊ	ㄎㄨㄞˋ
跑	得	快	!

ㄧˋ	ㄓ	ㄇㄟˊ	ㄧㄡˇ	ㄦˇ	ㄉㄨㄛ			ㄧˋ	ㄓ	ㄇㄟˊ	ㄧㄡˇ	ㄧㄢˇ	ㄐㄧㄥ
一	隻	沒	有	耳	朵	!	(or	一	隻	沒	有	眼	睛	!	)

ㄧˋ	ㄓ	ㄇㄟˊ	ㄧㄡˇ	ㄧˇ	ㄅㄚ
一	隻	沒	有	尾	巴	!

ㄓㄣˉ	ㄑㄧˊ	ㄍㄨㄞˋ
真	奇	怪	!

ㄓㄣ	ㄑㄧˊ	ㄍㄨㄞˋ
真	奇	怪	!

ㄕㄡˇ	ㄗㄞˋ	ㄋㄚˇ	ㄌㄧˇ
手	在	哪	裡	,

ㄕㄡˇ	ㄗㄞˋ	ㄋㄚˇ	ㄌㄧˇ
手	在	哪	裡	?

ㄗㄞˋ	ㄓㄜˋ	ㄌㄧˇ
在	這	裡	!

ㄗㄞˋ	ㄓㄜˋ	ㄌㄧˇ
在	這	裡	!

ㄋㄧˇ	ㄐㄧㄣ	ㄊㄧㄢ	ㄏㄠˇ	ㄇㄚ˙
你	今	天	好	嗎	?

ㄨㄛˇ	ㄐㄧㄣ	ㄊㄧㄢ	ㄏㄣˇ	ㄏㄠˇ
我	今	天	很	好

ㄗㄞˋ	ㄗㄧㄢˋ	ㄅㄚ˙
再	見	吧	!

ㄗㄞˋ	ㄗㄧㄢˋ	ㄅㄚ˙
再	見	吧	!

=== Simplified Chinese lyrics ===
Liǎng	zhī	lǎo	hǔ
两	只	老	虎	,

Liǎng	zhī	lǎo	hǔ
两	只	老	虎	,

Pǎo	de	kuài
跑	得	快	,

Pǎo	de	kuài
跑	得	快	!

Yī	zhī	méi	yǒu	ěr	duo			Yī	zhī	méi	yǒu	yǎn	jing
一	只	沒	有	耳	朵	!	(or	一	只	沒	有	眼	睛	!	)

Yī	zhī	méi	yǒu	yǐ	ba
一	只	沒	有	尾	巴	!

Zhēn	qí	guài
真	奇	怪	!

Zhēn	qí	guài
真	奇	怪	!

Shǒu	zài	nǎ	lǐ
手	在	哪	里	?

Shǒu	zài	nǎ	lǐ
手	在	哪	里	?

Zài	zhè	lǐ
在	这	里	!

Zài	zhè	lǐ
在	这	里	!

Nǐ	jīn	tiān	hǎo	ma
你	今	天	好	吗	?

Wǒ	jīn	tiān	hěn	hǎo
我	今	天	很	好

Zài	jiàn	ba
再	见	吧	!

Zài	jiàn	ba
再	见	吧	!

=== Translated English lyrics ===
Two small tigers,
Two small tigers,
Run so fast,
Run so fast!
One does not have ears! (or: One does not have eyes!)
One doesn't have a tail!
That's so strange,
That's so strange!

Where's your hand?
Where's your hand?
Over here!
Over here!
How are you today?
I'm very good today!
Goodbye!
Goodbye!

=== Alternate English lyrics ===
Little tigers,
Little tigers,
Run so fast,
Run so fast!
Tell me where you're going,
Tell me where you're going!
Let me know,
Let me know!

Where's your hand?
Where's your hand?
Over here!
Over here!
How are you today, dear?
Very well, I thank you!
Goodbye! Cheers!
Goodbye! Cheers!
