= Steve Gomer =

American film and television director

- Occupation(s): Film director, television director
- Years active: 1987–present

Steve Gomer is an American film and television director.

He made his directorial debut with Sweet Lorraine (1987), starring Maureen Stapleton. Gomer went on to direct Fly By Night (1993), Sunset Park (1996, starring Rhea Perlman) and Barney's Great Adventure (1998), based on the Barney & Friends television series.

Gomer shifted into television directing in 2000 with the "Hanlon's Choice" episode of Chicago Hope. He has since directed for Gilmore Girls, Ally McBeal, Joan of Arcadia, The Unit, Private Practice and several other television programs.

After a hiatus of six years, Gomer returned to film directing with All Saints (2017), based on the true story of preacher Michael Spurlock and the All Saints Church. All Saints proved to be his most critically and commercially successful film, earning a 95% approval rating on Rotten Tomatoes and a worldwide box office gross of $5.9 million on a budget of $2 million.
