= Where is Thumbkin? =

Children's song and fingerplay

- Song
- Genre: Children's song
- Language: English
- Composed: Jean-Philippe Rameau*
- Published: France

"Where is Thumbkin?" is an English-language nursery rhyme, action song, and children's song of American origin. The song is sung to the tune of "Frère Jacques". The song and actions have long been used in children's play, and in teaching in nursery, pre-school and kindergarten settings, as it uses simple and repetitive phrases, and tactile, visual and aural signals.

== Lyrics ==
The song's most common lyrics are:

Where is Thumbkin?
Where is Thumbkin?
Here I am!
Here I am!
How are you today, sir?
Very well, I thank you!
Run away!
Run away!

Where is Pointer?
Where is Pointer?
Here I am!
Here I am!
How are you today, sir?
Very well, I thank you!
Run away!
Run away!

Where is Tallman?
Where is Tallman?
Here I am!
Here I am!
How are you today, sir?
Very well, I thank you!
Run away!
Run away!

Where is Ringman?
Where is Ringman?
Here I am!
Here I am!
How are you today, sir?
Very well, I thank you!
Run away!
Run away!

Where is Pinky?
Where is Pinky?
Here I am!
Here I am!
How are you today, sir?
Very well, I thank you!
Run away!
Run away!

Where is the family?
Where is the family?
Here we are!
Here we are!
How are you today, sirs?
Very well, we thank you!
Run away!
Run away!

== Actions ==
One action is performed for each line of the song.

- Child holds hands behind back and sings two lines
- Brings one hand to front and sings
- Brings other hand to front and sings
- Wiggles first thumb and sings
- Wiggles second thumb and sings
- Moves first hand back behind back and sings
- Moves second hand back behind back and sings

== See also ==
- Children's song
