= Brian Eppes =

American attorney

- Born: Brian Sidney Eppes; September 14, 1979 (age 46); Vancouver, Washington, U.S.
- Education: Texas A&M University; South Texas College of Law Houston
- Occupations: Attorney; actor
- Spouse: Meagan Elizabeth Hagli (m. 2003)
- Children: 2

Brian Sidney Eppes (born September 14, 1979) is an American attorney and former child actor. He is best-known for portraying Michael in the first two seasons on the live-action children's show Barney & Friends, and the preceding Barney & the Backyard Gang.

== Career ==
=== Early career ===
Eppes has done numerous of national radio and television commercials, printed ads and theater experience including in plays such as A Christmas Story and The Nerd.

=== Barney ===
==== Barney & The Backyard Gang ====
Eppes was notified by his agent that a local children's show was holding auditions for a few videos, which eventually became Barney & the Backyard Gang. He eventually booked the role of Michael and worked on the series when he was at the age of eight. Eppes, who lived in Arlington, Texas at the time, lived an hour and a half from where the show was filmed (which was in Allen, Texas). His father would drop him to set in the morning and his mother would pick him up at 5:30 PM. It got to the point at times where Eppes would stay from one to two nights a week with Sheryl Leach, the creator of the series. After the first trilogy of episodes for the series, Eppes would go back to his normal life such as attending school; however, he did sacrifice a few baseball practices when filming.

==== Barney & Friends ====
When Barney & Friends went into production, Eppes began to do the show full-time, unlike the earlier series. Eppes continued to portray Michael until Season 2 when he was at the age of thirteen. Eppes returned to portray Michael in the 1999 video Sing & Dance with Barney.

=== Later career ===
In 1991, Eppes portrayed various roles on the Christian-themed children's television series Gerbert.

After Barney & Friends, Eppes decided not to continue with acting so he could concentrate on academics and sports. Eppes attended a mini-reunion on the Barney & Friends set at Las Colinas in Irving, Texas with a few cast members from the first three seasons.

He currently works as an attorney at Gebhardt and Eppes, PLLC, a boutique law firm in downtown Fort Worth, Texas.

== Personal life ==
When Eppes married Meagan Elizabeth Hagli in 2003, Barney made a video for him, which was played at the rehearsal dinner.
