= Joe Scruggs =

American musician

- Born: June 21, 1951 (age 75); El Paso, Texas, United States
- Occupations: Musician, singer-songwriter
- Writing career
- Period: 1979-2012
- Genres: Children's music, Folk music

Joe Scruggs (born June 21, 1951) is an American singer-songwriter widely acclaimed for his children's and folk music output. He was also a major personality as a children's entertainer, touring schools across America and making television appearances on shows like Barney & Friends.

== Background ==
Joe Scruggs grew up in El Paso, Texas, making his first performances as a member of youth choirs in the Methodist Church. As a child of the 1960s, he sang in a group that performed folk songs that would influence his future compositions.

Scruggs attended the University of Texas at El Paso. He later received an MA from Texas Tech University.

By the 1980s, he had married and brought his brand of folk music to the kindergarten classroom, where his wife taught. His songs received the acclaim of teachers and students alike.

After performing in shows in the early 2010s and around San Antonio, and at Manchester College, he celebrated the 25th anniversary of the Children of Woodlands.

== Career ==
=== 1980s ===
Scruggs released his debut studio album, Late Last Night, in 1984. It featured "catchy lyrics and professional arrangements", catching the attention of the Children's Radio Network. He built upon his musical canon by releasing his next four albums in the four years following. This output netted him many awards, and got him featured on Today and The David Letterman Show. The decade ended with the release of a Christmas album.

=== 1990s ===
Bahamas Pajamas released in 1990, followed by the LP that would be his last, Ants. However, Scruggs continued to perform for children nationwide and was featured in the PBS' Barney & Friends episode "The Exercise Circus!" in 1993. In the gap between Bahamas Pajamas and Ants, Scruggs released two live concert videos to heavy praise.

=== 2000s ===
Scruggs partnered up with his high school friend, Pete Markham, to tour the country performing his show called the Nanny Nanny Boo Boo Revue. The creative force of Scruggs's career culminated in a musical theater piece called Not Afraid of the Dark, for which Scruggs wrote the songs. His music was arranged by Gary Powell, and together with Stephen Mills and the Ballet Austin organization Joe's fun and magical music was put to the stage.

== Personal life ==
Scruggs has retired from the children's entertainment business. He currently lives with his wife and two children near Austin, Texas. On October 28, 2022, Scruggs made his return to children's entertainment with a remake of his song "Belly Button", which he renamed "Belly Button Hoo Doo." This marks Scruggs' first release since 1994.

== Awards and recognition ==
- Parents' Choice Honor Recording (1986), Abracadabra
- Parents' Choice Gold Award (1987) Deep in the Jungle
- 1st Place, U.S.A. Film Festival (1991) Skateboard
- California Children's Video Award (1991)
- Oppenheimer Gold Seal Award (1987, 1991) Deep in the Jungle, Bahamas Pajamas
- Parents' Choice Gold Award (1991) Bahamas Pajamas
- Notable Children's Video Award (1993)
- American Library Association Notable Award (1994)
- Cable Ace Award (1996)
- BMI TV Music Award (1997)

== Works ==
=== Discography ===
==== Albums ====
- Late Last Night (1984)
- Traffic Jams (1985)
- Abracadabra (1986)
- Deep in the Jungle (1987)
- Even Trolls Have Moms (1988)
- Merry Christmas (1989)
- Bahamas Pajamas (1990)
- Ants (1994)

==== Singles ====
===== Late Last Night (1984) =====
- "Late Last Night"
- "Wiggle in My Toe"
- "Ants in My Pants"
- "Belly Button"
- "What Do They Do With the Children?"

===== Traffic Jams (1985) =====
- "Goo Goo Ga Ga"
- "In the Freezer"
- "Under Your Bed"
- "This Little Piggy"

===== Deep in the Jungle (1987) =====
- "Deep in the Jungle"
- "By the Way"
- "Skateboard"
- "Green Peas"
- "Rock-n-Roll MacDonald"
- "Put Your Thumb in the Air"

===== Even Trolls Have Moms (1988) =====
- "Even Trolls Have Moms"
- "Swing Low, Saint Mountain"
- "Talking Toybox"

===== Bahamas Pajamas (1990) =====
- "Bahamas Pajamas"
- "Busy Box Band"
- "Swing Low, Saint Mountain"
- "On Halloween Night"
- "Gingerbread Man"

===== Ants (1994) =====
- "Big Underwear"

=== Filmography ===
- Joe's First Video (1989)
- Joe Scruggs in Concert (1992)

=== Musical theatre ===
- Not Afraid of the Dark (2012)
