= David Joyner (actor) =

American actor

- Born: Decatur, Illinois, U.S.
- Occupations: Actor therapist
- Years active: 1991–present

Signature
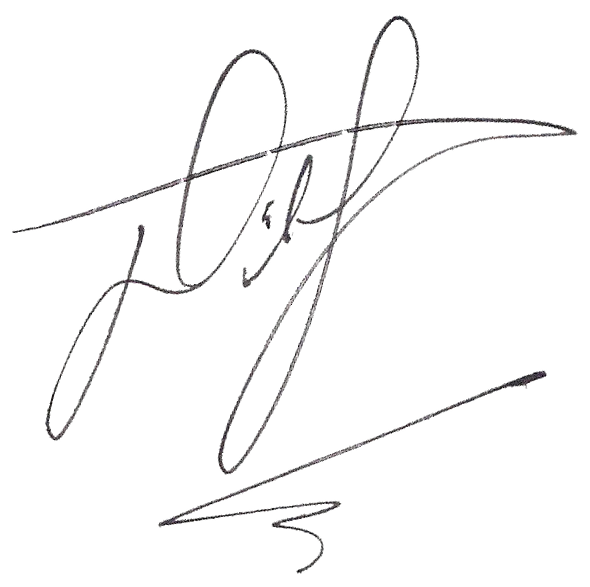

David Joyner is an American actor and massage therapist. He is best known for physically portraying Barney from 1991 to 2001 on the children's television series Barney & Friends and its predecessor Barney & the Backyard Gang. Bob West, Duncan Brannan, and Tim Dever voiced the character. Later on, Joyner played the title character of Hip Hop Harry.

== Early life ==
Joyner attended MacArthur High School and graduated with a Bachelor of Science degree in Electronic engineering technology from the ITT Technical Institute in Indianapolis, Indiana. He worked as a software analyst for Texas Instruments for six years.

== Career ==
Joyner once stated that he had a dream the night before he auditioned to play the role of Barney. In the dream, Barney passed out and Joyner had to give him mouth to mouth resuscitation. And on the day of the audition, Joyner stopped at a red light and noticed a billboard above him for Southwest Airlines. It said "breathe life into your vacation." Joyner decided that "if I could breathe life into this character, I was going on vacation."

Joyner originally auditioned for the role in 1991, replacing Barney's original costume actor, David Voss. Joyner was originally cast as the back-up performer, but took over the role after the actress originally chosen had difficulty staying in the costume for long periods of time.

Joyner was originally cast to play Barney in two Barney & the Backyard Gang home videos, but continued to play Barney in the TV series Barney & Friends during the first six seasons, as well as in live performances. After the fourth season episode "Let's Eat", he left to film Barney's Great Adventure and was replaced with Josh Martin and Maurice Scott for the rest of the season. Joyner returned to perform Barney in Barney in Outer Space in 1997. After he left the series, he also continued to play him for occasional appearances until 2005 with a brief return in 2008.

At that time, he was replaced with Carey Stinson, who had also performed the character for birthday parties in 1991 and public appearances starting in 1992. He also started to perform him in stage shows such as Barney Live in New York City in 1994.

Outside of acting, Joyner also works as a tantric massage therapist.

== Filmography ==
=== Film ===
Year	Title	Role	Notes
1993	Barney's Magical Musical Adventure	Barney (in-suit performer)	Direct-to-video
1998	Barney in Outer Space	Barney (in-suit performer)	Direct-to-video
1998	Barney's Great Adventure	Barney (in-suit performer)	
2006	I'll Be there with You	Sheriff	
2007	All Lies on Me	Tin Man	
2009	The Adventures of Umbweki	Village Leaper	
2010	Kontrolled	Mr. Peterson	

=== Television ===
Year	Title	Role	Notes
1991	Barney & the Backyard Gang	Barney (in-suit performer)	2 episodes
1992–2001	Barney & Friends	Barney (in-suit performer)	104 episodes
2001	General Hospital	Garland	2 episodes
2002	The Wayne Brady Show	Barney (in-suit performer)	1 episode
2002–2003	Today	Barney (in-suit performer)	2 episodes
2003	What Should You Do?	Steven Johnson	Episode: "New York Bar Hostage Situation"
2004	That's So Raven	The Teddy Bear	Episode: "Four's a Crowd"
2004	Crossing Jordan	CSU Tech	Uncredited; Episode: "Is That Plutonium in Your Pocket, or Are You Just Happy to See Me?"
2004–2006	ER	Dialysis Tech	3 episodes
2005	House	Cardiac Surgeon #2	Episode: "Control"
2005	That '70s Show	Jazz Musician	Episode: "Long Away"
2005	The Inside	Good Samaritan	Episode: "Aidan"
2006	24	Agent Jones	Episode: "Day 5: 10:00 a.m.-11:00 a.m."
2006–2008	Hip Hop Harry	Hip Hop Harry (In-suit performer), Chef Rob	26 episodes Also producer
2007	Identity	Himself	1 episode
2007	American's Next Producer	Shelby	Episode: "Late Night with Carson Daly"
2008	The Young and the Restless	Keith Joyner	6 episodes
2009	The Closer	Uni #1	Episode: "Strike Three"
2010	Scooby-Doo! Curse of the Lake Monster	Sinister Clown	Television film
2012	My Choice	God	Episode: "Pilot"
2013	Southland	Detective Flynn	Episode: "Off Duty"
2013	Wendell and Vinnie	Ernesto	Episode: "Fathers of Fathers & Sons"
2013	Don't Trust the B— in Apartment 23	Business Man #2	Episode: "Monday June..."
2013	Switched at Birth	Gavin	Episode: "Mother and Child Divided"
2014	Hart of Dixie	Supervisor Greene	Episode: "Back in the Saddle Again"
2014	According to Him + Her	Reenactment	13 episodes
2015	Nicky, Ricky, Dicky & Dawn	Police Officer	Episode: "Family Matters"
2015	Cry Wolfe	Carl	Episode: "Hot for Teacher"
2015	Murder in the First	Reporter #2	Episode: "Oh, Mexico"
2016	Shameless	Tod	Episode: "The F Word"
2016	Hip Hop Harry: Mini Episodes	Hip Hop Harry (in-suit performer)	
2016	Angel from Hell	Security Clerk	Episode: "Funsgiving"
2016	Veep	Congress Clerk	Episode: "Kissing Your Sister
2018	Just Add Magic	Victor	Episode: "Just Add Fluffy"
2018	Animal Kingdom	Nelson 'Pilot'	Episode: "Incoming"
2019	S.W.A.T.	Leon	Episode: "Track"
2019	Unknown Encounter	Joshua	Television film
2022	I Love You, You Hate Me	Himself	Adult docuseries

=== Web ===
Year	Title	Role	Notes
2017	Hip Hop Harry Toy Review	Hip Hop Harry (in-suit performer)	
2019	ABC Harry	Hip Hop Harry (in-suit performer)	Recurring role

=== Theater ===
Year	Title	Role
1994	Barney Live in New York City	Barney (in-suit performer)
