= Lyrick Studios =

Defunct American production company

Lyrick Studios Inc.
- Final logo, used from 1996 to 2001
- Type: Private
- Predecessor: The Lyons Group
- Founded: 1994; 32 years ago
- Defunct: June 6, 2001; 25 years ago
- Fate: Acquired and folded into HIT Entertainment
- Successors: HIT Entertainment
- Headquarters: Allen, Texas, U.S.
- Key people: Richard C. Leach (Owner); Timothy A. Clott (CEO); Robert Lawes (CEO, 2001); Steve Ruffini (CFO); Joyce D. Slocum (SVP Legal/Business); Debbie Ries (Sales VP); Sloan Coleman (SR VP Live Events)
- Products: Children's television shows, home videos, audio products, books, and toys
- Production output: Barney & Friends; Wishbone
- Owner: Lyrick Corporation (1994-2001)
- Number of employees: 650 (1997)
- Divisions: Lyrick Publishing; Lyrick Studios - Music Division
- Subsidiaries: Big Feats! Entertainment

Lyrick Studios was an American video production and distribution company based in Allen, Texas, best known for their flagship property Barney & Friends.

The company was known for producing and distributing television shows, home videos, audio products and children's books and toys. On February 9, 2001, the company was acquired by British entertainment company HIT Entertainment. HIT later folded the studio in June of that year following the completion of the acquisition.

== History ==
=== 1988-1994: Beginnings and formation ===
The company's origins traces back to when Barney & Friends became a huge success. The show was owned and produced by The Lyons Group, a company that was created by Richard C. Leach, who previously produced its predecessor, Barney & the Backyard Gang. Both series were created by his daughter-in-law, Sheryl Leach. In 1994, Leach had begun production on a new series titled Wishbone, which was produced by Big Feats! Entertainment. Because of the emerging video business, it led to the creation of Lyrick Studios, which was formed under its parent company Lyrick Corporation. Leach's vision for Lyrick Studios was to expand the offerings of quality children's entertainment products. Both The Lyons Group and Big Feats! Entertainment became subsidiaries of the new company.

=== 1995-2000: Acquisitions and expansion ===
In the late 1990s, Lyrick turned its primary focus on distribution of children's TV shows and films. They acquired the distribution rights for VeggieTales and The Wiggles, and also acquired the book publishing rights for some Humongous Entertainment video game characters, such as Putt-Putt, Freddi Fish and Pajama Sam.

In 1999, Lyrick planned to expand their existing headquarters to add 400,000 square feet. The first phase of the campus was expected to cost $6 million, which consisted of a two-story 60,000-square-foot building. The goal of the building expansion was to unite the company's operations in one spot.

=== 2001: HIT Entertainment acquisition ===
Leach, who was now in his seventies, was ready to slow down and wanted to resolve ownership of Lyrick, although none of his children wanted to run the company. In 2001, the company was acquired and folded into HIT Entertainment for $275 million, with eventual Lyrick CEO, Robert Lawes, being the driving force of the acquisition. Leach decided that HIT Entertainment was a good fit for Lyrick as he believed the two companies shared the same values about creating quality programs for the preschool market. The deal included that 'Lyrick Studios' was to be retained as a consumer brand for existing Lyrick properties, however, the Lyrick Studios name disappeared a few months after, as Lyrick merged into HIT Entertainment. Richard C. Leach was to be appointed a non-executive director of HIT on completion. However, he died of a heart attack on May 29, 2001 at the Dallas-Fort Worth Airport.

On June 6, 2001, it was announced that Lyrick and HIT were to operate as one company as reorganization of management occurred. Rob Lawes, who was the newly appointed Chief Executive of Lyrick Corporation and CEO of Lyrick Studios for four months, became chief executive of HIT Entertainment while Steve Ruffini, who was the CFO of Lyrick Studios, became the CFO of HIT. Although the merger was complete, the Lyrick Studios logo wouldn't be phased out until the end of August of that year.

=== Aftermath ===
Due to the HIT acquisition of Lyrick and the death of Lyrick founder Richard C. Leach, it made Big Idea, owners of VeggieTales, wary of giving the distribution rights to a company that, as its founder Phil Vischer stated, "was no longer interested in working with properties they didn't own." In December 2001, Big Idea announced that they would be switching their general market distribution to Warner Home Video. The following month, HIT sued Big Idea for breach of contract and the case went to trial in April 2003. HIT argued that their draft agreement with Big Idea was binding, while Big Idea argued that the terms were still under negotiation and they never formally signed a contract. The court agreed with HIT, awarding HIT Entertainment $11 million in punitive damages, but the verdict was overturned on appeal two years later, and the Big Idea appeal was affirmed at the Supreme Court when they declined to take the case.

== Divisions ==
=== Lyrick Publishing ===
Lyrick Publishing was the publishing arm of Lyrick Studios. They had a publishing division called Big Red Chair. Employing about 80 individuals, the company shut down in 2001 due to the acquisition with HIT Entertainment as the division had been losing money. Books published by the division were transferred to HIT Entertainment and Scholastic, Inc.

== Distribution ==
=== Programs ===
Name	First release date	Final release date	Notes
Barney & Friends	April 6, 1992	August 28, 2001 (Note: The date that the snap clamshell VHS release of Barney: Let's Go to the Zoo was released was dedicated to Lyrick Studios, which folded into HIT Entertainment.)	Flagship franchise
Wishbone	October 8, 1995	March 13, 1998	Big Feats! Entertainment; Releases from 1995 to 1996 were originally distributed by PolyGram Video.
The Faithful Revolution: Vatican II	1996		Sole non-children's video release by Lyrick Studios
Francesco's Friendly World	1996	February 25, 1998	
Joe Scruggs	March 11, 1997		
VeggieTales	March 31, 1998	June 6, 2001	Mass-market distribution (Note: Originally distributed in Christian bookstores.)
Tall Tales & Legends	June 16, 1998	October 10, 1998	
Groundling Marsh	June 23, 1998	September 8, 1998	
The Wiggles	October 12, 1999 (music); August 1, 2000 (video) (Note: The #1 preschool band collaborated Barney the purple dinosaur's national stage show tour "Barney's Musical Castle" in America and Canada from Spring 2000 to Spring 2001.)	August 14, 2001	US home video distributions
Bob the Builder	May 22, 2001	August 7, 2001	US home video distributions
Kipper	June 5, 2001		US home video distributions

=== Movies/TV Films ===
Name	Year	Notes
Kids for Character	1996	Includes scenes from The Puzzle Place, Barney & Friends, The Magic School Bus, Lamb Chop's Play-Along, Gullah Gullah Island, and Babar
Kids for Character: Choices Count	1997	Includes scenes from Bananas in Pyjamas, The Big Comfy Couch, and Wishbone
Wishbone's Dog Days of the West	1998	Big Feats! Entertainment
Barney's Great Adventure	1998	Distributed by PolyGram Filmed Entertainment
Mother Goose Rock 'n' Rhyme	1998	Originally released in 1990

=== Unrealized projects ===
In November 1998, it was announced that BJ of Barney & Friends was going to have his own animated spin-off series titled BJ and the Radical Rumblebutts which would've been produced by Lyrick Studios and Toronto's Portfolio Films. However, the project never came to fruition.
