= Julie Johnson (actress) =

American actress

- Born: Whitewright, Texas, U.S.
- Education: Austin College
- Occupation: Actress
- Years active: 1981–present
- Spouse: Dylan Paul Thomas (m. 1981; div. 1987)
- Children: 1

Julie Johnson is an American actress who voiced the character Baby Bop on the PBS television series Barney & Friends, as well as its predecessor, Barney & the Backyard Gang (debuting in Barney in Concert in 1991).

== Early life ==
Johnson was the valedictorian of the 1977 graduating class of Whitewright High School, in Whitewright, Texas.

== Career ==
=== Barney ===
Johnson portrayed Baby Bop from 1991 until 2010.

Sonny Franks, who appeared in the direct-to-video specials Come on Over to Barney's House and Let's Go to the Fire House, wrote a few songs for Johnson's discography.

Johnson was meant to be interviewed for the 2022 documentary about the show entitled I Love You, You Hate Me, but due to conflicts between her time on tour and when the crew could film, it didn't work out.

=== Later career ===
Later roles in Johnson's career include A Closer Walk with Patsy Cline, in which she played the legendary country singer Patsy Cline and in Come From Away as Beulah.

== Personal life ==
Johnson married her husband Dylan Paul Thomas in 1981. The marriage lasted for six years until they divorced in 1987. Thomas passed away on May 30, 2008 at the age of 48.
