= The Lyons Group =

American video production group, 1986–1994

- Founded: 1986; 40 years ago
- Defunct: 1994; 32 years ago
- Fate: Became a subsidiary of Lyrick Studios, which became a subsidiary of HIT Entertainment which got bought by Mattel
- Successors: Lyrick Studios
- Headquarters: Richardson, Texas, U.S.
- Key people: Sheryl Leach (President, 1988-1995); Ernest Z. Frausto (President); Debbie Ries (Sales VP); Joyce Slocum (Legal/Business VP); Lynn Mabry (Finance/Operations VP); Sue Bristol (Marketing Director); Dennis DeShazer (Executive Producer); Kathy Parker (SVP Business Development)
- Production output: Barney & the Backyard Gang; Barney & Friends
- Owner: DLM, Inc. (1988-1992); RCL Enterprises, Inc. (1992-1993)
- Number of employees: 250 (1993)
- Divisions: Barney Publishing

The Lyons Group (alternatively known through copyright and trademark as Lyons Partnership, L.P.) was a video production group founded in 1986. Currently retaining ownership through copyright, it produced Barney & the Backyard Gang alongside its successor Barney & Friends.

== History ==
=== Beginnings ===
The company traces its origins back to 1986, where it was founded as a B2B video production and corporate training video service. In the late 1980s, Sheryl Leach proposed a preschool video series, which eventually would be Barney & the Backyard Gang, to DLM, Inc (Developmental Learning Materials). At the time Leach was working at DLM, Inc. as a writer. The board she proposed to turned her down. Owner of DLM, Inc., Richard C. Leach, who was Sheryl's father-in-law, agreed to back her with the project with $700,000 of his own money, but $1 million in total was provided for the video project. The Lyons Group was formed by Leach under DLM, Inc., to help market Barney. The company was named after Richard's mother, Bernice Lyons Leach.

=== Ownership & Copyright ===
DLM, Inc. changed its name to RCL Enterprises, Inc. in 1992 due to it divesting itself of Developmental Learning Materials and selling its instructional materials to Macmillian/McGraw Hill and its assessment materials to Riverside Publishing, a subsidiary of Houghton Mifflin. Around this time The Lyons Group began using their alternative name, Lyons Partnership, L.P. through copyright and trademark, which continues to be used today. As the company was growing around this time, The Walt Disney Company was looking to buy the company. Michael Eisner, who was CEO of the company at the time, offered to make Barney as big as Mickey Mouse if the company was sold to Disney, but Leach refused. Jeffrey Katzenberg, who was also a part of The Walt Disney Company at the time, laid out plans he envisioned for Barney if involved with Disney. Again, Leach refused as he liked the idea of the company being independent. In 1994, RCL Enterprises, Inc. was moved to its parent company, Lyrick Corporation. Lyrick Corporation formed the subsidiary Lyrick Studios which held the Lyons Group unit.
