= Barney & the Backyard Gang =

American direct-to-video series

- Genre: Children's direct-to-video series; Musical; Adventure
- Created by: Sheryl Stamps-Leach; Kathy O'Rourke-Parker
- Developed by: Sheryl Stamps-Leach; Kathy O'Rourke-Parker; Dennis DeShazer
- Written by: Frank H. Olsen (1988–1990); Pat Reeder (1988–1989); Kathy O'Rourke Parker (1991); Sheryl Stamps Leach (1991); Dennis DeShazer (1991)
- Directed by: John Grable (1988–1989); Dwin Towell (1990); Garry Potts (1990); Jim Rowley (1991)
- Starring: David Voss; David Joyner; Dao Knight; Sandy Duncan; Brian Eppes; Becky Swonke; Jessica Zucha; Leah Montes; Salim Grant; Rickey Carter; Alexander Jhin; Jeffrey Lowe; Bob Reed
- Voices of: Bob West; Julie Johnson
- Opening theme: Barney & the Backyard Gang Theme Song
- Ending theme: Various
- Composers: Stephen Bates Baltes; Bob Singleton; Lory Lazarus; Philip A. Parker
- Country of origin: United States
- Original language: English
- No. of episodes: 8

Production
- Executive producers: Richard C. Leach (1988–1989); Sheryl Stamps-Leach (1990–1991); Kathy O'Rourke-Parker (1990–1991)
- Producers: John Grable (1988–1989); Dennis DeShazer (1990)
- Production locations: Allen, Texas (6 videos); Dallas, Texas (2 videos)
- Running time: 30 minutes
- Production company: The Lyons Group

Original release
- Release: August 29, 1988 – September 21, 1991

Related
- Barney & Friends

Barney & the Backyard Gang is an American direct-to-video series produced by The Lyons Group and released in periodic installments from August 29, 1988, to September 21, 1991. The first installment in the Barney franchise, the series' success led to the launch of the children's television show, Barney & Friends, which in its original run aired on PBS from April 6, 1992, to November 2, 2010.

The first three videos from 1988 and 1989 include Sandy Duncan as Michael and Amy's mother. (At the time, Duncan was starring on the NBC sitcom The Hogan Family.) Music for the Barney & the Backyard Gang videos was created by Stephen Bates Baltes and Phillip Parker (as with the television series), and Lory Lazarus wrote the first original song produced for Barney, "Friends Are Forever", sung by Duncan. In the first five videos, "I Love You" was sung at the beginning. Although "I Love You" was sung at the end of Barney Goes to School and Barney in Concert, and later frequently sung at the end of almost all the episodes of Barney & Friends, it was not featured at the end of Rock with Barney.

The series was a regional success, but only a moderate success throughout the rest of the country. Then one day, in 1991, Larry Rifkin, then head of Connecticut Public Television, rented a Barney video for his daughter Leora. He liked the concept and talked to Leach about possibly putting Barney on television through the Public Broadcasting Service (PBS). Rock with Barney was the final video in the series before the television show debuted. Also, only four of the kids from the videos (Michael, Derek, Tina, and Luci) were carried over to the television show.

== Production ==
=== Conception ===
In fall 1987, Sheryl Leach was stuck in a traffic jam thinking about the lack of videos that held the attention of her 2-year-old son, Patrick. At this time, the only preschool aged programs around were Sesame Street and Mister Rogers' Neighborhood, however, they appealed to a larger age range, rather than strictly toddlers. At the time, the only thing that could hold Patrick’s attention was a Wee Sing video. This prompted Leach to develop a show herself. Her initial thought was the notice of children carrying snugly security objects, such as blankets and teddy bears. Leach thought the idea of a talking blanket and teddy bear interacting with children were a neat idea, however, the blanket concept was too hard to pull off.

Sheryl Leach proposed a preschool video series, which eventually would be Barney & The Backyard Gang, to DLM, Inc (Developmental Learning Materials). At the time Sheryl Leach was working at DLM, Inc. as a writer. The board she proposed to turned her down. Owner of DLM, Inc., Richard C. Leach, who was Sheryl's father-in-law, agreed to back her with the project with $700,000 of his own money. Sheryl's idea was brought to production at The Lyons Group.

When Leach pitched Barney & The Backyard Gang to her father-in-law, Richard, he asked that Kathy help to develop the character and show concept. Parker also had a 2-year-old child named Kaitlin. Both Leach and Parker began testing videos on their children, taking notes of what worked and what didn't work, as well as going to different preschools for research. The duo took inspiration from their own childhood programs like Romper Room, Captain Kangaroo and The Mickey Mouse Club while also combining aspects of the then current kids' programs like Sesame Street and Mister Rogers' Neighborhood.

From their research, around twenty essential concepts were devised, such as using live-action instead of animation so children could better relate, having children as role-models, featuring simple music and having a familiar setting. They also concluded that imagination needed to play a big role, as well as having loving messages.

The bear concept was eventually scrapped due to Leach's son having an interest in dinosaurs after visiting a Science Place exhibit.

After the initial concept was devised, The Lyons Group hired various local production crew personnel to help further develop the show. They hired Irene Corey Design Associates to build the dinosaur costume. After Irene Corey failed to deliver a plushy, huggable T-Rex costume that would be suitable for the producers' needs, producer John Grable reached out and hired friend Jamie Ruth Conner to serve as the series art director and to design a costume that would be more suitable for the character that was being developed.

After Conner's costume designs were approved by Leach and Parker, costume construction by Suzanne Lockridge took place. When Lockridge asked Conner what color to make Barney she replied, "purple of course!" Conner chose the purple, green, yellow color palate simply because that shade of purple happened to be trendy in the late 1980s.

=== Casting ===
At the time, the crew was considering using one person for both the body and voice of Barney. Bob West was initially cast as the body and voice but he was too tall for the costume they'd already started making. David Voss was brought in to fulfill the costume. In 1990, Voss entered the military as a Cavalry Scout where he was based in Mannheim, He was succeeded in the role by David Joyner.

For a main guardian role (such as a parent and or grandparent), actors such as Robin Williams and Dick Van Dyke were considered. For Michael and Amy's mom, crew members considered having actresses Marlo Thomas and Phylicia Rashad to portray the role. Actress Sandy Duncan was ultimately chosen for the role. John Grable, one of the directors of the video series, flew up to New York during development and had several phone calls with Duncan and her agents to negotiate with and convince her to join the cast. of the show.

=== Filming ===
The majority of filming was done on weekends to allow the child actor cast to attend school. Leach described that a typical Backyard Gang video would take about six weeks; the workload breakdown set aside two days for rehearsals, five days of actual filming, and the rest of the time span for pre and post production.

=== Public Broadcasting Service ===
On Super Bowl Sunday in 1991, executive vice president of programming for Connecticut Public Television, Larry Rifkin, rented the Barney video A Day At The Beach for his 4-year-old daughter Leora Rifkin, which they got from Prospect Video Store, in Prospect, Connecticut. Once they got home, his daughter couldn't stop watching the video. Rifkin tested the video on other children in the neighborhood to make sure the reaction wasn't unusual. Rifkin liked the concept, so he spoke with Leach and other creators about putting Barney on television. At the time, the Corporation for Public Broadcasting had been looking for something new, educational and lively to supplement the programs that were already on television.

In June 1991, it was announced that Barney would have a new show debuting on PBS with a scheduled release for April 1992 with thirty episodes. A $2.25 million grant was given to The Lyons Group and Connecticut Public Television to produce the new show. One of the changes announced for the show was dropping the word "gang" due to it having negative connotations. In October of that year, production began on the new television show, titled Barney & Friends.

== Video list ==
In order of release date:

- The Backyard Show (originally released on August 29, 1988; last reissued in 1992)
- Three Wishes (originally released on December 10, 1988; last reissued in 1992)
- A Day at the Beach (originally released on February 24, 1989; last reissued in 1992)
- Waiting for Santa (originally released on April 30, 1990; last reissued on September 29, 1998)
- Campfire Sing-Along (originally released on May 30, 1990; last reissued on March 26, 1996)
- Barney Goes to School (originally released on August 12, 1990; last reissued on March 26, 1996)
- Barney in Concert (originally released on July 29, 1991; last reissued on July 18, 2000)
- Rock with Barney (Series Finale) (originally released on September 21, 1991; last reissued on March 26, 1996)

=== Unrealized projects ===
A video entitled Barney in Mother Goose Land was originally planned for this series to be on the market in June 1990. Sandy Walper had already been cast to portray as Mother Goose, but the video never went into production. Walper would eventually play Mother Goose in the Barney & Friends episodes "Let's Help Mother Goose!" and "Honk! Honk! A Goose On The Loose!". The Mother Goose land aspect wouldn't be explored until Barney's Rhyme Time Rhythm.

There were plans to re-release the first three videos in 1994 and in November 1995 (under the banner "Barney: The Early Years"), but plans fell through and Lyons instead re-released the last four videos from 1995 to 1996.

== Cast ==
- Baby Bop (Costume) - Dao Knight (1991)
- Baby Bop (Voice) - Julie Johnson (1991)
- Barney (Costume) - David Voss (1988–1990), David Joyner (1991)
- Barney (Voice) - Bob West (1988–1991)
- Adam - Alexander Jhin (1988–1991)
- Amy - Becky Swonke (1988–1991)
- Michael and Amy's Dad - Bob Reed (1988–1989)
- Derek - Rickey Carter (1990–1991)
- Jason - Salim Grant (1988–1989)
- Jeffrey - Jeffrey Lowe (1990)
- Luci - Leah Gloria (1988–1991)
- Michael - Brian Eppes (1988–1991)
- Michael and Amy's Mom - Sandy Duncan (1988–1989)
- Tina - Jessica Zucha (1988–1991)

=== Guest appearances ===
- Pete Markham (played Farmer Earl in Three Wishes)
- Eli (played himself in Three Wishes)
- Nome (performed Moonkin in Three Wishes and Molly the Mermaid in A Day at the Beach)
- Sandy Duncan (voiced Molly the Mermaid in A Day at the Beach)
- Jeanne Cairns (played Mrs. Claus in Waiting for Santa)
- Henry Hammack (played Santa Claus in Waiting for Santa)
- Sonya Resendez (played Luci and Tina's Mom in Campfire Sing-Along)
- Philip Parker (performed as the Bear in Campfire Sing-Along)
- Bob West (voiced the Bear in Campfire Sing-Along and Goldilocks and the Three Bears Puppets in Barney Goes To School)
- Christina Bass, Michael Bertolino, Jenilee Candari, Jana Evans, and A.J. Schrader (played National Talent Search Winners in Barney Goes To School)
- Lauren King (played Kathy in Rock with Barney)
- Alexis Harris (played Jennifer in Rock with Barney)
- Ajay Reddy (played AJ in Rock with Barney)
- Chris Rodriguez (played Joseph in Rock with Barney)
- Lourdes Regala (played Adam's Mom in Rock with Barney)

== Syndication ==
The first six videos of this series aired on The Disney Channel in November 1990 as a part of its "Music Box" program.

== Accolades ==
| Year | Award | Show | Result | References |
|---|---|---|---|---|
| 1989 | Parents Choice Award | A Day at the Beach | Won | |
| 1990 | California Children's Video Award | Barney & the Backyard Gang | Won | |
| 1990 | Film Advisory Board Award of Excellence | Barney & the Backyard Gang | Won | |

== See also ==
- List of Barney and Friends episodes
