= Bob West =

American voice actor and graphic designer

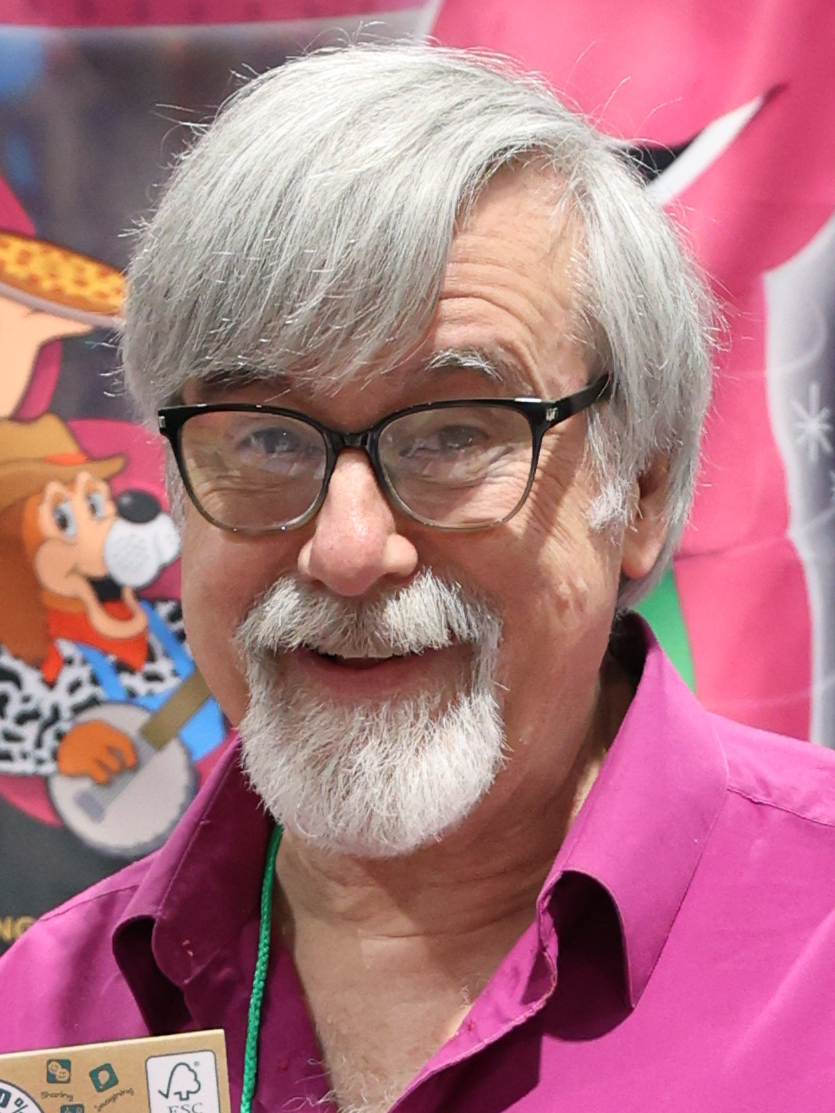
- West at GalaxyCon 2025
- Born: Robert Matthew West; June 25, 1956 (age 70); Finleyville, Pennsylvania, U.S.
- Occupations: Voice actor; graphic designer
- Years active: 1979–present

YouTube information
- Channel: @YesThatBobWest
- Years active: 2007–present
- Genres: Voice acting; Podcasting; Entertainment; Live streaming
- Subscribers: 4.34K thousand
- Views: 980K thousand
- Website: bobwest.com

Robert Matthew West (born June 25, 1956) is an American voice actor, and graphic designer. He is best known as the original voice of Barney the Dinosaur in the PBS children's television series Barney & Friends, and its preceding home video series Barney & the Backyard Gang.

== Career ==
=== 1979–1988: Early voice work career ===
After graduating from Trinity University in San Antonio with an art degree, West began his voice acting career in 1979.

In 1986, he was cast as the voices of Jasper T. Jowls and Pasqually in Chuck E. Cheese's animatronic stage show. He voiced the characters for ten years, until 1998.

West has also done voice work for various television commercials and ads.

=== 1988–2001: Barney ===
West became the voice of Barney the Dinosaur in 1988. His first voice work as Barney was for the direct-to-video pilot series Barney & the Backyard Gang. He continued voicing Barney in the television series Barney & Friends and the 1998 film Barney's Great Adventure, as well as live performances, toys, and music. In addition, West voiced Barney for appearances on radio shows, CBS and NBC primetime specials, the Daytime Emmy Awards, and several talk shows, such as The Today Show, Live with Regis & Kathie Lee, The Oprah Winfrey Show, The Phil Donahue Show, John & Leeza from Hollywood, Marilu, and appearances around the world.

In 2001, he retired from voicing Barney after 13 years, saying that he wanted "new challenges" in his life. He was temporarily replaced by David Franks and Duncan Brannan, who met him through their affiliation with Chuck E. Cheese, then by Tim Dever (father of Kaitlyn Dever) and Dean Wendt.

However, West's voice could still be heard in A Day in the Park with Barney at Universal Studios Florida until the attraction's closure in February 2021, as it was recorded in the mid-1990s. Archival recordings of West as Barney were also used in some of HIT Entertainment's The Little Big Club live stage shows until October 12, 2022.

=== 2001–present: Later career and graphic design ===
West provided voices for TV and radio ads for Pepsi, Bud Light (in both English and Spanish), Coors Light, Frito-Lay, KFC, Armour Meats, Circuit City, Texas Monthly Magazine, and Texas Lottery. He also worked as a creative director, writer, producer and director in various radio and television commercials.

In 2022, West appeared in I Love You, You Hate Me, a Peacock documentary miniseries about the negative reactions to Barney.

West now works as a graphic designer for film and television.

== Filmography ==
=== Film ===
Year	Title	Role	Notes
1998	Barney's Great Adventure	Barney (voice)	

=== Television ===
Year	Title	Role	Notes
1988–1991	Barney & the Backyard Gang	Barney (voice)	8 episodes Video series
1992–2000	Barney & Friends	Barney (voice)	128 episodes
2022	I Love You, You Hate Me	Barney (voice, archive recordings); Himself	2 episodes Documentary miniseries

=== Video games ===
Year	Title	Role	Notes
1993	Barney's Hide & Seek Game	Barney	
1997	Fun on the Farm with Barney	Barney	
1997	Barney Under the Sea	Barney	
1997	Barney Goes to the Circus	Barney	
1997	Barney's Fun on Imagination Island	Barney	
	Take-Two Interactive	Demo voices	E3 video game demos

=== Other work ===
Year	Title	Role	Notes
1986–1998	Chuck E. Cheese	Jasper T. Jowls (1986–1994, 1996–1998); Mr. Munch (1995–1996); Pasqually P. Pieplate (1986–1994, 1995–1998)	Animatronic stage show
1995–2021	A Day in the Park with Barney	Barney	Theme park attraction; archive recordings

=== Commercials and ads ===
Title	Notes
Pepsi	
Bud Light	(English and Spanish)
Coors Light	
Frito-Lay	
KFC	
Armour Meats	
Circuit City	
Texas Monthly Magazine	
Texas Lottery	

== Production credits ==
Year	Title	Position	Notes
1997	Still Breathing	Art director	Film
1999	Thick as Thieves	Graphic designer	Uncredited
2000	Picking Up the Pieces	Graphic designer	Uncredited
2000	Thirteen Days	Graphic designer	Uncredited
2001	Jurassic Park III	Graphic designer	Uncredited (Note: A clip from a videocassette copy of Barney's Musical Castle (with The Wiggles sometimes) is shown on a television set.)
2003	Down with Love	Graphic designer	Uncredited
2003	The Italian Job	Graphic designer	Uncredited
2004	Anchorman: The Legend of Ron Burgundy	Graphic designer	Uncredited
2005	Be Cool	Graphic designer	Uncredited
2005	Herbie Fully Loaded	Graphic designer	Uncredited
2005	House of the Dead 2	Graphic designer	Uncredited
2006	10 Items or Less	Graphic designer	Uncredited
2006	Schools for Scoundrels	Graphic designer	Uncredited
2007	October Road	Graphic designer	Episode: "Pilot"; uncredited
2007	Hustle	Graphic designer	2 episodes; uncredited
2009	Black Dynamite	Graphic designer	Uncredited
2009	The Proposal	Graphic designer	Uncredited
2009–2015	Community	Graphic designer	34 episodes
2011	Hop	Graphic designer	Uncredited
2012	90210	Graphic designer	2 episodes; uncredited
2013	Anatomy of Violence	Graphic designer	Uncredited
2014	Chef	Graphic designer	Uncredited
2014–2015	Castle	Graphic designer	4 episodes
2015–2016	The Muppets	Graphic designer	8 episodes
2016	The Sweet Life	Graphic designer	Film
2016	Aztec Warrior	Graphic designer	Film
2016–2019	Speechless	Graphic designer	62 episodes
2017	Wish Upon	Graphic designer	Film
2017	Raised by Wolves	Graphic designer	TV movie
2017–2018	The Mick	Graphic designer	20 episodes
2018	Three Rivers	Graphic designer	TV movie
2018–2020	Single Parents	Graphic designer	18 episodes
2020	9-1-1: Lone Star	Graphic designer	Episode: "Yee-Haw"
2021	The Rookie	Graphic designer	5 episodes
2022	Swimming with Sharks	Graphic designer	6 episodes
2022	Love, Victor	Graphic artist	Episode: "You Up?"

== Notes ==
Preceded by N/A	Voice of Barney; 1988–2001	Succeeded by Dean Wendt
