= List of people from Arvada, Colorado =

Coordinates: 39.8028°N 105.0875°W

Location of Arvada in Colorado

This is a list of some notable people who have lived in the City of Arvada, Colorado, United States.

== Arts and entertainment ==
=== Art ===
- Bruce Blackburn (1938–2021), graphic designer of the United States Bicentennial logo

=== Fashion ===
- Taylor Marie Hill (born 1996), model

=== Film, television, and theatre ===
- Barry Kooser (born 1968), animator
- Nick Stabile (born 1971), actor
- Matt Weatherford (born 1967), film critic

=== Literature ===
- Clive Cussler (1931–2020), novelist, explorer
- Kristen Iversen, non-fiction writer
- Bonnie Leman (1926–2010), writer and magazine publisher

=== Music ===
- Chris Daring, fiddler
- Brian Ibbott (born 1969), music podcaster, producer
- Joe King (born 1980), guitarist, songwriter
- Hazel Miller (born 1954), vocalist, Colorado Music Hall of Fame
- Ivan Moody (born 1980) singer and songwriter
- Isaac Slade (born 1981), pianist, singer-songwriter

== Politics ==
=== National ===
- Bob Beauprez (born 1948), U.S. representative
- Karl Rove (born 1950), Republican political consultant, senior advisor to the president of the United States, and deputy chief of staff

=== State ===
- Sara Gagliardi (born 1958), Colorado state legislator
- Evie Hudak (born 1951), Colorado state legislator
- Brianna Titone (born 1978), Colorado state legislator
- John Charles Vivian (1889–1964), 30th governor of Colorado
- Laura J. Woods (born 1961), Colorado state legislator
- Rachel Zenzinger, Colorado state legislator

=== Local ===
- Joanne Conte (1933–2013), Arvada city councilwoman, early transgender activist

== Military ==
- William Hemphill Bell (1834–1906), US Army brigadier general

== Religion ==
- James D. Conley (born 1955), Roman Catholic bishop
- Bob Enyart (1959–2021), fundamentalist Christian pastor, radio host

== Sports ==
=== American football ===
- Greg Brown (born 1957), coach
- Patrick Cain (1962–2016), center, guard
- Mark Cooney (1951–2011), linebacker
- Joe DeCamillis (born 1965), coach
- Joel Klatt (born 1982), quarterback, sportscaster
- Brian Lee (born 1975), defensive back
- Kevin McDougal (born 1977), running back
- Cliff Olander (born 1955), quarterback
- Brad Pyatt (born 1980), wide receiver
- Dan Skipper (born 1994), offensive tackle

=== Baseball ===
- Tagg Bozied (born 1979), 1st baseman
- Roy Halladay (1977–2017), pitcher

=== Bodybuilding ===
- Phil Heath (born 1979), bodybuilder, 13th Mr. Olympia
- Alina Popa (born 1978), IFBB professional bodybuilder

=== Martial arts ===
- Justin Gaethje (born 1987), mixed martial arts fighter
- Neil Magny (born 1987), mixed martial arts fighter
- Matt Wiman (born 1983), mixed martial arts fighter

=== Other ===
- Rick Carelli (born 1955), race car driver
- Nick Fazekas (born 1985), basketball center, power forward
- Casey Malone (born 1977), U.S. Olympic discus thrower
- Erika Sutton (born 1987), soccer defender
- Babe Didrikson Zaharias (1911–1956), U.S. Olympic track and field athlete, golfer

== Crime ==
- Ahmad Al Aliwi Al-Issa (born 1999), 2021 Boulder mass-shooter

== See also ==
- List of people from Colorado
- Bibliography of Colorado
- Geography of Colorado
- History of Colorado
- Index of Colorado-related articles
- List of Colorado-related lists
- Outline of Colorado
