= Hallie Eisenberg =

American former child actress (born 1992)

- Born: Hallie Kate Eisenberg; August 2, 1992 (age 34); New Brunswick, New Jersey, U.S.
- Education: American University
- Occupation: Actress
- Years active: 1998–2011; 2019
- Relatives: Jesse Eisenberg (brother)

Hallie Kate Eisenberg (born August 2, 1992) is an American actress known for featuring in a series of Pepsi commercials as a child, and for her roles in the films Paulie (1998) and How to Eat Fried Worms (2006). She has not performed as an actress since 2010.

== Early life ==
Hallie Kate Eisenberg was born in New Brunswick, New Jersey, to Amy and Barry Eisenberg, who ran a hospital and later became a college professor. She has two siblings: actor Jesse Eisenberg and Kerri. Hallie was named after the character Hallie O'Fallon in the film All I Want for Christmas, portrayed by Thora Birch. She was brought up in a secular Jewish family. Raised in East Brunswick, New Jersey, Eisenberg attended East Brunswick High School. Eisenberg attended American University, and earned a degree in International Studies from the School of Public Affairs in 2014.

== Career ==
In the late 1990s and early 2000s, she was "The Pepsi Girl" in a series of Pepsi commercials. She made her film debut in the children's film Paulie, playing the young owner of the title parrot. After appearing in a few made-for-television films, she had supporting parts in 1999's The Insider and Bicentennial Man.

In 2000, Eisenberg co-starred with Minnie Driver in the feature film Beautiful, which received generally negative reviews. She also starred as Helen Keller in a television remake of The Miracle Worker. In 2004, she played opposite Jeff Daniels and Patricia Heaton in the television remake of The Goodbye Girl. In 2006, Eisenberg appeared in How to Eat Fried Worms, the New Line Cinema adaptation of Thomas Rockwell's book of the same name. In 2007, she co-starred in the independent feature film P.J.

Eisenberg made her Broadway debut in Roundabout Theatre's production of Clare Boothe Luce's play The Women. In 2010, she halted her film career to attend college. She was credited as an assistant to the producers of the 2019 film The Art of Self-Defense, which starred her brother Jesse.

== Filmography ==
Year	Film	Role	Notes	Ref.
1998	Paulie	Marie Alweather	Film	
1998	Nicholas' Gift	Eleanor	Television film	
1999	Blue Moon	Josie Medieros	Television film	
1999	Swing Vote	Jenny Kirkland	Television film	
1999	A Little Inside	Abby Mills		
1999	The Insider	Barbara Wigand	Film	
1999	Bicentennial Man	Young "Little Miss" Amanda Martin	Film	
2000	Get Real	Alexa	Television series – Episode: "Waiting"	
2000	Beautiful	Vanessa	Film	
2000	The Miracle Worker	Helen Keller	Television film	
2002	Stage on Screen: The Women	Little Mary	Television film	
2003	Presidio Med	Grace Rothman	Television series – Episode: "With Grace"	
2004	The Goodbye Girl	Lucy McFadden	Television film	
2005	Jesus, Mary and Joey	Melissa		
2006	How to Eat Fried Worms	Erika "Erk" Tansy	Film	
2008	P.J.	Pauline		
2008	Wild Child	Ruthie	Film	
2010	Holy Rollers	Ruth Gold	Film	
