= Golden State Pops Orchestra =

American symphony pops orchestra

Golden State Pops Orchestra (GSPO)
- Orchestra
- Founded: 2002
- Location: Los Angeles, California
- Concert hall: Redondo Beach Performing Arts Center
- Principal conductor: Steven Allen Fox
- Website: www.gspo.com www.lafilmorchestra.com

The Golden State Pops Orchestra (GSPO) is an American symphony pops orchestra located in the greater Los Angeles region of Southern California, with performances at the Redondo Beach Performing Arts Center. The orchestra is part of the Entertainment in Music Association, which also includes the Los Angeles Film Orchestra and Overture Youth Orchestra LA. The GSPO was the resident orchestra of the Warner Grand Theatre for 20 years, an Art Deco movie palace built by Warner Brothers Studios in 1931. The orchestra performs a wide variety of musical repertoire, including video game soundtracks, classical, Broadway, and pop music. However, the primary focus of the GSPO remains film music, a specialty of the orchestra since its founding in 2002. The Golden State Pops Orchestra is composed of professional freelance musicians from around the Los Angeles area.

== History ==
The Golden State Pops Orchestra (GSPO) was founded in 2002 by conductor and composer Steven Allen Fox, a graduate of the University of Southern California's Scoring for Motion Pictures and Television (SMPTV) program. Joshua Godoy, also a USC film scoring graduate, served as the assistant conductor. Initially functioning as the instrumental division of the Southeast Civic Light Opera in Los Alamitos, California, the orchestra's original home venue was the Liberty Theatre on the Los Alamitos Joint Forces Military Base.

The first public performance of the Golden State Pops Orchestra took place on April 6, 2002, at the Riviera United Methodist Church in Redondo Beach, California. The concert featured film music, and was titled Hooked on Film Scores. The Orchestra then performed four additional concerts in 2002, mostly at the Liberty Theatre.

Following its début season, the GSPO separated from the Southeast Civic Light Opera and moved its performances to the Long Beach Events Center (Scottish Rite Cathedral) in Long Beach, California, for a portion of the 2003–2004 season, beginning with a St. Patrick's Day themed concert titled St. Pat Goes Pops! on March 15, 2003, and continuing with four additional concerts in Long Beach. In 2004, the orchestra moved to its current home venue, the Warner Grand Theatre in San Pedro, California, premiering with a Valentine's Day themed concert titled Music for Lovers and Other Strangers on February 7, 2004.

Since 2004, the GSPO has become the resident orchestra of the Warner Grand Theatre, and has grown into a professional ensemble of around 60 musicians. It continues to specialize in live performances of film scores, and frequently introduces new film music repertoire to its audiences; music that has not been performed since it was first recorded at the original scoring sessions. In 2005, the orchestra gave the North American concert premiere of film composer John Williams' Battle of the Heroes from Star Wars: Episode III – Revenge of the Sith as part of its all Star Wars concert. Since 2005, the orchestra has presented over seventy world premieres to its audiences, both from recent films such as Drag Me to Hell, Avatar, Astro Boy, Superman Returns, and Scream as well as older films such as Three Amigos, Mysterious Island, and The Fall of the Roman Empire.

== GSPO Ensemble Series ==
In addition to its regular full orchestra concerts, the Entertainment in Music Association, of which the Golden State Pops Orchestra is part, also presents a series of chamber music concerts around the South Bay. The GSPO Ensemble Series concerts consist of regular orchestra members who perform chamber music in a wide variety of styles from film and television music to classical repertoire.

== World premieres ==
The Golden State Pops Orchestra has focused on live concert performances of film music from its inception. Due to the orchestra's connections with the film and music industry in Los Angeles, it has been able to perform many pieces of music for the first time outside the original films, often with the original composer in attendance or even conducting the orchestra. Some of the world premieres that have been performed by the GSPO include:

2014

- Elmer Bernstein: Comedy Suite, featuring music from the films Animal House, Airplane!, Stripes, Trading Places, Three Amigos and Spies Like Us. Arranged and conducted by the composer's son, Peter Bernstein. (February 15, 2014)
- Elmer Bernstein: Rarely Performed Works, a suite featuring Silver from the 1956 LP, Frank Sinatra Conducts Tone Poems of Color as well as Bernstein's scores to the films Desire Under the Elms and Stripes. Also featuring music from the composer's rejected scores to the films The Journey of Natty Gann and A River Runs Through It. Arranged and conducted by the composer's son, Peter Bernstein. (February 15, 2014)

2013

- Vince Guaraldi: A Charlie Brown Christmas Suite, arranged and conducted by William Ross. (December 21, 2013)
- Bernard Herrmann: A Christmas Carol, with script and lyrics by Maxwell Anderson. (December 21, 2013)
- Elmer Bernstein: Suite from Ghostbusters, as arranged and orchestrated by Randy Edelman, with the arranger conducting and Sara Andon as flute soloist. (October 19, 2013)
- Bernard Herrmann: Suite from The Ghost and Mrs. Muir, conducted by John Debney. (October 19, 2013)
- Varèse Sarabande Halloween Overture featuring music from the films Halloween, A Nightmare on Elm Street, The Fly, Psycho, and The Omen. Arranged and conducted by Joseph LoDuca. (October 19, 2013)
- Christopher Young: Suite from Ghost Rider, featuring Dave Lombardo as drum soloist and the band Philm. (October 19, 2013)
- John Williams: Here They Come, Luke and Leia, The Asteroid Field, The Forest Battle, and Cantina Band from Hal Leonard's newly published orchestral suite The Star Wars Saga. (June 15, 2013)
- Gordy Haab: Star Wars: The Old Republic Suite from the game Star Wars: The Old Republic with the composer in attendance. (June 15, 2013)
- Kyle Newmaster & Gordy Haab: Star Wars Kinect Suite from the game Kinect Star Wars with the composers in attendance. (June 15, 2013)
- Kyle Newmaster & Gordy Haab: Main Theme from Ryan vs. Dorkman 2 with the composers in attendance. (June 15, 2013)
- Joel McNeely: The Southern Underground from Star Wars: Shadows of the Empire. (June 15, 2013)
- Varèse Sarabande 35th Anniversary Overture featuring music from the films The Sea Hawk, Basic Instinct, The Boy Who Could Fly, Unforgiven, Back to the Future Part III, and City Slickers. (May 11, 2013)
- Varèse Sarabande 35th Anniversary Sci-Fi Overture featuring music from the films The Iron Giant, Lifeforce, Terminator 2: Judgment Day, RoboCop, The Abyss, Air Force One, Aliens, The Matrix, and Stargate with Christopher Lennertz conducting. (May 11, 2013)
- John Debney: Theme from The Ant Bully, with the composer conducting. (May 11, 2013)
- Michael Giacchino: Suite from Star Trek Into Darkness, with the composer conducting. (May 11, 2013)
- Harry Gregson-Williams: Music from Shrek. (May 11, 2013)
- Danny Elfman: Music from Pee-Wee's Big Adventure, with the composer in attendance. (May 11, 2013)
- Elmer Bernstein: To Kill a Mockingbird as arranged by Austin Wintory, with the arranger conducting and Sara Andon as flute soloist. (May 11, 2013)
- Georges Delerue: A Little Romance, with Sara Andon as flute soloist. (American premiere, May 11, 2013)
- Alex North: Spartacus Love Theme as arranged by Lee Holdridge, with Diego Navarro conducting and Sara Andon as flute soloist. (American premiere, May 11, 2013)
- Joel McNeely: Music from Iron Will, with the composer conducting. (American premiere, May 11, 2013)
- Alan Silvestri: Family Theme from The Croods, with the composer in attendance. Premiered before the film's release. (February 16, 2013)

2011

- John Debney: Music from Elf, as arranged by Victor Pesavento (December 17, 2011)
- Andrew Lloyd Webber: Phantasia, based on The Phantom of the Opera, as arranged and orchestrated by Geoffrey Alexander. Featuring Alyssa Park, violin and Timothy Loo, cello. (North American premiere: October 29, 2011)
- Austin Wintory: Boxes of Earth, with the composer conducting. Featuring Lisbeth Scott, vocalist (October 29, 2011)
- Nathan Barr: Collection of Cues from the HBO series True Blood, with the composer in attendance. Featuring Lisbeth Scott, vocalist (October 29, 2011)
- Richard M. Sherman: The Eyes of Love, a song deleted from film Mary Poppins, as arranged by Jonathan Hughes (September 24, 2011)
- Richard M. Sherman: Mary Poppins Medley, consisting of songs from the film Mary Poppins, as arranged and adapted by Victor Pesavento and Jonathan Hughes (September 24, 2011)
- Richard M. Sherman: Animation Medley, consisting of songs from the films The Many Adventures of Winnie the Pooh, The Aristocats, Charlotte's Web and The Jungle Book, as arranged and adapted by Victor Pesavento and Jonathan Hughes (September 24, 2011)
- Richard M. Sherman: Four Forgotten Dreams, orchestral setting by Stu Phillips (September 24, 2011)
- Richard M. Sherman: Overture from the film Tom Sawyer, as arranged and orchestrated by John Williams (September 24, 2011)
- Richard M. Sherman: Chitty Chitty Bang Bang, a medley consisting of Hushabye Mountain and Chitty Chitty Bang Bang, as arranged by Jonathan Hughes (September 24, 2011)
- Richard M. Sherman: Fortuosity, from The Happiest Millionaire, as arranged by Victor Pesavento and Jonathan Hughes (September 24, 2011)
- Richard M. Sherman: Enchanted Journeys, a medley of music from Disney Theme parks, including The Wonderful World of Color, Magic Journeys, The Tiki Tiki Tiki Room, and There's a Great Big Beautiful Tomorrow, as arranged by Jonathan Hughes (September 24, 2011)
- Richard M. Sherman: The Slipper and the Rose Waltz, a tone poem based on themes from the film The Slipper and the Rose, as arranged by Stu Phillips (September 24, 2011)
- Richard M. Sherman: Ten Feet Off The Ground, from the film The One and Only, Genuine, Original Family Band as arranged by Stu Phillips (September 24, 2011)
- Richard M. Sherman: Five Rockin' Oldies, a medley of The Monkey's Uncle, Tall Paul, Pineapple Princess, Let's Get Together, and You're Sixteen, as arranged by Stu Phillips (September 24, 2011)
- Jerry Goldsmith: The Gold Standard, a medley of thirty of Goldsmith's film score themes, as arranged by Austin Wintory (June 11, 2011)
- Sean Murray: Deviant from the video game, Call of Duty: Black Ops, with the composer and the orchestrator in attendance (April 9, 2011)
- Austin Wintory: Journey - Suite I, with the composer conducting. Featuring Tina Guo, cello soloist (April 9, 2011)
- Gerard Marino: City of Darkness/City of Light from the video game DC Universe Online, with the composer conducting (April 9, 2011)
- Russell Brower: The Shattering from the video game World of Warcraft: Cataclysm with the composer in attendance (April 9, 2011)

2010
- Christopher Young: Concerto to Hell (End Credits) from the film Drag Me to Hell featuring the violin soloist from the original soundtrack, Mark Robertson (October 30, 2010)
- Erich Wolfgang Korngold: Tomorrow, Op. 33 from the film The Constant Nymph featuring guest conductor Jeffrey Schindler and mezzo-soprano Bonnie Snell Schindler. (West coast premiere - October 30, 2010)
- Disney in Concert: Tale as Old as Time (West coast premiere - May 22, 2010)
- James Horner: concert suite from the film Avatar (February 6, 2010)
- Christopher Young: End Credits from the film Creation, with the composer in attendance. Featuring Paul Henning, solo violin & Jonathan Hughes, piano (February 6, 2010)
- Michael Giacchino: Lost Suite from the television series Lost (North American Premiere - February 6, 2010)
- Alex North: Blanche from the film A Streetcar Named Desire, as arranged by film composer Elmer Bernstein (February 6, 2010)
- Leonard Bernstein: Love Theme from the film On the Waterfront, as arranged by film composer Elmer Bernstein (February 6, 2010)

2009
- John Ottman: End Titles from the film Astro Boy with the original orchestrator, Jason Livesay, conducting and the composer in attendance (October 24, 2009)
- Stu Phillips: Variations for Piano and Orchestra featuring Robert Thies, piano (October 24, 2009)
- Stu Phillips: Buck Rogers Suite #1 from the television series Buck Rogers in the 25th Century with the composer conducting (October 24, 2009)
- Stu Phillips: The Name of the Game is Kill from the 1968 film of the same name, with the composer conducting
- Bear McCreary: Colonial Anthem Variations from the television series Battlestar Galactica with the composer conducting (October 24, 2009)
- Wataru Hokoyama: Afrika and Savanna from the video game Afrika with the composer conducting (May 16, 2009)
- Timothy Michael Wynn: Red Faction: Guerilla Suite from the video game Red Faction: Guerrilla with the composer conducting (May 16, 2009)
- Gerard Marino: The End Begins (To Rock) from the video games God of War II and Guitar Hero III: Legends of Rock with the composer conducting (May 16, 2009)
- Laura Karpman: O'er Thai Landis from the video game Untold Legends: Dark Kingdom (May 16, 2009)
- Christopher Lennertz: Main Title from the video game Warhawk with the composer conducting (May 16, 2009)
- Christopher Lennertz: Gun Suite from the video game Gun with the composer conducting (May 16, 2009)
- Russell Brower: Main Title from the video game World of Warcraft: Wrath of the Lich King with the composer in attendance (May 16, 2009)
- Austin Wintory: The World of flOw from the video game flOw with the composer conducting (May 16, 2009)
- Austin Wintory: Captain Abu Raed Suite from the film Captain Abu Raed with the composer in attendance (February 7, 2009)
- Elmer Bernstein: Elmer Bernstein Medley from the films The Great Escape, Stripes and The Magnificent Seven as arranged by Victor Pesavento (February 7, 2009)

2008
- Bernard Herrmann: Suite from the film Mysterious Island (October 25, 2008)
- Bernard Herrmann: Children of Hydra's Teeth from the film Jason and the Argonauts (October 25, 2008)
- Irving Gertz: Eskimos Attacked from the film The Deadly Mantis with the composer in attendance (October 25, 2008)

Note: This was the final concert the composer attended before his death on November 14th, 2008.

- Max Steiner: Selections from the 1933 film King Kong as reconstructed and orchestrated by John Morgan & William Stromberg (October 25, 2008)
- Joseph LoDuca: Main Title from the film The Messengers (October 25, 2008)
- Hans J. Salter and Frank Skinner: Suite from Frankenstein Meets the Wolf Man (October 25, 2008)
- Frank Skinner: Main Title and Finale from the film Abbott and Costello Meet Frankenstein (October 25, 2008)
- Herman Stein: Suite from the 1955 film Tarantula (October 25, 2008)
- George Shaw: J-ok'el from the film J-ok-el: Legend of La Llorona with the composer conducting (October 25, 2008)
- Steven Allen Fox: Unleashed: A Journey Into Fear with the composer conducting and featuring Melissa Kaplan, soprano (October 25, 2008)
- Sam Spence: Ye Sons of USC (Fight Song donated to the University of Southern California) with the composer conducting (June 14, 2008)
- Christopher Lennertz: Main Title from the video game Medal of Honor: Pacific Assault with the composer conducting (May 24, 2008)
- Christopher Young: Main Theme from the film Murder in the First with the composer in attendance (February 9, 2008)

2007
- Jerry Goldsmith: Suite from the film Omen III: The Final Conflict as reconstructed by Leigh Phillips (October 27, 2007)
- Marco Beltrami: Suite from the films Scream and Scream 2 with the composer in attendance (October 27, 2007)
- John Ottman: Suite from the film Fantastic Four: Rise of the Silver Surfer with the orchestrator, Damon Intrabartolo, conducting and the composer in attendance (June 9, 2007)
- John Ottman: Superman Returns Concerto from the film Superman Returns with the orchestrator, Damon Intrabartolo, conducting and the composer in attendance.

Also featured the pianist from the original soundtrack, Eric Anderson, playing the solo part (June 9, 2007)

- Bob & Barn: Suite from the video game MediEvil: Resurrection with the composers in attendance (February 3, 2007)
- Jason & Nolan Livesay: Triwizard Suite from the DVD Game to the film Harry Potter and the Goblet of Fire with the composer, Jason Livesay, conducting (February 3, 2007)
- Joey Newman: Main Title from the video game Lineage (February 3, 2007)
- Colin O'Malley: Suite from the video game Superman Returns (February 3, 2007)

2006
- Dimitri Tiomkin: The First Christmas for orchestra, soprano soloist and choir (December 17, 2006)
- Steven Allen Fox: Overture from Symphonic Suite from Battleworlds with the composer conducting (August 20, 2006)

2005
- Christopher Young: Suite from the film Urban Legend with the composer in attendance (October 30, 2005)
- John Williams: Battle of the Heroes from the film Star Wars: Episode III – Revenge of the Sith (North American premiere - May 21, 2005)
- Dimitri Tiomkin: The Fall of Love (for string orchestra) from the film The Fall of the Roman Empire (April 9, 2005)
- Elmer Bernstein: End Credits from the film Three Amigos (February 19, 2005)

== (2013–2014) ==
Date	Concert	Guest artists	Notes
October 19, 2013	Varèse Sarabande 35th Anniversary Halloween Gala	Marco Beltrami, composer & guest conductor John Debney, guest conductor Christopher Young, composer Brian Tyler, composer & guest conductor Joseph LoDuca, composer & guest conductor Randy Edelman, composer & guest conductor Lee Holdridge, composer & guest conductor Charles Bernstein, composer Nathan Barr, composer Cliff Eidelman, guest conductor Dave Lombardo, drummer Sara Andon, flute soloist Robert Townson, host The Golden State Pops Chorale	Fourth concert celebrating the 35th anniversary of Varèse Sarabande
December 21, 2013	Varèse Sarabande 35th Anniversary Holiday Gala	John Debney, composer & guest conductor William Ross, arranger & guest conductor Sara Andon, flute soloist Robert Townson, host The Golden State Pops Holiday Chorale	Fifth concert celebrating the 35th anniversary of the Varèse Sarabande
February 15, 2014	Great Composer Tribute: Elmer Bernstein	Peter Bernstein, arranger & guest conductor Bear McCreary, accordionist & guest speaker John Landis, guest speaker Richard Kraft, guest speaker	The late composer's family was in attendance.
May 10, 2014	Sweeney Todd In Concert		

== Previous season (2012–2013) ==
Date	Concert	Guest artists	Notes
December 15, 2012	Holiday Pops Spectacular	The Golden State Pops Holiday Chorale	
February 16, 2013	Great Composer Tribute: The Music of Alan Silvestri	Alan Silvestri, guest composer and guest conductor Robert Townson, host	First concert in a series celebrating the 35th anniversary of the Varèse Sarabande record label. Composer Alan Silvestri was in attendance and conducted his concert suite from Forrest Gump.
May 11, 2013	Varèse Sarabande's 35th Anniversary Gala	Hans Zimmer, composer and pianist Danny Elfman, composer Mark Isham, composer Brian Tyler, composer & guest conductor Christopher Lennertz, composer & guest conductor Michael Giacchino, composer & guest conductor John Debney, composer & guest conductor John Powell, composer & guest conductor Diego Navarro, guest conductor Cliff Eidelman, guest conductor Joel McNeely, composer & guest conductor Sara Andon, flute soloist Ann Marie Calhoun, violin soloist Robert Townson, host	Second concert celebrating the 35th anniversary of Varèse Sarabande.
June 15, 2013	Music From The Star Wars Universe	Gordy Haab, composer Kyle Newmaster, composer	Third concert celebrating the 35th anniversary of Varèse Sarabande.

== Past seasons ==
2011 - 2012 Season

Date	Concert	Guest artists	Notes	Poster
September 24, 2011	A Spoonful of Sherman: Celebrating the Sherman Brothers	Richard Sherman, guest composer Stu Phillips, arranger Araceli Applegate, vocalist Juliana Hansen, vocalist Jason Livesay, vocalist Stephen Van Dorn, vocalist Don Lucas, vocalist Whitney Kaufman, vocalist	Composer Richard M. Sherman was in attendance and sang It's a Small World (After All) at the piano as the encore.	
October 29, 2011	Halloween Fright Night 9	Lisbeth Scott, vocalist Nathan Barr, guest composer Austin Wintory, guest composer & conductor Alyssa Park, violin Timothy Loo, cello		
December 17, 2011	Holiday Pops Spectacular	The Golden State Pops Holiday Chorale		
February 11, 2012	Cinema Fantastique: Epic Choral Soundtracks	The USC Thornton Concert Choir; Dr. Cristian Grases, guest conductor		
April 14, 2012	Disney in Concert: Tale as Old as Time	Araceli Applegate, vocalist Drew Tablak, vocalist Natalie Taylor, vocalist Stephen Van Dorn, vocalist Chase Masterson, narrator	Premiere performance at the El Segundo Performing Arts Center in El Segundo, CA	
May 19, 2012	Great Composers Tribute: John Williams	Cécilia Tsan, cello, Memoirs of a Geisha		
June 16, 2012	On With the Show: Musicals from the Silver Screen	Susan Egan, vocalist		

2010 - 2011 Season

Date	Concert	Guest artists	Notes	Poster
October 30, 2010	Halloween Fright Night 8	Mark Robertson, violin Jeffrey Schindler, conductor Bonnie Snell Schindler, mezzo soprano	World concert premiere of Concerto to Hell from the film Drag Me to Hell (Composer: Christopher Young)	
December 18, 2010	Holiday Pops Spectacular! 2010	Windy Barnes Farrell, vocalist Araceli Applegate, vocalist The Selah Singers, children's choir		
February 12, 2011	Classical Contrasts	William Stromberg, guest conductor		
April 9, 2011	VideoGame Soundtracks	The Southern California Master Chorale; Gerard Marino, composer & conductor Austin Wintory, composer & conductor Sean Murray, composer Emilie A. Bernstein, orchestrator Russell Brower, composer Laura Karpman, composer Joey Newman, composer Tina Guo, cello & erhu		
May 14, 2011	Disney in Concert: Tale as Old as Time	Araceli Applegate, vocalist Drew Tablak, vocalist Natalie Taylor, vocalist Stephen Van Dorn, vocalist Chase Masterson, narrator	Encore performance from the 2009–2010 season	
May 20 & 22, 2011	Ein Deutsches Requiem, Op. 45	The Southern California Master Chorale		
June 8, 2011	Video Games Live	The Southern California Master Chorale; John Debney, composer & conductor Russell Brower, composer & conductor	Concert took place at the Nokia Theatre as part of the Electronic Entertainment Expo 2011 (E3)	
June 11, 2011	Great Composers: Jerry Goldsmith	Austin Wintory, guest conductor	Carol Goldsmith was in attendance Composer Richard Sherman was in attendance	

2009 - 2010 Season

Date	Concert	Guest artists	Notes	Poster
October 24, 2009	Halloween Fright Night 7	Stu Phillips, composer & conductor Bear McCreary, composer & conductor Robert Thies, piano	Concert in honor of Stu Phillips' 80th birthday Concert also featured: Steve Bartek, guitar; Chris Bleth, duduk & bansuri; & M.B. Gordy, percussion Composer Richard Sherman was in attendance	
December 19, 2009	Holiday Swing	Barbara Morrison, jazz vocalist	Concert featured big band with strings	
February 6, 2010	Great Composers Tribute	Christopher Young, composer John Ottman, composer	World concert premiere of the orchestral music from the film, Avatar	
April 17, 2010	Curtains Up: This is Broadway!	Araceli Applegate, vocalist Caleb Shaw, vocalist Lisa Livesay, vocalist	Concert also featured vocalists Melissa Greilach, Abigail Kinnahan, Jarret Lemaster, Gabriel Oliva, Stephanie Phillips & Drew Tablak	
May 22 & 23, 2010	Disney in Concert: Tale as Old as Time	Araceli Applegate, vocalist Drew Tablak, vocalist Natalie Taylor, vocalist Stephen Van Dorn, vocalist Chase Masterson, narrator	West coast premiere of this show created by the Disney Concert Library; Also featured Madison Logan, child vocalist	
June 17, 2010	Video Games Live	The Southern California Master Chorale	Concert took place at the Nokia Theatre as part of the Electronic Entertainment Expo 2010 (E3)	
July 24, 2010	Video Games Live		Concert took place at the San Diego Civic Theatre as part of Comic-Con 2010	

2008 - 2009 Season

Date	Concert	Guest artists	Notes	Poster
October 2 & 5, 2008	Requiem: Mass in D Minor	The Southern California Master Chorale; The Cypress Masterworks Chorale; Dr. Sheridan Ball, conductor	Mozart's Requiem	
October 25, 2008	Halloween Fright Night 6	William Stromberg, conductor Stu Phillips, conductor	Concert focused on classic horror movie scores Concert also featured George Shaw, composer & conductor and Melissa Kaplan, vocalist Composer Irving Gertz was in attendance	
November 8, 2008	Opera at the Grand	The San Diego Opera Ensemble		
December 20, 2008	Holiday Pops Spectacular	Timothy Gonzales, tenor Grace Lee, soprano		
February 7, 2009	GSPO's Greatest Hits	Timothy Gonzales, tenor Jason Livesay, vocalist	Concert celebrated 5 years as the Warner Grand Theatre's orchestra in residence	
April 18, 2009	Joseph and the Amazing Technicolor Dreamcoat	Nicole Mekenian, Narrator; Jason Livesay, Joseph	A concert production of the musical (only partially staged and choreographed)	
May 16, 2009	Video Game Soundtracks: Loaded...Ready...Play	Wataru Hokoyama, composer & conductor Timothy Michael Wynn, composer & conductor Laura Karpman, composer Gerard Marino, composer Christopher Tin, composer & conductor Christopher Lennertz, composer & conductor Austin Wintory, composer Russell Brower, composer		
June 13, 2009	Great Composers: John Williams	Samuel Fischer, violin		
July 4, 2009	Stars, Stripes and Pops		Concert accompanied the fireworks display on Cabrillo Beach in San Pedro, California	

2007 - 2008 Season

Date	Concert	Guest artists	Notes	Poster
October 27, 2007	Halloween Fright Night 5	Marco Beltrami, composer Melissa Kaplan, soprano The Southern California Master Chorale	Concert featured the world concert premiere of music from the film, Scream with composer Marco Beltrami in attendance	
December 15, 2007	Holiday Pops Spectacular!	The Southern California Master Chorale		
February 9, 2008	Music For Lovers and Other Strangers	Christopher Young, composer Damon Intrabartolo, conductor Timothy Gonzales, tenor		
April 19, 2008	Jason and Nolan: The Electric Violin Twins	Jason Livesay, violinist & vocalist Nolan Livesay, violinist & vocalist		
May 24, 2008	We Remember: A Tribute to Fallen Heroes			
June 14, 2008	Pops for Pop: A Tribute to Fathers	Sam Spence, composer & conductor	Concert featured music from the NFL Films Series, with composer Sam Spence conducting the orchestra	
July 4, 2008	Stars, Stripes and Pops		Concert accompanied the fireworks display on Cabrillo Beach in San Pedro, California	

2006 - 2007 Season

Date	Concert	Guest artists	Notes	Poster
November 4, 2006	Music Legends of the Silver Screen	Damon Intrabartolo, conductor John Ottman, composer	World concert premiere of music from the film Superman Returns by composer John Ottman; Olivia Tiomkin Douglas (widow of film composer Dimitri Tiomkin) was in attendance, as well as film orchestrator Patrick Russ	
December 17, 2006	Holiday Pops Spectacular!	Alistair Tober, vocalist The Sheridan Ball Singers		
February 3, 2007	Video Game Soundtracks	Tommy Tallarico, composer Bob & Barn, composers Jason & Nolan Livesay, composers Melissa Kaplan, soprano Gerard Marino, composer and conductor Christopher Lennertz, composer		
March 10, 2007	Broadway Hits in Concert	Jason Livesay, vocalist Lainie Nelson, vocalist Lisa Shaw, vocalist		
May 5 & August 19, 2007	Come Fly With Me	Alistair Tober, jazz vocalist Barbara Morrison, jazz vocalist	Performances took place at the Warner Grand Theatre in San Pedro, California, and the Ivar Theatre in Hollywood, California	
June 9, 2007	Superheroes and Beyond	John Ottman, composer Damon Intrabartolo, conductor Eric Anderson, piano	World concert premiere of music from the soundtrack to the film Fantastic Four: Rise of the Silver Surfer by composer John Ottman	
July 4, 2007	Stars, Stripes and Pops		Concert accompanied the fireworks display on Cabrillo Beach in San Pedro, California	

2005 - 2006 Season

Date	Concert	Guest artists	Notes	Poster
October 30, 2005	Halloween Fright Night 4	Christopher Young, composer	World concert premiere of music from the film Urban Legend	
December 17, 2005	Holiday Pops Spectacular!	Pat Hurley, narrator & comedian		
January 21, 2006	Warner Grand Does the Decades		A celebration of the Warner Grand Theatre's 75th birthday	
February 4, 2006	Looney Tunes		Concert featured music from cartoons	
March 25, 2006	Jesus Christ Superstar In Concert	J. R. Richards, vocalist Alistair Tober, vocalist	Concert featured Dishwalla lead singer, J.R. Richards as Jesus of Nazareth	
May 20, 2006	Out of this World		Concert featured music from science fiction films	
July 4, 2006	Stars, Stripes and Pops		Concert accompanied the fireworks display on Cabrillo Beach in San Pedro, California	
August 20, 2006	Superheroes and Beyond		Concert took place in Bellflower, California while the Warner Grand Theatre was closed for restorations	

2004 - 2005 Season

Date	Concert	Guest artists	Notes	Poster
October 23, 2004	Halloween Fright Night (3rd Annual)			
December 18, 2004	Holiday Pops Spectacular! 2004			
February 19, 2005	Round Up: Themes of the Old West			
April 9, 2005	Swords, Sandals & Swashbucklers			
May 21, 2005	Star Wars: In Concert		North American concert premiere of Battle of the Heroes from Star Wars: Episode III – Revenge of the Sith	
July 3, 2005	Stars, Stripes and Pops			
August 20, 2005	Broadway's Best			

2003 - 2004 Season

Date	Concert	Guest artists	Notes	Poster
March 15, 2003	St. Pat Goes Pops!		First concert at the Scottish Rite Cathedral in Long Beach, California (The Long Beach Event Center)	
May 3, 2003	Broadway's Best!	Frank Daniele, vocalist		
July 27, 2003	Stars, Stripes and Pops!		Outdoor concert at Concordia University in Irvine, California	
September 6, 2003	Heroes & Villains			
October 25, 2003	Halloween Fright Night (2nd Annual)			
December 20, 2003	Holiday Pops Spectacular! 2003	Chase Masterson, narrator Cypress Masterworks Chorale		
February 7, 2004	Music for Lovers and Other Strangers		First concert at the Warner Grand Theatre in San Pedro, California	
March 20, 2004	And The Winner Is??		Concert featuring music from Academy Award winning films	
April 17, 2004	Worlds Collide	J. R. Richards, lead vocals	Concert with alternative rock band Dishwalla	
April 24, 2004	Follow Me	Frank Daniele, vocalist		
May 15, 2004	Once Upon a Time			
July 3, 2004	Stars, Stripes & Pops			

2002 Season

Date	Concert	Guest artists	Notes	Poster
April 6, 2002	Hooked On Film Scores		First performance of the Golden State pops Orchestra; Concert took place at the Riviera United Methodist Church in Redondo Beach, California	
July 14, 2002	Concerts on the Green	Cory Watkins, vocalist		
October 26, 2002	Halloween Fright Night		Concert took place at the Liberty Performing Arts Center in Los Alamitos, California	
December 7, 2002	GSPO Pops Spectacular! 2002			
