= The Banger Sisters =

2002 film by Bob Dolman

Banger Sisters
- Theatrical release poster
- Directed by: Bob Dolman
- Written by: Bob Dolman
- Produced by: Elizabeth Cantillon; Mark Johnson
- Starring: Goldie Hawn; Susan Sarandon; Geoffrey Rush; Erika Christensen; Robin Thomas
- Cinematography: Karl Walter Lindenlaub
- Edited by: Aram Nigoghossian
- Music by: Trevor Rabin
- Distributed by: Fox Searchlight Pictures
- Release dates: September 8, 2002 (Deauville); September 20, 2002 (United States)
- Running time: 98 minutes
- Country: United States
- Language: English
- Budget: $10 million
- Box office: $38.1 million

The Banger Sisters is a 2002 American comedy drama film written and directed by Bob Dolman, and produced by Fox Searchlight Pictures. The film stars Goldie Hawn as Suzette and Susan Sarandon as Vinnie, two women who were best friends, and famous rock groupies, before they lost touch and went their very separate ways. After being fired, Suzette decides to crash back into her former friend's current, and radically different, conventionally respectable life.

Released on September 20, 2002, the film was Dolman's directorial debut, and Hawn's last film role until the release of Snatched in 2017, fourteen and a half years after the film's release.

== Plot ==
When Suzette is fired from her job as bartender at the Whisky a Go Go in Los Angeles by a younger corporate manager with no time for nostalgia, she feels alone, aware of getting older, and in need of money, so on a whim sets out for Phoenix, Arizona to see former best friend, Vinnie. Stranded at a service station without money to buy gasoline, Suzette picks up neurotic, agoraphobic, middle-aged writer Harry Plummer, heading to Phoenix to permanently deal with his father's negative influence over his life, and willing to pay for gas along the way.

On arrival in Phoenix, Suzette has a chance encounter with Vinnie's 17-year-old elder daughter Hannah, who she finds collapsed and abandoned by her friends after a bad experience with LSD. Suzette brings her to Harry's hotel room and cares for her, as Hannah starts throwing up. In the morning Suzette drives Hannah back to her parents' elegant suburban home, with a cover-story about the teenager having become ill after mixing red and white wine the previous night. But Suzette is shocked by what she sees, Vinnie - now Lavinia Kingsley - appears to be a radically different character from the one she knew 20 years ago; now with a conservative respectable lifestyle, portraying the conventionally "perfect" wife and mother—a role which prompts Vinnie's younger daughter Ginger to ask Suzette, "Did she ever do anything wrong?". Raymond, Vinnie's lawyer husband and aspiring politician, is also unaware about his wife's wilder past.

Initially horrified by Suzette's sudden appearance, even attempting to bribe her to leave quietly, Lavinia starts to reminisce with Suzette, and warm to her presence. Lavinia cuts her hair and casts off her expensive but boring clothes and, just for one night, relives the 'old days' by going dancing with Suzette. They return to Vinnie's home, and down in the basement she retrieves some memorabilia of their previous life, including a collection of Polaroids of the penises of numerous "musicians and a few roadies". They share a marijuana joint, which inadvertently sets off the smoke detector, waking up the household.

Ginger has a minor car accident, with everyone gathering at the hospital. Vinnie has an identity crisis during a family argument, where Hannah blames Suzette for disrupting their lives. Suzette leaves and calls Harry telling him she's going back to Los Angeles. Vinnie follows Suzette and they have a heart to heart that ends up with them sitting atop a "Got Milk?" billboard sign to watch the sunrise.

The pair go to the hotel room to find Harry has left. Suzette fears the worst as Harry has taken a gun with him. They find Harry going to see his father - deceased in a cemetery. While Suzette tries to talk sense into Harry, Vinnie loses her patience and bumps into him with the car. Suzette takes the gun and shoots the single bullet into the air. Harry finally comes to grips with his dead, absentee father.

In the end, both Lavinia's husband and her two daughters have understood that she is only human after all. In her graduation speech, Hannah speaks out against anything that is "fake" and urges her schoolmates, teachers and the parents present to "do it true".

The following day, Suzette returns to Los Angeles together with Harry, who has come to consider her as his muse.

== Cast ==
- Goldie Hawn as Suzette
- Susan Sarandon as Lavinia "Vinnie" Kingsley
- Geoffrey Rush as Harry Plummer
- Erika Christensen as Hannah Kingsley
- Robin Thomas as Raymond Kingsley
- Eva Amurri as Ginger Kingsley
- Matthew Carey as Jules
- Andre Ware as Jake the Bartender
- Adam Tomei as Club Owner
- Sal Lopez as Pump Attendant
- Kohl Sudduth as Hotel Clerk
- Tinsley Grimes as Prom Girl
- Larry Krask as Man in Bar
- Marlayna Garrett as Young Groupie
- Buckcherry as Themselves

== Reception ==
The film was released on September 20, 2002. It opened at #2, in 2,738 theaters (setting a record as Fox Searchlight's largest-ever theatrical release, which it would hold until their release of Ready or Not in 2019 at 2,820 theaters), grossing $10,037,846 during its opening weekend. It went on to gross $30,307,416 domestically and $7,760,937 from international markets, for a worldwide total of $38,068,353.

=== Critical response ===
On Rotten Tomatoes, the film has an approval rating of 48% based on reviews from 143 critics. The site's consensus states: "Hawn and Sarandon are terrific together, but the hoary plot is predictable and contrived." On Metacritic, the film has a score of 48% based on reviews from 33 critics, indicating "mixed or average reviews". Audiences surveyed by CinemaScore gave the film a grade "B+" on scale of A to F.

Roger Ebert of the Chicago Sun-Times gave it three out of four stars, calling it "Pretty thin, but you grin while you're watching it."

Hawn received a nomination for Best Actress in a Motion Picture – Musical or Comedy at the 60th Golden Globe Awards.

== Soundtrack ==
The Banger Sisters Original Motion Picture Soundtrack

Soundtrack album by Various Artists
- Released: September 10, 2002
- Genre: Soundtrack
- Length: 53:10
- Label: Sanctuary Records
- Producers: Chris Farren; Ken Levitan

No.	Title	Writer(s)	Artist	Length
1.	"The Red Road"	Chris Robinson	Chris Robinson	5:35
2.	"Fame 02"	Carlos Alomar; David Bowie; John Lennon	Tommy Lee	3:39
3.	"Home"	Scott Alexander; Rodney Browning Cravens; Pete Maloney; John Robert Richards; Jim Wood	Dishwalla	4:46
4.	"Burning Down the House"	David Byrne; Chris Frantz; Jerry Harrison; Tina Weymouth	Talking Heads	3:59
5.	"One Last Goodbye"	Blair Daly; Chris Farren; Richie Sambora; Gordie Sampson	Richie Sambora	4:57
6.	"Don't Let Me Be Misunderstood"	Bennie Benjamin; Horace Ott credited as Gloria Caldwell; Sol Marcus	Trevor Rabin	4:08
7.	"Doctor, My Eyes"	Jackson Browne	Ben Folds	3:11
8.	"Hour Of Need"	Peter Frampton; Gordon Kennedy; Wayne Kirkpatrick	Peter Frampton	5:19
9.	"Trippin'"	John Paul Lourence; Jon Sexton	JP (John Paul Lourence)	3:33
10.	"Child Of Mine"	Roger Daltrey; Gerard McMahon	Roger Daltrey featuring G Tom Mac	4:01
11.	"Crushed"	Keith Nelson; Josh Todd	Buckcherry	3:40
12.	"Burn Out"	Chris Slack; Nick Slack; Ben Slack	Slack	2:38
13.	"Rock Me"	John Kay	Steppenwolf	3:44
Total length:				53:10
