= How to Eat Fried Worms (film) =

2006 comedy film directed by Bob Dolman

- Theatrical release poster
- Directed by: Bob Dolman
- Screenplay by: Bob Dolman
- Based on: How to Eat Fried Worms by Thomas Rockwell
- Produced by: Mark Johnson; Philip Steuer
- Starring: James Rebhorn; Kimberly Williams-Paisley; Tom Cavanagh
- Cinematography: Richard Rutkowski
- Edited by: Janice Hampton; Frederick Wardell
- Music by: Mark Mothersbaugh; Bob Mothersbaugh
- Production company: Walden Media
- Distributed by: New Line Cinema
- Release date: August 25, 2006
- Running time: 84 minutes
- Country: United States
- Language: English
- Box office: $13.1 million

How to Eat Fried Worms is a 2006 American children’s comedy film written and directed by Bob Dolman. It was produced by Mark Johnson and Philip Steuer, with music by Mark and Bob Mothersbaugh of Devo. The film is loosely based on Thomas Rockwell's 1973 children's book of the same name. It stars James Rebhorn, Kimberly Williams-Paisley, and Tom Cavanagh. The film was produced by Walden Media and distributed by New Line Cinema.

Development began in 1998, and the theatrical release for the United States and Canada was August 25, 2006. The film received mixed reviews from critics.

== Plot ==
11-year-old Billy Forrester, who has a weak stomach and vomits easily, moves to a new town with his parents, Mitch and Helen, and his five-year-old brother, Woody. Billy is concerned about going to school because he will be "the new kid"; his mother assures him that he will make friends and everything will be okay.

Billy becomes the target of the school bully, Joe Guire, his two "toaders" Plug and Bradley, and the rest of his gang: Benjy, Techno-Mouth, Twitch, and Donny. Plug and Bradley steal Billy's lunch box. Billy sits behind Erika "Erk" Tansy, an unusually tall girl whom people make fun of.

At lunch, Billy opens his thermos and pours out a pile of live earthworms. Sickened, he almost vomits. Joe asks Billy if he eats worms. Billy says, "I eat them all the time", then throws a worm at Joe's face. A nerd named Adam Simms worries that Joe will punch Billy with "The Death Ring"; it is rumored that whoever Joe punches with the ring dies in the eighth grade.

Joe, Plug, and Benjy catch up with Billy as he heads home. Joe proposes a bet: Billy has to eat ten worms on the coming Saturday without throwing up, or he will have to walk around the school with worms in his pants. Billy accepts, knowing that he cannot back out.

The next day, Billy is teamed up with Adam. While the boys cook the first worm "Le Big Porker" in the park they are chased by a park ranger for using a grill without adult supervision. Adam then takes them to his uncle Ed's restaurant, The Brown Toad, and cooks up the second worm in an omelet. However, Ed takes the omelet and serves it to a customer, who then eats it. Adam then has to cook the second and third worms again, dubbing the creation "The Greasy Brown Toad Bloater Special" (where he dunks the worms in the fryer and smears liver juice on them). When Ed discovers the worms, he kicks the boys out of his restaurant. After Billy eats the fourth worm, "The Burning Fireball", and burns his mouth, Twitch and Techno-Mouth quit Joe's team and become his new best friends. Billy, Techno-Mouth, Twitch, and Adam then go to a convenience store. They find Adam playing Dance Dance Revolution, and one of the boys spills his drink, causing the machine to blow up and they get kicked out. At the playground, Billy eats the next three worms, "Magni-Fried", "Barfmallo", and "Peanut Butter and Worm Jam Sandwich".

After dinner, the boys go to a bait shop, where Billy eats the next two worms, "The Green Slusher" and "Radioactive Slime Delight" (where Donny puts the worm in the microwave), while the owner is out, but her unexpected return leads to her chasing them away. Erk is able to use her archery skills to get the final worm needed to Billy. After Joe cheats in an attempt to keep Billy from eating the last worm, "Worm A La Mud", by throwing into a brook, Joe's gang turns on him and encourages Billy to go after it. Billy manages to do so and eats it before the deadline. Nigel Guire, Joe's 14-year-old brother, tries to bully and humiliate Joe; Billy and the rest of the gang stand up for him, telling Nigel to leave him alone, and Nigel leaves.

After thinking it over that night, Billy returns to school. He tells Joe that the second worm was eaten by their principal, Mr. Burdock, when Adam accidentally put it in his omelet at the Brown Toad. Billy and Joe come to the conclusion that neither of them technically won, so they both put a bunch of worms down their pants and walk through the hallway. Billy and Joe are then interrupted by Burdock, who nearly catches them when a worm falls out of Billy's pants, which Joe covers up with his shoe. After Burdock returns to his office, the children all run outside and celebrate as Billy and Joe both take the worms out of their pants and throw them into the air.

== Cast ==
- Luke Benward as Billy "Wormboy" Forrester
- Hallie Kate Eisenberg as Erika "Erk" Tansy
- Adam Hicks as Joe Guire
- Tom Cavanagh as Mitch Forrester, Billy's father
- Kimberly Williams-Paisley as Helen Forrester, Billy's mother
- Austin Rogers as Adam Simms
- Alexander Gould as Twitch
- Ryan Malgarini as Benjamin "Benjy" Renfro
- Philip Daniel Bolden as Bradley
- Clint Howard as Uncle Ed Simms, Adam's paternal uncle
- Ty Panitz as Woody Forrester, Billy's younger brother
- James Rebhorn as Principal Nelson "Boilerhead" Burdock
- Andrew Gillingham as Techno Mouth
- Blake Garrett as Plug
- Alexander Agate as Donny
- Nick Krause as Nigel Guire, Joe's older brother
- Andrea Martin as Mrs. Bommley
- David Bewley as Rob Simon
- Karen Wacker as Mrs. Simon
- Simone White as Woody's teacher
- Jo Ann Farabee as Bait Shop Lady
- Tom Brainard as Security Guard
- Tim Mateer as Convenience Store Clerk

== Production ==
The film began development in 1996 after film rights were acquired by Imagine Entertainment. John August was hired to write the screenplay in his first paid screenwriting job and Thomas Schlamme was attached to direct. They went through four different drafts but neither August nor Schlamme had really connected with each other. Eventually, Bob Dolman was brought on for rewrites. Universal Pictures put the film in turnaround, and Nickelodeon Movies bought the film from them. Schlamme was later replaced with Joe Nussbaum. Eventually, Nickelodeon Movies dropped the film and it remained in development hell until Walden Media came in to finance and produce the film. New Line Cinema entered as distributor and Dolman decided to direct his own script. Shooting began in July 2005.

August chose not to acquire a screenwriting credit via WGA rules, as very little of his initial screenplay remained in the finalized product.

== Differences from the book ==
Though the film and the book share the concept about a bet between boys to eat earthworms, the nature of the situation differs significantly. In the book, the characters consist of four boys who are friends hanging around during the summertime. Billy has to eat fifteen worms in fifteen days, and the terms of the bet are fifty dollars, which he intends to use to buy a dirt bike.

Many of the film's subplots, that he is new in school, that Joe is a bully, that Billy has a weak stomach, and that Joe threatens him with a Death Ring, do not appear in the book. Unlike in the film, his parents eventually find out about the bet, which he ultimately wins instead of tying. All the worms he eats in the book are nightcrawlers, and Erika, the girl who helps him in the film, is not introduced until the book's sequel, How to Fight a Girl.

== Reception ==
=== Box office ===
The film debuted at #11, with $4,003,537 in the United States and Canada. It closed seven weeks later, with a total of $13,040,527 domestically, and $55,787 overseas, for a worldwide total of $13,096,314.

=== Critical reception ===
How to Eat Fried Worms mostly received mixed-to-positive reviews. On the review aggregator website Rotten Tomatoes, 60% of 75 critics' reviews are positive, with an average rating of 6.1/10. The website's consensus reads: "This Fear Factor for kids is good-natured and tasty enough." Metacritic, which uses a weighted average, assigned the film a score of 56 out of 100, based on 23 critics, indicating "mixed or average" reviews.

The Filthy Critic gave the film four out of five "fingers" for its realistic portrayal of how children act. ReelViews' James Berardinelli gave a mildly positive review (2 1/2 stars out of 4) but thought the potential audience too narrow: "It's aimed at pre-teen males and doesn't make many concessions to members of other demographics." He went on to say that "How to Eat Fried Worms belongs to a vanishing breed – live action family films. Even the best of the genre (like Holes and The Sisterhood of the Traveling Pants) don't draw large audiences, so mediocre productions like this one face an uphill struggle." The Boston Globe's reviewer – Ty Burr – gave it a 2 stars out of 4 and said when comparing the book to the film:

There's a kid named Billy, and he eats worms on a dare, and that's about all the movie has in common with its source. Truth to tell, that's all the movie needs to have in common with its source. "This is really disgusting," my 9-year-old's friend whispered to her during the screening. Then he added, "But I like it."
From a parent's viewpoint, two feet higher off the ground, How to Eat Fried Worms is lackadaisical stuff, easily the least of the unpretentious children's book adaptations produced by family-oriented Walden Media (Because of Winn-Dixie, Hoot, Holes).

Tasha Robinson of The A.V. Club wrote in her review: "There's no great art to Fried Worms' simple, family-friendly style and obvious clichés, but there's a refreshing lack of x-treme attitude, slapstick violence, and all the other things that make most kids' movies feel like they were generated by a marketing committee." Lael Loewenstein of Variety wrote in her review: "A decidedly old-fashioned family film that may prove too quaint for modern audiences." Toddy Burton of The Austin Chronicle wrote in his review: "The sweetness of spirit and rapidly moving story will keep parents entertained while blessing the kids with a mildly raunchy good time." Manohla Dargis of The New York Times wrote in her review: "Nicely directed, the film version proves refreshingly free of the customary blights that affect most modern children's movies, notably adult condescension. But, man, is it mean."

=== Home media release ===
How to Eat Fried Worms was released on DVD by New Line Home Entertainment on December 5, 2006.

== Accolades ==
At the 28th Young Artist Awards in 2007, How to Eat Fried Worms received three nominations, winning one:

- Won – Best Performance in a Feature Film – Young Ensemble Cast – Luke Benward, Hallie Eisenberg, Alexander Gould, Adam Hicks, Ryan Malgarini, Ty Panitz, Philip Daniel Bolden, Blake Garrett, Andrew Gillingham, Austin Rogers, Nick Krause and Alexander Agate
- Nominated – Best Family Feature Film (Comedy or Musical)
- Nominated – Best Performance in a Feature Film – Supporting Young Actress – Hallie Eisenberg

== Soundtrack ==
- "The Tide Is High" – Performed by Matthew Sweet
- "Gone" – Performed by All Too Much
- "Baby Beluga" – Performed by Ty Panitz
- "Human Hands" – Written and Performed by Joe Mannix, Chris Peck, Bob Bruchu and Ed Fingerling
- "Get Ready for This" – Performed by 2 Unlimited
- "3 Little Bird" – Performed by Hallie Kate Eisenberg and Ty Panitz
- "Rocket Full of Power" – Performed by The Wipeouters
- "Move Your Feet" – Performed by Junior Senior
- "Jungle Boogie" – Performed by Kool & The Gang
- "Yum Yum Yum" – Performed by Mark Mothersbaugh, Bob Mothersbaugh and Bob Casale
