= Pet Your Friends =

Studio album by Dishwalla
- Released: August 22, 1995
- Recorded: April – September 1994
- Genre: Alternative rock
- Length: 49:21
- Label: A&M
- Producers: Phil Nicolo; Dishwalla

Dishwalla chronology
Pet Your Friends (1995)	And You Think You Know What Life's About (1998)

Singles from Pet Your Friends
- 1. "Haze" Released: 1995; 2. "Counting Blue Cars" Released: February 27, 1996; 3. "Charlie Brown's Parents" Released: 1996; 4. "Give" Released: 1996

Pet Your Friends is the debut studio album by the American alternative rock band Dishwalla. It was released in 1995 through A&M Records. The album included the hit single "Counting Blue Cars".

== Background ==
Dishwalla's roots traced back to the early 1990s via the synthpop band Life Talking, which consisted of vocalist J.R. Richards, guitarist Rodney Browning, and keyboardist Greg Kolanek. Bassist Scot Alexander and drummer George Pendergast were added to the lineup when their name changed to Dish. After releasing a self-titled demo tape in 1993, the band changed their name to Dishwalla.

On the strength of their demo tape, Dishwalla signed with the major label A&M Records. They made their first commercialized appearance on the compilation cover album If I Were a Carpenter in 1994, contributing a cover of "It's Going to Take Some Time" along with producer Matt Wallace. Around the same time, Kolanek departed from the band for unknown reasons (although he was still credited as a songwriter on various tracks afterwards). His position was not refilled at that point, although Jim Wood was eventually brought in as the band's keyboardist.

By the end of 1994, Dishwalla had finished recording their debut album, Pet Your Friends, with producer Phil Nicolo. The image used for the cover of the album was taken from the August 23, 1948, Life magazine cover. The cover story talked about a 16-year-old girl who befriended her friend's pet deer (nicknamed Bucky) while swimming one day. At the time, the picture gained prominence in the Santa Rosa region. Shortly after the picture was taken, the girl (Jone Pedersen) had won the 1948 Miss California contest. The track listing featured 11 songs, along with the hidden bonus track "Date With Sarah". On certain non-American editions, both "Date With Sarah" and "It's Going to Take Some Time" were included as separate bonus tracks.

Pet Your Friends was released in 1995, with "Haze" as the first single. It did not chart and went largely unnoticed; however, the second single, "Counting Blue Cars", became a hit on both Top 40 and rock radio. The follow-up singles, "Charlie Brown's Parents" and "Give", also charted in the US. Ultimately, Pet Your Friends would be certified gold by the RIAA while "Counting Blue Cars" would win ASCAP's "Rock Track of the Year" award two years in a row.

== Critical reception ==
Professional ratings
Review scores
Source	Rating
AllMusic	3/5 stars

The Chicago Tribune noted that, "individually, the songs on the quartet's Pet Your Friends CD make for passable radio ditties, but as a whole they amount to a rock-by-numbers sleepwalk." Bass Player praised the "well-written alterna-pop tunes."

== Track listing ==
All tracks are written by Dishwalla (J.R. Richards, Rodney Browning, Scot Alexander, George Pendergast), except where noted.

No.	Title	Writer(s)	Length
1.	"Pretty Babies"	Dishwalla, Greg Kolanek	5:30
2.	"Haze"		4:21
3.	"Counting Blue Cars (Tell Me Your Thoughts on God)"	Dishwalla, Kolanek	4:51
4.	"Explode"		3:02
5.	"Charlie Brown's Parents"	Dishwalla, Kolanek	5:15
6.	"Give"		5:25
7.	"Miss Emma Peel"		4:06
8.	"Moisture"	Dishwalla, Kolanek	5:23
9.	"The Feeder"		3:58
10.	"All She Can See"	Dishwalla, Kolanek	3:45
11.	"Only for So Long"	Dishwalla, David Young	2:58
Total length:			49:21

UK bonus tracks
No.	Title	Writer(s)	Length
12.	"Date With Sarah"		4:27
13.	"It's Going to Take Some Time" (The Carpenters cover)	Carole King, Toni Stern	4:17

== Personnel ==
Dishwalla

- J.R. Richards – lead vocals, keyboards, piano, organ
- Rodney Browning – guitar, backing vocals
- Scot Alexander – bass guitar, backing vocals, tabla, bells
- George Pendergast – drums, percussion, backing vocals

Additional personnel

- Greg Kolanek – keyboards on "It's Going to Take Some Time"
- Ian Cross – assistant engineer
- Andy Kravitz – programming, additional production, engineer
- Bob Ludwig – mastering
- Phil Nicolo – programming, producer, engineer, mixing
- David Young – executive producer
- Dishwalla – programming, producer
- Eric Flickinger – assistant engineer
- Michael Lavine – photography
- Dirk Grobelny – engineer
- Mark Mazzetti – executive producer, A&R
- Sunja Park – art direction
- Tulio Torrinello, Jr. – assistant engineer
- Jone Pedersen – cover model
- Jon Brenneis – photography

== Chart positions ==
Chart (1996)	Peak position
Billboard 200 (US)	89
Top Heatseekers (US)	1

=== Singles ===
Year	Title	Chart	Position
1996	"Counting Blue Cars"	Billboard Hot 100 (US)	15
1996	"Counting Blue Cars"	Mainstream Rock Tracks (US)	2
1996	"Counting Blue Cars"	Alternative Songs (US)	1
1996	"Counting Blue Cars"	Adult Pop Songs (US)	5
1996	"Counting Blue Cars"	Pop Songs (US)	4
1996	"Charlie Brown's Parents"	Mainstream Rock Tracks (US)	24
1997	"Give"	Adult Pop Songs (US)	26

== Certifications ==
Region	Certification	Certified units/sales
United States (RIAA)	Gold	500,000^{^}
^{^} Shipments figures based on certification alone.
