= Bob Dolman =

Canadian screenwriter, actor, director and producer

Robert Dolman (born April 5, 1949) is a Canadian screenwriter, actor, director, producer, painter, and poet based in California.

His work in television includes SCTV, SCTV Network 90, and WKRP in Cincinnati. Among his film credits are the screenplays for Willow and Far and Away, as well as The Banger Sisters and How to Eat Fried Worms, both of which he also directed. He is a writer and producer on the 2022 Disney+ Willow TV series, returning to the franchise that he helped to co-create.

Dolman was married at one time to actress Andrea Martin, with whom he has two sons as well as a grandchild. His sister, Nancy Dolman, was also an actress, as well as the wife of comedian and actor Martin Short. His son Jack Dolman is an Academy Award-nominated sound editor and music editor.

== Filmography ==
Television

- WKRP In Cincinnati (1981)
- Little Shots (1983)
- SCTV Network 90 (1981–1983)
- SCTV (1983–1984)
- Cowboy Joe (1987) (also Executive Producer)
- Willow (2022)

Film

- Willow (1988)
- Far and Away (1992)
- The Banger Sisters (2002) (also Director)
- How to Eat Fried Worms (2006) (also Director & Producer)
- Out of Brooklyn (2010) (also Director & Producer)
