= Counting Blue Cars =

1996 single by Dishwalla

Single by Dishwalla

from the album Pet Your Friends
- B-side: "The Other Side of the World"; "Until I Wake Up"; "Date with Sarah" (instrumental); "Sarah Without Sarah"
- Released: February 27, 1996
- Genre: Alternative rock
- Length: 4:51
- Label: A&M
- Songwriters: Scot Alexander; Rodney Browning Cravens; Greg Kolanek; J. R. Richards; George Pendergast
- Producers: Phil Nicolo; Dishwalla

Dishwalla singles chronology
"Haze" (1996)	"Counting Blue Cars" (1996)	"Charlie Brown's Parents" (1998)

Music video
- "Counting Blue Cars" on YouTube

"Counting Blue Cars (Tell Me Your Thoughts on God)" is a song by American alternative rock band Dishwalla from their debut studio album, Pet Your Friends (1995). It is their only hit song, peaking at number 15 on the US Billboard Hot 100 and topping the Billboard Modern Rock Tracks chart. On the Billboard Mainstream Rock Tracks chart, despite peaking at number two, "Counting Blue Cars" was the ranking's most successful song of 1996. It received two ASCAP awards (1997 and 1998) as the most-played song of the year on radio in the United States.

== Writing and inspiration ==
Dishwalla lead singer J. R. Richards wrote 'Counting Blue Cars' "rather quickly", telling the "story of a young boy's spiritual journey". He said the lyrics are about a conversation with the child within himself, but was inspired by an actual chat with his 10-year-old neighbor. Richards said:

From that younger perspective, I think we take things in a much more honest way because we are not being biased by how we're supposed to all think the same. So this idea of God, being an omnipotent being, could be a male or female. We always refer to God as a male, so why not make it a female? I started creating imagery to describe this journey, trying to think about what it was like to be a kid and the things that you would do. It quickly came together—I didn't think too much about it. But it did end up being one of the songs that really affected people both positively and negatively. I never thought I'd ever have a song I'd get death threats for writing.

As quoted, Richards received death threats after the single's release from listeners who were upset about God's depiction as a female in the song.

== Chart performance ==
"Counting Blue Cars" was highly popular on the radio, peaking at number four on pop airplay and number five on Hot AC airplay in 1996. It became a number-one Modern Rock Track for one week in June 1996 and a number two Mainstream Rock Track. It peaked at number 15 on the Billboard Hot 100 and showed longevity by remaining on the chart for nearly a year at 48 weeks. In March 2022, the song received a gold certification from the Recording Industry Association of America (RIAA) for digital sales and streams of over 500,000 units.

== Track listings and formats ==
- US CD and cassette single
1. "Counting Blue Cars" (LP version) – 4:51
2. "The Other Side of the World" – 3:46
- European CD and UK 7-inch single
1. "Counting Blue Cars" (edit) – 4:20
2. "Counting Blue Cars" (acoustic live edit) – 4:32
- US and European maxi-CD single
1. "Counting Blue Cars" (edit) – 4:20
2. "Until I Wake Up" – 4:42
3. "Counting Blue Cars" (acoustic live edit) – 4:32
4. "Date with Sarah" (instrumental) – 3:51
- US CD 1 and German maxi-CD single
1. "Counting Blue Cars (Tell Me All Your Thoughts on God)" (edit) – 4:20
2. "Until I Wake Up" – 4:42
3. "Sarah Without Sarah" – 3:51
4. "Counting Blue Cars (Tell Me All Your Thoughts on God)" (LP version) – 4:51
- US CD 2
1. "Counting Blue Cars" (LP version) – 4:51
2. "The Other Side of the World" – 3:46
3. "Counting Blue Cars" (acoustic) – 5:39
4. "Until I Wake Up" – 4:42
- Japanese EP
1. "Counting Blue Cars" – 4:20
2. "Until I Wake Up" – 4:42
3. "It's Going to Take Some Time" – 4:42
4. "Date with Sarah" – 3:51
5. "Charlie Brown's Parents" – 4:51
6. "The Other Side of the World" – 3:51
7. "The Feeder" – 4:51
8. "Counting Blue Cars" (acoustic) – 4:20

== Charts ==
=== Weekly charts ===
Chart (1996)	Peak position
Canada Top Singles (RPM)	16
Canada Rock/Alternative (RPM)	5
US Billboard Hot 100	15
US Adult Top 40 (Billboard)	5
US Mainstream Rock Tracks (Billboard)	2
US Modern Rock Tracks (Billboard)	1
US Top 40/Mainstream (Billboard)	4
US Triple-A (Billboard)	9
US Cash Box Top 100	13

=== Year-end charts ===
Chart (1996)	Position
US Billboard Hot 100	28
US Adult Top 40 (Billboard)	24
US Mainstream Rock Tracks (Billboard)	1
US Modern Rock Tracks (Billboard)	3
US Top 40/Mainstream (Billboard)	21
US Triple-A (Billboard)	24

== Certifications ==
Region	Certification	Certified units/sales
United States (RIAA)	Gold	500,000^{‡}
^{‡} Sales+streaming figures based on certification alone.

== Release history ==
Region	Date	Format(s)	Label(s)	Ref.
United States	February 27, 1996	CD	A&M	
United States	April 9, 1996	Contemporary hit radio	A&M	
Japan	December 9, 1996	CD	A&M	
