= Tripdavon =

American rock band

- Origin: Santa Barbara, California, United States
- Genres: Rock; Alternative rock College rock
- Years active: 2004–2012
- Labels: Oxygen Recording (2004-2010); Ripple Music (2010-2012)
- Members: Justin Fox; Greg Doscher; Dave Heer; Russ Cummings; Adam Coons
- Website: www.tripdavon.com

Tripdavon is an American rock band from Santa Barbara, California. The group formed in early 2004 while students at UCSB by vocalist Justin Fox, guitarist Greg Doscher, guitarist Adam Coons, drummer Russ Cummings, and bassist Dave Heer.

== History ==
=== Early days (2004-2006) ===
Tripdavon originally flourished in Isla Vista, where throngs of wandering revelers allow for a greater variety of musical acts. The band’s first gig had them performing at an apartment complex on Del Playa Drive for 400 I.V. partiers. They called it 25-a-Palooza. “In I.V., you have a captive audience,” guitarist Greg Doscher said. “We had people lying on their roof and listening to our first gig. It was great…. The kind of energy you find in IV — you just can’t match that anywhere else.”

Tripdavon debut album
In late 2004, Tripdavon released their self-titled debut album to broad acclaim. Shortly after graduating UCSB, the band moved into a house together in Santa Barbara, where they spent the summer months recording and self-producing the songs that would eventually land on the debut release.

First world tour
In 2005 Tripdavon landed a gig to play at Eric Burdon’s 2005 CD release party at the Viper Room in Los Angeles. When the gig fell through, Burdon summoned the band as support for his My Secret Life world tour. The guys found themselves riding a tour bus across Germany, Austria, the Netherlands, and Hungary with Eric Burdon and The Animals. They were playing to packed venues, and enjoying the greatest exposure their band had gotten to date. Doscher said the experience on the road helped to bond the members of Tripdavon with Burdon, an industry-savvy rocker best known for hits like "House of the Rising Sun", “Don't Let Me Be Misunderstood” and “Spill the Wine”. By the end of the tour, Eric regularly invited the band up on stage for his encores playing songs like “Ring of Fire” before throngs of European fans. "He had enough respect for us to let us play on stage with him.” Vocalist Justin Fox said. The experience with Burdon proved a pivotal event for Tripdavon. “It was a life-changing experience. It’s something I never thought I would get to do in my life,” he said.

=== The Enlightened Operative (2006-2008) ===
Tripdavon's second full-length album titled The Enlightened Operative was released on November 14, 2006.

Upon returning home from their time on the road with Burdon, Tripdavon migrated up north, to the quiet streets of Weed, California. There they worked with veteran rocker Jim Wood from Dishwalla and legendary producer, Sylvia Massy Shivy, whose credits include platinum albums from Tool, Red Hot Chili Peppers, and System of a Down. The Project was recorded over 40 days in June and July at Radiostar Studios, Massy's multimedia recording complex (which occupies a full city block in the heart of town). The outcome: what the guys estimate is their most mature sound yet. They've got nothing but gratitude for Massey’s influence over the project. “A good thing about Sylvia is that she has this strong engineering background… She has a zen-like mastery when it comes to recording,” Fox said. “She’ll want a certain sound and she’ll know how to get it.” “In my opinion, we developed a more cohesive sound,” Doscher said. “[Massey] had concept of how the album would come together — how it would flow and how the songs belonged together.” Fox agreed, “The production was amazing. When we first heard the mixes, we were like, ‘Wow, I can’t believe this is us.’” The guys count the recording experience as a good one.

=== Present day ===
Tripdavon has spent the first half of 2009 in production of their third studio album. Slated to release in the summer of 2009, many details of the project are not known.

== Discography ==
=== Studio albums ===
2004: Tripdavon - Self-titled debut
2006: The Enlightened Operative
2009: Sketches From Silence

=== "Digital only" releases ===
2005: "Valentine's Day" - Single
2007: "St. James Infirmary" - Single
2008: Live at the Royal Albert Hall - Bootleg

== Featured events ==
Their self-titled debut reached number twelve on the UK Albums Chart. In June 2007 they were featured on HBO's hit series: Entourage. In August 2007, they won the famecast.com competition to become Season 2 "Rock Fenoms".

In April 2008 they opened for the 37 year reunion of Eric Burdon & War at Royal Albert Hall, London.
