= Arvada High School =

American high school in Colorado

Location
- 7951 W. 65th Ave. Arvada, Colorado 80004; United States; 39°48′57″N 105°05′06″W

Information
- Type: Public secondary school
- Established: 1900 (126 years ago)
- School district: Jefferson County Public Schools (Colorado)
- CEEB code: 60055
- Principal: Caroline Frazee
- Staff: 40.41 (FTE)
- Grades: 9-12
- Enrollment: 722 (2023-2024)
- Student to teacher ratio: 17.87
- Colours: Red and white
- Athletics: 2A
- Athletics conference: Jefferson County
- Mascot: Bulldog
- Teams: Reds
- Newspaper: The Crimson Report
- Yearbook: The Arvadan
- Feeder schools: North Arvada Middle School
- Website: arvada.jeffcopublicschools.org

Arvada High School is a public secondary school operated by Jefferson County School District R-1 in Arvada, Colorado, United States.

== Demographics ==
Arvada High's student body has the following racial demographics:

Race	Percentage
Hispanic	58.3%
White	31.5%
African American	3.4%
Asian	2.0%
Native American	0.9%
Pacific Islander	0.4%
Two or More Races	3.5%

== History ==
The first high school classes in Arvada commenced in 1900 at Zephyr and Grandview. Known as the Arvada School (it was renamed Lawrence Elementary School in 1955), local high school students attended classes there until a permanent high school was built in 1920. The first Arvada High School was located at 7225 Ralston Road and served students until 1955. The building served as a junior high school until 1984 and was demolished in 1986. A new building at 5751 Balsam Street served students until 1971, when the school's current building was completed at 7951 W. 65th Avenue and the Balsam Street location became Arvada Junior High School.

In the early 1920s, the school adopted the team name "Redskins". This was challenged in 1993 as derogatory and the new name "Reds" was adopted by a 2–1 margin in voting. The school subsequently adopted a bulldog as its new mascot.

== Curriculum ==
Since 2006, Arvada High School has been home to the district's North Area Option School, a rigorous college preparatory program. Many Advanced Placement classes are also available. Program classes are taught by Arvada High School instructors and 50% of the available enrollment is for Arvada High students.

== Extracurricular activities ==
Arvada High School fields teams in interscholastic competition in football, baseball, basketball, cross country, golf, soccer, softball, swimming, diving, tennis, track and field, volleyball and wrestling.

The school's percussion ensemble was the winner of the WGI World Percussion Championships in 1998).

== Patrick Surtain II Foundation ==
On September 9, 2025 Denver Broncos player Patrick Surtain II unveiled his foundation’s third “Inspiration Room” a program run by his foundation working towards helping lower class schools have programs equal to higher class schools. This room opened up with technology donated from Lutheran Hospital and is the home of the schools’s pathophysiology class, taught by David Feeney. On the day the school welcomed in the Broncos player with a whole school event, one student being able to personally interview Surtain. This event will be the focus of one of the stories of Vol I Issue II of “The Bulldog Times.”

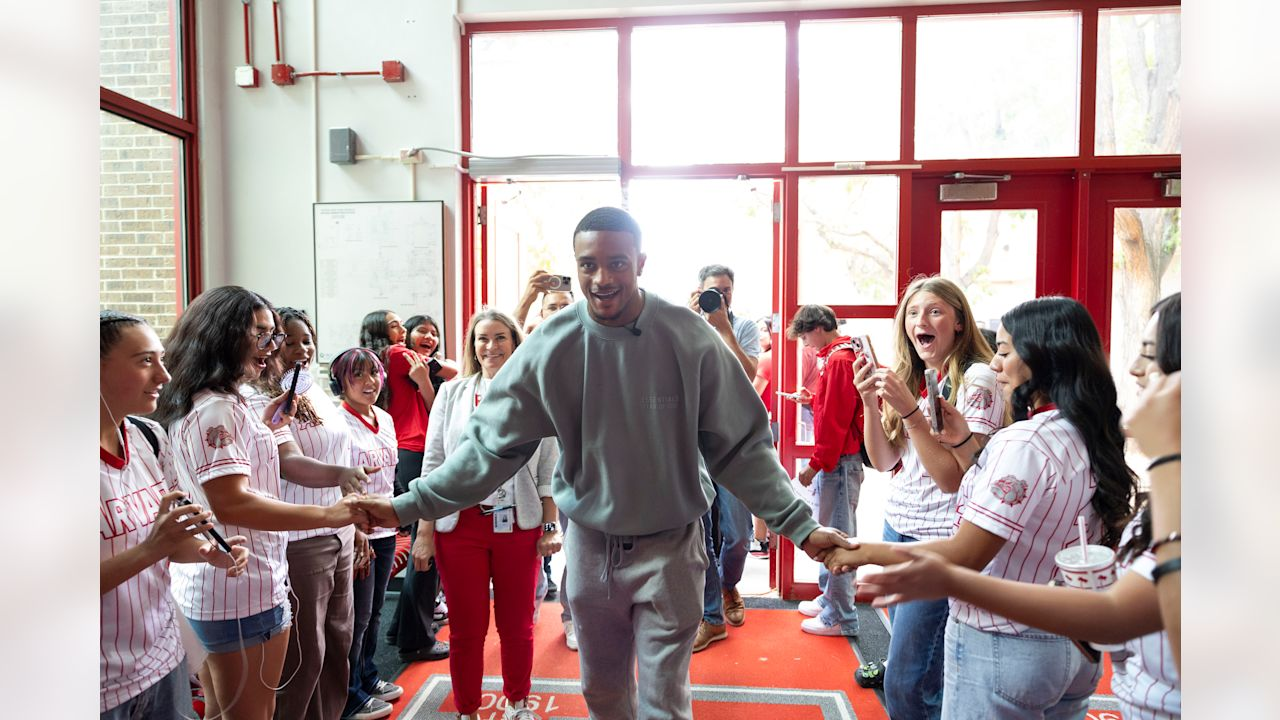
Patrick Surtain II walking into Arvada High School

== Patricio Illanes ==
In late 2025, the teacher Patricio Illanes was put on leave and later fired from Arvada High School. In January 2026, it was reported that Illanes had gotten 50 charges, 40 relating to CSAM content and sexual exploitation of children. A previous employer, Erie Middle School, had previously investigated Illanes for inappropriate conduct with students, and had not relayed this information onto Jefferson County Public Schools. Illanes did have a previous unrelated arrest in Weld County circa 2023.

== Notable alumni ==
- Tagg Bozied (1997), professional baseball player
- Joanne Conte
- Joe Decamillis (1983), American football coach, special teams coordinator (Denver Broncos)
- Cliff Olander, American football player
- Chris Sanders (1980), animator, filmmaker, voice actor, co-writer and co-director of Lilo & Stitch and How to Train Your Dragon
