= Barney's Colorful World =

- Directed by: Jim Rowley
- Written by: Stephen White
- Produced by: Charlotte Spivey
- Starring: Dean Wendt; Julie Johnson; Patty Wirtz
- Music by: Joe Phillips
- Production company: Lyons Partnership, L.P.
- Distributed by: HIT Entertainment
- Release date: September 14, 2004
- Running time: 70 minutes
- Country: United States
- Language: English

Barney's Colorful World was a stage show based on the Barney franchise. The show was first performed in January 2003 and toured until late 2004. In this stage show, Barney & his friends go around the world with the power of imagination. The video of the stage show was taped at the Dodge Theater in Phoenix, Arizona in March 2004, and released in September 2004.

== Cast ==
The following cast members were in the video release of "Colorful World." Other actors have been in the show as well, but are not listed.

- Dean Wendt as the voice of Barney
  - Patrick Mcalister and Rick Starkweather as Barney's costumed actors
- Julie Johnson as the voice of Baby Bop
  - Jennifer Barlean and Matthew N. Myers as Baby Bop's costumed actors
- Patty Wirtz as the voice of BJ
  - Dave Kendall and Jerad Harris as BJ's costumed actors

=== Cast from Stage Production ===
- Sarah (Vernon) Swartz as Barney

=== Additional Cast (UK) ===
- Blake Garrett as Mike
- Alex Collins as Donny
- Tory Green as Sarah
- Alexis Acosta as Gina

=== New Footage (US) ===
- Daven Wilson as Jackson
- Alyssa Franks as Stacy
- Julia Nicholson as Laura
- Mauri Howell as Mom

== Songs ==
=== Act 1 ===
1. "Barney Theme Song"
2. "If You're Happy and You Know It"
3. "Being Together"
4. "Mr. Knickerbocker"
5. "The Airplane Song"
6. "Jungle Adventure"
7. "The Elephant Song"
8. "If All the Raindrops"
9. "The Wheels on the Bus"
10. "It's C-C-C-Cold BRRRR!"
11. "Look at Me, I'm Dancing"
12. "The Rainbow Song"

=== Act 2 ===
1. "I'd Love to Sail"
2. "The Baby Bop Hop"
3. "Mr. Sun"
4. "Bingo"
5. "Castles So High"
6. "The Duckies Do"
7. "If I Lived Under the Sea"
8. "Bubbles"
9. "Twinkle, Twinkle, Little Star"
10. "Just Imagine"
11. "Colors All Around"
12. "I Love You"

== Tour Dates ==
Date	City	Country	Venue
January 17, 2003	Memphis	United States	Mid-South Coliseum
January 18, 2003	Memphis	United States	Mid-South Coliseum
January 19, 2003	Memphis	United States	Mid-South Coliseum
January 23, 2003	New York City	United States	Radio City Music Hall
January 24, 2003	New York City	United States	Radio City Music Hall
January 25, 2003	New York City	United States	Radio City Music Hall
January 26, 2003	New York City	United States	Radio City Music Hall
January 30, 2003	Philadelphia	United States	First Union Spectrum
January 31, 2003	Philadelphia	United States	First Union Spectrum
February 1, 2003	Philadelphia	United States	First Union Spectrum
February 4, 2003	Erie	United States	Erie Civic Center
February 5, 2003	Erie	United States	Erie Civic Center
February 7, 2003	Fairfax	United States	Patriot Center
February 8, 2003	Fairfax	United States	Patriot Center
February 9, 2003	Fairfax	United States	Patriot Center
February 11, 2003	Rochester	United States	Blue Cross Arena
February 12, 2003	Rochester	United States	Blue Cross Arena
February 14, 2003	Wilkes-Barre	United States	First Union Arena
February 15, 2003	Wilkes-Barre	United States	First Union Arena
February 16, 2003	Wilkes-Barre	United States	First Union Arena
February 19, 2003	Wallingford	United States	Oakdale Theatre
February 20, 2003	Wallingford	United States	Oakdale Theatre
February 21, 2003	Wallingford	United States	Oakdale Theatre
February 28, 2003	Milwaukee	United States	US Cellular Arena
March 1, 2003	Milwaukee	United States	US Cellular Arena
March 2, 2003	Milwaukee	United States	US Cellular Arena
March 4, 2003	Springfield	United States	Prairie Capital Convention Center
March 5, 2003	Springfield	United States	Prairie Capital Convention Center
March 13, 2003	Rosemont	United States	Rosemont Theatre
March 14, 2003	Rosemont	United States	Rosemont Theatre
March 15, 2003	Rosemont	United States	Rosemont Theatre
March 16, 2003	Rosemont	United States	Rosemont Theatre
March 19, 2003	Moline	United States	Mark of the Quad Cities
March 20, 2003	Moline	United States	Mark of the Quad Cities
March 21, 2003	Cleveland	United States	CSU Convocation Center
March 22, 2003	Cleveland	United States	CSU Convocation Center
March 23, 2003	Cleveland	United States	CSU Convocation Center
March 25, 2003	Columbus	United States	Nationwide Arena
March 26, 2003	Columbus	United States	Nationwide Arena
March 28, 2003	Louisville	United States	Broadbent Arena
March 29, 2003	Louisville	United States	Broadbent Arena
March 30, 2003	Louisville	United States	Broadbent Arena
April 1, 2003	Madison	United States	Alliant Energy Center Memorial Coliseum
April 2, 2003	Madison	United States	Alliant Energy Center Memorial Coliseum
April 4, 2003	Grand Rapids	United States	Van Andel Arena
April 5, 2003	Grand Rapids	United States	Van Andel Arena
April 6, 2003	Grand Rapids	United States	Van Andel Arena
April 10, 2003	Detroit	United States	The Palace of Auburn Hills
April 11, 2003	Detroit	United States	The Palace of Auburn Hills
April 12, 2003	Detroit	United States	The Palace of Auburn Hills
April 13, 2003	Detroit	United States	The Palace of Auburn Hills
April 15, 2003	Topeka	United States	Kansas Expocentre
April 16, 2003	Topeka	United States	Kansas Expocentre
April 18, 2003	Kansas City	United States	Municipal Auditorium
April 19, 2003	Kansas City	United States	Municipal Auditorium
April 22, 2003	Evansville	United States	Roberts Stadium
April 23, 2003	Evansville	United States	Roberts Stadium
April 25, 2003	Cincinnati	United States	Cincinnati Gardens
April 26, 2003	Cincinnati	United States	Cincinnati Gardens
April 27, 2003	Cincinnati	United States	Cincinnati Gardens
April 29, 2003	Tulsa	United States	Tulsa Convention Center
April 30, 2003	Tulsa	United States	Tulsa Convention Center
May 2, 2003	San Antonio	United States	Freeman Coliseum
May 3, 2003	San Antonio	United States	Freeman Coliseum
May 4, 2003	San Antonio	United States	Freeman Coliseum
May 6, 2003	Bossier City	United States	CenturyTel Center
May 7, 2003	Bossier City	United States	CenturyTel Center
May 9, 2003	Dallas	United States	Reunion Arena
May 10, 2003	Dallas	United States	Reunion Arena
May 11, 2003	Dallas	United States	Reunion Arena
May 13, 2003	Jackson	United States	Mississippi Coliseum
May 14, 2003	Jackson	United States	Mississippi Coliseum
May 16, 2003	Greenville	United States	Bi-Lo Center
May 17, 2003	Greenville	United States	Bi-Lo Center
May 18, 2003	Greenville	United States	Bi-Lo Center
September 5, 2003	Nashville	United States	Nashville Municipal Auditorium
September 6, 2003	Nashville	United States	Nashville Municipal Auditorium
September 7, 2003	Nashville	United States	Nashville Municipal Auditorium
September 30, 2003	Huntsville	United States	Von Braun Center
September 31, 2003	Huntsville	United States	Von Braun Center
October 1, 2003	Huntsville	United States	Von Braun Center
October 7, 2003	Mobile	United States	Mobile Civic Center
October 8, 2003	Mobile	United States	Mobile Civic Center
October 17, 2003	Oklahoma City	United States	Cox Convention Center
October 18, 2003	Oklahoma City	United States	Cox Convention Center
October 19, 2003	Oklahoma City	United States	Cox Convention Center
October 21, 2003	Cedar Rapids	United States	U.S. Cellular Center
October 22, 2003	Cedar Rapids	United States	U.S. Cellular Center
October 28, 2003	Council Bluffs	United States	Mid-America Center
October 29, 2003	Council Bluffs	United States	Mid-America Center
October 31, 2003	St. Louis	United States	Family Arena
November 1, 2003	St. Louis	United States	Family Arena
November 2, 2003	St. Louis	United States	Family Arena
November 4, 2003	Dayton	United States	Nutter Center
November 5, 2003	Dayton	United States	Nutter Center
November 7, 2003	Toronto	Canada	SkyDome
November 8, 2003	Toronto	Canada	SkyDome
November 9, 2003	Toronto	Canada	SkyDome
November 11, 2003	Ottawa	Canada	Corel Centre
November 12, 2003	Ottawa	Canada	Corel Centre
November 14, 2003	Albany	United States	Pepsi Arena
November 15, 2003	Albany	United States	Pepsi Arena
November 16, 2003	Albany	United States	Pepsi Arena
November 18, 2003	Indianapolis	United States	Pepsi Coliseum
November 19, 2003	Indianapolis	United States	Pepsi Coliseum
November 21, 2003	Knoxville	United States	Knoxville Civic Coliseum
November 22, 2003	Knoxville	United States	Knoxville Civic Coliseum
November 23, 2003	Knoxville	United States	Knoxville Civic Coliseum
December 2, 2003	Durham	United States	Whittemore Center Arena
December 3, 2003	Durham	United States	Whittemore Center Arena
December 5, 2003	Trenton	United States	Sovereign Bank Arena
December 6, 2003	Trenton	United States	Sovereign Bank Arena
December 7, 2003	Trenton	United States	Sovereign Bank Arena
December 9, 2003	Reading	United States	Sovereign Center
December 10, 2003	Reading	United States	Sovereign Center
December 12, 2003	Worcester	United States	Worcester Centrum Center
December 13, 2003	Worcester	United States	Worcester Centrum Center
December 14, 2003	Worcester	United States	Worcester Centrum Center
December 16, 2003	State College	United States	Bryce Jordan Center
December 17, 2003	State College	United States	Bryce Jordan Center
December 19, 2003	Baltimore	United States	1st Mariner Arena
December 20, 2003	Baltimore	United States	1st Mariner Arena
December 21, 2003	Baltimore	United States	1st Mariner Arena
December 29, 2003	Norfolk	United States	Scope Arena
December 30, 2003	Norfolk	United States	Scope Arena
January 2, 2004	Cincinnati	United States	US Bank Arena
January 3, 2004	Cincinnati	United States	US Bank Arena
January 4, 2004	Cincinnati	United States	US Bank Arena
January 6, 2004	Chattanooga	United States	UTC McKenzie Arena
January 7, 2004	Chattanooga	United States	UTC McKenzie Arena
January 9, 2004	Mobile	United States	Mobile Civic Center
January 10, 2004	Mobile	United States	Mobile Civic Center
January 13, 2004	Macon	United States	Macon Coliseum
January 14, 2004	Macon	United States	Macon Coliseum
January 16, 2004	Charlotte	United States	Cricket Arena
January 17, 2004	Charlotte	United States	Cricket Arena
January 18, 2004	Charlotte	United States	Cricket Arena
January 20, 2004	Little Rock	United States	Alltel Arena
January 21, 2004	Little Rock	United States	Alltel Arena
January 23, 2004	Baton Rouge	United States	Riverside Centroplex
January 24, 2004	Baton Rouge	United States	Riverside Centroplex
January 25, 2004	Baton Rouge	United States	Riverside Centroplex
January 29, 2004	Atlanta	United States	Atlanta Civic Center
January 30, 2004	Atlanta	United States	Atlanta Civic Center
January 31, 2004	Atlanta	United States	Atlanta Civic Center
February 1, 2004	Atlanta	United States	Atlanta Civic Center
February 3, 2004	Columbus	United States	Columbus Civic Center
February 4, 2004	Columbus	United States	Columbus Civic Center
February 6, 2004	Miami	United States	UM Convocation Center
February 7, 2004	Miami	United States	UM Convocation Center
February 8, 2004	Miami	United States	UM Convocation Center
February 10, 2004	Fort Myers	United States	TECO Arena
February 11, 2004	Fort Myers	United States	TECO Arena
February 17, 2004	Sunrise	United States	Office Depot Center
February 18, 2004	Sunrise	United States	Office Depot Center
February 20, 2004	Tampa	United States	St. Pete Times Forum
February 21, 2004	Tampa	United States	St. Pete Times Forum
February 22, 2004	Tampa	United States	St. Pete Times Forum
March 5, 2004	Los Angeles	United States	Kodak Theatre
March 6, 2004	Los Angeles	United States	Kodak Theatre
March 7, 2004	Los Angeles	United States	Kodak Theatre
March 12, 2004	Phoenix	United States	Dodge Theatre
March 13, 2004	Phoenix	United States	Dodge Theatre
March 14, 2004	Phoenix	United States	Dodge Theatre
March 16, 2004	Long Beach	United States	Long Beach Convention & Entertainment Center
March 17, 2004	Long Beach	United States	Long Beach Convention & Entertainment Center
March 19, 2004	Las Vegas	United States	Thomas & Mack Center
March 20, 2004	Las Vegas	United States	Thomas & Mack Center
March 21, 2004	Las Vegas	United States	Thomas & Mack Center
March 23, 2004	Bakersfield	United States	Centennial Garden
March 24, 2004	Bakersfield	United States	Centennial Garden
March 26, 2004	San Diego	United States	San Diego Sports Arena
March 27, 2004	San Diego	United States	San Diego Sports Arena
March 28, 2004	San Diego	United States	San Diego Sports Arena
March 29, 2004	San Diego	United States	San Diego Sports Arena
March 30, 2004	San Jose	United States	HP Pavilion
March 31, 2004	San Jose	United States	HP Pavilion
April 2, 2004	Oakland	United States	The Arena in Oakland
April 3, 2004	Oakland	United States	The Arena in Oakland
April 4, 2004	Oakland	United States	The Arena in Oakland
April 6, 2004	Fresno	United States	Save Mart Center
April 7, 2004	Fresno	United States	Save Mart Center
April 9, 2004	Sacramento	United States	Arco Arena
April 10, 2004	Sacramento	United States	Arco Arena
May 21, 2004	Nottingham	United Kingdom	Nottingham Arena
May 22, 2004	Nottingham	United Kingdom	Nottingham Arena
May 23, 2004	Nottingham	United Kingdom	Nottingham Arena
May 25, 2004	Newcastle	United Kingdom	Telewest Arena
May 26, 2004	Newcastle	United Kingdom	Telewest Arena
May 28, 2004	Birmingham	United Kingdom	National Indoor Arena
May 29, 2004	Birmingham	United Kingdom	National Indoor Arena
May 30, 2004	Birmingham	United Kingdom	National Indoor Arena
May 31, 2004	Birmingham	United Kingdom	National Indoor Arena
June 2, 2004	London	United Kingdom	Wembley Arena
June 3, 2004	London	United Kingdom	Wembley Arena
June 4, 2004	London	United Kingdom	Wembley Arena
June 5, 2004	London	United Kingdom	Wembley Arena
June 6, 2004	London	United Kingdom	Wembley Arena
June 10, 2004	Dublin	Ireland	Point Theatre
June 11, 2004	Dublin	Ireland	Point Theatre
June 12, 2004	Dublin	Ireland	Point Theatre
June 13, 2004	Dublin	Ireland	Point Theatre
June 15, 2004	Belfast	United Kingdom	Odyssey Arena
June 16, 2004	Belfast	United Kingdom	Odyssey Arena
June 18, 2004	Sheffield	United Kingdom	Hallam FM Arena
June 19, 2004	Sheffield	United Kingdom	Hallam FM Arena
June 20, 2004	Sheffield	United Kingdom	Hallam FM Arena
June 22, 2004	Cardiff	United Kingdom	Cardiff International Arena
June 23, 2004	Cardiff	United Kingdom	Cardiff International Arena
June 25, 2004	Manchester	United Kingdom	Manchester Evening News Arena
June 26, 2004	Manchester	United Kingdom	Manchester Evening News Arena
June 27, 2004	Manchester	United Kingdom	Manchester Evening News Arena
June 29, 2004	Aberdeen	United Kingdom	P&J Live
June 30, 2004	Aberdeen	United Kingdom	P&J Live
July 2, 2004	Glasgow	United Kingdom	Braehead Arena
July 3, 2004	Glasgow	United Kingdom	Braehead Arena
July 4, 2004	Glasgow	United Kingdom	Braehead Arena
September 7, 2004	Green Bay	United States	Resch Center
September 8, 2004	Green Bay	United States	Resch Center
September 10, 2004	Rosemont	United States	Rosemont Theatre
September 11, 2004	Rosemont	United States	Rosemont Theatre
September 12, 2004	Rosemont	United States	Rosemont Theatre
September 14, 2004	Sioux Falls	United States	Sioux Falls Arena
September 15, 2004	Sioux Falls	United States	Sioux Falls Arena
September 17, 2004	Minneapolis	United States	Target Center
September 18, 2004	Minneapolis	United States	Target Center
September 19, 2004	Minneapolis	United States	Target Center
September 21, 2004	Huntington	United States	Big Sandy Superstore Arena
September 22, 2004	Huntington	United States	Big Sandy Superstore Arena
September 24, 2004	Toronto	Canada	SkyDome
September 25, 2004	Toronto	Canada	SkyDome
September 26, 2004	Toronto	Canada	SkyDome
September 27, 2004	Ottawa	Canada	Corel Centre
September 28, 2004	Ottawa	Canada	Corel Centre
September 30, 2004	New York	United States	Radio City Music Hall
October 1, 2004	New York	United States	Radio City Music Hall
October 2, 2004	New York	United States	Radio City Music Hall
October 3, 2004	New York	United States	Radio City Music Hall
October 5, 2004	Lowell	United States	Tsongas Arena
October 6, 2004	Lowell	United States	Tsongas Arena
October 8, 2004	Wallingford	United States	Oakdale Theater
October 9, 2004	Wallingford	United States	Oakdale Theater
October 10, 2004	Wallingford	United States	Oakdale Theater
October 12, 2004	Fort Wayne	United States	Allen County War Memorial Coliseum
October 13, 2004	Fort Wayne	United States	Allen County War Memorial Coliseum
October 19, 2004	Austin	United States	Frank Erwin Center
October 20, 2004	Austin	United States	Frank Erwin Center
October 22, 2004	Dallas	United States	Nokia Live Theatre
October 23, 2004	Dallas	United States	Nokia Live Theatre
October 24, 2004	Dallas	United States	Nokia Live Theatre
November 14, 2004	Carbondale	United States	SIU Arena
November 15, 2004	Carbondale	United States	SIU Arena

== Production ==
Barney's Colorful World! was initially slated to begin touring in September 2002, but was eventually postponed by a few months. The inspiration behind Barney's Colorful World! came from the desire of scriptwriter Stephen White to have interesting and varied looks and environments for the stage to keep things interesting.

=== Casting ===
Cast members from Barney & Friends such as Katherine Pully, who portrayed "Beth" and Hayden Tweedie who portrayed "Sarah" were asked to take part in the tour. Tweedie reprised her role however Pully ultimately declined. During production of the tour, Sarah Vernon Swartz and Corby Sullivan, who would portray Barney within the original production of the tour, were trained by David Joyner, the original body of Barney on Barney & Friends, to do the signature 360 spin in New York.

The performances in Mexico and Puerto Rico were dubbed in Spanish, meaning that the voices of Barney, Baby Bop and BJ were done by Rubén Cerda, Elsa Covián and Love Santini, respectively. From September 2 to December 6, 2004, the role of Gina would be portrayed by Alexandrea Antonio. Also, Jackson, Laura and Stacy can still be seen in several scenes in the UK release of the video amongst many of the audience members who interact with Barney at the auditorium, as the stage performance was taken directly from the US release.

Hayden Tweedie did not reprise her role as Sarah in the video release. Despite this, she is still seen in the book adaptation (which was adapted into a read along for the DVD release).

== Release ==
After a soft run in Memphis, Tennessee, the show made its world premiere on January 23, 2003 at Radio City Music Hall in New York City, New York. The show performed in over eighty cities and performed over four-hundred shows. It was presented by Toys "R" Us during its original run and produced by HIT Entertainment. The show toured in North America, Canada, the United Kingdom, Ireland, Mexico, and Puerto Rico until December 2004. In the United States alone, the show was seen by over seven hundred fifty thousand people. It was also performed in Latin America from 2007 to 2009 and 2011.

The original run of the tour ran from January 2003 through to November 2004. During the original run of the tour, Barney performed sing-alongs at hospital Child Life centers in each of the tour cities and donated a library of Barney videos to the hospitals. Fisher-Price also donated Barney toys for playrooms as well. Also during the show's original run, the intermission consisted of Sheryl Leach (the creator of Barney) coming "backstage" to bring roses to Barney in his dressing room and congratulating him on how well the "show" was going so far.

=== Marketing ===
To promote the tour, Barney appeared on Live with Regis and Kelly on the day of the show's premiere, January 23, 2003. During his appearance he sang "I Love You" and "If You're Happy and You Know It". Given that the show was presented by Toys "R" Us, children were able to present their stage show ticket stub at their participating stores to get a free "Chat With Me" phone card to call Barney. The store would retain the ticket stub upon issuing Barney's "Chat With Me" phone card, where one card would be issued for each show ticket stub received. Participants then would call the toll-free number. In select cities, Toys "R" Us guests could order tickets before they went on sale to the general public by calling the phone number listed on their website. The program won the Silver Pyramid Award at the 26th Annual Promotional Products Association International in 2003. To promote the video release of the tour, Barney, Baby Bop, BJ, and the polar bear from the show performed "It's C-C Cold BRRRR!" for the 78th Macy's Thanksgiving Day Parade in November 2004.

=== Home media ===
Barney's Colorful World! was released on VHS and DVD on September 14, 2004. Alongside the filmed performance of the show, the DVD included cast interviews from the children, a read-along, episodes from various HIT Entertainment shows and much more. The Spanish-dubbed version of this video was released in 2008 to commemorate Barney's 20th anniversary. For the DVD release, it contained various episodes from various HIT Entertainment shows under the "HIT Extras" bonus feature. Those included the episodes "Muck Gets Stuck" from Bob the Builder, "Haircut" from The Wiggles, "Sploshy of the Arctic" from Rubbadubbers, "Angelina and Anya" from Angelina Ballerina, "The Treasure Hunt" from Kipper and "Pingu Goes Fishing" from Pingu. On April 22, 2022, the official Barney YouTube channel, managed by 9 Story Media Group at the time, uploaded the show on their platform, with the video uploaded coming from a Barney fan upload on the site. It was later included in the streaming package titled "Barney & Friends Specials", alongside other Barney Home Videos, which began streaming on Tubi on September 29, 2023.

== See also ==
- List of Barney & Friends episodes and videos
