= Blake Garrett =

American actor (1992–2026)

- Born: Nolan Blake Garrett; September 14, 1992; Austin, Texas, U.S.
- Died: February 8, 2026 (aged 33); Tulsa, Oklahoma, U.S.
- Occupation: Actor
- Years active: 2006–2011

Nolan Blake Garrett (September 14, 1992 – February 8, 2026) was an American film and stage actor, best known for his role as Plug in the children's comedy film How to Eat Fried Worms.

== Life and career ==
Even at a young age, Garrett showed an interest in acting and the performing arts, which led him to begin his artistic career in local theatre productions at a young age.

From an early age, he dedicated himself to acting and appeared in local theatre productions such as Aladdin and His Magic Lamp, Peanuts: A Charlie Brown Tribute, The Wizard of Oz, Annie and Grease. At the age of ten, he joined the international tour of Barney's Colorful World and performed roles in the live show.

Garrett's best-known film role was in the 2006 family comedy How to Eat Fried Worms, based on the children's book of the same name. He played Plug, a classmate of the protagonist. His performance was part of the ensemble cast that won the award for Best Child Ensemble in a Feature Film at the 2007 Young Artist Awards.

After his time as a child actor, Garrett led a relatively private life. He struggled with addiction and managed to remain sober in the years leading up to his death. He lived in Tulsa in his later years.

In February 2026 Garrett was brought to the emergency room in extreme pain, which was later determined to be shingles. He died on February 8, 2026, at the age of 33. In an interview with TMZ, Garrett's mother stated that she believed he may have self-medicated to cope with the pain, and that they were awaiting an autopsy to determine the cause of death. In July, it was determined Garrett died from an accidental fentanyl overdose.

== Filmography ==
=== Film ===
- How to Eat Fried Worms (2006)

=== Theater ===
- Aladdin and his Magical Lamp
- Peanuts: A Charlie Brown Tribute
- The Wizard of Oz
- Annie
- Grease
- Barney's Colorful World
