= And You Think You Know What Life's About =

Studio album by Dishwalla
- Released: August 11, 1998
- Recorded: Trackholmes, Santa Barbara; Music Box, Hollywood
- Genre: Rock, alternative rock
- Length: 50:46
- Label: A&M
- Producer: Marc Waterman & Dishwalla

Dishwalla chronology
| Pet Your Friends (1995) | And You Think You Know What Life's About (1998) | Opaline (2002) |

Singles from And You Think You Know What Life's About
- 1. "Once in a While" Released: 1998; 2. "Stay Awake" Released: 1998

And You Think You Know What Life's About is the second album by Dishwalla, released in 1998 on A&M Records.

== Critical reception ==
Professional ratings
Review scores
| Source | Rating |
|---|---|
| AllMusic | 2.5/5 stars |
| Entertainment Weekly | C− |

The Washington Post noted that "the band's most bombastic choruses contain echoes of the slick power ballads that grunge banished." Entertainment Weekly wrote that "when they pull out the cheesy Top 40 stops ... like on the ballad 'Until I Wake Up', they come off like a modern-rock Journey—a guilty pleasure, but a pleasure nonetheless." The Ottawa Citizen determined that "the band remains a non-innovator, relying on go-to guitar riffs and catchy rock melodies."

Stereo Review concluded that "Dishwalla spends part of its second album whining about the success of its first one." Rolling Stone thought that frontman J.R. Richards "has managed to shed his grumbly, disaffected vocals for a softer croon on tracks such as 'The Bridge Song'." The Boston Globe opined that "Dishwalla's chameleon act seems in total defiance of establishing a trademark sound." The Los Angeles Times wrote that "this angst-filled and metal-tinged sophomore try sinks quickly under the weight of overblown emotion and puerile lyrics."

== Track listing ==
1. "Stay Awake" - 4:13
2. "Once in a While" - 4:42
3. "Bottom of the Floor" - 3:29
4. "Healing Star" - 4:21
5. "Until I Wake Up" - 5:16
6. "5 Star Day" - 4:12
7. "Truth Serum" - 5:29
8. "So Blind" - 3:41
9. "Gone Upside Down" - 3:59
10. "So Much Time" - 4:37
11. "The Bridge Song" - 3:10
12. "Pop Guru" - 3:34

Total Length: 50:46

== Personnel ==
- Scot Alexander: Bass, Vocals
- Rodney Browning-Cravens: Guitars, Vocals
- George Pendergast: Drums, Vocals
- J.R. Richards: Vocals, Guitar, Additional Keyboards
- Jim Wood: Keyboards, Vocals
- Uncle Jake Richards: Acoustic Guitar and Backing Vocals on "The Bridge Song"
- Peter Byck, Marc Waterman and David Young: Backing Vocals on "Bottom of the Floor"
- Engineered by Marc Waterman and Jim Wood
- Mixed by Chris Lord-Alge at Image Recording, Hollywood, California, assisted by Andrew Garver
