= How to Eat Fried Worms =

1973 children's book by Thomas Rockwell

- First edition cover
- Author: Thomas Rockwell
- Illustrator: Emily McCully
- Language: English
- Series: Children's novel
- Publisher: Franklin Watts
- Publication date: 1973
- Media type: Print
- Pages: 115
- Followed by: How to Fight a Girl

How to Eat Fried Worms is a children's book written by Thomas Rockwell, first published in 1973. The novel's plot involves a boy eating worms as part of a bet. It has been the frequent target of censors and appears on the American Library Association's list of most commonly challenged books in the United States of 1990–2000 at number 96. It was later turned into a CBS Storybreak episode in the mid-1980s, and a movie of the same name in 2006.

The story continues in two sequels: How to Fight a Girl and How to Get Fabulously Rich.

== Plot summary ==
Alan bets his friend, Billy Forrester, that he can't eat 15 worms in 15 days. Billy, who needs money to buy a minibike, agrees to the bet only if Alan will pay him $50 for the win. Their friend Tom says he'll assist Billy, while another friend, Joe, sides with Alan. They search for worms near Billy's family farm and come up with a handful of night crawler earthworms the size of large pencils. As Billy nears victory, he faces a flurry of nasty tricks and traps that go wildly out of control. Despite this, Billy wins the bet and, consequently, is now hooked on worms.
