= Tagg Bozied =

American baseball player (born 1979)

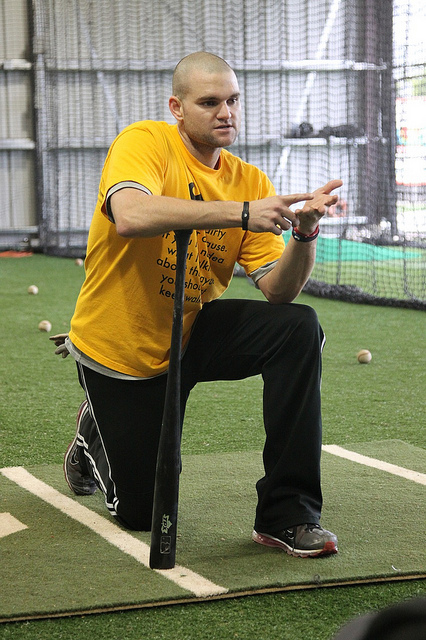
- Bozied at the University of San Francisco, December 2010
- Born: July 24, 1979 (age 46); Sioux Falls, South Dakota, U.S.
- Bats: Right Throws: Right
- Stats at Baseball Reference

Robert Tanios Taggert "Tagg" Bozied (born July 24, 1979) is an American former professional baseball first baseman. He was an All-American college baseball player as well as member of the United States national baseball team.

== Baseball career ==
=== High school career ===
Son of Bob Bozied, a college football coach for over 40 years, Tagg says he grew up understanding the importance of team. He watched his father take Augustana College, a Division II team to two playoff appearances. Bozied graduated from Arvada High School in Arvada, Colorado. At Arvada, Bozied was named to the Class 4A All-State football team with a 4.0 GPA.

=== College career ===
Bozied attended the University of San Francisco (USF). In 1999, he won a Triple Crown in the West Coast Conference, earning him Player of the Year honors. He hit .412 with 30 home runs and 82 RBI; he was 10 homers ahead of runner-up Jason Bay. Bozied also led the Conference with 71 runs. He slugged .936, the highest mark in all of NCAA Division I and tied for the second-most homers in Division I. Baseball America named him second-team All-American at designated hitter behind Ken Harvey. He was named a first-team third baseman Collegiate Baseball All-American.

Bozied spent 1999 with the United States national baseball team, hitting .303 with a .439 slugging percentage as their main first baseman (Xavier Nady manned third, Bozied's position at the University of San Francisco. The collegiate Team USA did not play in any major international tournaments that year. Bozied fell to .359 with 14 homers and 52 RBI as a junior in 2000, finishing sixth in the West Coast Conference in average and fourth in homers. He made All-Conference at third base. In 2001, his senior season, Bozied hit .335 with 12 homers, 20 steals and 51 runs for USF. He was once again the All-Conference pick at third base. USF retired Bozied's #19.

=== Professional career ===
Bozied was picked by the Minnesota Twins in the 50th round of the 1997 amateur draft but did not sign. After his junior season at USF, Bozied was taken by the Minnesota Twins in the second round of the 2000 amateur draft, the 42nd-overall pick, but did not sign.

The San Diego Padres chose him in the third round of the 2001 amateur draft as the 90th overall pick. Negotiations fell through and Bozied joined the independent Sioux Falls Canaries of the Northern League for the remainder of the 2001 season.

Bozied signed with the Padres for the 2002 and played with the Class-A Lake Elsinore Storm, hitting .298/.377/.546 with 15 homers as their main first baseman. That earned him a promotion to the Double-A Mobile BayBears, for whom he hit .214/.268/.389 in 60 games. Overall, his 24 home runs led Padres farmhands, as did his 92 RBI.

By 2003, Bozied was playing full-time in Triple-A. He hit .273/.331/.431 for the Portland Beavers. His 59 RBI tied old Conference rival Jason Bay for the team lead and his 14 homers were second to Bay's 20. He led the Pacific Coast League with 77 assists at first base.

Bozied started off 2004 hitting .315/.374/.629 with 16 homers and 58 RBI in his first 57 games for Portland. On July 19, he hit a game-winning game-ending grand slam to give Portland a victory over the Tacoma Rainiers. During his celebration at home plate, he ruptured the patella tendon in his left knee and had to be hospitalized. He did not return to the field that year. Bozied battled knee problems throughout 2005, hitting .333/.388/.533 in 12 games for Mobile and .259/.323/.444 in 14 contests for Portland. This likely cost him a shot at the majors.

Let go by San Diego, Bozied signed with the New York Mets. He batted .256/.358/.481 in 60 games for the 2006 Norfolk Tides, being used primarily as an outfielder. He was then signed by the St. Louis Cardinals; in 2007, he hit .264/.349/.490 for the Memphis Redbirds, with 24 home runs, 82 RBI and a .336 average against left-handers (.234 versus righties). He was second on Memphis in homers and RBI, trailing Rick Ankiel in both departments.

In 2008, Bozied joined the Florida Marlins organization. He batted .306/.382/.569 with 86 runs, 28 doubles, 26 home runs and 80 RBI. He was second on the Albuquerque Isotopes in homers and RBI, trailing Dallas McPherson in both.

On April 28, 2009, Bozied joined the Brother Elephants of Chinese Professional Baseball League in Taiwan. On July 8, 2009, he was signed to a minor-league contract by the Pittsburgh Pirates, and assigned to their Triple-A club.

On December 31, 2009, Bozied signed with the Philadelphia Phillies. He was named Eastern League Player of the Week for the week ending August 23, 2010, playing with the Reading Phillies In 2011, Bozied played for the AAA Lehigh Valley IronPigs.

Bozied filed for free agency after the 2011 season. He retired before the 2012 season began, in order to focus on launching a technology company with partners.

== Baseball retirement ==
March 2020, in Las Vegas, Tagg was inducted into the WCC Hall of Fame with his friends and family in attendance, calling him "one of the best power hitters in WCC, USF history"

== Personal life ==
In 2009 he and his ex-wife lived in San Francisco, California. He moved back to Colorado in November 2016 to be closer to family. He re-married in December 2022 and still lives in Denver, Colorado.
