= Cliff Olander =

American gridiron football player and coach (born 1955)

No. 10, 20, 11
- Position: Quarterback

Personal information
- Born: April 15, 1955 (age 71); Hartford, Connecticut, U.S.
- Listed height: 6 ft 5 in (1.96 m)
- Listed weight: 191 lb (87 kg)

Career information
- High school: Arvada (Arvada, Colorado)
- College: New Mexico State
- NFL draft: 1977: 5th round, 128th overall pick

Career history

Playing
- San Diego Chargers (1977–1979); New York Giants (1980–1981); Edmonton Eskimos (1982); Arizona Wranglers (1984)*; Michigan Panthers (1984)*; Oklahoma Outlaws (1984)*
- * Offseason or practice squad member only

Coaching
- Irvin High School (1992–2005) Offensive coordinator; Irvin High School (2005–2011) Head coach

Awards and highlights
- Grey Cup champion (1982)

Career NFL statistics
- Passing attempts: 24
- Passing completions: 12
- Completion percentage: 50.0%
- TD–INT: 0–3
- Passing yards: 125
- Passer rating: 25.9
- Stats at Pro Football Reference

Clifford Valmore Olander (born April 15, 1955) is an American former professional football player who was a quarterback for three seasons with the San Diego Chargers of the National Football League (NFL). He played college football for the New Mexico State Aggies and was selected by the Chargers in the fifth round of the 1977 NFL draft. He was also a member of the Edmonton Eskimos of the Canadian Football League (CFL).

== Early life ==
Olander first attended Clear Creek High School in League City, Texas, before transferring to Arvada High School in Arvada, Colorado.

== College career ==
Olander was a quarterback and punter for the New Mexico State Aggies. He recorded career passing totals of 1,307 yards and seven touchdowns.

== Professional career ==
Olander was selected by the San Diego Chargers in the fifth round, with the 128th overall pick, of the 1977 NFL draft. He played for the Chargers from 1977 to 1979. He made his only start in a 12-7 victory over the defending Super Bowl champion Oakland Raiders on November 20, 1977. Olander was a member of the NFL's New York Giants from 1980 to 1981 but did not play in any games for them. He scored one point during his NFL career; in a game against the Oakland Raiders on September 9, 1979, Olander kicked an extra point, filling in for an injured Rolf Benirschke. He was a member of the Edmonton Eskimos of the CFL from 1982 to 1983, winning the 70th Grey Cup in 1982. He was released by the Eskimos in June 1983.

In January 1984, the Michigan Panthers of the United States Football League (USFL) traded Ken Bungarda to the Arizona Wranglers for the rights to Olander. In February 1984, he was released by the Panthers and signed by the Oklahoma Outlaws.

== Coaching career ==
Olander was offensive coordinator of the Irvin High School Rockets from 1992 to 2005. He became head coach in August 2005 and later resigned in January 2011.
