= Thomas Rockwell =

American author of children's books (1933–2024)

- Born: Thomas Rhodes Rockwell; March 13, 1933; New Rochelle, New York, U.S.
- Died: September 27, 2024 (aged 91); Danbury, Connecticut, U.S.
- Education: Bard College
- Occupation: Novelist
- Spouse: Gail Sudler (m. 1955; died 2010)
- Children: 2
- Relatives: Norman Rockwell (father)
- Writing career
- Period: 1960–1990
- Notable work: How to Eat Fried Worms (1973)

Thomas Rhodes Rockwell (March 13, 1933 – September 27, 2024) was an American author of children's books, best known for writing How to Eat Fried Worms.

== Life and career ==
Rockwell was born in New Rochelle, New York, in 1933, the son of the American artist Norman Rockwell and his second wife Mary Rockwell, a school teacher and unpublished author. He grew up in Arlington, Vermont, a very rural small town. He attended a one-room schoolhouse; there were 23 students in his high school graduating class. His early mentors were Jim and Clara Edgerton, local farmers. He attended Bard College. In 1955, he married Gail Sudler, who was often the illustrator for his books; they had two children and were married until her death in 2010.

Rockwell said that he always wanted to write. He was co-writer of his father's 1960 autobiography, My Adventures as an Illustrator. He got the idea of writing children's books when he started reading to his own son, Barnaby. His wife Gail illustrated several of his books.

His best-known book is How to Eat Fried Worms (1973), about a boy who accepts a US$50 (equivalent to $360 in 2025) bet to eat one worm per day for 15 days. Although it was rejected by 23 publishers before finally coming out in print, the book sold well over 3 million copies and received the Mark Twain Award, the California Young Reader Medal, and the Sequoyah Book Award. It was made into an animated TV episode of CBS Storybreak in 1985 and a 2006 film.

In 2013, Rockwell and his daughter, Abigail, “vehemently condemned” Deborah Solomon’s book American Mirror, a falsified biography of Norman Rockwell which floated unsupported theories that he was gay and experienced "pedophilic impulses". The family described the book as "fraudulent".

Rockwell lived in LaGrangeville, a hamlet in LaGrange, New York. He died from complications of Parkinson's disease at a hospice in Danbury, Connecticut, on September 27, 2024, at the age of 91.

== Selected publications ==
- Rackety-bang, and other verses, illustrated by Gail Rockwell (1969) - ASIN B007SZXC5U
- Squawwwk!, illustrated by Gail Rockwell (1972) - ASIN B001LSDX72
- How to Eat Fried Worms (1973) – ISBN 0-440-42185-3
- The Portmanteau Book, illustrated by Gail Rockwell (1974) - ISBN 978-0553150629
- How to Fight a Girl (1987) – ISBN 978-0440401117 - sequel to How to Eat Fried Worms
- How to Get Fabulously Rich (1990) - ISBN 978-1843622079 sequel to How to Fight a Girl
