= Joanne Conte =

American politician

Joanne Marie Conte (October 18, 1933 – January 27, 2013) was an American politician. She is considered to be the first openly transgender person to be elected to a city council in the United States. She served on Arvada's City Council from 1991 to 1995. In March 1993, Conte made a public announcement revealing that she was transgender as a preemptive strike against Westword, which had been planning to publish the story on their front page.

Following her short-lived political career, she became a radio host on 850 KOA, but quit after only a few episodes due to transmisogynistic advertising for her broadcast. She went on to work as an investigative reporter for KGNU Radio.

== Early life ==
Joanne Conte was born in 1933 in Rochester, New York. She attended Arvada High School, and went on to serve as a military Morse code operator for the U.S. Army and Air Force during the Korean War.

In 1972, Conte legally changed her name. The next year, she had surgery related to being transgender. She came out to her family, who subsequently disowned her. Afterwards, she mostly kept her status as a transgender woman a secret until 1993, when she came out publicly right before an article in Westword was published that outed her previous identity as a man.

Conte first became involved with political organizing on a small scale in the 1980s when she organized efforts to keep Arvada's City Council from allowing a trash transfer station to be established in a neighborhood near her own.

== Term as councilwoman ==
In 1991, Conte ran for Arvada City Council and won. She focused heavily on citizen outreach during her term. She sought to make government happenings accessible to the public, so citizens could make more informed political decisions.

Despite being candid in her politics, Conte was secretive about her past. This made her adversaries suspicious enough to hire a private investigator who dug up evidence of her name change and gender-confirming surgery, which was then leaked to the tabloid newspaper Westword. Word reached Conte that the tabloid was planning to run a front-page article outing her as transgender, and she was forced to make the announcement herself before they could. The revelation destroyed her political career, though she admitted she was relieved to no longer have to live in secrecy, and felt that she helped pave the way for other trans women in politics.

In 1994, Conte submitted a petition to run as an independent candidate for the Colorado House of Representatives, but was denied a spot on the ballot by then Secretary of State Natalie Meyer. Conte filed an appeal with the Supreme Court and, in the case of Conte v. Meyer, it was determined that Conte would appear on the ballot by a ruling of 5-2. She lost the election. Before leaving office, Conte audited the city budget and convinced the council to cut out non-essential services in response to Arvada's declining revenue.

In 1994, while serving as councilwoman, Conte filed a workers' compensation claim which alleged that leaning on her desk during council meetings caused a staph infection on her right elbow.

Though her political career was over, Conte continued to be a strong activist. She began her career in radio broadcasting with 850 KOA, where her show was promoted by ads which asked "Is it a man? Is it a woman?" After only a few episodes, Conte left for KGNU radio, which was better suited to her passion for politics and activism. There, she broadcast news segments and weekly call-in shows, reporting on news and issues that were overlooked by other news sources and continuing to fight for those whose voices were going unheard. Her shows covered topics ranging from affordable housing in the Denver area to the issue of state-approved chemical castration of pedophiles.

== Conte v. Meyer ==
Conte ran for Colorado State Legislature in 1994, but was almost denied ballot access. She planned to run as an independent and officially changed her affiliation on August 2, 1993. The deadline to turn in her petition for candidacy was August 2, 1994. She filed her petition—signed by three appellants—on July 18, 1994 and was told two separate times that her petition was sufficient and that any defects in the petition would be remedied before the filing deadline.

Later, Conte filed a lawsuit against the Colorado law which stated the ballot order in which Democrats and Republicans appear should be random, while stipulating that other candidates always had to appear below the Democrat and Republican choices. After Conte filed the lawsuit, Meyer reversed her decision to allow Conte ballot access on the grounds that she had not been an independent for a full year when she turned in her petition. Conte appealed Meyer's decision to the Colorado Supreme Court in the case Conte v. Meyer. The court reversed Meyer's decision by a vote of 5-2, with the majority opinion interpreting the law to mean that a petition is on file from the time it is turned in until the date it is due.

== Activism ==
In 1996, Conte restarted an organization she had begun in 1991, Save Arvada's Residential Areas (SARA), to oppose an annexation proposed by the Arvada City Council. Later that year, she ran a petition drive to limit campaign contributions and cap spending in Arvada mayoral and council races.

In 2003, Conte led a group of concerned people against storage of chemical waste in Arvada. Following the Arvada City Council's vote in favor of the storage, she began the process to get a referendum against the chemical storage on the ballot for the November 2003 election.

In 2004, Conte called for a public investigation into accusations that Arvada Mayor Ken Fellman had unlawfully removed his opponent's campaign signs.

In the 2006 election year, during a controversy about the salaries of city managers in Colorado, Conte supported Arvada City Manager Craig Kocian but believed that his salary should be redistributed. She commented that Kocian made $165,000 ($263,515 in 2025) a year, while each city council member made less than $10,000 ($15,971 in 2025).
