= J. R. Richards =

American singer-songwriter (born 1967)

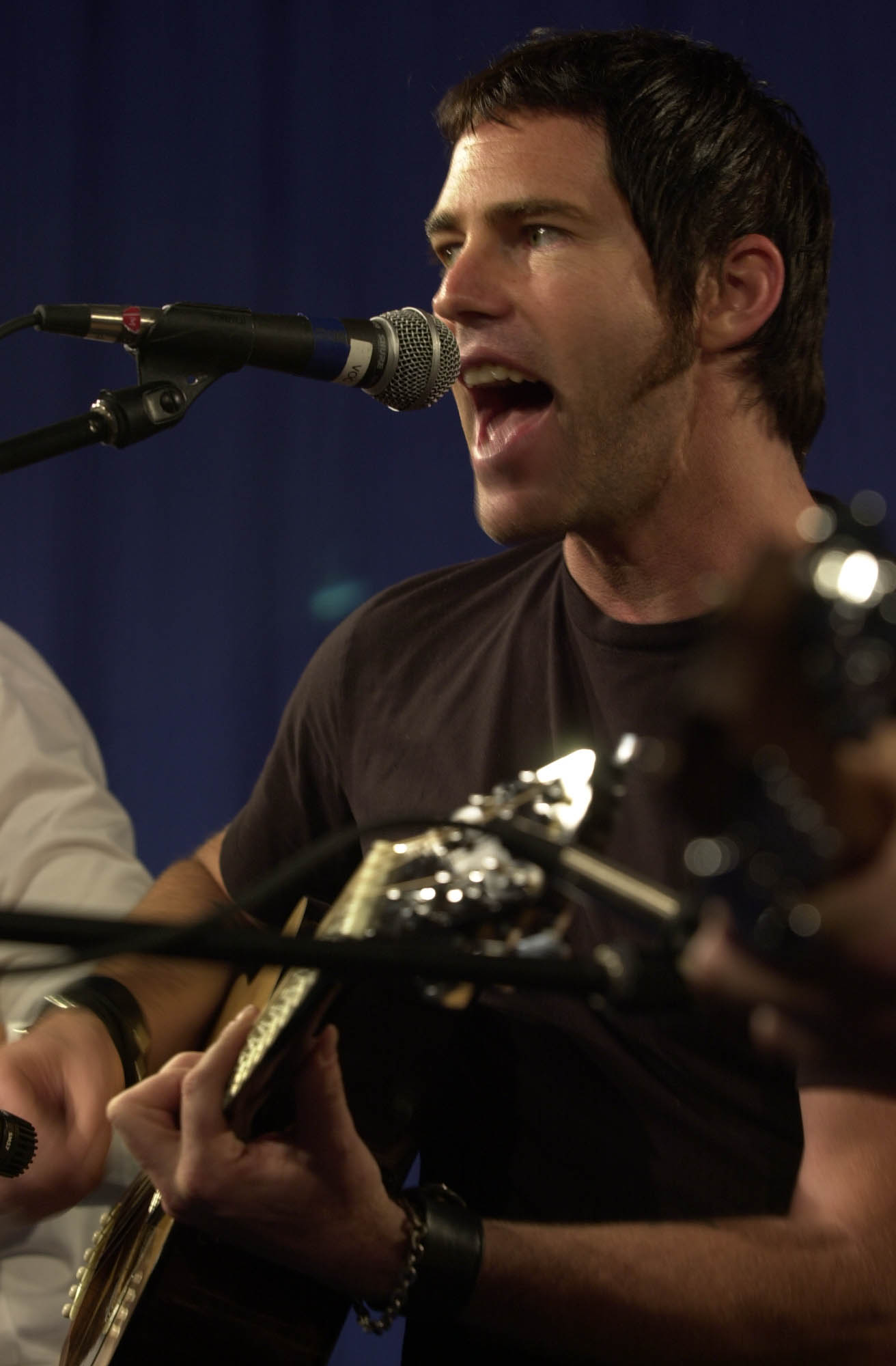
- Richards in 2003

Background information
- Also known as: JR
- Born: John Robert Richards; April 30, 1967 (age 59); Santa Barbara, California, U.S.
- Genre: Alternative rock
- Occupations: Singer, songwriter, producer, musician, engineer
- Instruments: Vocals, piano, guitar, keyboards, bass, drums, clarinet and programming
- Formerly of: Dishwalla
- Website: jrrichardsmusic.com

John Robert Richards, later Reid-Richards (born April 30, 1967) is an American singer-songwriter, musician, record producer and television and film composer. Prior to his 2008 departure, Richards was the original lead singer and principal songwriter of the alternative rock band Dishwalla.

== Career ==
=== Dishwalla ===
Richards began his career as the lead singer of the alternative rock band Dishwalla. The band released their debut album Pet Your Friends in 1995. The album scored Dishwalla a #1 hit in 1996 with the Richards-penned "Counting Blue Cars", which won Richards a Billboard Music Award for Top Mainstream Rock Track of the Year.

Dishwalla produced four other albums with Richards as lead singer and main songwriter, including And You Think You Know What Life's About (1998), Opaline (2002), a live album called Live... Greetings from the Flow State (2003), and Dishwalla (2005). Following the completion of Dishwalla, bassist Scot Alexander and drummer Pete Maloney left the band. The band broke up shortly after their departures. In 2008, Dishwalla reformed without Richards.

=== Solo career and other ventures ===
Richards’ debut solo album, A Beautiful End, was released in 2009 and debuted in the Top 50 on iTunes. In 2015, Richards released his second solo album, Honore et Amore, as well as an all-acoustic album of songs he wrote while in Dishwalla, Stripped in 2016. Richards has released 2 albums and 2 EPs since, the holiday EP Angelgold in 2018, an album of covers called Under The Cover in 2019, the EP Where's The Laughter in 2021 and Richards recently released his fifth solo album, My Darkest Hour, in 2025.

In January 2011, Richards co-created the 20k Watts project. 20k Watts is an eco-alliance which aims to bring sustainable clean energy to developing communities in need. In 2013, the city of Los Angeles awarded Richards a proclamation for dedication to enhancing the lives of families in extreme poverty for his work in El Salvador with 20k Watts.

Richards has been producing since the 1990s and, along with Dishwalla, has gone on to produce other artists including Dom AD, Amy Grant, boudwin, Paddock, Awi Rafael and the British band BritRoyal. He also produced his solo albums as well as songs for various television shows, including One Tree Hill in 2009, How I Met Your Mother in 2012, and Criminal Minds in 2013. In 2013, he wrote, produced, and performed songs (including the theme song "White Light") for the TV series SAF3. In 2017, Richards wrote and recorded twenty songs for the newly re-booted version of Baywatch.

Richards has appeared as an actor in the films Charmed, Almost Anything, 2:13 and Morning (which he also scored). Richards also played the lead role of Jesus in the rock opera Jesus Christ Superstar with the Golden State Pop Orchestra in Los Angeles.

=== Discography ===
- My Darkest Hour (2025)
- Where's The Laughter (EP) (2021)
- Under the Cover (2019)
- Angelgold (EP) (2018)
- Stripped (2016)
- Honore et Amore (2015)
- A Beautiful End (2009)
- Dishwalla (2005)
- Live...Greetings (2003)
- Opaline (2002)
- And you think you know (1998)
- Pet your friends (1995)

== Personal life ==
Richards graduated from Santa Barbara High School, where his father was principal. He is married to British director and sculptor Min Reid-Richards. The couple have four children.

== Awards ==
- R&R No. 1 Record of the Year 1996
- R&R No. 1 Top 50 Active Rock Chart 5 Weeks in a row
- R&R No. 1 Top 50 Alternative Rock Chart 2 Weeks in a row
- R&R No. 1 Top 50 Rock Chart 2 Weeks in a row
- R&R Top 5 Hot AC Chart
- Billboard Award for Rock Track of the Year 1997
- Billboard No. 1 Heatseeker Album Track
- Billboard No. 1 Modern Rock Track
- Billboard No. 4 Top 40 Mainstream Track
- Billboard No. 5 Hot AC Track
- Billboard No. 15 Hot 100 Track
- RIAA Certified Gold Record – Pet Your Friends
- RIAA Certified Gold Record – American Pie (ST)
- RIAA Certified Gold Single – Counting Blue Cars
- ASCAP Pop Music Award 1997
- ASCAP Pop Music Award 1998
- City of Los Angeles Proclamation for Dedication to Enhancing Lives of Families living in Extreme Poverty 2013
