= Dishwalla =

American alternative rock band

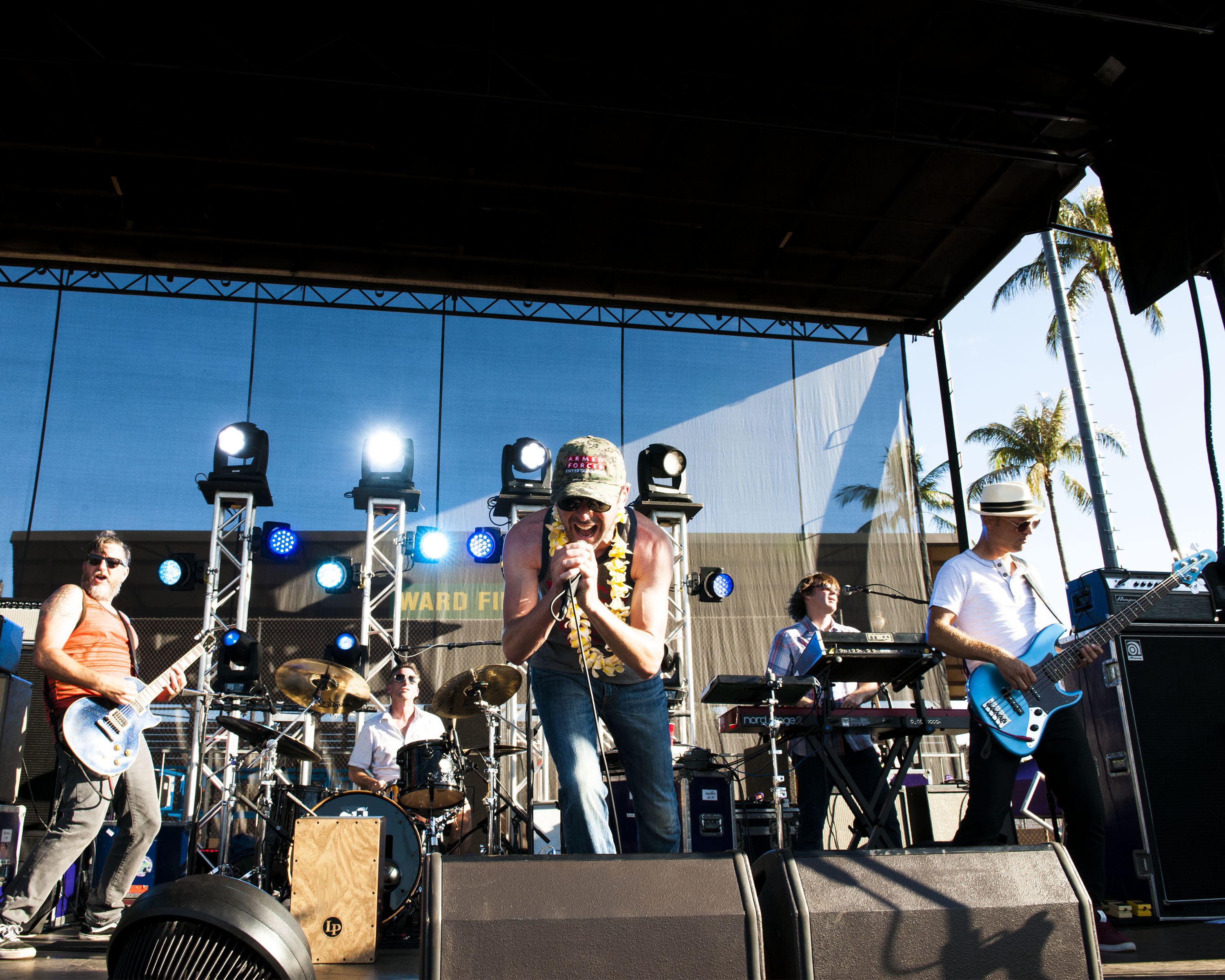
- Dishwalla performing at Joint Base Pearl Harbor Hickam in 2015. From left to right: Browning Cravens, Pendergast, Fox, Wood and Alexander.

Background information
- Also known as: Life Talking (1990–1992); Dish (1992–1993)
- Origin: Santa Barbara, California, U.S.
- Genre: Alternative rock
- Years active: 1990–2005; 2008–present
- Labels: A&M, Interscope, Immergent, Orphanage, Pavement Entertainment
- Members: Rodney Browning Cravens; Scot Alexander; Jim Wood; George Pendergast; Justin Fox
- Past members: J.R. Richards; Greg Kolanek; Pete Maloney
- Website: dishwalla.com

Dishwalla is an American alternative rock band from Santa Barbara, California. Formed by vocalist J.R. Richards, guitarist Rodney Browning, and keyboardist Greg Kolanek, they were initially known as Life Talking and then Dish upon adding bassist Scot Alexander and drummer George Pendergast.

Due to a cease-and-desist letter, the band settled on Dishwalla in late 1993. The Dishwalla name came from a Hindi term for a person providing satellite TV to a neighborhood ("dish" + walla). Kolanek took the name from a Wired magazine article. The band is best known for its 1996 hit song "Counting Blue Cars".

== History ==
=== Formation and eventual change to Dishwalla (1990–1993) ===
J.R. Richards (vocals/rhythm guitar), Rodney Browning (guitar), and Greg Kolanek (keyboards) formed the band Life Talking in 1990. They released one demo album, By the Color, in 1991. Unlike their later output, Life Talking was more synthpop and electronic-oriented.

The following year, the band changed its name to Dish as they added Scot Alexander (bass) and George Pendergast (drums) to the lineup. With a full band, their sound shifted into an alternative rock direction. Dish self-released a demo album in 1993, Dish, as it featured three songs that were later re-recorded for their major label debut ("Charlie Brown's Parents", "Give", and "All She Can See"), one song that was re-recorded from their Life Talking era ("Worthless"), and three exclusive tracks ("The Chair", "Love Sees No Color", and "Tear").

Due to a cease-and-desist letter in August 1993, the band changed their name to Dishwalla. The name was based on a Wired magazine article that Kolanek had read, in which the story described a person who provided satellite TV to a neighborhood ("dish" + walla).

=== Major label signing and mainstream success with Pet Your Friends (1994–1997) ===
In early 1994, the band signed with the major label A&M Records when one of the label's A&R representatives, Mark Mazzetti, obtained their demo tape. Dishwalla then recorded "It's Going to Take Some Time" on the tribute album If I Were a Carpenter, which featured cover versions of songs by The Carpenters. The band made their televised debut, performing the songs "It's Going to Take Some Time" and "Moisture", on The Jon Stewart Show shortly after. Kolanek departed from the band around the same time, although the reasoning was not explained (he was given songwriting credits on the band's subsequent release however). The band stayed as a quartet at that point, and they continued recording their debut album, Pet Your Friends. The album featured producer Phil Nicolo (known as one half of The Butcher Bros.), and the album was finished by the end of 1994. It was set to be released in May 1995, and Dishwalla went on a short US tour with Better Than Ezra shortly beforehand; however, the release date was pushed to August 1995. Jim Wood was then brought in as the band's keyboardist for live performances. In 1996, the single "Counting Blue Cars" from Pet Your Friends climbed to No. 15 on the Billboard Hot 100 chart and topped the Modern Rock Tracks chart, bringing the band mainstream success. Other singles off the album, such as "Give" and "Charlie Brown's Parents", appeared on various charts in both the US and Canada as well.

Initially in 1996, Dishwalla and The Refreshments opened for Goo Goo Dolls on a national tour. Dishwalla and The Refreshments then co-headlined their own tour later in the year. Overall, "Counting Blue Cars" earned the band a Billboard Award for "Best Rock Song" in 1996 as well as two ASCAP Awards for "Rock Track of the Year" in both 1996 and 1997. Pet Your Friends was eventually certified gold by the RIAA.

=== Moderate success with And You Think You Know What Life's About and label shifts (1998–2000) ===
Dishwalla released their second album in 1998, And You Think You Know What Life's About. Its lead single, "Once in a While", managed to appear on both the Modern Rock Tracks and Mainstream Rock Tracks charts. Both "Once in a While" and "Stay Awake" also respectively peaked at No. 38 and No. 80 on Canada's RPM 100 chart. Dishwalla toured with Sheryl Crow in promotion of the album, but Pendergast sustained an injury. Initially, Pete Maloney was brought on as a temporary drummer, but Maloney ended up joining the band on a full-time basis.

Despite some moderate success with And You Think You Know What Life's About, the album's singles did not match the popularity of "Counting Blue Cars"; thus, it led to the band being classified as a one-hit wonder of the 1990s. In 1999, the band appeared in a Charmed episode (season 2, episode 4). They performed a concert as themselves at "P3", a fictional night-club, during the episode. That same year, the band's song "Find Your Way Back Home" was featured on the soundtrack for the film American Pie. Ultimately, the band departed from A&M Records after their touring commitments were finished.

=== Opaline, Dishwalla, and departure of Richards (2001–2005) ===
In 2002, Dishwalla released their third album, Opaline, on Immergent Records. "Somewhere in the Middle" was released as the lead single, and it peaked at No. 25 on the Adult Pop Songs chart. It was also their only charting single in Australia as it peaked at No. 72 on the ARIA Chart. Dishwalla extensively toured before and after the album's release (from fall 2001 to summer 2003), as it was noted that they played 258 shows over 470 days.

The band released the self-titled album, Dishwalla, through Orphanage Records on March 15, 2005. Dishwalla went on a short tour throughout the summer of 2005, and the final shows took place in July of that year. It was ultimately the last album and tour with original vocalist Richards.

=== Reformation and Juniper Road (2008–2017) ===
After deciding to take a break in 2005, the band reformed and began touring in 2008 with a modified lineup consisting of bassist Alexander, guitarist Browning, keyboardist Wood, and drummer Pendergast. The lineup featured long-time friend Justin Fox, singer of the Santa Barbara band Tripdavon, as a "special guest vocalist". On March 15, 2009, Dishwalla was asked to play a benefit concert for Tea Fire victims Lance and Carla Hoffman, who were badly burned in fires which hit Santa Barbara in November 2008. In September 2012, Dishwalla let it be known that Richards had been permanently replaced with long-time friend and "special guest vocalist" Fox, as Richards focused on his solo albums and production career. In November 2012, in an episode of the TV show How I Met Your Mother, Dishwalla and their song "Counting Blue Cars" was written into a storyline.

In 2013 and 2014, the band toured extensively across the United States and the world. The band shared the stage with many other notable acts such as Eric Burdon, Collective Soul, Vertical Horizon, Tonic, Stroke 9, and Nine Days just in 2014 alone. Although there were initial doubts about Fox's ability to take over as frontman, his longevity in the band and continued touring commitments received support by the band's fans.

The year 2015 was the 20th anniversary of Dishwalla's chart-topping Pet Your Friends album that launched their careers. To commemorate the event, the band re-recorded their hit "Counting Blue Cars" with new vocalist Fox. On July 14, 2017, Dishwalla released their fifth studio album, Juniper Road. It was the band's first full-length studio release in 12 years. During the summer of 2017, the band joined the "Rockin' Road Trip '17" tour, sharing the stage with notable acts such as Fuel, Marcy Playground, Gin Blossoms, and others. Their summer dates included an appearance at the Santa Barbara Bowl on September 18, 2017, with Tears for Fears.

=== Alive and continued career (2018–present) ===
Dishwalla released a three-track EP, Alive, in 2022. The title track managed to peak at No. 31 on the Mainstream Rock chart, their first appearance on a Billboard chart in 20 years.

== Members ==
=== Current ===
- Rodney Browning Cravens – lead guitar, backing vocals (1990–2005, 2008–present)
- Scot Alexander – bass, backing vocals (1993–2005, 2008–present)
- George Pendergast – drums (1993–1998, 2008–present)
- Jim Wood – keyboards (1996–2005, 2008–present)
- Justin Fox – lead vocals (2008–present)

=== Former ===
- J. R. Richards – lead vocals, rhythm guitar, keyboards (1990–2005)
- Greg Kolanek – keyboards (1990–1994)
- Pete Maloney – drums (1998–2005)

== Discography ==
=== Studio albums ===
Year	Title	Label	Chart peaks			Certifications
Year	Title	Label	US	US Indie	US Heat	Certifications
1995	Pet Your Friends	A&M Records	89	—	1	RIAA: Gold
1998	And You Think You Know What Life's About	A&M Records	164	—	—	
2002	Opaline	Immergent Records	192	12	—	
2005	Dishwalla	Orphanage Records	—	—	—	
2017	Juniper Road	Pavement Music	—	—	—	

=== Demo albums ===
- By the Color (1991, as Life Talking)
- Dish (1993, as Dish)

=== EPs and live albums ===
- Gems (2001)
- Santa Claus Lane (2003)
- Live... Greetings from the Flow State (2003)
- Santa Claus Lane II (2004)
- Southeast Asia (2004)
- Alive (2022)

=== Singles ===
Year	Single	Peak chart positions								Certifications (sales thresholds)	Album
Year	Single	US	US Rock	US Pop	US Alt.	US Adult	AUS	CAN	CAN Rock	Certifications (sales thresholds)	Album
1994	"It's Going to Take Some Time"	—	—	—	—	—	—	—	—		If I Were a Carpenter
1995	"Haze"	—	—	—	—	—	—	—	—		Pet Your Friends
1996	"Counting Blue Cars"	15	2	4	1	5	—	16	5	RIAA: Gold; RIAA: Digital Gold (2022)	Pet Your Friends
1996	"Charlie Brown's Parents"	—	24	—	—	—	—	—	—		Pet Your Friends
1996	"Give"	—	—	—	—	26	—	36	—		Pet Your Friends
1998	"Once in a While"	—	17	—	20	—	—	38	—		And You Think You Know What Life's About
1998	"Stay Awake"	—	—	—	—	—	—	80	—		And You Think You Know What Life's About
2002	"Somewhere in the Middle"	—	—	—	—	25	72	—	—		Opaline
2002	"Angels or Devils"	—	—	—	—	—	—	—	—		Opaline
2005	"Collide"	—	—	—	—	—	—	—	—		Dishwalla
2017	"Give Me a Sign"	—	—	—	—	—	—	—	—		Juniper Road
2017	"Waiting on You, Love"	—	—	—	—	—	—	—	—		Juniper Road
2022	"Alive"	—	31	—	—	—	—	—	—		Alive
"—" denotes releases that did not chart

=== Non-album songs ===
- "It's Going to Take Some Time", featured on the 1994 Carpenters tribute album, If I Were a Carpenter
- "The Thrill Is Gone", featured on the 1995 soundtrack album, Things to Do in Denver When You're Dead
- "The Other Side of the World", featured on the 1997 compilation, MOM II: Music for Our Mother Ocean
- "Policy of Truth", featured on the 1998 Depeche Mode tribute album, For the Masses
- "Find Your Way Back Home", featured on the 1999 soundtrack album, American Pie

== See also ==
- 1990s in music
- List of alternative music artists
