= The Filthy Critic =

Website on contemporary movies

The Filthy Critic is a website run by Matt Weatherford under the pseudonym Filthy. From 1998 until 2011, starting again in 2013, the website offers reviews of contemporary movies.

Filthy's fictionalized private life frequently appears in the articles, including personal and often self-deprecating accounts of his life in the Colorado town of Arvada serving as a backdrop for his views toward a film. Recurring themes include his constantly shifting state of employment, his loving relationship with his wife, and his interaction with the locals at the "Arvada Tavern". Occasionally The Filthy Critic is "guest-written" by the author's fictional relatives, such as his intellectually disabled cousin Larry and his nerdy and virginal nephew, Jimmy.

The writing style is also notable for its vulgar language and often scathing remarks toward Hollywood. Particular criticism is directed at the creators of films the author considers emphasise special effects over character development, or which he accuses of pompous moralising. The ratings range from one to five "fingers".

Stephen King praised the website in his Entertainment Weekly column, saying, "I urge you, urge you, urge you to check him out at least once a month".

== Temporary death in 2003 ==
In 2003, the Critic's website posted an entry stating that he had been killed in a bicycle collision and that "He died the way he lived — wobbling aimlessly in the slow lane." The website later resurrected the persona.
