= Barney (franchise) =

American children's media franchise

- Logo used since 1996
- Created by: Sheryl Leach; Kathryn O'Rourke Parker; Dennis DeShazer
- Owners: The Lyons Group (1988–1994); Lyrick Studios (1994–2001); HIT Entertainment (2002–2012); Mattel (2012–present)
- Years: 1988–present

Films and television
- Film: Barney's Great Adventure (1998)
- Television series: Barney & Friends (1992–2010)
- Animated series: Barney's World (2024–2025)
- Direct-to-video: Barney & the Backyard Gang (1988—1991); Barney & the Backyard Gang: Waiting for Santa (1990); Barney's Magical Musical Adventure (1992); Barney's 1-2-3-4 Seasons (1996); Barney's Good Day Good Night (1997)

Theatrical presentations
- Musicals: Barney in Concert (1991); Barney Live in New York City (1994); Barney's Big Surprise (1998); Barney's Musical Castle (2001); Barney's Colorful World! Live! (2004)

Games
- Video game: Barney's Hide & Seek Game (1993)

Miscellaneous
- Theme park attraction: A Day in the Park with Barney (1995—2021)

Official website
- Official website

Barney is an American children's media franchise created by Sheryl Leach, Kathryn O'Rourke Parker and Dennis DeShazer, and currently owned by Mattel. It centers around the titular character Barney the Dinosaur, an anthropomorphic purple Tyrannosaurus rex who conveys educational messages through songs and small dance routines with a friendly, huggable and optimistic attitude. The franchise consists of three series: Barney & the Backyard Gang (1988—1991), a direct-to-video series consisting of only eight episodes; Barney & Friends (1992—2010), a television series that ran on PBS Kids; and Barney's World (2024–2025), a fully computer-animated series airing on Cartoon Network's Cartoonito, and which as of September 12, 2026, is streaming on HBO Max. A film adaptation, Barney's Great Adventure, was released theatrically in 1998, and a second film is in production at Mattel Studios and A24, with Daniel Kaluuya serving as director. The franchise is currently distributed by 9 Story Media Group, under license from Mattel Television.

While popular with its intended audience, Barney drew severely negative reaction from the older set, who mocked the title character in popular culture through song parodies and comedy routines such as being beaten up by NBA star Charles Barkley on a Saturday Night Live episode. The anti-Barney phenomenon is the basis of the 2022 Peacock documentary I Love You, You Hate Me. Barney has also received immense praise from parents for being a wholesome yet engaging franchise for children that delves into common, kid-friendly topics.

== Barney & the Backyard Gang ==
Barney & the Backyard Gang is an American direct-to-video series produced by The Lyons Group and released in periodic installments from August 29, 1988, to September 21, 1991. The series led to the launch of the children's television show, Barney & Friends, which aired on PBS Kids from April 6, 1992, to November 2, 2010. The first three episodes from 1988 and 1989 include Sandy Duncan as Michael and Amy's mother. (At the time, Duncan was starring on the NBC sitcom The Hogan Family.) Music for the Barney & the Backyard Gang videos was created by Stephen Bates Baltes and Phillip Parker (as with the television series), and Lory Lazarus wrote the first original song produced for Barney, "Friends Are Forever", sung by Duncan. In the first five videos, "I Love You" was sung at the beginning. Although "I Love You" was sung at the end of Barney Goes to School and Barney in Concert, and later frequently sung at the end of almost all the episodes of Barney & Friends, it was not featured at the end of Rock with Barney. The series was a regional success, but only a moderate success throughout the rest of the country. Then one day, in 1991, Larry Rifkin, then head of Connecticut Public Television, rented a Barney video for his daughter Leora. He liked the concept and talked to Leach about possibly putting Barney on television through the Public Broadcasting Service (PBS). Rock with Barney was the last video in the series before the television show debuted a year later. Also, only four of the kids from the videos (Michael, Derek, Tina, and Luci) were carried over to the television show.

== Television series ==
=== Barney & Friends ===
Barney & Friends ran on PBS Kids from April 6, 1992, to November 2, 2010 along with reruns until 2016. Episodes from seasons 1–9 (as well as seasons 12–13) last for 30 minutes, while episodes from seasons 10–11 (as well as season 14) are split into 15-minute segments. Like the Barney & the Backyard Gang episodes Barney Goes to School and Barney in Concert, "I Love You" was sung at the end of all episodes of Barney & Friends, with the exception of the primary segments of Seasons 10–11 and 14, which end with the characters singing "A Friend Like You" instead and Barney remaining alive. Reruns aired on Sprout from 2005–2015, and from December 17, 2018, to January 25, 2020, on Sprout's successor network, Universal Kids.

=== Barney's World ===
On February 13, 2023, Mattel announced that Barney would return as a computer-animated series, being co-produced by Mattel and the Canada-based animation studio Nelvana, with the deal also including the possibility of animated films and YouTube content to feature the character. The new series would aim for a 2024 delivery window. This was seen as part of a larger trend of Mattel successfully reviving franchises such as Monster High and Masters of the Universe, along with an overall development that included films based on its toys such as Hot Wheels, Magic 8 Ball, and Major Matt Mason.

On May 9, 2023, the title of the series was revealed as Barney's World and that Warner Bros. Discovery had acquired US television and streaming rights to the series. On October 14, 2024, the series would start streaming on Max and StackTV, and would air on Treehouse TV. The series will premiere on the Cartoon Network via Cartoonito on October 18, 2024. On the same day, Warner Bros. Discovery announced they had also acquired pay-TV rights in EMEA, APAC and Latin American territories. As with the United States, the show will air on Cartoonito channels or blocks while in Latin America the series will air on Discovery Kids. Select territories would also get episodes on YouTube as well as OSNtv Kidzone. Barney's World would premiere on Cartoonito UK on October 14, 2024.

== Films ==
=== Barney's Great Adventure ===
The first feature-length film, Barney's Great Adventure, follows Barney, along with three young children named Cody, Abby, and Marcella (played by Kyla Pratt), as they discover a magical egg in a barn. After learning that the egg is a dream maker, Barney and the gang must return the egg to the barn before it hatches. The film was written by Stephen White, directed by Steve Gomer, and produced by Sheryl Leach and Lyrick Studios. It was released by PolyGram Filmed Entertainment on March 27, 1998, at Radio City Music Hall in New York, USA, and worldwide on April 3, 1998, in North America at the height of Barney's popularity. The film was shot in Quebec, CA. The film received negative reviews from critics and was a box-office bomb, grossing $12 million against a budget of $15 million. This was the third and last film to be produced by Lyrick Studios before it was acquired by and folded into HIT Entertainment on June 6, 2001. It is also the only theatrical Barney film (several years until production for the second film), as all other Barney films were direct-to-video productions.

=== Untitled second Barney film ===
On October 18, 2019, Mattel Studios announced that a second Barney film was to be produced. On July 2, 2023, it was announced that the Barney film from Academy Award winner Daniel Kaluuya, through his production company 59%, would be aimed at adults and discuss the presumed disenchantment within the Millennial generation. An executive from Mattel said the adaptation would be "surrealistic" and similar to Adaptation and Being John Malkovich. On February 25, 2025, it was announced that Ayo Edebiri was in talks to star in and write the film for A24.

== Video game ==
Barney's Hide & Seek Game is a video game that was released for the Sega Genesis on June 1, 1993, by Sega in North America and in 1993 by Tec Toy in South America. It was based on the children's television series Barney & Friends, and it is the first and only video game in the Barney franchise. Educational concepts taught in the game include counting, matching, and problem solving. There is a self-play feature that guides the player to the objective without input from the player. The voice of Barney was recorded by his original voice actor Bob West, who also did it on the television show. There are more than one hundred words and two hundred phrases spoken by Barney. In this game, the objective is to move Barney around four themed levels and locate four children along with Baby Bop and five presents that are hiding throughout the level. Should the player find all the children along with Baby Bop and presents in different levels, they would be rewarded with a "special surprise". During the surprise, the purple balloon pop and confetti and streamers fall from above onto excited children, as well as Barney and Baby Bop. Players cannot lose in the game, even if they did not retrieve all the objects and find all the missing children in the level.

== Theme park attraction ==
A Day in the Park with Barney was a live children's show at Universal Studios Florida based on the children's television show, Barney & Friends, that opened in 1995 on the former site of The Bates Motel Set used in Psycho IV: The Beginning. It also featured “Barney’s Backyard,” a playground area where children could meet Barney during a post-show meet and greet at the Barney Theater. It was one of the few places where Barney's original voice actor Bob West was heard and one of Universal Studios' attempts to appeal to the younger generation.

On March 16, 2020, due to the ongoing worldwide outbreak of the COVID-19 pandemic and its spread to Florida, A Day in the Park with Barney had temporarily closed alongside the rest of the Universal Orlando Resort. It reopened during the resort's reopening in June 2020, but was closed again on August 9, 2020, which was temporary at the time. On February 3, 2021, Universal Orlando announced that the show was permanently closed, effective that day with attendance declining over the years. The entire Barney courtyard was removed of its theming and the indoor theater and stage was repurposed to DreamWorks Destination, an indoor meet-and-greet with characters from DreamWorks Animation franchises, such as Po from Kung Fu Panda, Princess Poppy from Trolls, King Julien from Madagascar, among others from each franchise.

A new Barney attraction is rumored to be opening at Mattel Adventure Park in Arizona and Kansas.

== Documentaries ==
=== Barney Celebrates Children ===
A documentary television special titled Barney Celebrates Children, which explores the positive influence of the titular character on children worldwide, debuted on PBS on December 4, 1994, and hosted by Maria Shriver.

=== I Love You, You Hate Me ===
A two-part documentary miniseries titled I Love You, You Hate Me, which centers on the anti-Barney phenomenon, was released on Peacock on October 12, 2022. It features interviews with various cast and crew of Barney & Friends and Barney & The Backyard Gang, alongside fans and critics of the Barney franchise, offering first-hand accounts of the Barney phenomenon. A trailer was released on September 28, 2022.
