= Barney's World =

Animated children's television series

- Genre: Fantasy; Preschool
- Based on: Barney by: Sheryl Leach; Kathryn O'Rourke Parker; Dennis DeShazer
- Developed by: Matt Sax; Duke Doyle; Leah Gotcsik
- Directed by: Adrian Thatcher
- Voices of: Jonathan Langdon; Bryn McAuley; Jonathan Tan; Jayd Deroché; Diana Tsoy; Ella Paciocco
- Opening theme: "Barney's World Main Title Theme", written by Ryan McLarnon & Robert Melamed
- Ending theme: "I Love You (I Love Me Too)", arranged by Joseph K. Phillips with additional arrangement by Caleigh Barker
- Composer: Nate Kreiswirth (score)
- Countries of origin: United States; Canada
- Original language: English
- No. of seasons: 1
- No. of episodes: 52

Production
- Executive producers: Michelle Mendelovitz; Josh Silverman; Athena Georgaklis; Doug Murphy; Mellany Welsh; Pam Westman
- Running time: 11 minutes
- Production companies: Mattel Television; Nelvana (Note: not including the I Love Me Too special)

Original release
- Network: HBO Max; Cartoon Network
- Release: October 14, 2024 – November 8, 2025

Barney's World is an animated television series that debuted on HBO Max on October 14, 2024. Produced by Mattel Television and Corus Entertainment's Nelvana, (Note: Excluding the "I Love Me Too" special, of which the animation services were provided by Kickstart Entertainment) it serves as a relaunch to the Barney franchise, which spawned its first television series Barney & Friends which was based on its direct-to-video predecessor Barney & the Backyard Gang. Unlike its predecessor, which was live-action, Barney's World is animated. The series is aimed at children from ages two to six.

== Plot ==
Set in a local playground, the show is centered around dinos Barney, Billy, and Baby Bop, and their three kid best friends. Throughout silly and imaginative adventures together, Barney helps kids explore big preschool emotions and shows them how to love themselves and others. The series highlights themes of love, community, and encouragement.

== Episode format ==
=== Opening sequence ===
The episodes open with the theme song and the title card before it dissolves into the playground. The children are seen doing an activity, occasionally relating to the episode's topic. They eventually cause Barney to appear from a purple tree by saying "Hey, Barney!".

=== Main sequence ===
Here, the main plot of the episode takes place. Barney and the children learn about the main topic of the episode, with Baby Bop and/or Billy appearing during the episode and a song themed relating to the subject featured in the series.

=== Closing sequence ===
In certain episodes, Barney concludes with the song "I Love You (I Love Me Too)", then the children say goodbye to him and leave. Barney thanks the viewer for helping him and adds "I love you!" while making a heart shape with his hands, before the credits roll.

== Characters ==
=== Dinosaurs ===
- Barney (voiced by Jonathan Langdon) is a purple and green T-Rex who can do magic.
- Baby Bop (voiced by Bryn McAuley) is a green and pink triceratops who is smart, funny, and can glow and Billy's younger sister.
- Billy (Note: Formerly BJ in the original series) (voiced by Jonathan Tan) is a yellow and green protoceratops and Baby Bop's older brother.

=== Humans ===
==== Children ====
- David (voiced by Jayd Deroché) is an African-American boy.
- Melissa "Mel" (voiced by Diana Tsoy) is a competitive Korean-Mexican-American girl.
- Vivian "Vivie" (voiced by Ella Paciocco) is a cheerful, creative, and artistic Caucasian blonde girl.
- Liam (voiced by Liam Quiring-Nkindi) is David's older brother.
- Lulu is David's baby sister.

==== Adults ====
- Ms. Lewis (voiced by Lisa Michelle Cornelius) is David's mom.
- Grady (Note: Formerly Mr. Boyd in the original series) (voiced by Eddie Glen)
- Nonna (voiced by Norma Dell'Agnese) is Vivie's grandmother.
- Luis (voiced by Alejandro Ampudia) is Mel's dad.
- Grace (voiced by Jean Yoon) is Mel's mom.

=== Other ===
- Bartholomew Bookworm (Note: Formerly Booker T. Bookworm in the original series) (voiced by Anthony Sardinha) is a library bookworm.
- Butterfly (voiced by Cory Doran) is a talking butterfly.
- Aster (voiced by Jonathan Tan) is a talking flower.
- Susan (voiced by Bryn McAuley) is a talking flower.
- Squirrel #1 (voiced by Ella Paciocco) is a talking squirrel.
- Pigeon (voiced by Diana Tsoy) is a talking pigeon.
- Squirrel #3 (voiced by Bryn McAuley) is a talking squirrel.
- Hermie (voiced by Elijah-Justus Lewis) is a hermit crab.

== Episodes ==
No.	Title	Directed by	Written by	Original release date	Cartoon Network air date	Prod. code	U.S. linear viewers (millions)
1	"The Floor is Grape Jelly"	Adrian Thatcher	Laura Zak	October 14, 2024	October 18, 2024	101	N/A
David has to be called home early to help his baby sister, so Barney plays a game which helps David learn that helping others can be just as fun as the game.
2	"I Lovey You"	Adrian Thatcher	Jim Nolan	October 14, 2024	October 18, 2024	102	N/A
David is scared of the dark, so Barney becomes a glow-in-the-dark dinosaur to help David's fears.
3	"Mel's Greatest Treasure"	Adrian Thatcher	Nick Lopez	October 14, 2024	October 25, 2024	103	N/A
After a big mess in the park during a game, Mel learns to clean up and care for the environment.
4	"One Ripe Tomato"	Adrian Thatcher	Jehan Madhani	October 14, 2024	October 25, 2024	104	N/A
The kids disagree over a ripe tomato, so Barney teaches the kids about sharing.
5	"Barney's Big Race"	Adrian Thatcher	Laura Zak	October 14, 2024	November 1, 2024	105	N/A
Barney creates a Go-Kart race event for the kids, but Vivie keeps getting upset over losing the race. She later learns that everything it not always about winning.
6	"The Brave Truth"	Adrian Thatcher	Noelle Wright	October 21, 2024	November 1, 2024	106	N/A
Barney encourages Vivie to tell the truth after she accidentally breaks Mel's new toy airplane.
7	"Red Light Stop Green Light Go"	Adrian Thatcher	Niki Lytton	October 21, 2024	November 8, 2024	107	N/A
Mel wants to do a scooter trick and can't stop, making her feel tired and pushing her body too far. Barney teachers her that she has to listen to what her body says.
8	"Big Bigger Best"	Adrian Thatcher	Scott Gray	October 21, 2024	November 8, 2024	108	N/A
David is sad that he is too small than his big brother, so Barney makes him bigger, but David feels he loves himself just the way he is.
9	"Practice Makes Purple"	Adrian Thatcher	Jim Nolan	October 21, 2024	November 15, 2024	109	N/A
Vivie tries soccer, but finds out she's not good at it. Barney later teaches Vivie that practice makes perfect.
10	"Team Mateys"	Adrian Thatcher	Laura Zak	October 21, 2024	November 15, 2024	110	N/A
During a game of pirates, Mel doesn't listen to her team mates, so Barney teaches her that listening to others is important, and that it makes a great team.
11	"Save the Garden"	Adrian Thatcher	Noelle Wright	January 13, 2025	January 17, 2025	111	N/A
The kids play a fun game to save the community garden, and learn small things make big changes.
12	"Dances with Goblins"	Adrian Thatcher	Nick Lopez	January 13, 2025	January 17, 2025	112	N/A
Barney has to play two games at once when the kids disagree, and he's having a hard time about switching back and forth.
13	"Missing Mel"	Adrian Thatcher	Scott Gray	January 13, 2025	January 24, 2025	113	N/A
Vivie and David feel upset after Mel is away for a broken arm. Barney creates a fun game to help the kids feel better when Mel gets back.
14	"The Castaway Crew"	Adrian Thatcher	Jim Nolan	January 13, 2025	January 24, 2025	114	N/A
Barney creates a game to help Mel embrace the abilities of her recently broken arm.
15	"Drawing Attention"	Adrian Thatcher	Jennifer Skelly	January 13, 2025	January 31, 2025	115	N/A
Vivie fakes an injury after she feels ignored over her chalk drawing, so Barney teaches Vivie that she has to speak up for what she needs.
16	"Worth the Wait"	Adrian Thatcher	Nick Lopez	January 13, 2025	January 31, 2025	116	N/A
Mel learns that some things take time because her healed arm doesn't work the way it should.
17	"The Big Spill"	Adrian Thatcher	Roxy Simons	January 13, 2025	February 7, 2025	117	N/A
Vivie's painting gets ruined, so Barney creates a game to help her learn healthy ways and manage big feelings.
18	"Nature Chat"	Adrian Thatcher	Lexie Kahanovitz	January 13, 2025	February 7, 2025	118	N/A
Mel learns to respect nature and take care of the environment thanks to Barney.
19	"The Great Grateful Scavenger Hunt"	Adrian Thatcher	Jim Nolan	January 13, 2025	February 14, 2025	119	N/A
To help Mel focus on what she is grateful for, Barney creates a scavenger hunt.
20	"David the Hero"	Adrian Thatcher	Niki Lytton	January 13, 2025	February 14, 2025	120	N/A
David feels quiet playing superheroes, until Barney creates a superhero game, and David's quietness saves the day.
21	"Making Magic"	Adrian Thatcher	Jim Nolan	April 7, 2025	April 11, 2025	121	N/A
A magic trick Barney is trying to do misfires, making him frustrated. Vivie, Mel and David teach Barney to solve his problem in a new way.
22	"Birds of a Feather"	Adrian Thatcher	Nick Lopez	April 7, 2025	April 11, 2025	122	N/A
Vivie wants to imagine being a bird, so Barney helps her imagine what it fells like to be a bird.
23	"Bigger Wheels"	Adrian Thatcher	Annabeth Bondor-Stone & Connor White	April 7, 2025	April 18, 2025	123	N/A
David outgrows his bigger bike and Barney helps him accept that it's time to now ride a bigger bike.
24	"Every Little Thing"	Adrian Thatcher	Lexie Kahanovitz	April 7, 2025	April 18, 2025	124	N/A
Vivie, Mel, and David learn from Barney that small acts of kindness can help big things.
25	"Barney's Birthday"	Adrian Thatcher	Matt Sax & Duke Doyle	April 7, 2025	April 25, 2025	125	N/A
For Barney's birthday, the kids make a quilt which includes favorite things about him.
26	"Finders Not Keepers"	Adrian Thatcher	Nick Lopez	April 7, 2025	April 25, 2025	126	N/A
Mel realizes that her sunglasses isn't hers, so she returns them to Grady with the help of Barney.
27	"The Snuzzleberry Snatcher"	Adrian Thatcher	Annabeth Bondor-Stone & Connor White	April 7, 2025	May 2, 2025	127	N/A
A cactus pops Vivie's ball, and Barney and the kids go on an adventure about nature.
28	"It Takes Three"	Adrian Thatcher	Ernie Bustamante	April 7, 2025	May 2, 2025	128	N/A
Barney helps Baby Bop when she feels left out of a game and finds something else to enjoy.
29	"The Missing Valentine"	Adrian Thatcher	Niki Lytton	April 7, 2025	May 9, 2025	129	N/A
Vivie forgets to make a valentine for someone, so the kids and Barney go on a quest to figure out who.
30	"Too Far"	Adrian Thatcher	Susan Kim	April 7, 2025	May 9, 2025	130	N/A
Mel is displeased with Baby Bop's playful teasing, so Barney teaches her how to speak up for herself.
31	"Someone's Missing"	Adrian Thatcher	Jim Nolan	September 1, 2025	September 5, 2025	131	N/A
David gets a cold and has to stay inside, so Barney and the kids cheer him up by playing with him from outside of his window.
32	"Lights Out"	Adrian Thatcher	Lexie Kahanovitz	September 1, 2025	September 5, 2025	132	N/A
Barney and the kids help Vivie to still enjoy nighttime fun with help from the community after her evening plans are ruined thanks to a blackout.
33	"A Work of Parts"	Adrian Thatcher	Jonathan Hernandez	September 1, 2025	September 12, 2025	133	N/A
Vivie learns that because she is small, she can still have an effect on the park.
34	"Time To Try"	Adrian Thatcher	Nick Lopez	September 1, 2025	September 12, 2025	134	N/A
Mel's friends are unwilling to try kimchi, so Barney teaches them how to try different things.
35	"One More Game"	Adrian Thatcher	Julius Harper	September 1, 2025	September 19, 2025	135	N/A
David plays video games too much, so Barney helps him discover the value about balancing video games with physical games.
36	"Forever and Always"	Adrian Thatcher	Rodney Stringfellow	September 1, 2025	September 19, 2025	136	N/A
Vivie learns about the power of unconditional love through an Enchanted Garden magic trip.
37	"It's a Jungle Out There"	Adrian Thatcher	Jim Nolan	September 1, 2025	September 26, 2025	137	N/A
David accidentally loses his friends' magical explorer mobile during an Enchanted Jungle trek, and Barney teaches him how to learn from mistakes.
38	"Big Energy Billy"	Adrian Thatcher	Michael Rabb	September 1, 2025	September 26, 2025	138	N/A
Barney, Vivie, Mel, and David help Billy re-charge so he can keep playing with them.
39	"Everyday Mother's Day"	Adrian Thatcher	Lexie Kahanovitz	September 1, 2025	October 3, 2025	139	N/A
David and his big brother Liam want to help make a special gift for their mother during Mother's Day, and learns how to be observant and taking care of their baby sister so their Mom can have the day off.
40	"Father's Day Road Trip"	Adrian Thatcher	Rick Suvalle	September 1, 2025	October 3, 2025	140	N/A
Mel and her dad's road trip is cancelled, so Mel takes her upset dad on an imaginary road trip in order to spend time together.
41	"Nonna on the Move"	Adrian Thatcher	Annabeth Bondor-Stone & Connor White	November 3, 2025	November 7, 2025	141	N/A
Vivie learns to care for Nonna in her declining mobility.
42	"Just Like Liam"	Adrian Thatcher	Julius Harper	November 3, 2025	November 7, 2025	142	N/A
David learns about the importance of being himself after he wants to be like his brother, Liam.
43	"The Brighter Side"	Adrian Thatcher	Sam Bissonnette	November 3, 2025	November 14, 2025	143	N/A
Mel learns to adopt a way to think of overcome challenges and help an injured fairy.
44	"Baby Bop Blues"	Adrian Thatcher	Nick Lopez	November 3, 2025	November 14, 2025	144	N/A
Barney teaches Baby Bop how to express her feelings so everyone can continue to have fun.
45	"Just My Style"	Adrian Thatcher	Adam Wilson & Melanie Wilson LaBracio	November 3, 2025	November 21, 2025	145	N/A
Mel and Vivie learn that it's okay to be different during a trip to the Castleverse.
46	"Eyes on the Surprise"	Adrian Thatcher	Jonathan Hernandez	November 3, 2025	November 21, 2025	146	N/A
Barney teaches David to control himself when it comes to surprises, and even though it might be challenging, it's possible.
47	"Silly Time"	Adrian Thatcher	Rick Suvalle	November 3, 2025	November 28, 2025	147	N/A
Mel makes a funny sound too much and Barney teaches her a proper time for certain behaviors.
48	"Sticky Feelings"	Adrian Thatcher	Lexie Kahanovitz	November 3, 2025	November 28, 2025	148	N/A
David accidentally makes Vivie upset, so Barney helps her process her anger and forgive David so she can keep playing with her friends.
49	"The Pizza Extravaganza"	Adrian Thatcher	Nick Lopez	November 3, 2025	December 5, 2025	149	N/A
With the help of the community, Vivie and Nonna can help manage everything.
50	"Back on Board"	Adrian Thatcher	Sam Bissonnette	November 3, 2025	December 5, 2025	150	N/A
Mel is worried about riding a skateboard again after a previous injury, and Barney helps her discover what she needs to feel safe for skateboarding.
51	"Trash to Treasure"	Adrian Thatcher	Matt Sax & Duke Doyle	November 3, 2025	December 12, 2025	151	N/A
Barney creates an original game that helps the kids recycle, and the rest of the community is inspired and does the same too.
52	"The Good Apology"	Adrian Thatcher	Julius Harper	November 3, 2025	December 12, 2025	152	N/A
Mel learns to apologize and mean it because she accidentally makes a big accident.

=== Special (2025) ===
No.	Title	Directed by	Written by	Original release date	Cartoon Network/HBO Max air date	U.S. linear viewers (millions)
1	"I Love Me Too"	Gordon Crum	Jim Nolan	January 31, 2025 (YouTube)	TBA	N/A
Barney and his friends go on an adventure through imagination to help Baby Bop get her glowing powers back.

=== Meet Barney (2024) ===
No.	Title	YouTube/Cartoon Network release date	HBO Max release date
1	"Let's Meet BARNEY" "Barney's Intro"	September 4, 2024 (YouTube); October 18, 2024 (Cartoon Network)	TBA
2	"Let's Meet BABY BOP" "Baby Bop's Intro"	September 5, 2024 (YouTube); November 1, 2024 (Cartoon Network)	TBA
3	"Let's Meet BILLY" "Billy's Intro"	September 6, 2024 (YouTube); October 25, 2024 (Cartoon Network)	TBA
4	"Clean Up" "Meet Barney: Clean Up"	September 20, 2024 (YouTube); September 30, 2024 (Cartoon Network)	TBA
5	"Check In on Your Body" "Meet Barney: Check In on Your Body"	September 27, 2024 (YouTube); October 1, 2024 (Cartoon Network)	TBA
6	"Anger" "Meet Barney: Anger"	October 2, 2024 (Cartoon Network); October 4, 2024 (YouTube)	TBA
7	"Sharing" "Meet Barney: Sharing"	October 3, 2024 (Cartoon Network); October 25, 2024 (YouTube)	TBA
8	"Big Happy Feeling" "Meet Barney: Big Happy Feeling"	October 4, 2024 (Cartoon Network); November 1, 2024 (YouTube)	TBA
9	"Make It Myself" "Meet Barney: Make It Myself"	October 7, 2024 (Cartoon Network); November 7, 2024 (YouTube)	TBA
10	"A Big Sad" "Meet Barney: A Big Sad"	October 8, 2024 (Cartoon Network); November 7, 2024 (YouTube)	TBA
11	"Little by Little" "Meet Barney: Little by Little"	October 9, 2024 (Cartoon Network); November 22, 2024 (YouTube)	TBA
12	"That Dizzy Feeling" "Meet Barney: That Dizzy Feeling"	October 10, 2024 (Cartoon Network); November 7, 2024 (YouTube)	TBA
13	"Here If You Need Me" "Meet Barney: Here If You Need Me"	October 11, 2024 (Cartoon Network); November 7, 2024 (YouTube)	TBA

=== Dino Dance Party (2025) ===
No.	Title	YouTube release date	Cartoon Network/HBO Max release date
1	"Dance Away the Grumpies"	September 6, 2025	TBA
2	"Baby Bop's Dance Partner"	September 13, 2025	TBA
3	"Billy Finds His Dancing Shoes"	September 20, 2025	TBA
4	"Scoot, Skate, Dance"	September 27, 2025	TBA
5	"Never Too Little or Too Big to Dance" "Never Too Little (Or Big!) to Dance"	October 4, 2025	TBA
6	"Billy's Body Check-in Dance"	October 11, 2025	TBA
7	"The Clean Up Dance"	October 18, 2025	TBA
8	"The Feelings Dance"	October 25, 2025	TBA
9	"Hoops and Whoops"	November 1, 2025	TBA
10	"Up, Up, and Okay!"	November 8, 2025	TBA

== Production ==
=== Development ===
Originally in October 2015, a revival of Barney & Friends was announced to premiere in 2017, but it did not come to fruition. However, during Mattel's 2021 Virtual Analyst Day Presentation, Barney was included to be a "new series in development" by Mattel Television. On February 13, 2023, Mattel announced that it would relaunch the Barney franchise with an animated series set to debut in 2024. Announced to be a collaboration between Mattel Television and Corus Entertainment’s Nelvana, Fred Soulie and Christopher Keenan for Mattel Television and Colin Bohm, Doug Murphy and Pam Westman for Nelvana were revealed to be the show's executive producers. The relaunch is set to introduce audiences to the world of Barney through music-filled adventures centered on love, community, and encouragement.

The title of the series, Barney's World, was officially revealed on May 9, 2023. On September 4, 2024, it was announced that Michelle Mendelovitz and Josh Silverman would executive produce the series on behalf of Mattel and while Doug Murphy and Pam Westman remained as executive producers on behalf of Nelvana, Athena Georgaklis and Mellany Welsh were also added on behalf of the latter company.

Animation for the series is done by Kickstart Animation in Vancouver and Digital Dimension Entertainment Group in Quebec, while pre-production and storyboarding is done at Nelvana.

== Release ==
Upon the initial announcement, Mattel confirmed that the relaunch will be available for streaming, and broadcast partners were to be announced later in 2023. On May 9, 2023, it was officially revealed that the series would air on Cartoonito and stream on Max. Executive Producer Pam Westman confirmed that the series would air on the Treehouse TV network in Canada, with it later being announced by Corus Entertainment, parent of Nelvana, on June 5, 2024 that the series was set to debut on the network. During Mattel's 2024 Virtual Analyst Day Presentation, Chief Brand Officer Lisa McKnight mentioned that the series is set to debut in late-Fall 2024.

In August 2024, footage of the series was leaked online before an exact release date was announced and before footage was officially unveiled. Victoria Ramirez, a director of global marketing and music distribution for Mattel Television, publicly confirmed on August 28, 2024 (via Instagram) that the series is set to launch in October 2024 (before retracting her public comment and reducing its privacy). On September 4, 2024 it was officially announced that the series was set to premiere on October 14, 2024 on Max followed by a linear premiere on Cartoon Network’s Cartoonito block starting October 18, 2024. "Select" episodes of Barney's World are also available on YouTube, where the series premiere streamed early on October 11, 2024 in specific countries. Barney's World also launched on Cartoonito in EMEA and APAC regions, and Discovery Kids in LATAM. In Canada, Barney's World also premiered on October 14, 2024 on Treehouse and is available to stream on STACKTV. Footage of the series was officially unveiled on September 4, 2024 via a trailer and character introductions of Barney, Baby Bop and Billy.

A 23-minute special titled Barney's World: I Love Me Too premiered first on YouTube on January 31, 2025.

A short series titled Barney's World: Dino Dance Party premiered first on YouTube on September 6, 2025.

This series was temporarily released in TVNZ+ from October 26, 2025 to January 31, 2026, during the Mattel 80th anniversary event.

== Reception ==
Upon the initial announcement of the animated series, the initial first look at the redesigned Barney drew controversies. Jessica Zucha, who portrayed Tina on Barney & the Backyard Gang and the first 2 seasons of Barney & Friends, and Dianna De La Garza, the mother of Demi Lovato, who portrayed Angela on Barney & Friends, disapproved of the change.
