= Barney's 1-2-3-4 Seasons =

- Directed by: Ben Vaughn
- Written by: Stephen White
- Produced by: Jeff Gittle
- Starring: Bob West; David Joyner; Patty Wirtz; Jeff Brooks; John David Bennett, II; Hope Cervantes; Jessica Hinojosa; Erica Reynolds
- Edited by: McKee Smith
- Music by: Bob Singleton
- Production companies: Lyons Partnership, L.P.
- Distributed by: Lyons Partnership, L.P.
- Release date: August 6, 1996
- Running time: 45 minutes
- Country: United States
- Language: English

Barney's 1-2-3-4 Seasons is the sixth Barney & Friends home video. It was originally released on August 6, 1996. This video features a collection of traditional children's songs and school songs, and it is also compatible with Actimates Barney.

== Plot ==
BJ wants to play outdoor games and sports, but it never seems to be the right season of the year. Barney and his friends use magical jars and imagination to help BJ experience spring, summer, fall and winter all in one day.

== Cast ==
- Barney (voice) – Bob West
- Barney (body costume) - David Joyner
- BJ (voice) – Patty Wirtz
- BJ (body costume) - Jeff Brooks
- Maria – Jessica Hinojosa
- Tosha – Hope Cervantes
- Rebecca – Erica Reynolds
- Shawn – John David Bennett, II

== Songs ==
1. "Barney Theme Song"
2. "A-Tisket, A-Tasket"
3. "I Just Can't Wait"
4. "Growing"
5. "Taking Turns"
6. "The Raindrop Song"
7. "A Silly Hat"
8. "What a Baseball Day!"
9. "He Waded in the Water"
10. "I Like Autumn"
11. "Go Round and Round the Village"
12. "Winter's Wonderful"
13. "Sledding, Sledding"
14. "I Just Can't Wait" (Reprise)
15. "I Love You"
