= List of Barney & Friends episodes =

Barney & Friends is an American children's television series that originally ran on PBS Kids from April 6, 1992, to November 2, 2010.

== Series overview ==
Season	Episodes	Originally released	
Season	Episodes	First released	Last released
1	30	April 6, 1992	May 15, 1992
2	18	September 27, 1993	October 20, 1993
3	20	February 27, 1995	October 6, 1995
4	20	November 3, 1997	November 28, 1997
5	20	November 2, 1998	April 16, 1999
6	20	November 1, 1999	April 14, 2000
7	20	September 2, 2002	November 22, 2002
8	20	September 15, 2003	May 14, 2004
9	20	September 6, 2004	May 13, 2005
10	20	September 18, 2006	October 13, 2006
11	20	September 17, 2007	October 12, 2007
12	10	September 15, 2008	September 26, 2008
13	10	September 7, 2009	September 18, 2009
14	20	October 4, 2010	November 2, 2010

== Episodes ==
=== Season 1 (1992) ===
No. overall	No. in season	Title	Educational theme	Cast of children	Original release date	Prod. code
1	1	"The Queen Of Make-Believe"	Imagination	Michael; Min; Shawn; Tina	April 6, 1992	101
Min becomes the "Queen of Make-Believe" and Barney shows the kids different ways to use their imaginations. Note: First appearances of Min, Shawn, Michael, Tina, and the Barney Bag.
2	2	"My Family's Just Right For Me"	Family members	Derek; Kathy; Luci; Michael; Tina	April 7, 1992	102
Kathy is sad because her family is too small. Barney and the kids explore what make families wonderful. Note: First appearances of Derek, Luci, Kathy and Baby Bop.
3	3	"Playing It Safe"	Safety	Derek; Kathy; Luci; Min	April 8, 1992	103
Barney, Baby Bop, and the kids learn all about safety from traffic lights to dealing with strangers.
4	4	"Hop To It!"	Exercise	Luci; Michael; Min; Tina	April 9, 1992	104
Tina is upset that she cannot do a basketball trick as well as her sister Luci. Barney and his friends learn about exercise.
5	5	"Eat, Drink And Be Healthy!"	Eating healthy foods	Luci; Michael; Shawn; Tina	April 10, 1992	105
Barney and his friends learn about the four food groups and how healthy food is good for one's body.
6	6	"Four Seasons Day"	Seasons	Luci; Michael; Min; Shawn	April 13, 1992	106
Barney and the kids enjoy the fun of all four seasons in one day.
7	7	"The Treasure Of Rainbow Beard"	Colors; Shapes	Derek; Kathy; Michael; Min	April 14, 1992	107
When "Rainbow Beard the Pirate" sends the group on a treasure hunt, Barney and friends explore the colors and shapes around everyone.
8	8	"Going Places!"	Transportation	Derek; Kathy; Michael; Min (cameo); Tina	April 15, 1992	108
After Min leaves for a trip to her grandmother's house, Barney takes the kids on a trip to "Imagination City".
9	9	"Caring Means Sharing"	Sharing	Derek; Kathy; Min; Shawn	April 16, 1992	109
When Kathy and Min fight over whose turn it is to play with Barney, their purple friend shows them that sharing is wonderful.
10	10	"Down On Barney's Farm"	Farm animals	Derek; Luci; Shawn; Tina	April 17, 1992	110
Barney and his friends take a make believe trip to Farmer Henderson's Farm (the playground with farm props) and learn about different farm animals.
11	11	"What's That Shadow?"	Dealing with fears	Derek; Kathy; Min; Shawn	April 20, 1992	111
After a storm drives the kids inside, Barney helps them chase their fears of things away. Shawn gets over his fear of dogs by meeting Min's puppy.
12	12	"Happy Birthday, Barney!" "Barney's Birthday"	Birthdays	Derek (cameo); Kathy; Luci (cameo); Michael (cameo); Min; Shawn; Tina	April 21, 1992	112
It's Barney's birthday, and the kids throw a birthday party for him.
13	13	"Alphabet Soup!"	Alphabet; Letters	Derek; Kathy; Min; Tina	April 22, 1992	113
To help Kathy and Min learn how to read, Derek writes a mystery word, one letter at a time. As he does this, Barney and the kids do activities and sing songs using each letter.
14	14	"Our Earth, Our Home"	The environment	Derek; Luci; Michael; Tina	April 23, 1992	114
It's Earth Week at school, and Barney teaches his friends about ways to save the Earth.
15	15	"Let's Help Mother Goose!" "Barney Rhymes with Mother Goose"	Mother Goose rhymes	Kathy; Michael; Min; Shawn	April 24, 1992	115
When a bookworm is eating Mother Goose's book, Barney and his friends help her rewrite her famous rhymes.
16	16	"Be A Friend"	Friendship	Derek; Kathy; Michael; Min (cameo); Tosha	April 27, 1992	116
When a new girl named Tosha comes to school, Barney and the others learn about friendship. Derek and Michael disagree about who gets to keep a picture of Barney they made together, however. Note: First appearance of Tosha.
17	17	"I Just Love Bugs"	Bugs and insects	Derek; Luci; Michael; Tina	April 28, 1992	117
Things have gone buggy as Barney and the kids learn about bugs and insects.
18	18	"When I Grow Up..."	Jobs	Derek; Kathy; Min; Shawn	April 29, 1992	118
Shawn is scared to get a job when he grows up, so Barney and his friends use pretend play to show how jobs aren't scary, and can even be fun.
19	19	"1-2-3-4-5 Senses!"	The five senses	Derek (cameo); Kathy; Luci; Michael; Tina	April 30, 1992	119
When Luci's blind friend Patty arrives, Barney and the kids learn about the five senses and how they help everyone explore the world.
20	20	"Practice Makes Music"	Music; Musical instruments	Luci; Michael; Tina; Tosha	May 1, 1992	120
Michael is nervous and anxious about performing at a concert in the evening. Barney and his friends learn about various music styles, instruments, and that a little practice goes a long way.
21	21	"Hi, Neighbor!"	Neighborhoods	Derek; Luci; Shawn; Tina	May 4, 1992	121
Barney and his friends explore their neighborhoods through pretend play. They even take Baby Bop through pretend neighborhood buildings.
22	22	"A Camping We Will Go!"	Camping; Forest safety	Kathy; Luci; Michael; Min; Tosha	May 5, 1992	122
When the kids want to go camping, Barney takes them on a camping trip, using the playground as their campsite.
23	23	"A Splash Party, Please" "Barney's Best Manners"	Practicing good manners	Derek; Michael; Min; Tina	May 6, 1992	123
Barney and his friends learn how manners are important while having an after school picnic.
24	24	"Carnival Of Numbers"	Numbers	Kathy; Luci; Shawn; Tosha	May 7, 1992	124
Barney puts on a "Carnival of Numbers" for his friends so they can have fun with numbers.
25	25	"A World Of Music"	Countries; Music around the world	Derek; Luci; Min; Shawn	May 8, 1992	125
After learning about different countries on a globe, Barney takes the kids on a trip to visit his friends in Scotland, Israel, Africa, China, and Mexico.
26	26	"Doctor Barney Is Here!"	Good healthy habits	Derek; Kathy; Michael; Tosha	May 11, 1992	126
Kathy is scared to go to the doctor, so Barney and the others take her on a pretend doctor visit. Barney teaches the kids "The Feel Good Rules".
27	27	"Oh, What A Day!"	Feelings and emotions	Luci; Min; Shawn; Tina	May 12, 1992	127
Tina is having a bad day after losing her kitten, so Barney and the kids try to cheer her up.
28	28	"Home Sweet Homes"	Homes for animals and people	Kathy; Michael; Tina; Tosha	May 13, 1992	128
Barney and his friends learn all about different homes for people and animals.
29	29	"Hola, Mexico!"	Mexico	Derek; Luci; Min; Shawn	May 14, 1992	129
After Luci receives a letter from her grandfather, Barney and the kids decide to have a fiesta in the classroom.
30	30	"Everyone Is Special"	Being special	Derek; Kathy; Luci; Michael; Min; Shawn; Tina; Tosha	May 15, 1992	130
Barney receives a surprise in the mail and shows his friends how being themselves is important.

=== Season 2 (1993) ===
No. overall	No. in season	Title	Educational theme	Cast of children	Original release date	Prod. code
31	1	"Falling For Autumn!"	Autumn	David; Michael; Shawn; Tina; Tosha	September 27, 1993	201
Barney and friends have fun celebrating fall and preparing for a school "Fall Festival".
32	2	"Grandparents Are Grand!"	Grandparents	Derek; Kathy; Min; Tina	September 28, 1993	202
When Derek's granddad and Kathy's nana visit the school, Barney and the kids learn how grandparents are special people.
33	3	"May I Help You?"	Helping others	Derek; Min; Shawn; Tosha	September 29, 1993	203
The kids take Barney and Baby Bop through a pretend day at school.
34	4	"Red, Blue And Circles Too!"	Colors; Shapes	Kathy; Michael; Tina; Tosha	September 30, 1993	204
Tosha places Barney in a cardboard jack-in-the-box. Barney and the kids make paintings with sponges to accommodate Tina, who has broken her arm. Barney teaches Baby Bop how to form a circle, square, and triangle, then everyone plays with hula hoops. Michael demonstrates mixing colors for the others. Everyone searches for items of a certain color, then they perform a flag march.
35	5	"Honk! Honk! A Goose On The Loose!"	Mother Goose rhymes	Derek; Julie; Min; Shawn	October 1, 1993	205
When Mother Goose's goose, Clarence, goes missing, Barney and the kids help her find him. Note: First appearance of Julie.
36	6	"Hoo's In The Forest?"	Forest animals Animal sounds	Kathy; Michael; Tina; Tosha	October 4, 1993	206
Barney takes his friends to a forest and teaches them about different animals.
37	7	"I Can Do That!"	Trying new things	Derek; Kathy; Min; Shawn	October 5, 1993	207
Barney, Baby Bop, and the kids show off things that they can do.
38	8	"Grown-Ups For A Day!"	Jobs	Derek; Min; Shawn; Tina	October 6, 1993	208
Barney and his friends explore different careers through pretend play.
39	9	"Picture This!"	Arts and crafts	Julie; Michael; Shawn; Tosha	October 7, 1993	209
Barney and the kids have fun with art. Author Tomie dePaola visits.
40	10	"Look At Me, I'm 3!"	Things associated with 3	Derek; Julie; Kathy; Tina	October 8, 1993	210
Baby Bop celebrates her third birthday and Barney throws a birthday party for her with things that do with the number 3. Note: First appearance of BJ.
41	11	"The Exercise Circus!" "Barney's Exercise Circus"	Exercise; Circus	Derek; Michael; Min; Tina; Tosha; Luci (guest)	October 11, 1993	211
Barney and friends perform in their own "Exercise Circus". Note: Final appearance of Luci.
42	12	"My Favorite Things"	Favorite things	David; Kathy; Min; Shawn	October 12, 1993	212
When Kathy and the others bring teddy bears to school, Barney and the kids have fun with some of their favorite things. Note: First appearance of David.
43	13	"The Dentist Makes Me Smile"	Dental hygiene	Derek; Kathy; Shawn; Tosha	October 13, 1993	213
Shawn feels a loose tooth, so Barney and the kids learn about teeth and how to take care of them, and stage a pretend dentist visit to make him less worried about visiting the dentist.
44	14	"Stop, Look And Be Safe!"	Safety	Derek; Michael; Tina; Tosha	October 14, 1993	214
Barney and friends learn about different safety rules including ones about crossing streets and playing on the playground.
45	15	"An Adventure In Make Believe" "Let's Pretend with Barney"	Imagination	David; Min; Shawn	October 15, 1993	215
BJ needs to save a princess in a make-believe jungle. Barney and the kids show him how to use his imagination.
46	16	"The Alphabet Zoo" "Barney's Alphabet Zoo"	Alphabet; Zoo animals	Derek; Jason; Julie; Shawn; Tina	October 18, 1993	216
Using letters from A to Z, Barney and his friends set up an "Animal Alphabet Zoo". Julie's aunt Molly visits the classroom. Note: First appearance of Jason.
47	17	"Having Tens Of Fun!" "Barney's Parade of Numbers"	Things associated with 10	Kathy; Michael; Min; Tosha	October 19, 1993	217
Barney's friend Mr. Tenagain comes to visit and the gang has fun with the number 10. Note: Final appearance of Michael.
48	18	"A Very Special Delivery!" "Families are Special"	Being special	David; Kathy; Min; Shawn; Tosha	October 20, 1993	218
While waiting for Tosha's parents to arrive with a special surprise, Barney and the kids learn about what makes everyone special. Singer Ella Jenkins visits and shares a couple songs with the group. Note: Final appearance of David.

=== Season 3 (1995) ===
No. overall	No. in season	Title	Educational theme	Cast of children	Original release date	Prod. code
49	1	"Shawn & The Beanstalk"	Plants	David; Jason; Min; Shawn; Tosha	February 27, 1995	301
Barney and his friends learn about plants. Note: First appearance of The Adventure Screen.
50	2	"If The Shoe Fits..."	Shoes	Carlos; Juan; Julie; Min	February 28, 1995	302
BJ and Baby Bop decide that it is time for them to get new shoes. Meanwhile, Barney and the kids learn about various types of shoes. Note: First appearances of Carlos and Juan.
51	3	"Room For Everyone"	Rooms in a house	Carlos; Kathy; Shawn; Tosha	March 1, 1995	303
Barney and his friends pretend to explore different types of rooms in a house. Note: First appearance of Stella the Storyteller.
52	4	"I Can Be A Firefighter!"	Firefighters	Jason; Julie; Kathy; Tosha	March 2, 1995	304
BJ decides that he wants to become a firefighter and announces it to his friends. Firefighter Frank visits the gang and teaches them all about fire safety in the home.
53	5	"Shopping For A Surprise!"	Shopping and planning a party	Carlos; Julie; Min; Shawn	March 3, 1995	305
To prepare for a surprise party in the classroom, Barney and Baby Bop shop for different items they will need.
54	6	"Any Way You Slice It"	Cultures; Different types of bread	Carlos; Juan; Kathy; Min	June 7, 1995	306
Barney and his friends check out booths at their school's "International Festival".
55	7	"Twice Is Nice!"	Meeting new friends Working together	Alissa; Ashley; Julie; Shawn; Tosha	June 8, 1995	307
Barney and his friends get to meet some new friends, twin sisters Ashley and Alissa. All of the kids get to know each other better by helping out with a scavenger hunt. Note: First appearances of Ashley and Alissa.
56	8	"On The Move" "Barney's Making New Friends"	Friendship	Kathy; Kenneth; Min; Tosha; Stephen (cameo); Derek (guest); Tina (guest)	June 9, 1995	308
Barney, BJ, and the other kids welcome Kenneth to their school. Derek and Tina also pay their old friends a visit to make the day complete. Note: First appearances of Kenneth and Stephen and final appearances of Derek and Tina.
57	9	"A Welcome Home"	Adoption	Carlos; Jason; Julie; Min; Shawn	June 12, 1995	309
Min looks for someone to adopt a lonely puppy her dog gave birth to. Shawn helps show Barney and the others about homes.
58	10	"Classical Cleanup"	Cleaning up Working together	Jason; Kathy; Shawn; Stephen (cameo); Tosha	June 13, 1995	310
Baby Bop accidentally makes a huge mess in the classroom. Barney and his friends all pitch in to help her clean up. Note: First appearance of Mr. Boyd.
59	11	"Our Furry Feathered Fishy Friends"	Types of pets and taking care of them	Carlos; Julie; Kathy; Kenneth	July 24, 1995	311
All the kids bring their pets to school for show-and-tell, showing Barney each of them. The kids reinforce the importance of taking care of pets.
60	12	"Gone Fishing!"	Underwater creatures Sharing	Jason; Juan; Julie; Min	July 25, 1995	312
Barney and his friends learn about the sea and the creatures living there.
61	13	"At Home With Animals"	Animal homes	Kathy; Kenneth; Shawn; Tosha	July 26, 1995	313
During a rainstorm, Barney and his friends go to the treehouse to discover a bird's nest. This leads to a lesson on animals and their different types of homes that they live in.
62	14	"It's Raining, It's Pouring..."	Rainy day activities	Carlos; Jason; Min; Tosha	July 27, 1995	314
While it is raining outside, Tomie dePaola visits and the kids share what they like to do on a rainy day.
63	15	"Camera Safari"	Safari animals	Julie; Kathy; Min; Shawn	July 28, 1995	315
Barney and his friends pretend their playground is a jungle. Baby Bop, however, gets confused between a tiger and a kitty cat, so Barney teaches everyone that there are different species of "cats" living in the world.
64	16	"Who's Who On The Choo Choo?" "Barney's All Aboard For Sharing"	Trains; Sharing	Juan; Julie; Kenneth; Tosha	October 2, 1995	316
Barney and his friends keep hearing trains passing through the playground, but they can't seem to get outside in time to see it. Stella the Storyteller visits to tell "The Little Engine That Could".
65	17	"Are We There Yet?" "Riding In Barney's Car"	Cars; Car safety	Carlos; Kathy; Kenneth (cameo); Min; Shawn; Stephen (cameo)	October 3, 1995 (Note: This episode was first released on the Riding In Barney's Car VHS on September 26, 1995.)	317
The children use their imaginations to make a car for Barney. He goes on some errands and later takes the kids for a car ride.
66	18	"Ship, Ahoy!"	Boats; Imagination	Carlos; Jason; Kathy; Min	October 4, 1995	318
Stella the Storyteller visits to tell them a story about pirates. Barney, Baby Bop, and the kids end up in the story, involving a ship crashing on an island and a search for buried treasure. Note: Final appearances of Kathy and Jason.
67	19	"Hats Off To BJ!"	Hats	Juan; Kenneth; Shawn; Tosha	October 5, 1995	319
BJ announces that he lost his baseball cap, so Barney and his friends help him find a replacement hat. Eventually the group makes him a new baseball cap. Note: Final appearances of Juan and Kenneth.
68	20	"Up We Go!"	Things in the sky	Carlos; Julie; Min; Shawn; Tosha	October 6, 1995	320
Barney and the kids learn about all things that fly in the sky. From airplanes and rockets to kites, the group has a "high-flying" good time. Note: Final appearances of Julie, Carlos, Tosha, Min, and Shawn.

=== Season 4 (1997) ===
No. overall	No. in season	Title	Educational theme	Cast of children	Original release date	Prod. code
69	1	"First Day of School"	What students do for school	Ashley; Kristen; Maria; Stephen	November 3, 1997	401
Barney and the kids visit Stephen's classroom the day before school begins. Baby Bop makes her own school in the treehouse, using Ms. Etta and Scooter's insights of what's going on in the classroom. Note: First appearances of Kristen, Maria, Scooter McNutty, and Miss Etta Kette.
70	2	"Is Everybody Happy?"	Feelings and emotions	Chip; Kim; Kristen; Robert	November 4, 1997	402
Baby Bop accidentally breaks Chip's "twinkle tower", which he made for the school carnival. Barney and the kids talk about feelings. Note: First appearances of Kim, Chip, and Robert.
71	3	"Pennies, Nickels, Dimes"	Money	Hannah; Kim; Robert; Stephen	November 5, 1997	403
The gang works together to earn money to buy Goldie (the school goldfish) a plant, a castle, and another fish. Note: First appearance of Hannah.
72	4	"We've Got Rhythm"	Rhythm; Beat	Ashley; Chip; Hannah; Maria	November 6, 1997	404
Barney and the gang talk about rhythms.
73	5	"Tick Tock Clocks!"	Time; Clocks	Chip; Keesha; Kristen; Stephen	November 7, 1997	405
After Baby Bop is late to meet up with BJ in the treehouse, Barney and the kids help Baby Bop learn to tell time. Dr. TickTock stops by the school to make a special watch for Baby Bop. Note: First appearance of Keesha.
74	6	"Waiting for Mr. MacRooney"	Patience; The postal appearance	Ashley; Chip; Maria; Robert	November 10, 1997	406
Barney and the kids learn about the postal system, and how to be patient while waiting for mail to arrive. Note: Final appearance of Maria.
75	7	"Let's Build Together"	Building stuff Working together	Jeff; Keesha; Kim; Stephen	November 11, 1997	407
Barney and the kids decide to build their own castle. Note: First appearance of Jeff.
76	8	"It's Tradition"	Family traditions	Alissa; Ashley; Kristen; Robert	November 12, 1997	408
The children share each of their family traditions for Barney.
77	9	"A Picture of Health"	Being healthy Doctor check-ups	Curtis; Hannah; Kim; Stephen	November 13, 1997	409
Barney talks about the value of staying healthy and pretends to give the kids a checkup. Note: First appearance of Curtis.
78	10	"Play Ball!"	Balls	Danny; Hannah; Keesha; Robert	November 14, 1997	410
Barney and the kids play different kinds of ball games, using Barney's Vend-O-Ball Machine. Note: First appearance of Danny.
79	11	"A Different Kind of Mystery"	Mysteries; Differences	Ashley; Curtis; Jeff; Kristen	November 17, 1997	411
Barney and the kids investigate a mysterious sound in the classroom.
80	12	"Going on a Bear Hunt"	Bears; Helping others	Danny; Keesha; Kim; Stephen	November 18, 1997	412
Barney and the kids search for Stephen's lost stuffed bear.
81	13	"Let's Eat!"	Nutrition; Manners	Ashley; Chip; Hannah; Robert	November 19, 1997	413
The gang learns about nutrition and different kinds of food, and even learn about good manners when they create their own restaurant.
82	14	"Tree-Mendous Trees"	Trees	Curtis; Kim; Kristen; Stephen	November 20, 1997	414
Curtis is upset about playing a tree in a school play. Barney and the kids learn about trees and how they grow.
83	15	"Good, Clean Fun!"	Cleanliness	Hannah; Jeff; Kristen; Robert	November 21, 1997	415
Barney teaches the kids a lesson on personal cleanliness.
84	16	"Easy, Breezy Day!"	Windy day activities	Ashley; Chip; Curtis; Robert	November 24, 1997	416
Barney and the kids play games that make use of the wind and even take a flight in a hot air balloon.
85	17	"All Mixed Up"	Following directions	Danny; Hannah; Kim; Stephen	November 25, 1997	417
Barney helps out by following directions after the kids' picnic plans are ruined.
86	18	"Oh, Brother...She's My Sister"	Siblings (brothers and sisters)	Alissa; Ashley; Jeff; Robert	November 26, 1997	418
BJ and Baby Bop are fighting with each other. Tomie DePaola shares his book "The Baby Sister" and has his sister Maureen come in and convince Baby Bop and BJ that siblings can be good friends.
87	19	"Once a Pond a Time"	Pond animals	Curtis; Danny; Keesha; Kristen	November 27, 1997	419
Barney and the kids learn about pond life.
88	20	"E-I-E-I-O"	Working on a dairy farm	Hannah; Jeff; Kim; Stephen	November 28, 1997	420
Barney and the kids learn about how a dairy farm works.

=== Season 5 (1998-1999) ===
No. overall	No. in season	Title	Educational theme	Cast of children	Original release date	Prod. code
89	1	"Books Are Fun!"	Fun with books Self-esteem	Curtis; Ashley; Hannah; Robert	November 2, 1998	501
Barney and the kids have fun with books from the school library. Note: First appearance of Booker T. Bookworm.
90	2	"Trading Places"	Separation; Being thankful	Jeff; Keesha; Kristen; Stephen	November 3, 1998	502
Barney teaches the kids that they should be thankful for what they have.
91	3	"Safety First!"	Safety	Danny; Emily; Kim; Robert	November 4, 1998	503
Baby Bop pretends to be a safety officer and instructs everyone on safety rules. Note: First appearance of Emily.
92	4	"Circle of Friends"	Circles	Stephen; Hannah; Keesha; Ashley	November 5, 1998	504
Barney and the kids discusses things that are shaped like circles.
93	5	"The One And Only You"	Being special	Curtis; Danny; Kim; Kristen	November 6, 1998	505
Kristen learns that it's not the size of her family that matters, but how she's loved.
94	6	"Barney's Band"	Musical insrruments	Robert; Jeff; Keesha; Robert	November 9, 1998	506
The gang learns about musical instruments.
95	7	"Try It, You'll Like It!"	Dealing with fears Trying new things	Danny; Emily; Hannah; Stephen	November 10, 1998	507
When Danny does not know how to make a presentation in class, the gang helps him overcome his fear.
96	8	"Colors All Around"	Colors	Chip; Curtis; Kristen; Robert	November 11, 1998	508
Mr. Boyd is unsure what color to paint the hallway. With Barney's color hat, the purple T-Rex and the kids explore different colors.
97	9	"Howdy, Friends!"	Cowboys and cowgirls' life	Chip; Hannah; Jeff; Keesha	November 12, 1998	509
Barney and his friends pretend to be cowboys and cowgirls.
98	10	"Seven Days A Week"	Days of the week	Danny; Emily; Kim; Robert	November 13, 1998	510
BJ is excited for a camping trip, but he cannot stand waiting for it. Barney and the kids help him plan activities for the days following up to the trip.
99	11	"Hidden Treasures"	Ecology	Linda; Keesha; Kristen; Curtis; Stephen	April 5, 1999	511
Barney turns a treehouse cleaning project into a treasure hunt. Note: First appearance of Linda.
100	12	"A Royal Welcome"	Medieval things	Ashley; Chip; Hannah; Robert	April 6, 1999	512
The gang meets Old King Cole.
101	13	"Sweet As Honey"	Bees; Honey	Danny; Emily; Hannah; Stephen	April 7, 1999	513
The gang learns a lesson about bees and the honey-producing process.
102	14	"First Things First!"	Playing with friends Taking turns	Curtis; Keesha; Kim; Robert	April 8, 1999	514
Barney plans a day full of fun activities, with each activity representing a piece of a puzzle.
103	15	"Aunt Rachel Is Here!"	Extended family members	Alissa; Ashley; Jeff; Stephen	April 9, 1999	515
The kids throw a party to celebrate a visit from Ashley and Alissa's aunt, Rachel. Note: Final appearance of Alissa.
104	16	"It's A Rainy Day!"	Rain; Thunderstorms	Linda; Chip; Emily; Hannah; Curtis	April 12, 1999	516
Barney uses a rainy day to teach kids about rainstorms.
105	17	"Easy Does It!"	Wheels; Ramps; Pulleys; Working together	Danny; Jeff; Keesha; Kristen	April 13, 1999	517
Barney demonstrates how to use wheels, ramps and pulleys to move a heavy trunk.
106	18	"What's In A Name?" "A to Z with Barney!"	Alphabet; Letters; Spelling	Chip; Curtis; Hannah; Linda; Stephen	April 14, 1998	518
Chip teaches his sister, Linda, the letters in her name. Note: Final appearance of Curtis.
107	19	"A Very Special Mouse"	Basic computer skills	Danny; Jeff; Keesha; Kristen	April 15, 1999	519
Danny teaches the gang basic computer skills. Note: Final appearances of Kristen and Booker T. Bookworm.
108	20	"A Package Of Friendship"	Friendship	Ashley; Kim; Robert; Stephen	April 16, 1999	520
The gang puts together a special package for a friend who has moved away. Note: Final appearance of Ashley.

=== Season 6 (1999–2000) ===
No. overall	No. in season	Title	Educational theme	Cast of children	Original release date	Prod. code
109	1	"Stick With Imagination!"	Imagination	Hannah; Keesha; Robert; Stephen	November 1, 1999	601
Barney teaches the kids how to use their imaginations to turn ordinary things, such as a stick, into fun playthings.
110	2	"Itty Bitty Bugs"	Bugs and insects	Linda; Hannah; Danny; Robert	November 2, 1999	602
Barney lead the kids on a hiking expedition to discover different kinds of bugs and insects, after some of them (ants) interrupt their picnic.
111	3	"Grandparents Are Grand"	Grandparents	Jeff; Stephen; Kim; Emily	November 3, 1999	603
The children prepare a surprise party for Kim's grandparents, and they each make a special gift for their own grandfathers and grandmothers.
112	4	"Snack Time!"	Trying new foods Nutrition; How foods are produced	Chip; Danny; Jeff; Keesha	November 4, 1999	604
Barney helps the kids learn about healthy snacks and how bread is made as they turn the classroom into a pretend restaurant.
113	5	"A Sunny, Snowy Day"	Summer; Winter	Linda; Jeff; Keesha; Robert	November 5, 1999	605
Robert's pictures from his summer vacation inspire the kids to have some fun in the sun on a cold wintry day, and with a little magic by Barney, they're whisked into a snowy wonderland.
114	6	"You've Got To Have Art" "Ready...Set...Create!"	Arts and crafts	Jeff; Robert; Keesha; Emily	November 8, 1999	606
Barney and the kids learn to appreciate various art forms as they decorate the school for an upcoming Open House.
115	7	"Five Kinds Of Fun!"	The five senses	Danny; Keesha; Linda; Stephen	November 9, 1999	607
After learning about "Explorers" in school, the kids want to explore their own world. Barney shows them how to use their "five senses" to do the job.
116	8	"Count Me In!"	Numbers	Chip; Emily; Hannah; Jill; Stephen	November 10, 1999	608
The kids prepare for their school's Show and Tell presentation, with Stephen bringing in a box of hats for dress-up fun. Note: First appearance of Jill.
117	9	"Who's Who At The Zoo?"	Zoo animals	Danny; Hannah; Kim; Robert	November 11, 1999	609
Barney and the kids learn about various animals at the zoo, and Stella gives the children a mysterious present for a special zoo animal.
118	10	"Birthday Olé"	Birthdays	Robert; Stephen; Kim; Emily	November 12, 1999	610
Barney's treehouse is the site for Robert's Mexican-themed birthday party. The piñata proves to be the highlight of the kids' fiesta. Note: Final appearance of the Barney Bag.
119	11	"Excellent Exercise!"	Exercise	Danny; Jeff; Jill; Stephen	April 3, 2000	611
Barney and his friends learn how to exercise well.
120	12	"Brushing Up On Teeth"	Dental hygiene	Danny; Keesha; Linda; Robert	April 4, 2000	612
Barney teaches the kids about their teeth. Note: Final appearance of Linda.
121	13	"A "Little" Mother Goose"	Mother Goose rhymes	Jeff; Robert; Keesha; Jill; Emily	April 5, 2000	613
Mother Goose teaches Barney and the kids to rhyme. Note: This episode is a shortened version of the "Barney's Rhyme Time Rhythm" video.
122	14	"Good Job!"	Jobs	Danny; Emily; Hannah; Jeff	April 6, 2000	614
The kids think about growing up for jobs in their futures. They even pretend to be dancers, chefs, bus drivers and sailors.
123	15	"It's Home To Me"	Different kinds of homes Rooms in a house	Danny; Emily; Hannah; Stephen	April 7, 2000	615
Barney and the kids learn how different families have different homes and that home is where family and friends are.
124	16	"How Does Your Garden Grow?"	Gardening	Danny; Jill; Kim; Stephen	April 10, 2000	616
Barney shows off his green thumb in a show about gardening, in which the kids harvest their crop from the garden in their playground. Note: Final appearance of Jill.
125	17	"You Can Do It!"	Trying new things	Jeff; Keesha; Stephen	April 11, 2000	617
The kids find out that learning something new takes practice. Keesha, Stephen, and Jeff help Barney teach Baby Bop to jump rope. Note: Final appearance of Stephen.
126	18	"Here Comes The Firetruck!"	Fire safety	Hannah; Jeff; Kim; Robert	April 12, 2000	618
The kids learn about the rules of fire safety and also get to see how the controls work in the cab of a fire truck. Note: Final appearance of Kim.
127	19	"Ready, Set, Go!"	Transportation	Chip; Danny; Emily; Keesha	April 13, 2000	619
Barney and the kids pretend to travel, and imagine what it's like to be a bus driver, ocean-liner captain, airplane copilot and railroad engineer. They also come to realize there's no place like home. Note: Final appearances of Chip, Danny, Keesha, Scooter McNutty, Miss Etta Kette, and the Adventure Screen.
128	20	"You Are Special"	Being special	Robert; Hannah; Emily; Jeff	April 14, 2000	620
The kids look at things that make each one special and write them into a blank book that Barney has given them. Note: Final appearances of Jeff, Robert, Emily, Hannah and Stella the Storyteller.

=== Season 7 (2002) ===
No. overall	No. in season	Title	Educational theme	Cast of children	Original release date	Prod. code
129	1	"All Aboard!"	Trains; Teamwork	Angela; Kami; Mario; Scott	September 2, 2002	701
When Barney and the rest of the gang decide to help clean up the park, Kami feels upset because she can't work as fast as the others. Feeling like the caboose on a train, she's dejected, until Scott reminds her that the caboose is where the train conductor rides. All of the children learn more about trains and finish up the day by cleaning up an old caboose in the park and learn how train signal flags work. Note: First appearances of Angela, Kami, Mario and Scott. Dean Wendt replaces Bob West as the voice of Barney.
130	2	"Up, Down and Around!"	Ups and downs	Mario; Sarah; Tony; Whitney	September 3, 2002	702
When Tony's kite gets stuck in a tree while he's trying to show it to Barney and the rest of his friends, everyone learns about the ups and downs of life, and how to overcome them. Learning what else can go up and down helps them figure out a way to rescue Tony's kite. Note: First appearances of Sarah, Tony and Whitney.
131	3	"Tea-riffic Manners"	Practicing good manners	Beth; Gianna; Scott	September 4, 2002	703
Gianna, Barney, and BJ teach Baby Bop the proper manners for a tea party. From sneezing politely, to learning the magic words, to understanding the importance of cleaning up their own messes, everyone receives a vital lesson on etiquette. Note: First appearances of Beth and Gianna.
132	4	"Puppy Love"	Dogs	Beth; Kami; Tony	September 5, 2002	704
It's time for Bingo's visit to the vet, but he's nowhere to be found. Everyone searches for him and learns about all the different kinds of dogs they can own.
133	5	"Bunches of Boxes"	Imagination; Creativity	Kami; Mario; Scott; Whitney	September 6, 2002	705
Barney helps the kids turn the disappointment of finding just empty boxes into a spectacular display of imagination as they learn just what an empty cardboard box can become.
134	6	"Stop! Go!"	Stop and go	Angela; Gianna; Jamal; Mario	September 9, 2002	706
Baby Bop plays with "Stop" and "Go" signs and then directs traffic.
135	7	"Red, Yellow, and Blue!"	Primary colors	Mario; Sarah; Tony	September 10, 2002	707
The gang spends the day celebrating primary colors.
136	8	"Play for Exercise!"	Exercise	Beth; Scott; Whitney	September 11, 2002	708
The gang learns that while they are playing all their games outside, they are actually exercising.
137	9	"Come Blow Your Horn!"	Horn instruments	Angela; Gianna; Nick	September 12, 2002	709
It's time for the evening concert with Mr. Boyd and his brass band. Everyone hopes to be able to play an instrument in the band, but only two people shine. Barney gets to play the tuba and BJ plays his drum. Note: First appearance of Nick.
138	10	"A New Friend!" "It's Nice to Meet You!"	Making new friends	Colleen; Kami; Mario; Scott	September 13, 2002	710
A new friend has joined the gang and Barney makes sure that Colleen fits in and doesn't feel awkward.
139	11	"Numbers! Numbers!"	Numbers	Beth; Mario; Tony; Whitney	September 20, 2002	711
Barney and the kids go on a number hunt after a gust of wind accidentally blows away Tony's box filled with numbers. Their hunt takes them all over the park and inside the caboose, and they find numbers everywhere.
140	12	"This Way In! This Way Out!"	Ins and outs	Angela; Nick; Sarah	September 27, 2002	712
Barney teaches his friends about the "ins" and "outs" as Angela sets her box turtle Terry free.
141	13	"Spring Into Fun!"	Spring	Beth; Gianna; Mario; Scott	October 4, 2002	713
Barney is determined not to let a few spring showers ruin the day. He teaches the kids all about the changes in seasons and that rainy days can be fun.
142	14	"Play It Safe!"	Safety	Sarah; Tony; Whitney	October 11, 2002	714
Barney teaches Baby Bop and friends about safety and that bandages are meant for real injuries, not make believe.
143	15	"Three Lines, Three Corners"	Triangles	Angela; Kami; Mario; Whitney	October 18, 2002	715
From a chalk hopscotch board made of triangles, the kids explore the shapes around them. The triangle gets the most exposure, from rooftops to paper hats.
144	16	"A Parade of Bikes"	Bicycles	Kami; Nick; Sarah	October 25, 2002	716
It is time for the bicycle parade. All is going well, until Nick shows up and lets them know he had an accident on his bike. The gang quickly works to cheer Nick up and fix his bike. He also gets a little lesson on bicycle safety from Mr. Boyd. Once the bike is all fixed up, it's on with the parade.
145	17	"It's a Happy Day!"	The feeling of happiness	Beth; Mario; Whitney	November 1, 2002	717
With Beth's invention of "Happy Day", all the children learn that true happiness comes from doing nice things for others.
146	18	"My Family and Me"	Families	Gianna; Mario; Nick; Whitney	November 8, 2002	718
When Nick, Mario, Whitney, and Gianna receive mysterious invitations to a picnic, along with instructions to bring a family treasure, they are all very confused. After arriving, they share their treasures and discuss the differences between their families. Barney surprises them by bringing all of their families to enjoy the picnic with them. Everyone learns that it doesn't matter what kind of family someone has—it only matters that someone's loved.
147	19	"Splish! Splash!"	Importance of water	Angela; Gianna; Nick; Scott	November 15, 2002	719
Barney and the kids learn about water and the important place it holds in people's lives. They learn that water is everywhere, and end up in the swimming pool making a big splash.
148	20	"BJ's Really Cool House"	Rooms in a house	Beth; Kami; Sarah; Tony	November 22, 2002	720
BJ builds his own house in the park. While waiting to see the house, Barney and his friends discuss different rooms in a house. When BJ forgets to include space for Baby Bop in his house, Barney reminds him that family makes a house a home.

=== Season 8 (2003–2004) ===
No. overall	No. in season	Title	Educational theme	Cast of children	Original release date	Prod. code
149	1	"A Fountain of Fun"	Park activities	Jackson; Mario; Nick; Whitney	September 15, 2003	801
Barney and the kids explore and enjoy the park while waiting for Mr. Boyd's park fountain to be delivered. Note: First appearance of Jackson.
150	2	"On Again, Off Again"	Ons and offs	Beth; Mario; Nick; Sarah	September 16, 2003	802
From silly hats, shoes, tap dancing, and many other wearable things, Barney and the kids have fun dressing up Baby Bop's teddy bear.
151	3	"Sharing Is Caring!"	Sharing	Beth; Gianna; Scott	September 17, 2003	803
The children donate toys to Mr. Boyd's toy drive and Baby Bop learns about sharing.
152	4	"Here Kitty, Kitty"	Cats	Angela; Mario; Tony; Whitney	September 18, 2003	804
Barney and the kids help Miss Jo find her lost cat, and they learn a lot about cats along the way.
153	5	"Once Upon A Fairy Tale"	Fairy tales	Gianna; Jackson; Kami; Mario	September 19, 2003	805
Mario tries to write a fairy tale and the kids try to help by acting out their favorite stories.
154	6	"It's Hot! It's Cold!"	Temperatures	Beth; Scott; Whitney	September 26, 2003	806
Barney and the kids learn about hot and cold, then Barney turns the playground into a winter and a summer wonderland.
155	7	"A Perfectly Purple Day"	The color purple	Colleen; Gianna; Nick; Sarah; Tony	October 3, 2003	807
Barney and the kids plan a party for Colleen, using her favorite color, purple.
156	8	"Day and Night"	The difference between day and night	Beth; Nick; Whitney	October 10, 2003	808
Barney helps the kids experience the differences between day and night.
157	9	"Play Piano With Me!"	Pianos	Beth; Kami; Mario	October 17, 2003	809
Barney and the kids learn about pianos after finding Mr. Boyd and Bingo working on a player piano.
158	10	"A Picture of Friendship"	Friendship	Gianna; Jackson; Mario; Sarah	October 24, 2003	810
Barney and the children learn what it takes to be a good friend after accidentally hurting BJ's feelings.
159	11	"A-Counting We Will Go!"	Numbers	Beth; Nick; Whitney	May 3, 2004	811
When Baby Bop becomes upset when she finds out that she is not able to count to ten, Barney and the kids help her by playing number games, visit a make believe store, and put on a number parade in the park.
160	12	"A Little Big Day"	The difference between big things and little things	Angela; Kami; Nick; Scott	May 4, 2004	812
Barney tells Baby Bop and the children that things, both big and little, matter.
161	13	"A World of Friends"	Countries; Music around the world	Jackson; Kami; Mario; Scott; Whitney	May 5, 2004	813
The park has an international festival, which enables Barney and the kids to learn about Kenya, Brazil, Germany, Italy and South Korea.
162	14	"Who's Your Neighbor?"	Neighborhoods	Gianna; Jackson; Sarah; Tony	May 6, 2004	814
This episode focuses on community helpers and how they help Barney and the kids to live safely and happily.
163	15	"Squares, Squares Everywhere"	Squares	Angela; Beth; Nick	May 7, 2004	815
Nick has to find squares for his homework, and he finds it more fun finding them when Barney and the kids help.
164	16	"Let's Go For A Ride!"	Cars; Car safety	Gianna; Jackson (cameo); Kami; Mario	May 10, 2004	816
Cars and buses are discussed on a day of pretend-play that starts with Mario's toy car and BJ's remote-controlled car.
165	17	"That Makes Me Mad!"	The feeling of anger	Jacklyn (cameo); Matthew (cameo); Nick; Sarah; Whitney	May 11, 2004	817
Barney asks his friends for some good ways to express anger and how to deal with it.
166	18	"It's Your Birthday, Barney!"	Birthdays	Angela (cameo); Beth; Gianna; Jackson; Kami (cameo); Mario; Nick (cameo); Sarah (cameo); Scott (cameo); Tony; Whitney (cameo)	May 12, 2004	818
It's Barney's birthday and the kids, Baby Bop and BJ plan a party to celebrate.
167	19	"It's Showtime!"	Putting on a talent show	Mario; Nick; Sarah; Whitney	May 13, 2004	819
A performance is planned by Barney, BJ, and the kids, who intend to entertain their friends in the park.
168	20	"At Home In The Park"	Homes for animals in the park	Kami; Nick; Sarah; Tony	May 14, 2004	820
Barney helps the kids to learn about how animals make their homes in the park.

=== Season 9 (2004–2005) ===
No. overall	No. in season	Title	Educational theme	Cast of children	Original release date	Prod. code
169	1	"Everybody's Got Feelings"	Feelings and emotions	David; Nick; Whitney	September 6, 2004	901
Barney relates that little people have big feelings. He gets his friends to make masks of faces. Barney helps BJ and Baby Bop deal with their anger.
170	2	"Caring Hearts"	Hearts	David; Nick; Whitney	September 7, 2004	902
In their school project, the kids attach hearts with names of people they care about, on a bare tree. Barney helps the kids get a wide view of all the people who care about them. Their friends and family tree "blooms" considerably.
171	3	"Let's Make Music!"	Music; Musical instruments	David; Kami; Stacy	September 8, 2004	903
Barney tells the kids how rhythm is instrumental to music. It inspires the kids to start a marching band.
172	4	"Movin' Along"	Exercise	David; Kami; Stacy	September 9, 2004	904
Barney steps in as the Simon of a Simon Says game. It starts everyone dancing and moving about. Midway through the game, Barney narrates a dramatization of The Tortoise and the Hare.
173	5	"Let Your Creativity Fly!"	Airplanes	David; Laura; Miguel	September 10, 2004	905
Laura, David, and Miguel find Barney's paper airplane—and set their imaginations on one goal: building a pretend airplane.
174	6	"Imagine That!"	Imagination	David; Laura; Whitney	September 13, 2004	906
The children use their imaginations to pretend they're in Laura's picture enjoying an island adventure.
175	7	"All About Me"	Traits that make people special	Jackson (cameo); Laura; Whitney	September 14, 2004	907
Positive self-esteem is the goal as Barney teaches the kids that they're all special.
176	8	"My Baby Brother"	Adjusting to a newborn in the family	David; Laura; Whitney	September 15, 2004	908
Barney teaches the kids about adjusting to new babies in a family.
177	9	"Keep On Truckin'"	Trucks; Truck safety	Jackson; Nick; Rachel	September 16, 2004	909
The children spend the day learning about trucks. They also learn the value of sharing and how to play safely.
178	10	"I'm a Builder"	Construction; Imagination	David; Nick; Rachel	September 17, 2004	910
Barney builds a castle with the children after they watch construction vehicles.
179	11	"Coming On Strong"	Good health habits	Jackson; Miguel; Rachel; Whitney	May 2, 2005	911
Jackson, Miguel, Rachel, and "Dr. Whitney" play check-up to see how they have grown. Barney shares with them ways to help their bodies grow stronger and healthier.
180	12	"Let's Play Games!"	Playing sports and games for exercise	Jackson; Miguel; Rachel; Whitney	May 3, 2005	912
BJ pulls out a huge pile of balls and other things for playing games, but he needs friends to help him decide what game to play.
181	13	"You Can Count On Me!"	Numbers	Kami; Nick; Rachel	May 4, 2005	913
Kami, Rachel, and Nick go on Barney's number hunt. As Barney shows different number cards, the kids use their senses to find the real objects.
182	14	"A Wonderful World of Colors and Shapes"	Shapes; Colors	Jackson; Stacy; Whitney	May 5, 2005	914
Barney shows off a painting, which inspires the children to create an art show. Barney also shows Baby Bop how to paint shapes.
183	15	"Easy as ABC"	Alphabet; Letters	Jackson; Stacy; Whitney	May 6, 2005	915
Baby Bop learns about letters and how to spell her name and has fun with the alphabet.
184	16	"Look What I Can Do!"	Trying new things	Jackson; Kami; Rachel	May 9, 2005	916
The children play "I Can Do", in which each one shares something he or she can do; Baby Bop worries about trying something new, however. Note: Final appearance of Kami.
185	17	"Making a Move!"	Understanding transition to a new neighborhood	Anna; Miguel; Nick; Stacy; Whitney	May 10, 2005	917
Anna misses her friends from her old neighborhood, so Barney and the kids make her feel welcome. Anna also shares her memory book.
186	18	"Home, Safe Home"	Firefighters	David; Nick; Stacy; Whitney	May 11, 2005	918
Fire safety is the subject as a firefighter inspects the caboose. Baby Bop also learns about safety when she bathes her teddy bear.
187	19	"On the Road Again!"	Cars; Car safety	David; Jackson; Laura	May 12, 2005	919
Barney creates a kid-size car to teach the children about automobiles. He, Baby Bop and BJ teach a lesson about seat-belt safety.
188	20	"My Friends, The Doctor and the Dentist"	Dental hygiene Good healthy habits	David; Jackson; Laura	May 13, 2005	920
Barney and his friends learn about healthy habits such as brushing teeth, getting checkups, eating healthy food, and exercising.

=== Season 10 (2006) ===
No. overall	No. in season	Title	Educational theme	Cast of children	No. in Season 14	Original release date	Alternate air date
189a 257b	1a	"Welcome, Cousin Riff"	Making new friends	-	9b	September 18, 2006	October 14, 2010
Barney springs a new welcome surprise on BJ and Baby Bop; their cousin, Riff, is moving to town.
189b	1b	"Special Skills"	Special skills	Abigail; Jackson; Rachel	-	September 18, 2006	-
Barney encourages the shy Riff to join BJ and Baby Bop in a special show.
190a 267b	2a	"Airplanes"	Airplanes	Danny; David; Madison; Riley	19b	September 19, 2006	November 1, 2010
Riff takes apart BJ's new toy airplane to see how it works.
190b 250b	2b	"Boats"	Boats	Allison; Scott	2b	September 19, 2006	October 5, 2010
Baby Bop shows an interest in boats, so Barney shows her some vessels on a computer.
191a 256a	3a	"Butterflies"	Butterflies	Claire; Emma; Josh; Samantha	8a	September 20, 2006	October 13, 2010
Barney, BJ, Riff, and the kids help Baby Bop search for her pet caterpillar, Monty, who has disappeared.
191b	3b	"Bugs"	Bugs and insects	Ethan; Melissa; Olivia; Patty	-	September 20, 2006	-
Riff, who does not want to be around bugs, is less than thrilled when BJ turns the caboose into a bug zoo.
192a	4a	"Shapes"	Shapes	Jackson; Lindsey; Sadie	-	September 21, 2006	-
The gang goes to a carnival filled with shapes, but Riff thinks he won't be able to play any games after he loses his lucky medal.
192b	4b	"Colors"	Colors	David; Haley; Rachel; Tracy	-	September 21, 2006	-
Baby Bop sees a rainbow, but it disappears before she can show her friends, so Barney and the others paint a new rainbow.
193a 263a	5a	"Seeing"	The sense of sight	Lucas; Sophie	15a	September 22, 2006	October 22, 2010
When the gang plays hide-and-seek, Baby Bop says that an elephant is hiding in the park.
193b	5b	"Hearing"	The sense of hearing	Haley; Jason; Josh; Tracy	-	September 22, 2006	-
BJ and Riff try to see who can make the louder sound.
194a	6a	"Glad to Be Me"	Self-esteem; Social skills	David; Melissa; Olivia	-	September 25, 2006	-
Barney teaches his friends that being themselves is important.
194b 251b	6b	"Arts"	Arts and crafts	Jessica	3b	September 25, 2006	October 6, 2010
Baby Bop feels left out when Barney's friends pay close attention to Riff while they are at an art festival.
195a 252a	7a	"Movement"	Different ways of exercise	Amy; Carmen; Matthew	4a	September 26, 2006	October 7, 2010
BJ and Baby Bop help Barney prepare for a footrace by showing him how to stretch his muscles.
195b 253b	7b	"BJ's Snack Attack"	Healthy snacks	Hope; Lindsey; Lucas; Olivia	5b	September 26, 2006	October 8, 2010
BJ feels sick after eating too many sweets, so he takes a nap, only to dream of eating more sweets.
196a	8a	"Counting"	Counting; Numbers	Bethany; Morgan; Peter; Ryan; Sadie; Sophie	-	September 27, 2006	-
Barney teaches Baby Bop to count after BJ and Riff find a treasure map that requires math skills to find the prize.
196b	8b	"Letters"	Alphabet; Letters	Emma; Lucas; Scott; Tracy	-	September 27, 2006	-
The gang makes posters to advertise a music concert at a park.
197a	9a	"Pets"	Types of pets and taking care of them	Adam; Brian	-	September 28, 2006	-
BJ offers to take care of a pal's dog, but he needs help from his friends when the dog disappears.
197b	9b	"Vets"	Veterinarians	Bridget; Claire; Emma	-	September 28, 2006	-
Barney and Riff pretend to be veterinarians to help Baby Bop when her teddy bear is damaged.
198a 249b	10a	"Winter"	Winter	David; Jackson; Kathy; Laura; Olivia; Ryan; Sadie; Sophie	1b	September 29, 2006	October 4, 2010
Baby Bop learns about fun things to do in winter, and she expectantly waits for the first snowfall.
198b	10b	"Summer"	Summer	Amy; Ethan; Jackson; Lacey	-	September 29, 2006	-
BJ discovers fun things to do in the summertime, including relaxing activities.
199a	11a	"Caring"	Caring	Bethany; David; Lindsey; Melanie; Peter; Scott	-	October 2, 2006	-
The gang celebrates Barney's birthday, but Riff worries that his friend will not like the handmade gift that he gave to him.
199b	11b	"Rhythm"	Rhythm; Beat	Olivia; Rachel	-	October 2, 2006	-
Baby Bop's friends teach her about rhythm after she joins a marching band.
200a 261a	12a	"Playing Games"	Following the rules	Allison; Claire; Josh; Melissa; Ryan; Tracy	13a	October 3, 2006	October 20, 2010
Barney and Riff help Baby Bop understand the importance of following rules when playing games.
200b 266b	12b	"Fun with Reading"	The benefits of reading and writing	Audrey; Bridget; Emma	18b	October 3, 2006	October 28, 2010
BJ injures his foot and cannot play outside, so Barney suggests that he reads to help pass the time.
201a	13a	"Making Mistakes"	Discovering that everyone makes mistakes	Olivia; Ryan; Rachel	-	October 4, 2006	-
BJ flubs a paint job on the caboose, so Barney shows him that everyone makes mistakes from time to time.
201b 252b	13b	"Separation"	Separation	Allison; Amy; Bethany; David; Ethan; Jackson	4b	October 4, 2006	October 7, 2010
Barney teaches Baby Bop how to deal with separation anxiety when she misses BJ and Riff, who are on a camping trip.
202a	14a	"Days of the Week"	Days of the week	Anna; Brianna; Carmen	-	October 5, 2006	-
Barney teaches his friends about the days of the week to help pass the time as they wait for a petting zoo to arrive in town.
202b 253b	14b	"Sharing"	Sharing	Amy; Kelly; Mario; Matt; Ryan	6b	October 5, 2006	October 11, 2010
Riff and Baby Bop hold a sale in the park to raise money for a new scooter for BJ after Riff wrecks his pal's old one.
203a 258a	15a	"Rabbits"	Rabbits; Problem solving	Amy; Jackson; Sophie	10a	October 6, 2006	October 15, 2010
BJ plays detective to find who or what has been nibbling on Baby Bop's snacks.
203b 264b	15b	"Ducks and Fish"	Ducks; Fish	Ryan; Tracy	16b	October 6, 2006	October 26, 2010
Barney and Riff take care of a nest of duck eggs.
204a 266a	16a	"Mother Goose"	Mother Goose rhymes	Adam; Danny; Kaitlyn; Riley	18a	October 9, 2006	October 28, 2010
Mother Goose characters ask BJ for help in finding parts of their rhymes, and Mother Goose arrives to lend a hand.
204b	16b	"Fairy Tales"	Fairy tales Patience	Ethan; Lacey	-	October 9, 2006	-
Baby Bop listens to a fairy tale while she waits to get a present.
205a 265b	17a	"Things I Can Do"	Identifying personal accomplishments and skills	Becky; Lindsey	17b	October 10, 2006	October 27, 2010
Baby Bop, unhappy with her own talents, wants to play the keyboard like Riff and be able to skate like Barney. Barney shows her that she should be proud of what she can do now.
205b 255b	17b	"Differences"	Appreciating differences	Jackson; Jake; Lacey; Michael; Rachel	7b	October 10, 2006	October 12, 2010
Barney steps in when a wheelchair-using child is ignored by his friends, as they suggest games he can't participate in. Barney shows the others that not even he can do everything the kids can.
206a	18a	"Dancing"	Dancing	Allison; David; Jamal; Olivia; Ryan	-	October 11, 2006	-
Barney helps a boy learn to dance.
206b	18b	"Singing"	Singing	Amy; Ethan; Laura; Tracy	-	October 11, 2006	-
Barney tells Baby Bop a fairy tale about a princess who cannot find a song to sing, and Baby Bop imagines herself as the princess.
207a	19a	"Neighborhood"	Neighborhoods	-	-	October 12, 2006	-
Riff loses his drumsticks, but he's sure he left them in one of the neighborhoods he visited, so Barney helps him remember those places.
207b	19b	"Careers"	Jobs	Claire; Joey; Samantha	-	October 12, 2006	-
Baby Bop tries to decide what profession she will have as an adult.
208a 257a	20a	"China"	China	Jackson; Peter; Ryan (cameo); Sadie; Tracy	9a	October 13, 2006	October 14, 2010
BJ awaits a visit from a pen pal in China, so his friends help him prepare for the guest.
208b	20b	"Kenya"	Kenya	Jackson; Sophie	-	October 13, 2006	-
A dance troupe performs a show featuring African music and dance routines. Note: Final appearances of Jackson and Sophie.

=== Season 11 (2007) ===
No. overall	No. in season	Title	Educational theme	Cast of children	No. in Season 14	Original release date	Alternate air date
209a 253a	1a	"Pistachio"	Self-discipline	Olivia; Rachel; Ryan	5a	September 17, 2007	October 8, 2010
Barney runs into trouble when he cannot stop eating pistachios.
209b	1b	"Full Team Ahead"	Teamwork	David; Laura; Tracy	-	September 17, 2007	-
BJ needs to decide if he wants Riff, who isn't good at sports, on his baseball team.
210a	2a	"The Magic Words"	Practicing good manners	Sofia; Tracy; Victor	-	September 18, 2007	-
Baby Bop finds out that the magic words to being polite are please and thank you.
210b	2b	"Litterbot"	Environmental awareness Picking up after oneself	Ryan & Tori	-	September 18, 2007	-
Riff tries to find an easy way to pick up the litter, but the robot that he builds doesn't work as planned.
211a 254a	3a	"Bop 'til You Drop"	Respect; Patience; Friendship	David; Lily; Nathan; Olivia	6a	September 19, 2007	October 11, 2010
Barney steps in when Baby Bop gets a little too pushy and bossy with her friends.
211b	3b	"The Sleepless Sleepover"	Friendship; Dealing with fears Trying new things	Dylan; Mei; Melanie	-	September 19, 2007	-
Barney helps Melanie get over her fear of sleeping outside tonight at a sleepover campout in the park.
212a 255a	4a	"Little Red Rockin' Hood"	Accepting others Individual differences	Amy; Megan; Rachel; Tracy	7a	September 20, 2007	October 12, 2010
Barney, Baby Bop, BJ, Riff and the kids put on a twist on the classic fairy tale story of "Little Red Riding Hood" where a wolf and a young girl combined their music together to form "country rock". Note: First appearance of Megan.
212b 262b	4b	"The Whole Truth"	Honesty	David; Rachel (cameo); Sarah; Tori	14b	September 20, 2007	October 21, 2010
After BJ takes credit for Sarah's picture of Barney that she has painted, Barney teaches him to always be honest with his friends.
213a	5a	"The Wind and the Sun"	Problem solving Sharing	Amy; Tori; Tyler	-	September 21, 2007	-
After Baby Bop has set up her lemonade stand, BJ decides he wants to fly his kite right there. When Baby Bop and BJ fight to use the same place in the park, Barney tells them the story called "The Wind and the Sun".
213b 256b	5b	"The Nature of Things"	Appreciating nature	Mei; Rachel; Victor	8b	September 21, 2007	October 13, 2010
After Rachel makes a mess in the park, she dreams about how littering affects many animal homes, only to find out why it's important not to litter.
214a 268a	6a	"The New Kid"	Friendship	Eva; Laura; Noah; Sofia (cameo); Victor (cameo)	20a	September 24, 2007	November 2, 2010
Riff makes a new friend and BJ gets jealous.
214b	6b	"Grandpa's Visit"	Appreciating grandparents	Eva; Ryan; Tracy; Tyler	-	September 24, 2007	-
Ryan's grandfather is coming to visit him, so he cannot go to the movie theater with Barney and the others. He later learns his grandpa is more fun than he thought, and in return, the two of them decide to go to the movies after all.
215a 259a	7a	"The Big Garden"	Working in a garden	David; Laura; Melanie	11a	September 25, 2007	October 18, 2010
Everyone is busy working in the garden when Baby Bop decides she wants them to play.
215b 258b	7b	"Listen!"	The sense of hearing	Amy; Claire; Noah (cameo); Ryan	10b	September 25, 2007	October 15, 2010
Riff hears something in the park and tries to figure out what it is.
216a	8a	"Lost and Found"	Responsibility	Dylan; Laura	-	September 26, 2007	-
The gang helps BJ find the circus tickets that he lost.
216b	8b	"Pot Full of Sunshine"	Coping with death	Eva; Ryan; Tracy	-	September 26, 2007	-
A flower that Baby Bop has been trying to get to grow dies when it gets too cold out one morning.
217a	9a	"Trail Boss Barney"	Teamwork	David; Eva; Laura	-	September 27, 2007	-
Barney teaches everyone about teamwork as they visit a ranch.
217b 259b	9b	"Get Happy!"	The feeling of happiness	Mime; Olivia	11b	September 27, 2007	October 18, 2010
The kids try to cheer up a girl they meet in the park.
218a	10a	"For the Fun of It"	Practice; Perseverance	Eva (cameo); Laura (cameo); Terry	-	September 28, 2007	-
BJ tries to keep up with Terry on the basketball court, but the former can't keep up.
218b	10b	"Starlight, Star Bright"	Imagination	Lily; Tyler	-	September 28, 2007	-
Baby Bop sees a falling star while camping with Barney and the gang in the park and sets off to put it back in the sky.
219a 260a	11a	"Big As Barney"	Being special	David (cameo); Laura; Ryan; Tracy	12a	October 1, 2007	October 19, 2010
Ryan finds out what is special about himself, after he tries to be like Barney.
219b 261b	11b	"No, No, No!"	Following directions Being polite	Melanie; Ryan	13b	October 1, 2007	October 20, 2010
Everyone keeps telling Baby Bop no, and yet, she gets mad.
220a 262a	12a	"The Emperor's Contest"	Contests	Claire; Kelly; Lucas; Ryan; Victor	14a	October 2, 2007	October 21, 2010
When Ryan thinks about cheating during a fishing contest, he finds out why it is important not to cheat.
220b 263b	12b	"Beethoven's Hear!"	Being deaf	Dana; Tracy; Tyler	15b	October 2, 2007	October 22, 2010
Barney invites Beethoven to explain how being deaf doesn't have to change his life completely.
221a	13a	"Guess Who?"	Choices	David; Heidi; Melanie; Nathan; Sofia; Tori	-	October 3, 2007	-
The kids have chosen on their Halloween costumes, which leads to Barney telling them what choices really mean. Riff forgets what to be for Halloween, but with help from Barney and his friends, everyone comes to realize how important choices are.
221b	13b	"Sweet Treats"	Halloween	Amy; Heidi; Nathan; Ramon; Tori; Tyler	-	October 3, 2007	-
Barney and his friends go trick-or-treating in the park.
222a 264a	14a	"Best In Show"	Sharing	Eva; Olivia; Rachel; Ryan; Susan	16a	October 4, 2007	October 26, 2010
When the kids decide to have a Dog Show in the park, BJ feels a little left out because he doesn't have a dog.
222b 260b	14b	"The Chase"	Independent thinking	Megan; Nathan; Tracy; Victor	12b	October 4, 2007	October 19, 2010
Barney tells the kids a Native American tale called "the Chase", showing them that working as a team is important.
223a	15a	"Dream Big"	Determination	David; Megan	-	October 5, 2007	-
Riff dreams of traveling to Mars, so he builds a rocket. The trip does not turn out so well, but Barney explains that Riff shouldn't give up dreaming.
223b	15b	"That's What A Mommy Is"	Appreciating caregivers	Heidi; Tracy	-	October 5, 2007	-
Baby Bop learns what makes moms special.
224a 265a	16a	"The Shrinking Blankey"	Growing	David; Laura	17a	October 8, 2007	October 27, 2010
Baby Bop learns that growing is a good thing.
224b	16b	"The Awful Tooth"	Dental hygiene	Melanie; Rachel	-	October 8, 2007	-
Riff has a sore tooth, but he is afraid of the dentist.
225a 267a	17a	"The Blame Game"	Taking responsibility for one's action	Marcos; Melanie; Olivia	19a	October 9, 2007	November 1, 2010
After Marcos is scared to tell Melanie about her art show project that he has broken, Barney teaches him to always take responsibility for his friends' action.
225b	17b	"What's Your Name?"	The meanings of names and their origins	Amy; Mei; Myra; Ryan	-	October 9, 2007	-
The kids are painting pictures in the caboose and have signed their names, which leads to Barney telling them what names really mean. A new kid, Myra, is afraid that her name is too ordinary, but with help from Barney and her friends, everyone comes to realize how important names are and where they come from.
226a 251a	18a	"The Magic Caboose"	Imagination	David; Melanie; Rachel; Sofia; Victor	3a	October 10, 2007	October 6, 2010
Barney and the kids board the "Magic Caboose" to take pretend trips to different countries.
226b	18b	"BJ the Great"	Practice; Perseverance; Problem solving	Eva; Megan; Tracy	-	October 10, 2007	-
BJ wants to become a great magician, but he does not want to practice. When he thinks he has turned his sister into a turtle, he learns that practice makes perfect.
227a 249a	19a	"Gift of the Dinos"	The true meaning of Christmas	Marcos; Rachel	1a	October 11, 2007	October 4, 2010
Barney reminds BJ and Riff that Christmas is more than just getting presents.
227b	19b	"A Visit to Santa"	Christmas; Giving	Megan; Melanie; Nathan; Ryan	-	October 11, 2007	-
Melanie misses the mailman when she wasn't getting her Christmas letter to him on time, so Barney takes her on a trip to Santa's workshop at the North Pole to deliver her Christmas wish list to Santa.
228a 250a	20a	"Riff's Musical Zoo"	Zoo animals	David; Marcos; Rachel; Tracy	2a	October 12, 2007	October 5, 2010
After Tracy's mother can't take the kids to the zoo, Riff uses stuffed animals and musical instruments to mimic animals sounds to create a "Musical Zoo".
228b 268b	20b	"The Princess and the Frog"	Kindness	Myra; Ryan; Victor	20b	October 12, 2007	November 2, 2010
After Baby Bop promises Ryan to watch his pet frog, Barney tells her the story of "The Princess and the Frog" to remind her to always keep her promises.

=== Season 12 (2008) ===
This is the first season since season 9 to have the full 30-minute runtime.

No. overall	No. in season	Title	Educational theme	Cast of children	Original release date
229	1	"Way to Go!: A Travel Adventure"	Traveling; Creativity	Daniel; Destiny; Holly	September 15, 2008
With the help of their imaginations, the kids explore all types of travel using cardboard boxes. Note: First episode since "My Friends, The Doctor and the Dentist" to have the full 30-minute runtime.
230	2	"The Misbegotten Moon: A Space Adventure"	Outer space	Marcos; Jackie	September 16, 2008
Baby Bop sees a half-moon and thinks the moon is broken. Barney takes her to see the Man in the Moon.
231	3	"The Sword in the Sandbox: A Storybook Adventure"	Perseverance	Daniel; David; Emma; Holly; Jackie	September 17, 2008
When Daniel thinks that he is too little to do anything right, Barney tells him a version of the King Arthur legends, where Arthur pulls the sword out of a sandbox.
232	4	"Riff to the Rescue!: A Wild West Adventure"	The Wild West; Trying new things	David; Taylor; Tracy	September 18, 2008
Barney tells Riff the story of his great-great-grandfather Riffle, a sheriff who took on an outlaw named Bossy Bop.
233	5	"Lights! Camera! Action!: A Movie Adventure"	Different film genres Helping friends	David; Grace; Melanie	September 19, 2008
Melanie decides to help Grace's food drive by putting on a movie premiere with a canned food admission price.
234	6	"To Catch a Thief: A Mystery Adventure"	Acceptance	Joshua (cameo); Marcos; Tracy	September 22, 2008
When many different balls disappear without a trace, BJ is determined to find the mysterious thief.
235	7	"The Magic Lamp: A Travel Adventure"	Culture of Lebanon	Chloe (cameo); Daniel; David; Layla	September 23, 2008
Layla feels disappointed with her culture, despite the fact that it is her birthday. With a little help from Barney, she goes on a trip to Lebanon and learns more about her heritage.
236	8	"The Amazing Captain Pickles: A Hero Adventure"	Honesty	Emma; Ryan	September 24, 2008
BJ learns a lesson about bragging when he tells everyone that he, as Captain Pickles, can leap over the moon. Baby Bop has some serious doubts about who is the greatest superhero. Barney then helps BJ learn the importance of being honest.
237	9	"A Game for Everyone: A Sports Adventure"	Sports; Inclusion	Jill; Marcos; Mei (cameo); Myra; Taylor	September 25, 2008
Barney, Baby Bop, BJ, and the kids are planning a Sports Day in the park. When Barney and Baby Bop meet Jill, a new friend who is too shy to participate, Barney explains that Jill might just need a little encouragement to join the fun.
238	10	"The Reluctant Dragon: A Fairy Tale Adventure"	Dealing with fears Charity	David; Emma; Tracy	September 26, 2008
Barney teaches that not everyone can tell from the outside what someone might be like on the inside. He does it by telling a story about a dragon that wasn't at all what others thought she was. The villagers were afraid of her, but it turns out, she was not scary at all and was a very nice dragon who liked to knit socks and drink tea.

=== Season 13 (2009) ===
No. overall	No. in season	Title	Educational theme	Cast of children	Original release date
239	1	"Bienvenido, Barney: Mexico"	Mexico	Emma; Joshua (cameo); Kioko (cameo)	September 7, 2009
Monty passes through the park with a flock of friends on their way to Mexico. When Monty gets left behind by his insect friends and family, Barney takes everyone on a visit to Mexico, where Baby Bop will say goodbye to her butterfly friend. Note: This episode is a shortened version of the "Let's Go on Vacation" DVD.
240	2	"Big Brother Rusty: China"	Chinese culture Appreciating siblings	Eli (cameo); Rusty; Taylor (cameo)	September 8, 2009
Barney's excited to find out that Rusty's family is adopting a new baby girl from China; however, Rusty feels differently. He isn't sure if he's going to be a good brother, and he doesn't know much about China. Barney takes him, BJ, and Baby Bop on an adventure to China where he can learn more about his new sister's heritage. By the time he returns to the park, Rusty excitedly meets his new baby sister and realizes he will be the best big brother ever.
241	3	"¡Ahora Mismo!: Spain"	Spain	Ben; Emma (cameo); Holly (cameo)	September 9, 2009
When Ben arrives too late to get a pony ride, he must learn how to wait the hard way. He's always wanted a horse and now it looks as if he's missed his opportunity. Barney then takes him to Spain where they meet a dancing horse named Regalo. Ben and Barney return to the park just in time for Ben to finally get a pony ride.
242	4	"Venice, Anyone?: Italy"	Culture of Italy; Taking tasks step by step	Emma; Joshua	September 10, 2009
Emma is frustrated with a school project about her family and cannot play soccer with Joshua. Noticing that her ancestors are from Venice, Barney takes her to Italy to learn more about her family's culture. They take a gondola ride, learn about Italian food, and make special masks.
243	5	"Sweeter Than Candy: Greece"	Culture of Greece; Self-limitation	Connor; Myra; Tracy	September 11, 2009
Barney, Baby Bop, and BJ are helping the park kids get ready for a school play. When Barney tells everyone that putting on shows began in Greece, they want to go visit. While there, they meet some friends and decide to put on a play in an amphitheatre. Barney knows a great story that originated in Greece called King Midas. By the end of the day, everyone has experienced another country and have learned that wanting too much is not a good thing.
244	6	"The Music Box: Switzerland"	Culture of Switzerland	Ben; Holly (cameo); Kioko (cameo)	September 14, 2009
The kids are having a yard sale, getting rid of old toys, books and clothes. Kioko shows up holding a prized possession which is a music box from Switzerland. By accident, Ben includes the music box in a cardboard box of yard sale items and the music box is sold. Kioko is sad and Ben wants to make things right, so he and Barney travel to Switzerland in search of a replacement gift. While there, they sample Swiss food, customs and games, but no music box. Luckily, when Ben returns, the music box has returned.
245	7	"The Good Egg: Kenya"	Culture of Kenya	Joshua; Natalia; Taylor	September 15, 2009
When the kids find a mysterious, colorful egg in the park, Barney takes them on a trip to Kenya to try to find out what kind of animal could have laid the egg. While in Kenya, they meet Ayira who introduces them to many people, cultures and animals of Kenya.
246	8	"A Bird of a Different Feather: Hawaii"	Hawaii	Ben; Rusty; Tracy	September 16, 2009
Barney takes the kids to Hawaii on a quest for a bird of paradise. While there, they meet some friends, learn new Hawaiian words, make a Hawaiian lei and dance a hula. Eventually, Barney and his friends find a bird of paradise, which was not really a bird, but a flower pretending to be one.
247	9	"Bonjour, Barney!: France"	France	Connor; Emma; Myra	September 17, 2009
Emma wants to paint an award-winning painting for the Art in the Park Show, but she is just not satisfied with her artwork. Barney then takes her to France to learn how to paint from his friend, Pierre. While there, they learn about France and how to paint by following their heart.
248	10	"Home Sweet Earth: The Rainforest"	Nature; Rainforests	Ben; Maya; Tracy	September 18, 2009
It's Earth Day, but Ben is wasting paper while BJ is not too concerned about cutting down a tree to make room for a new playground. After a trip to the rainforest and a meeting with Mother Nature, everyone learns the importance of taking care of people's world. As Earth Day comes to an end, Barney reminds them all that taking good care of people's Earth is the natural thing to do for everyone. Note: This episode is a shortened version of the "Barney's Jungle Friends" special.

=== Season 14 (2010) ===
No. overall	No. in season	Title	Educational theme	Cast of children	Original release date
249	1	"Gift of the Dinos: Winter"	TBA	TBA	October 4, 2010
"Gift of the Dinos": During a secret santa session, BJ and Riff decide to give up their prized possessions to give the ultimate gift to each other. "Winter": Baby Bop waits for the first snowfall of the year.
250	2	"Riff's Musical Zoo: Boats"	TBA	TBA	October 5, 2010
"Riff's Musical Zoo": After Tracy's mom can't take the kids to the zoo, Riff uses stuffed animals and musical instruments to mimic animals sounds to create a "musical zoo"! "Boats": BJ and Riff build a boat to take Baby Bop on a pretend boat ride.
251	3	"The Magic Caboose: Arts"	TBA	TBA	October 6, 2010
"The Magic Caboose": Barney and the kids board the magic caboose to take pretend trips to different countries. "Arts": Barney introduces his friends to different forms of art at an art festival.
252	4	"Movement: Separation"	TBA	TBA	October 7, 2010
"Movement": Coach Baby Bop and BJ help Barney prepare for the sack race. "Separation": After BJ and Riff leave for a camping trip, Baby Bop begins to have separation anxiety. So, Barney helps her figure out activities to pass the time.
253	5	"Pistachio: BJ's Snack Attack"	TBA	TBA	October 8, 2010
"Pistachio": After Barney eats too many pistachios, his friends show him the importance of eating them in moderation. "BJ's Snack Attack": BJ's binge on junk food leads him to dream about a world with only junk food.
254	6	"Bop 'til You Drop: Sharing"	TBA	TBA	October 11, 2010
"Bop 'til You Drop": Baby Bop's friends give her a whistle to signal for them to play together. When she becomes too bossy, Barney teaches her the importance of being a good friend. "Sharing": After Riff busts BJ's new scooter, he holds a rummage sale in order to buy a new one!
255	7	"Little Red Rockin' Hood: Differences"	TBA	TBA	October 12, 2010
"Little Red Rockin' Hood": Barney, Baby Bop, BJ, Riff, and the kids put on a twist on a classic fairy tale about how a wolf and a young girl combined their music together to form "Country Rock" "Differences": When the kids leave a boy in a wheelchair out of their fun, Barney decides to let him know that he feels the same way sometimes.
256	8	"Butterflies: The Nature of Things"	TBA	TBA	October 13, 2010
"Butterflies": Baby Bop cares for a caterpillar that is going through metamorphosis. "The Nature of Things": After Rachel makes a mess in the park, she dreams about how littering affects many animal homes.
257	9	"China: Welcome, Cousin Riff"	TBA	TBA	October 14, 2010
"China": BJ's Chinese Pen Pal visits the park. "Welcome, Cousin Riff": Barney informs Baby Bop and BJ that their cousin Riff has moved into town!
258	10	"Rabbits: Listen!"	TBA	TBA	October 15, 2010
"Rabbits": Detective BJ helps Baby Bop figure out which animal is eating her snacks. "Listen!": Barney's friends help Detective Riff figure out where a strange noise is coming from.
259	11	"The Big Garden: Get Happy!"	TBA	TBA	October 18, 2010
"The Big Garden": Barney, Baby Bop, BJ, and the kids harvest crops in the park's garden. "Get Happy!": Riff creates a device to make Olivia happy.
260	12	"Big as Barney: The Chase"	TBA	TBA	October 19, 2010
"Big as Barney": After observing the positive impact Barney has on his friends, Ryan decides that he wants to act and look just like Barney. "The Chase": After the kids fight over wanting to do the same thing, Barney tells them a Native American story that teaches to be yourself and not follow to the crowd.
261	13	"Playing Games: No, No, No!"	TBA	TBA	October 20, 2010
"Playing Games": Barney teaches Baby Bop the importance of following the rules when playing games with friends. "No, No, No!": Baby Bop is frustrated about hearing "No" all the time. So, Barney tells her the story of Cinderella.
262	14	"The Emperor's Contest: The Whole Truth"	TBA	TBA	October 21, 2010
"The Emperor's Contest": After Ryan thinks about cheating in a fishing contest, Barney tells him a story about how a boy became emperor by being honest. "The Whole Truth": After BJ takes credit for Sarah's painting, Barney teaches him to always be honest with his friends.
263	15	"Seeing: Beethoven's Hear!"	TBA	TBA	October 22, 2010
"Seeing": Baby Bop tries to convince to BJ and Riff that she had seen an elephant in the park. "Beethoven's Hear!": After Riff wonders if he would still like music if he was deaf, Barney introduces one of the best deaf musicians of all time - Beethoven.
264	16	"Best in Show: Ducks and Fish"	TBA	TBA	October 26, 2010
"Best in Show": Susan lets BJ enter her dog Pilgrim in a dog show! "Ducks and Fish": Riff takes care of some baby duck eggs.
265	17	"The Shrinking Blankey: Things I Can Do"	TBA	TBA	October 27, 2010
"The Shrinking Blankey": Baby Bop is concerned that she may be outgrowing her blankey. "Things I Can Do": After Baby Bop gets upset with the things she can do, Barney, Riff, and the kids help her find something else that she can do.
266	18	"Mother Goose: Fun with Reading"	TBA	TBA	October 28, 2010
"Mother Goose": Characters from The Land of Mother Goose come to the caboose in search for their lost things. "Fun with Reading": After BJ gets an injury while playing Captain Pickles, Barney and the kids have fun with books. They even write their own story!
267	19	"The Blame Game: Airplanes"	TBA	TBA	November 1, 2010
"The Blame Game": Marcos accidentally breaks Melanie's project and fears that she may not want to be his friend anymore. Barney teaches him that a good friend is an honest friend. "Airplanes": Barney's friends are playing with airplanes in the park. BJ allows Riff to play with his airplane toy. When Riff rearranges the airplane parts, he fears that he may have broken BJ's toy.
268	20	"The New Kid: The Princess and the Frog"	TBA	TBA	November 2, 2010
"The New Kid": After Riff befriends a new kid, BJ fears that Riff is not his friend any more. "The Princess and the Frog": After Baby Bop promises Ryan to watch his pet frog, Barney tells her the story of "The Princess and the Frog" to remind her to always keep her promises.
