= Dennis DeShazer =

American producer

- Born: Dennis Lloyd DeShazer; November 27, 1963 (age 62); Richardson, Texas, U.S.
- Education: Southern Methodist University
- Occupation: Producer

Dennis Lloyd DeShazer (born November 27, 1963) is an American producer best known as being one of the co-creators of the Barney franchise, having involvement and producing the video series Barney & the Backyard Gang and its successor Barney & Friends, alongside creator Sheryl Leach and co-creator Kathy Parker.

== Early life and career ==
DeShazer was a graduate of Southern Methodist University. He became a video writer and producer at DLM, Inc., an educational publishing company owned by Richard C. Leach. DeShazer was producing videotapes about how to buy and sell real estate at the time.

=== Barney the Dinosaur ===
DeShazer was later recruited by Richard's daughter Sheryl Leach to help her and Kathy Parker develop the video series Barney & the Backyard Gang where he was a producer, where he came up with the name Barney for the dinosaur. He served as an executive producer for The Lyons Group. 1992 saw the launch of the worldwide popular show Barney & Friends where Dennis was the executive producer alongside Kathy and Sheryl (until their departures in 1993 and 1998 respectively). Dennis helped oversee the production of 128 episodes of the series and numerous other Barney productions such as home videos, stage shows and a feature film. Dennis' final year with the franchise was 2000 when he left and was succeeded by Randy Dalton in 2001 during the production of season seven.

=== Boz the Bear ===
In 2003, DeShazer, alongside Jon Green who worked at Lyrick Studios, co-founded Exclaim Entertainment, LLC to produce family entertainment with a Christian perspective. The project they worked on through the company was Boz the Green Bear.
