= Barney & Friends =

American children's television series

- Genre: Children's television series; Educational; Adventure; Musical
- Created by: Sheryl Leach; Kathy Parker; Dennis DeShazer
- Based on: Barney & the Backyard Gang by: Sheryl Leach; Kathy Parker
- Voices of: Bob West; Duncan Brannan; Tim Dever; Dean Wendt; Julie Johnson; Patty Wirtz; Michaela Dietz
- Opening theme: "Barney Theme Song"
- Ending theme: "Barney's Dilemma" (1992–2000) "Barney Theme Song" (instrumental) (2002–2010)
- Composers: Philip Parker (1990–1999); Bob Singleton (1990–2000); Joe Phillips (1996–2009); Holly Doubet; Angelo Natalie
- Country of origin: United States
- Original language: English
- No. of seasons: 14
- No. of episodes: 268 (list of episodes)

Production
- Executive producers: Sheryl Leach (1988–1998); Kathy Parker (1988–1993); Dennis DeShazer (1988–2002); Randy Dalton (2002–2005); Karen Barnes (2006–2009)
- Production locations: Allen, Texas (1992–1993; 2000–2001); Irving, Texas (1994–2000); Carrollton, Texas (2002–2009)
- Camera setup: Multi-camera setup
- Running time: 30 minutes (1992–2005, 2008–2009); 15 minutes (2006–2007, 2010)
- Production companies: The Lyons Group; Connecticut Public Television (1992–2006); Lyrick Studios (1994–2000); HIT Entertainment (2002–2010); WNET New York (2008–2010)

Original release
- Network: PBS
- Release: April 6, 1992 – November 2, 2010

Related
- Barney & the Backyard Gang; Barney's World

Barney & Friends is an American television series aimed at preschool children created by Sheryl Leach. The flagship production of the Barney franchise, it originally aired on PBS through the PBS Kids block from April 6, 1992, to November 2, 2010, although new videos were still released on various dates after the last episode aired. It features and stars Barney the Dinosaur, an anthropomorphic purple Tyrannosaurus rex who conveys educational messages through songs and small dance routines with a friendly, huggable and optimistic attitude. Reruns aired on Sprout from 2005 to 2015, and from December 17, 2018, to January 25, 2020, on Sprout's successor network, Universal Kids, until the latter's closure on March 6, 2025. On October 6, 2015, the series was initially renewed for revival with a new season to premiere in 2017, but that never came to fruition. A CGI-animated series Barney's World aired on Cartoon Network's Cartoonito on October 18, 2024, and streamed on HBO Max on October 14, 2024.

While popular with its intended audience, Barney & Friends drew severe negative reaction from adults, who mocked the title character in popular culture through song parodies, comedy routines such as being beaten up by NBA star Charles Barkley on a Saturday Night Live episode, and even the United States Army using music from the children's show to psychologically torture and interrogate Iraqi prisoners of war.

== History and development ==
Barney & Friends was created by Sheryl Leach of Dallas, Texas. She came up with the idea of a children's program after noticing that her son outgrew Wee Sing Together, and then recognizing that there were no videos to appeal to her son. Leach then brought together a team who created a series of home videos, Barney & the Backyard Gang, initially released in 1988. The first three videos starred actress Sandy Duncan.

One day in 1991, the daughter of Connecticut Public Television executive Larry Rifkin rented one of the videos and was "mesmerized" by it. Rifkin thought the concept could be developed for PBS. Rifkin thought Barney had appeal because he was less neurotic than Big Bird. He pitched it to CPTV president Jerry Franklin, whose preschool son also fell in love with it. Franklin and Rifkin pitched the idea to all of their colleagues with preschoolers, and they all agreed that kids would love a Barney show. Franklin and Rifkin convinced Leach to let CPTV revamp the concept for television. The show debuted as Barney & Friends in 1992. The series was produced by CPTV and Lyrick Studios (later bought by HIT Entertainment).

Although the show was a runaway hit, PBS initially opted not to provide funding beyond the initial 30-episode run. When Rifkin and other CPTV executives learned this, they wrote letters to their fellow PBS member stations urging them to get PBS to reconsider. The Lyons Group, meanwhile, sent out notices through the Barney Fan Club, telling parents to write letters and make phone calls to their local PBS stations to show their support for Barney & Friends. By the time of the yearly member stations' meeting, station executives across the country were up in arms over the prospect of one of their most popular shows being canceled. Faced with an atmosphere that Rifkin later described as "like an insurrection", PBS ultimately relented.

For several years, the show was taped at the Color Dynamics Studios facility at Greenville Avenue & Bethany Drive in Allen, Texas, after which it moved to The studios at Las Colinas in Irving, Texas, and then Carrollton, a suburb of Dallas. The series was produced by WNET from 2006 to 2010.

== Episode format ==
=== Opening sequence ===
The episodes open with the theme song (over clips from various episodes) and the title card before it dissolves into the school (in seasons 1–6) or park (in seasons 7–14). The children are seen doing an activity, occasionally relating to the episode's topic. They eventually cause Barney to come to life from a plush doll, transforming into the "real" Barney, how he appears in the children's imaginations. Beginning in season 9, Barney's transformation occurs in a clip at the end of the theme song.

=== Main sequence ===
Here, the main plot of the episode takes place. Barney and the children learn about the main topic of the episode, with Baby Bop, BJ, and/or Riff appearing during the episode and numerous songs themed relating to the subject featured in the series. The roles of Baby Bop, BJ, and Riff have grown larger in later seasons and later episodes venture outside of the school to other places within the neighborhood, and in season 13, to other countries around the world.

=== Closing sequence ===
Barney concludes with the song "I Love You", then the children say goodbye to him and leave. Barney dissolves back into his original stuffed form and winks at the viewer(s). The first story in season 10–11 episodes end with the characters singing "A Friend Like You" instead and Barney remaining alive.

The sequence transitions to Barney Says (in seasons 1–8 and 12 only) where Barney, who is off-screen, narrates what he and his friends had done that day, along with still snapshots from the episode. Barney ends the segment in seasons 1 and 2 by saying "I love you!" before the credits roll. In seasons 3–8 and 12, the segment ends with a pre-recorded clip of Barney saying, "And remember, I love you!" and waving goodbye.

== Characters and cast ==
=== Dinosaurs ===
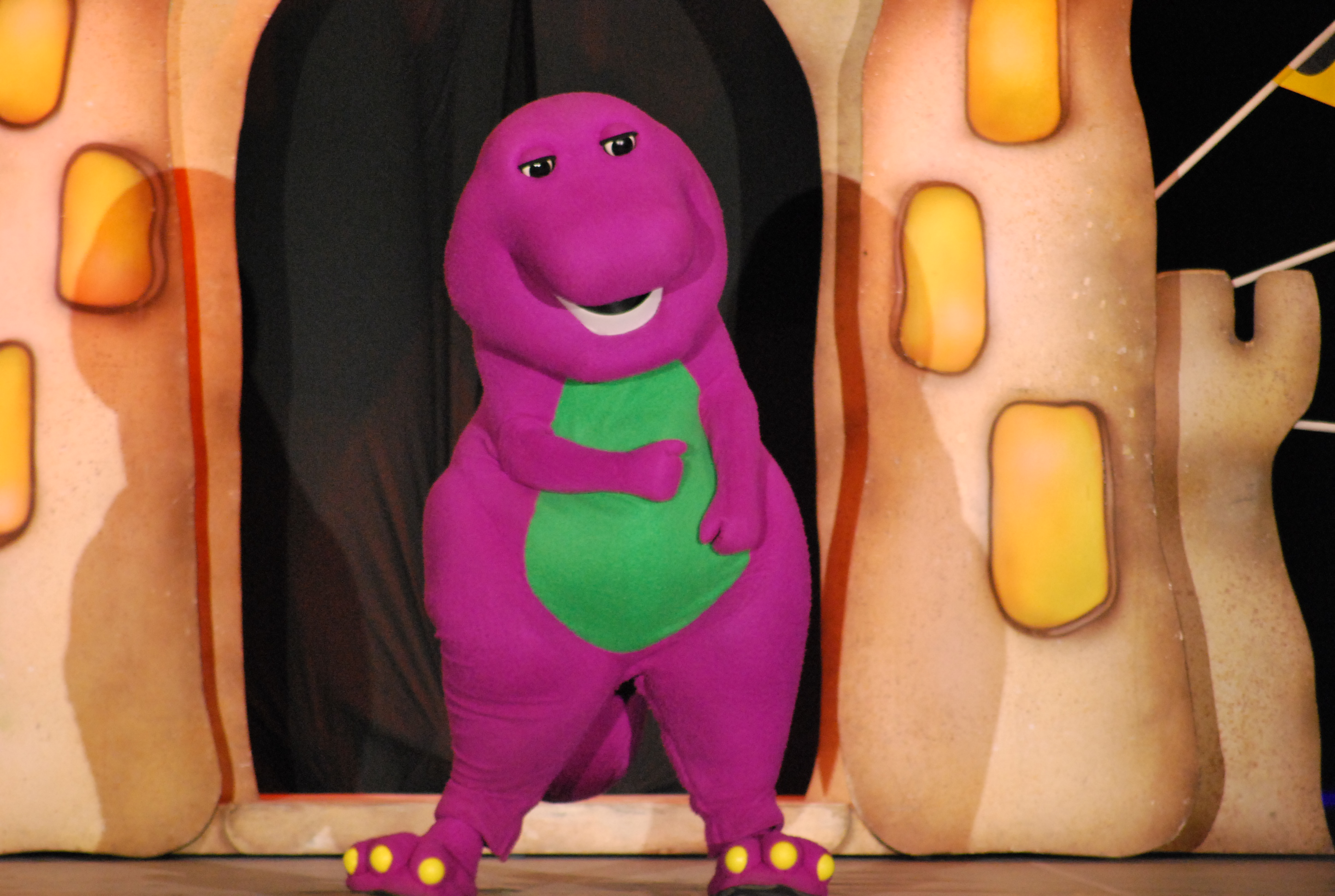
- Barney, the titular character
  Barney (voiced by Bob West 1992–2000, and Dean Wendt 2001–2010; people who wore the Barney suit included David Joyner 1991-2001 and Carey Stinson): The titular character is an anthropomorphic purple and green Tyrannosaurus in stuffed animal likeness, who comes to life through the children's imagination. His theme song is "Barney is a Dinosaur", whose tune is based on "Yankee Doodle". Barney often quotes things as being "Super dee-duper". Episodes frequently end with the song "I Love You", sung to the tune of "This Old Man". Despite being a carnivorous type dinosaur, Barney does not have a carnivore's fearsome teeth. He likes many different foods such as fruits and vegetables, but his main favorite is a peanut butter and jelly sandwich with a glass of milk.
- Baby Bop (voiced by Julie Johnson): An anthropomorphic green and pink Triceratops, who was originally two years old, but turned three in the episode "Look at Me, I'm 3!". Baby Bop has been on the show since her debut in "Barney in Concert" on July 29, 1991. She wears a pink bow and pink ballet slippers and often carries a yellow security blanket. She sings the song "My Yellow Blankey" to show how much her security blanket means to her. She likes to eat macaroni and cheese and pizza. She is the younger sister of BJ.
- BJ (voiced by Patty Wirtz): A seven-year-old anthropomorphic yellow and green Protoceratops, BJ has been on the show since September 27, 1993. He is the older brother of Baby Bop, whom he frequently calls "sissy" and occasionally calls by her name. He sings "BJ's Song" about himself. He wears a red baseball cap and red sneakers. He lost his hat in the episode "Hats Off to BJ!". Pickles are his favorite food and he has tried them in various ways, such as on pizza.
- Riff (voiced by Michaela Dietz): A six-year-old anthropomorphic orange and green Hadrosaur, who is Baby Bop and BJ's cousin, Riff has been on the show since September 18, 2006. He wears green sneakers. His theme music is "I Hear Music Everywhere". Riff loves music and it is in almost everything he does. In the episode "Barney: Let's Go to the Firehouse", it was revealed that Riff also likes to invent things; he created a four-sound smoke detector (the first three were different alarm sounds and the final one his voice). He is shown to have an interest in marching bands and parades.

=== Adults and children ===
The adults and children on the show often appear as teachers, storytellers, or other characters.

==== Multiple appearances ====
| Role | Actor | Description and Appearances |
|---|---|---|
| Mother Goose | Sandy Walper, Michelle McCarel, Julie Johnson | The rhyme master herself appears in the episodes "Let's Help Mother Goose", "Honk! Honk! A Goose on the Loose", "A Little Mother Goose", "Barney's Big Surprise", and "Mother Goose/Fairy Tales". |
| Stella the Storyteller | Phyllis Cicero | Stella travels all around the world, collecting new stories to tell Barney and friends, among other people. She appeared in several episodes from seasons 3 to 6 but reappeared in the video The Best of Barney, where she gave Barney a photo album of his friends over the years she made herself. After she finishes a story and when she says goodbye in every foreign language, she says her catchphrase "Toodles!" before closing the door. |
| Tomie dePaola | Himself | The famous children's author is also a good friend of Barney and usually meets his friends in the episodes he appeared in, which are "Picture This", "It's Raining, It's Pouring", and "Oh Brother, She's my Sister". |
| Mom | Sandy Duncan | Michael and Amy's mother in the first three Barney & the Backyard Gang videos. Duncan also appeared as Molly the Mermaid in A Day at the Beach. |
| Dad | Bob Reed | Michael and Amy's father in the first three Barney & the Backyard Gang videos. |
| Mr. Boyd | Robert Sweatmon | His full name is Grady Boyd and he has a niece named Colleen and a dog named Bingo. He worked as a musician in "Classical Cleanup", "Barney's Band", "Come Blow Your Horn!" and "Play Piano with Me!", a janitor in seasons 3 to 6 and a park keeper in seasons 7 and 8. He later reappeared in The Best of Barney. |
| Colleen | Claire Burdett | Colleen is Mr. Boyd's niece, who comes to town for a visit and is introduced to Barney and the Children. She is a congenital amputee born without her right hand, as is her actress. She appeared in two episodes, "A New Friend!" and "A Perfectly Purple Day". |
| Linda | Adrianne Kangas | Linda is Chip's younger sister who appeared in Seasons 5–6, as well as two home videos. |
| David | Robert Hurtekant | David is a boy in a wheelchair who appeared at the beginning of two episodes: "Falling for Autumn!" and "Shawn and the Beanstalk". |

=== Puppets ===
A lot of puppets appeared in many seasons. The most notable puppets were:

- Scooter McNutty, a brown squirrel (seasons: 4–6, 1997–2000) performed and voiced by Todd Duffey
- Miss Etta Kette, a purple bird (seasons: 4–6, 1997–2000) performed and voiced by Brice Armstrong; Armstrong also voiced Beauregard the Cat in the video It's Time for Counting.
- Booker T. Bookworm, an orange worm with interests in books (season 5: 1998–1999) performed and voiced by Earl Fisher

=== Children ===
Throughout the series' run, over 100 children have appeared in the series, with most of them from the Dallas-Fort Worth metroplex. Only a small portion of these actors have made notable appearances in media since their roles, including:

- Danielle Vega: played Kim in seasons 4–6
- Demi Lovato: played Angela in seasons 7–8
- Selena Gomez: played Gianna in seasons 7–8
- Peyton Alex Smith: played Jamal in season 10
- Debby Ryan: played Debby in season 10
- Madison Pettis: played Bridget in season 10
- Jaren Lewison: played Joshua in seasons 12–13

== Episodes ==
| Season | Episodes | Originally released | |
| Season | Episodes | First released | Last released |
|---|---|---|---|
| 1 | 30 | April 6, 1992 | May 15, 1992 |
| 2 | 18 | September 27, 1993 | October 20, 1993 |
| 3 | 20 | February 27, 1995 | October 6, 1995 |
| 4 | 20 | November 3, 1997 | November 28, 1997 |
| 5 | 20 | November 2, 1998 | April 16, 1999 |
| 6 | 20 | November 1, 1999 | April 14, 2000 |
| 7 | 20 | September 2, 2002 | November 22, 2002 |
| 8 | 20 | September 15, 2003 | May 14, 2004 |
| 9 | 20 | September 6, 2004 | May 13, 2005 |
| 10 | 20 | September 18, 2006 | October 13, 2006 |
| 11 | 20 | September 17, 2007 | October 12, 2007 |
| 12 | 10 | September 15, 2008 | September 26, 2008 |
| 13 | 10 | September 7, 2009 | September 18, 2009 |
| 14 | 20 | October 4, 2010 | November 2, 2010 |

== Broadcast and streaming ==
Other than the United States, the series has aired in Canada, Mexico and Latin America, France, Ireland, Italy, Malaysia, Spain, the United Kingdom, Japan (on English-based DVDs under the name "Let's Play with Barney in English! (バーニーと英語であそぼう！, Bānī to Eigo de asobō!)" and on television as simply "Barney & Friends (バーニー&フレンズ, Bānī ando Furenzu!)"), the Philippines, Hong Kong, Taiwan, Singapore (The Mandarin dubbing was produced in China and broadcast in Singapore), Turkey, Australia, and New Zealand, among others. Australian based company and distributor Southern Star handled non-US rights to the series from the mid-'90s until 2001 when HIT revoked the deal after acquiring Lyrick Studios.

Two known co-productions of Barney & Friends have been produced outside of the US. The Israeli co-production Hebrew: החברים של ברני Hachaverim shel Barney (The Friends of Barney) produced from 1997 to 1999 in Tel Aviv, was the first of these. Rather than dubbing the original American episodes in seasons 1 to 3, the episodes were adapted with a unique set and exclusive child actors. The second co-production was broadcast in South Korea from 2001 to 2003 on KBS (under the name "바니와 친구들" (Baniwa Chingudeul (Barney and Friends))). This one, however, adapted the first six seasons (including the first three that the Israel co-production did).

Various episodes are available on an official YouTube channel, and episodes from seasons 7 to 14 are available on streaming platforms including Peacock, Tubi, The Roku Channel, and Plex.

== Music ==
The show's theme song was "I Love You", with original lyrics sung to the melody of the public domain song "This Old Man". The new lyrics were written for the melody in 1982 by Indiana homemaker Lee Bernstein for a children's book titled "Piggyback Songs" (1983), and these lyrics were adapted by Barney producers in the early 1990s, without knowing the words had been written by Bernstein. Upon discovering the usage of her lyrics, Bernstein retained lawyer Daniel Glavin who negotiated with Barney producers for writing credit and royalties, reported as a one-time payment of $7,500 plus $2,000 "every several years." In 1994 when Barney-related licensing was bringing in an estimated $50 million for the Lyons Group, Bernstein sought a higher royalty payment in court.

The song was among those used by interrogators at Guantanamo Bay detention camp to coerce detainees. A US soldier told Newsweek: "Trust me, it works. In training, they forced me to listen to it for 45 minutes. I never want to go through that again." In 2018, Emily Writes of The Spinoff wrote: "I don't know any kids who watch it these days but I do know [...] that a shit load of parents continue to be haunted by the Barney theme tune."

Demi Lovato and Jimmy Fallon performed a heavy metal cover of the song in 2008.

A majority of the albums of Barney & Friends feature Bob West as the voice of Barney; however, the recent album The Land of Make-Believe has Dean Wendt's voice.

The United States and United Kingdom Armies has used music from Barney the Dinosaur - along with music from Sesame Street and Metallica - to psychologically torture and interrogate Iraqi POWs, by causing sleep deprivation and culturally offend the POWs by playing the music.

== Home media ==
In August 2000, a direct-to-video Barney release Come on Over to Barney's House was released on VHS and DVD.

== Awards and nominations ==
| Year | Award | Recipient | Result |
|---|---|---|---|
| 1993 | Daytime Emmy for Outstanding Children's Series | Sheryl Leach, Kathy Parker, Dennis DeShazer | Nominated |
| 1993 | Daytime Emmy for Outstanding Writing in a Children's Series | Stephen White, Mark S. Bernthal | Nominated |
| 1994 | Daytime Emmy for Outstanding Achievement in Live and Tape Sound Mixing and Sound Effects | Ron Balantine, David M. Boothe | Nominated |
| 1994 | Daytime Emmy for Outstanding Children's Series | Sheryl Leach, Kathy Parker, Dennis DeShazer | Nominated |
| 1996 | Daytime Emmy for Outstanding Pre-School Children's Series | Sheryl Leach, Dennis DeShazer, Jim Rowley | Nominated |
| 1998 | Daytime Emmy for Outstanding Lighting Direction | Ken Craig, Murray K. Campbell | Nominated |
| 1998 | Daytime Emmy for Outstanding Sound Mixing | Ron Balantine, David M. Boothe, Gary French | Nominated |
| 1999 | Daytime Emmy for Outstanding Directing | Jim Rowley, Fred Holmes, Steve Feldman | Nominated |
| 1999 | Daytime Emmy for Outstanding Live and Direct to Tape Sound Mixing | Ron Ballantyne, David M. Boothe, Gary French | Nominated |
| 2000 | Daytime Emmy for Outstanding Live and Direct to Tape Sound Mixing | Ron Ballantyne, David M. Boothe, Gary French | Nominated |
| 2001 | Daytime Emmy for Outstanding Live and Direct to Tape Sound Mixing | Ron Ballantyne, David M. Boothe, Gary French | Won (tied with Who Wants to Be a Millionaire) |
| 2003 | Daytime Emmy for Outstanding Sound Mixing – Live Action and Animation | Patrick Sellars, Neal Anderson | Nominated |
| 2006 | Daytime Emmy for Outstanding Directing | Jim Rowley, Fred Holmes, Steve Feldman | Nominated |
| 2008 | Daytime Emmy for Outstanding Achievement in Costume Design/Styling | Lisa Odette Albertson, Traci Hutton, Lyle Huchton | Nominated |
| 2009 | Daytime Emmy for Outstanding Achievement in Costume Design/Styling | Lisa Odette Albertson, Traci Hutton, Lyle Huchton | Nominated |

== Reception and legacy ==
=== Reception ===
Several people have concluded that episodes contain a great deal of age-appropriate educational material, including Yale University researchers Dorothy and Jerome Singer, who called the program a "model of what preschool television should be". Others have criticized the show for a lack of educational value, as well as being repetitive.

Andrea Graham from Common Sense Media rated the show a four out of five starts, noting it as a "a well-loved veteran in children's television. [...] Every episode is filled with song and dance, and Barney really encourages little ones to get up and boogie along. Barney and his friends also love crafting and will likely inspire your child's creative side. Among all the fun, each episode is based on a pro-social theme such as respect, teamwork, and courtesy for others." She also stated that, "While Barney & Friends does offer quality entertainment for kids, parents should know that the show's songs have been criticized for being overly infectious and may wind up stuck in your head. And while preschoolers will love watching Barney's adventures, older kids may find the program's happy, sappy style a little too much. Nonetheless, Barney & Friends is a well-loved classic and will likely continue to delight preschoolers for years to come".

=== Legacy ===
The show is often cited as a contributing factor to the perceived sense of entitlement seen in millennials, who grew up watching the show. One specific criticism is:

His shows do not assist children in learning to deal with negative feelings and emotions. As one commentator puts it, the real danger from Barney is "denial: the refusal to recognize the existence of unpleasant realities. For along with his steady diet of giggles and unconditional love, Barney offers our children a one-dimensional world where everyone must be happy and everything must be resolved right away."

In 1992, the Barney franchise generated $500 million in retail sales.

The creator and performer of the San Diego Chicken mascot, Ted Giannoulas, called Barney a "ubiquitous and insipid creature" in a 1999 court case.

Barney & Friends ranked No. 50 on TV Guide's 2002 list of the 50 worst TV shows of all time.

In a 1993 newspaper article, Jerry Franklin, the head of Connecticut Public Television, which co-produced Barney & Friends at the time, was quoted thus:

When adults say they do not like Barney, Franklin says, 'in a way, we take that as a compliment. Barney is not designed for parents, whereas Sesame Street is designed for parents and children. We made a conscious decision to make Barney simple. It is not a program for parents. Barney relates to preschoolers. We think he speaks to them at their level, which is in simple terms and with music.

Howard Blumenthal, producer of Where in the World Is Carmen Sandiego?, said "Even the most knowledgeable people ... can't really understand why that [Barney] phenomenon happened and another didn't".
