= Sheryl Leach =

American children's show creator

- Born: Sheryl Lyna Stamps; December 31, 1952 (age 73); Athens, Texas, U.S.
- Occupations: Author, television producer, television writer
- Years active: 1987–present
- Known for: Creator of Barney & Friends (1992–2010)
- Spouse: James Edmond (m. 1982; div. 2001); Howard Rosenfeld
- Children: 1

Sheryl Lyna Stamps Leach (born December 31, 1952) is an American author who created the children's show Barney & Friends with Kathy Parker and Dennis DeShazer.

== Early life ==
Leach holds a bachelor's degree in elementary education from Southern Methodist University (SMU) and a master's degree in bilingual education from Texas A&M University - Commerce.

== Career ==
In the late 1980s, Sheryl Leach, along with Kathy Parker and Dennis DeShazer, came up with the concept for a children's television show featuring a purple dinosaur named Barney. They believed that such a character could help young children learn important life lessons and skills in a fun and engaging way. Inspired by their own experiences as parents, they created the character and developed the show's format.

Leach, a former teacher, worked with Parker and DeShazer on what would become the TV show in 1987. Originally, the star of the show was envisioned as a teddy bear, but since her toddler son sparked an interest in dinosaurs, the character was changed to a dinosaur. Leach and her team created a series of home videos called Barney and the Backyard Gang, which were sold directly to the public. In 1991, after Connecticut Public Television employee Larry Rifkin rented a Barney video for his daughter, he spoke with the creators about putting Barney on television. In October of that year, production began on the new TV show, titled Barney & Friends, and in April 1992, it premiered on PBS. Barney went onto receive a number of awards and honors.

The character of BJ was named after Leach's father, Billy Joe "B.J." Stamps. Her former brother-in-law, Tom Leach, was a director of special projects like 1998's My Party with Barney.

Leach served as an executive producer of the series until 1998, leaving co-creator Dennis DeShazer as executive producer until the HIT Entertainment acquisition. Leach made a brief return to the series in 2001 where she was tapped to consult with the crew about the changes for Season 7, further aiding the production for that season alongside Season 8 of the show. Leach became a shareholder at HIT Entertainment in which she held 35.5% of HIT shares alongside others. Following her time on Barney & Friends, Leach's name continued to be in the credits of videos as the "Founder/Creator".

In November 2026, Leach returned to public view, appearing in a video announcing the production of a documentary about the character of Barney, on which she is collaborating with Andrew Olsen, creator of the online fan community Barney History Fans.

== Personal life ==
While working as a writer at DLM Inc., Leach met James "Jim" Leach. Within a year, they dated and got married when she was 30 years old. Together, the two of them had a son named Patrick Leach. In the fall of 1987, Leach was stuck in a traffic jam thinking about the lack of videos that held the attention of her then two-year-old son, Patrick. This thought would lead to the creation of Barney & Friends and the preceding Barney & the Backyard Gang videos.

A bit of Leach's personal life during her time with the series was detailed in the documentary I Love You, You Hate Me, which she declined to be in.

On January 9, 2013, Leach's son Patrick was arrested for assault with a firearm. He was released on US$1 million bond. The incident stemmed from Patrick viewing security footage that led him to believe his 49-year-old neighbor was trespassing on his property. Patrick shot his neighbor in the chest following a "screaming match" in the latter's driveway. Patrick attempted to escape by vehicle, but was intercepted by authorities on the Pacific Coast Highway, several miles from the site of the incident. He was found in possession of a loaded handgun and rifle. His neighbor survived the encounter after being hospitalized in critical condition. In 2015, Patrick was sentenced to 15 years in prison for attempted murder, but was released after serving five years.

According to Variety, Sheryl likened the character of Barney to a "brother" of sorts for her son.

=== Philanthropy ===
Leach and her life partner Howard Rosenfeld have sponsored projects through their philanthropy organization the Shei'rah Foundation, including a number of documentaries and several youth-based media projects.

In 2007, Leach and Rosenfeld designed and built The Smithy, a specialty retail outlet in the village of New Preston in Litchfield County, Connecticut, that sells local artisanal foods and handicrafts.

Leach and Rosenfeld are also involved with community development, land conservation projects, and farming organizations in Litchfield County. They own and support two organic farms and were credited by Litchfield Magazine as one of the initiators of the "farm to table" movement in the area. They also co-founded the Farmer's Table Dinner program in 2011 together with Partners for Sustainable Healthy Communities.

== Accolades ==
Leach was nominated twice for Daytime Emmy Awards. She holds an honorary doctorate from Texas A&M University–Commerce.
