= Kathryn O'Rourke Parker =

American television producer

- Born: March 15, 1954 (age 72); Harbor Beach, Michigan, U.S.
- Education: East Michigan University
- Occupations: Teacher; producer; writer
- Spouse: Phillip Parker
- Children: 2

Kathryn "Kathy" O'Rourke Parker (born March 15, 1954) is a children's educational television producer and writer, best known for being co-creator of the popular children's show Barney & Friends with Sheryl Leach and Dennis DeShazer.

== Early life ==
Kathy received her B.S. in Special Education in 1976 and an M.A. in Learning Disabilities in 1979, both from Eastern Michigan University.

== Career ==
=== Early career ===
Parker taught in the field of special education in Michigan from 1976 to 1981, before moving to the state of Texas. From 1981 to 1987 she worked at DLM, Inc. of Allen, Texas marketing early childhood educational products and materials.

=== Barney ===
In 1987 Sheryl Leach began working on the idea that would become Barney & Friends. Leach originally envisioned a talking teddy bear character, but that changed due to her young son's fascination with dinosaurs. In March of 1988, Leach hired Kathy Parker to help develop the series by creating a competitive analysis of other children's series on the market. After being impressed with her work, Leach asked Parker to remain on the project as one of its developers. Leach and Parker’s shared involvement in Barney’s development also became a compelling marketing hook: two moms creating a children’s show together. Parker made many contributions to Barney's appearance including, that Barney having no sharp teeth and claws, as it would've scared her daughter and that he had to be a gender neutral color. Leach's father-in-law owned an educational publishing company. He invested financially in initial production of the Barney concept, and also added Dennis DeShazer, an SMU alumnus who worked for him as a video writer and producer. This original creative trio produced a series of home videos called Barney and the Backyard Gang, featuring actress Sandy Duncan, which were sold directly to the public. Parker's father, Raymond Joseph O'Rourke, predicted the series would be a hit, but was stunned by the major success.

In 1991, Connecticut Public Television programming executive Larry Rifkin rented a Barney tape for his then 4-year-old daughter, Leora, and promptly called Leach's company, The Lyons Group, to team up and produce 26 original episodes for PBS. Later that year, production began on a new TV show, entitled Barney & Friends. Each episode had a 30-minute run time and consisted of a group of children imagining a teachable moment or scenario, which Barney would address through song, dance, and storytelling. PBS briefly considered canceling the new series in 1992 after only 6 weeks on air, but ratings revealed the new show to be the network's highest rated children's program so it remained on air and in production. The series was produced by Lyrick Studios, which was later bought by HIT Entertainment. Kathy Parker went on to serve as co-executive producer of the series. Additionally, Parker served as publisher of Barney Books from 1992 to 1994, and helped develop many Barney toys and games with licensing partners. Kathy's husband, Phil Parker, wrote more than 100 songs for the Barney & Friends TV series, some of which achieved Gold or Platinum sales status. His work was nominated for a Grammy award for Best Children's Album.

== Personal life ==
Parker is married to Philip Parker, who was a songwriter for Barney & the Backyard Gang and the spin-off Barney & Friends.

=== Charitable work ===
The Parkers have invested their resources in many local North Texas charitable causes that benefit children. The Collin County Children's Advocacy Center named Kathy Parker as recipient of their Hero Of Hope Volunteer Award in 2002. She has served on the advisory board of the National Children's Alliance and National Children's Cancer Society, and was board president of the McKinney Education Foundation from 2011 to 2012.

On May 9, 2013, Kathy, alongside her husband Philip, donated a few Barney items to the Smithsonian National Museum of American History. Those included the script from the first video in the Barney & the Backyard Gang series, The Backyard Show, along with a Dakin Backyard Gang Barney Plush.

== Accolades ==
For her work of Barney & Friends, Parker was named a recipient of the 2016 Walt Disney Motif Award Award Advancement of Education Medal Of Honor in memoriam of Fred M. Rogers.
