= Macy's Thanksgiving Day Parade =

Annual parade in New York City

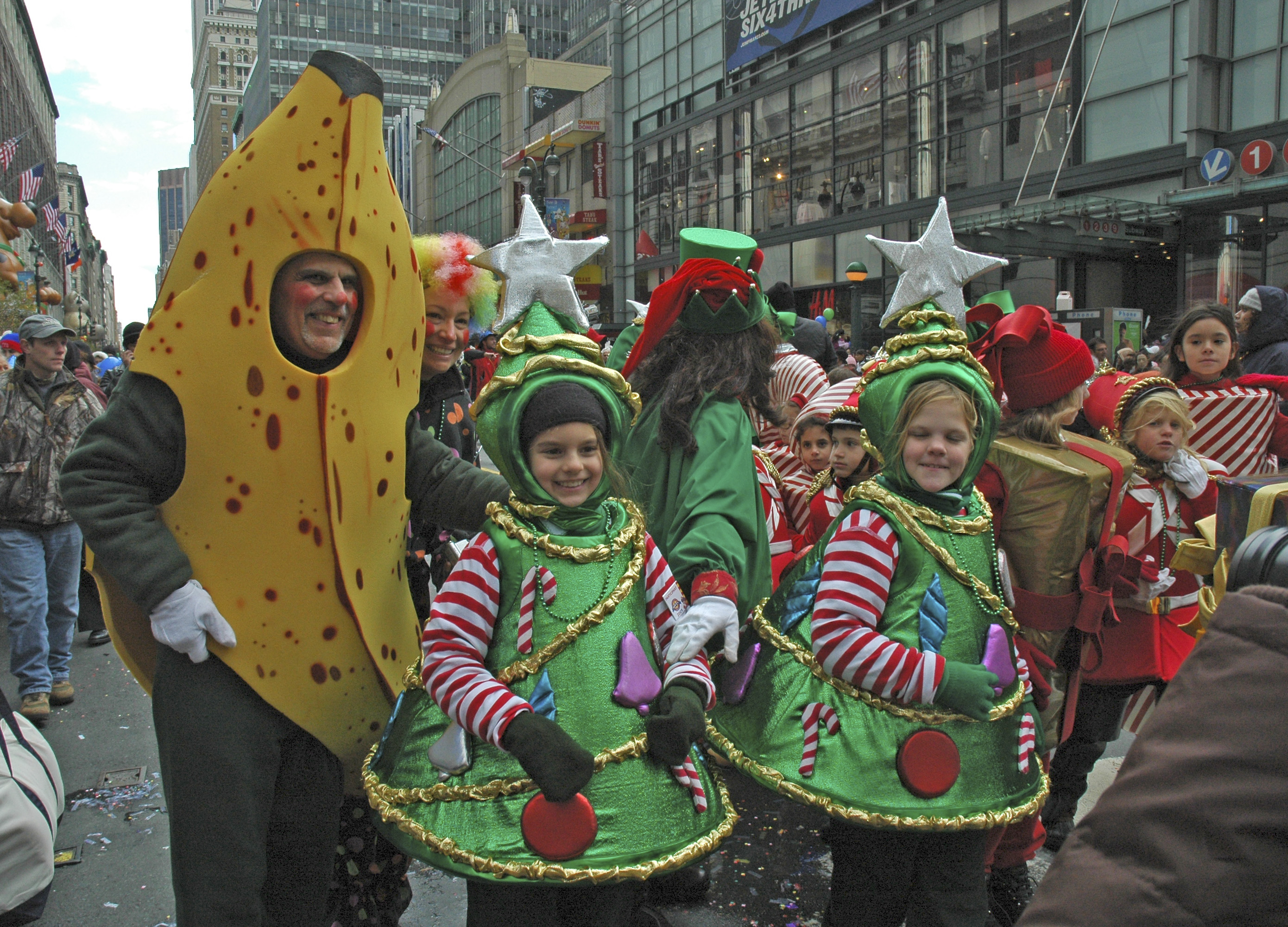
- 2005 parade
- Directed by: Dick Schneider (1972–1993); Gary Halvorson (1994; 1996–2014); Arthur Forrest (1995); Ron de Moraes (2015–16; 2018–2022); Ryan Polito (2017); Joe DeMaio (2023–present)
- Presented by: Savannah Guthrie; Hoda Kotb; Al Roker; (Former hosts)
- Opening theme: "Theme from New York, New York" (1995–present)
- Ending theme: "Santa Claus Arrives to the Parade"
- Composers: Sammy Fidler (1958–1965); Milton DeLugg (1966–2013); Ray Chew (2014–present)
- Country of origin: United States
- Original language: English

Production
- Executive producers: Brad Lachman (1994–2023); Bill Bracken (2021–23); Baz Halpin; Mark Bracco; Linda Gierahn
- Production locations: Central Park to Macy's Herald Square; New York City
- Camera setup: Videotape; Multi-camera
- Running time: 1968–2022: 3 hours (with commercials); 2023–present: 3 hours and 30 minutes (with commercials)
- Production companies: Macy's; NBC; Brad Lachman Productions

Original release
- Network: NBC
- Release: November 24, 1932 – November 27, 1952 (radio); November 23, 1939 – present (television)

Related
- Macy's 4th of July Fireworks; Macy's BalloonFest; My Macy's Holiday Parade; Lighting of the Macy's Great Tree; Christmas in Rockefeller Center

The Macy's Thanksgiving Day Parade, the world's largest parade, is an annual parade in New York City presented by the American department store chain Macy's. While not the first such event held in the United States, the Macy's Parade has become a traditional event watched by many millions of television viewers and in-person spectators each year. The parade was first held in 1924, tying it for the second-oldest Thanksgiving parade in the United States with America's Thanksgiving Parade in Detroit (with both parades being four years younger than Philadelphia's Thanksgiving Day Parade). The three-hour parade is held in Manhattan, ending outside Macy's Herald Square, and takes place from 8:30 a.m. to noon Eastern Standard Time on Thanksgiving Day, and has been televised nationally on NBC since 1953.

The 100th anniversary of the first parade was 2024. Since the parade was canceled during World War II (1942–1944), the 100th parade will take place in 2026.

== History ==
=== 1920s: Early history ===
Santa Claus in his Sleigh at the first Macy's Christmas Parade, November 27, 1924.

In 1924, store employees marched to Macy's Herald Square, the flagship store on 34th Street, dressed in vibrant costumes. There were floats, professional bands and live animals borrowed from the Central Park Zoo. At the end of that first parade, Santa Claus arrived at Herald Square. At this first parade, Santa was enthroned on the Macy's balcony at the store's 34th Street entrance, where he was then crowned "King of the Kiddies". With an audience of over 250,000 people, the parade was such a success that Macy's declared it would become an annual event, despite media reports only barely covering the first parade. The Macy's Thanksgiving Parade was influenced by the Macy's employees, who were mostly European immigrants.

A promotional poster for the fifth Macy's Christmas Parade.

The Macy's parade was enough of a success to decrease the popularity of Ragamuffin Day, the typical children's Thanksgiving Day activity from 1870 into the 1920s. Ragamuffin Day featured children going around and performing a primitive version of trick-or-treating, a practice that by the 1920s had come to annoy most adults. The public backlash against such begging in the 1930s (when most Americans were struggling in the midst of the Great Depression) led to promotion of alternatives, including the Macy's parade. While ragamuffin parades that competed with Macy's would continue into the 1930s, the competition from Macy's would overwhelm the practice, and the last ragamuffin parade in New York City would be held in 1956.

Tony Sarg enjoyed working with marionettes from an early age. After moving to London to start his own marionette business, Sarg moved to New York City to perform with his puppets on the street. Macy's heard about Sarg's talents and asked him to design a window display of a parade for the store.

=== 1930s–1980s: Growth ===
Through the 1930s, the parade continued to grow, with crowds of over one million people lining the parade route in 1933. The first Mickey Mouse balloon entered the parade in 1934. The annual festivities were broadcast on local radio stations in New York City from 1932 to 1941 and resumed in 1945, running through 1951.

The parade was suspended from 1942 to 1944 as a result of World War II because rubber and helium were needed for the war effort. The parade resumed in 1945 and became known nationwide shortly afterwards, having been prominently featured in the 1947 film Miracle on 34th Street, which included footage of the 1946 festivities. The event had its first broadcast on network television in 1948 (see § Television coverage). From 1984 to 2019, the balloons were made by Raven Industries of Sioux Falls, South Dakota, through its Raven Aerostar division.

Marching bands had been part of the parade since the beginning. In 1958, the first celebrity performances were added, as the Benny Goodman sextet joined the parade. Technical and logistical difficulties marred many of the early attempts to perform live music on moving stages, and in 1964, the parade began transitioning to lip sync.

Since 1985, the parade has traditionally been led by the New York City Police Department Highway Patrol. In 2019, the cast of Sesame Street led the parade in honor of the show's 50th anniversary.

=== 1990s–2000s: Safety changes ===
During the 1993 parade, strong gusts of wind pushed the Sonic the Hedgehog balloon into a lamppost at Columbus Circle. The lamppost damaged the balloon and the top of the post broke off while inside the balloon, dragging it down, injuring a child and an off-duty police officer in the process.

During the 1997 parade, very high winds pushed the Cat in the Hat balloon into a lamppost. The falling debris struck a parade-goer, fracturing her skull and leaving her in a coma for 24 days. The winds also caused trouble for the other balloons. The Barney the Dinosaur balloon veered out of control, was punctured by a streetlight and deflated. The Pink Panther balloon collapsed onto the ground and was stabbed by an NYPD inspector. Mayor Rudy Giuliani formed a task force in response, and numerous safety regulations were implemented the next year, including size restrictions that eliminated larger balloons such as the Cat in the Hat and the Pink Panther, the removal of lamppost arms on the parade route, and both physical training and lessons in balloon physics for handlers.

In 2001, in the aftermath of the September 11 attacks, which caused the collapse of the World Trade Center in New York City two months prior, there were debates about whether to cancel the parade. With the lingering scent of burnt metal and the continued rescue efforts being done at the World Trade Center site, some people felt it was insensitive to host the parade. Despite the backlash, the parade went on as scheduled, and it served as a symbol of resilience and a major step in the city's recovery after the attacks.

During the 2005 parade, the M&M's balloon collided with a streetlight in Times Square; parts of the light fell on two sisters, who suffered minor injuries. New safety measures were incorporated in 2006 to prevent accidents and balloon-related injuries. One measure taken was the installation of wind measurement devices to alert parade organizers to any unsafe conditions that could cause the balloons to behave erratically. In addition, parade officials implemented a measure to keep the balloons closer to the ground during windy conditions. New York City law prohibits Macy's from flying the full-size balloons if sustained winds exceed 20 knots (23 mph) or wind gusts exceed 30 knots (35 mph); New York's tall buildings and mostly uniform grid plan can amplify wind velocity on city streets. This law, imposed in 1997, has never been activated, despite several close calls; the only time the parade balloons were ever grounded was in 1971. Each balloon has a risk profile to determine handling in windy conditions; taller, upright balloons are rotated to appear horizontal and face downward in such situations (as was the case in 2019, when a grounding was narrowly averted). The remaining floats and performances will continue as scheduled should the balloons be grounded.

=== 2010s–2020s ===
The 2018 parade was the coldest to date, with the temperature at 19 °F (−7 °C) during the event. The warmest was in 1933 at 69 °F (21 °C). The 2006 parade was the wettest with 1.72 in (44 mm) of rain. Actresses Caitlin Kinnunen and Isabelle McCalla's kiss during The Prom's performance at the 2018 parade received significant media attention for being the first broadcast of a same-sex kiss in the parade's history.

Due to the COVID-19 pandemic in New York City, the 2020 parade was downsized and closed to the public, being filmed as a broadcast-only event in the Herald Square area. There were 88% fewer participants, and social distancing was enforced. The event did not include college and high school marching bands (with the affected bands having been reinvited for 2021), nor any participant under 18 years of age. Balloons were tethered to a "specially rigged anchor vehicle framework of five specialty vehicles" rather than carried by handlers. Mayor of New York City Bill de Blasio stated that it would not be "a live parade, but something that will really give us that warmth and that great feeling we have on Thanksgiving day." In 2021, the Macy's Thanksgiving Day Parade returned to its traditional in-person procession with 6,500 participants marching.

The NBC broadcast of the 2022 parade marked the first time that the broadcast was hosted entirely by women, as Al Roker was unable to host that year due to blood clots in his legs and lungs.

In 2023, the parade started half an hour earlier, at 8:30 am, making it the first parade to begin earlier in almost a century. Around 10am, pro-Palestinian protesters disrupted the parade in three locations. Some of the protesters, wearing white jumpsuits covered in fake blood, glued themselves to the parade route at Sixth Avenue near 45th street. The NYPD was quick to intervene and arrest the protestors before they held up the parade too long with their actions.

The parade will celebrate its 100th anniversary in 2026 with several revivals of past balloons and marionettes that have been featured over the course of the parade's history.

== Balloons ==
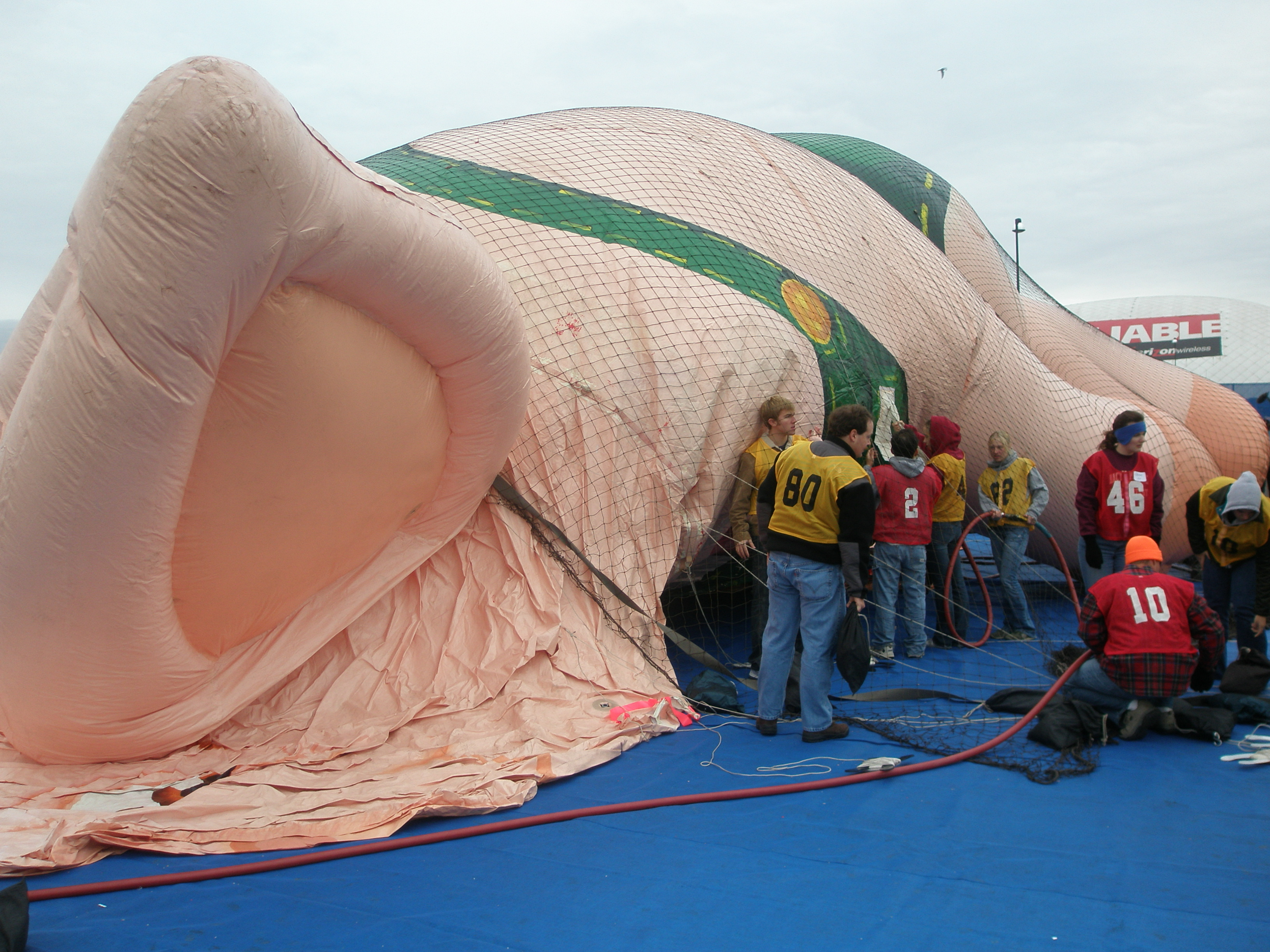
Hamlet the Balloon School Pig being inflated by the Steven's Inflation Crew during training at Giants Stadium

The Olaf balloon being inflated the night before the parade in 2018.

The first inflatable floats were large air-filled balloons and characters propped up with sticks, appearing in the parade in 1927; this replaced live zoo animals that were featured in the first parade. In 1928, Macy's switched from inflating the balloons with air to helium, making them float. That year, Sarg released the five balloons, set to leak slowly over the course of a week and then descend, with a reward of $100 (equivalent to $1,880 in 2025) for whoever found them; the reward amount fell to $50 the next year. In 1931, aviation pioneer Clarence Chamberlin spotted a dragon balloon midair, decapitated it with a wingtip, and brought the remnants back to land, where he claimed a $25 award. All but one of the balloons were recovered and returned, the lone exception being a blue hippopotamus balloon that drifted southeast past the Empire State Building after the 1931 parade and was never found. The practice of releasing the balloons ended in 1932, after a novice pilot attempting the same feat nearly crashed her plane. Sarg's large animal-shaped balloons were produced by the Goodyear Tire and Rubber Company in Akron, Ohio from the 1920s through 1980.

The balloons in the Macy's Thanksgiving Day Parade have had several varieties. The oldest is the novelty balloon class, consisting of smaller balloons ranging widely in size and handled by between one and thirty people (the smallest balloons are shaped like human heads and fit on the heads of the handlers). The larger and more popular class is the character balloons, primarily consisting of licensed pop-culture characters; each of these (16 in 2019) is handled by 90 people. Since 2005, the "Blue Sky Gallery" has transformed the works of contemporary artists into full-size balloons; a new balloon was featured each year until 2012, and more intermittently since then.

== Performers and acts ==
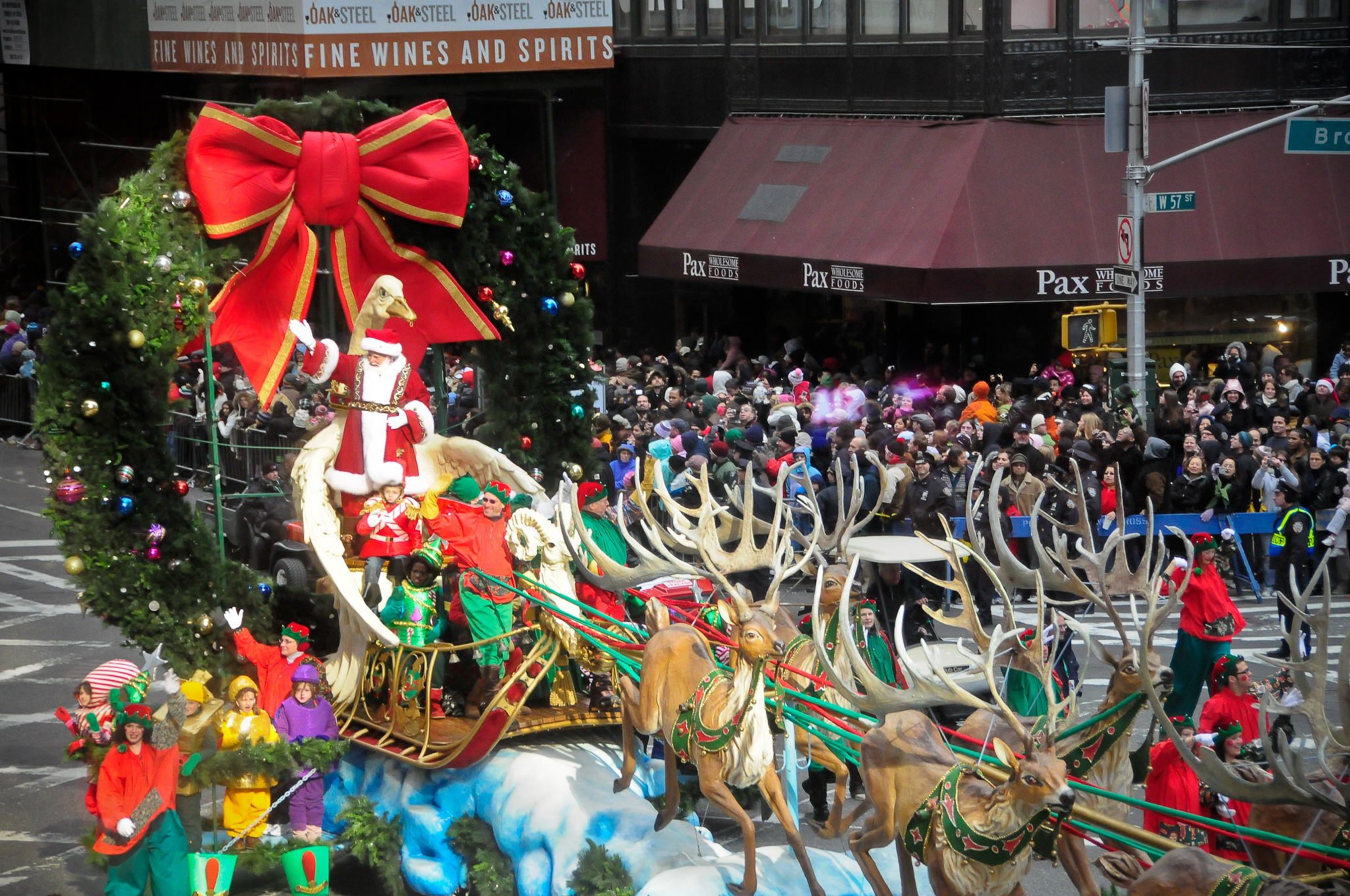
Santa Claus' arrival at the parade's finale marks the start of the Christmas season

In addition to the well-known balloons and floats, the parade also features live music and other performances. College and high school marching bands from across the country participate in the parade. The television broadcasts feature performances by established and up-and-coming singers and bands. This began in the 1960s, soon after the parade began to be televised. The Rangerettes, from Kilgore, Texas, the world's first precision drill team, known for their precision dance routines, are also a highlight of the event. The Rockettes of Radio City Music Hall are a classic performance (having performed annually since 1957 as the last pre-parade act to perform), as are cheerleaders and dancers chosen by the National Cheerleaders Association from various high schools across the country. The parade always concludes with the arrival of Santa Claus to mark the start of the Christmas and holiday season (except for the 1932 parade, when Santa led the parade). From 2017 to 2023, the Macy's Singing Christmas Tree choir precedes Santa Claus as the final performer of the parade (except 2022 and 2023, when they performed second-to-last).

On the NBC telecast from in front of the flagship Macy's store on Broadway and 34th Street, the marching bands perform live music. Most "live" performances by musicals and individual artists lip-sync to the studio, soundtrack or cast recordings of their songs, due to the technical difficulties of attempting to sing into a wireless microphone while in a moving vehicle (performers themselves typically perform on the floats with the exceptions being the Santa's Sleigh float and the Tom Turkey float); the NBC-flagged microphones used by performers on floats are almost always non-functioning props. Although rare, recent parade broadcasts have featured at least one live performance with no use of recorded vocals.

Every year, cast members from some Broadway shows (usually shows that debuted that year) perform either in the parade or immediately preceding the parade in front of Macy's and before The Rockettes' performance (since NBC broadcasts the parade's start, the performances are shown during the wait for the parade itself). The 2007 parade was notable as it took place during a strike by the I.A.T.S.E. (a stagehands' union). Legally Blonde, the one performing musical affected by the strike, performed in show logo shirts, with makeshift props and no sets. The other three shows that year performed in theaters that were not affected by the strike.

For the 10th anniversary of the September 11 attacks in 2011, the parade team invited family members from Tuesday's Children (a nonprofit organization that benefits families directly impacted by terrorism) to cut the ribbon at the start of the parade with co-host Al Roker and led the parade with Amy Kule, the Parade's executive producer.

Performers who are not part of Broadway shows or marching bands traditionally perform on floats. The cost to book the performers is covered by the floats' sponsors, who must also pay an entry fee to Macy's to participate in the parade. Since 2014, the entry fee and performer fee has hovered between $200,000 and $250,000.

== Television coverage ==
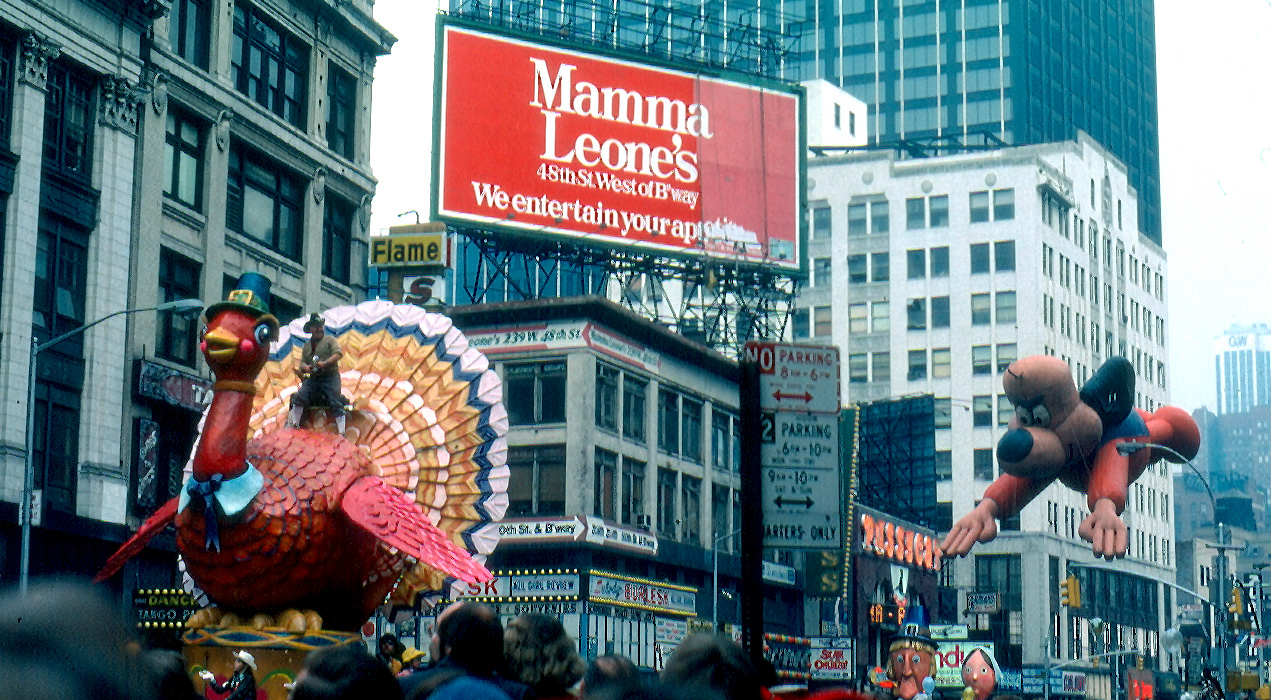
Tom the Turkey and Underdog arriving at Macy's Herald Square during the 1979 edition of the parade.

=== Official broadcasts ===
On an annual basis, more than 44 million people typically watch the Macy's Thanksgiving Day Parade on television, ranking among American television's most-watched annual events. In 2024, it was the most-watched United States television special of the year, outdrawing all of the major awards ceremonies, New Year events and Christmas specials; in 2025, the telecast was one of only five telecasts in the top 50 most-watched overall events of that year that was not a National Football League game. (The four others were two national championship games—the College Football Playoff championship and Game 7 of the 2025 World Series—and the second inauguration of, and a joint address to Congress by, U.S. President Donald Trump.)

The parade was first televised locally in New York City in 1939 as an experimental broadcast on NBC's W2XBS (now WNBC). It was not televised in 1940 or 1941, prior to the wartime suspension, but local broadcasts of the parade resumed when it returned in 1945. The parade made its first network television appearance on CBS in 1948, the year that major, regular television network programming began. NBC has been the official broadcaster of the event since 1953. As of 2024, NBC pays Macy's $20 million per year for the license to be the parade's official broadcaster; the parade earns a substantial profit for the network, with ad buys averaging $900,000 per 30-second commercial in 2023, a fee comparable to NBC Sunday Night Football, bringing in a gross revenue of $52 million. In November 2024, The Wall Street Journal reported that during negotiations to extend their broadcast contract for the parade and the Macy's 4th of July Fireworks Spectacular special for ten additional years, NBC offered to pay Macy's an increased license fee of $60 million to continue carrying the parade telecast. The renewal was officially announced on February 25, 2025, extending NBC's rights through 2035. The renewal will also include rights to a third Macy's-sponsored special to be held in the future.

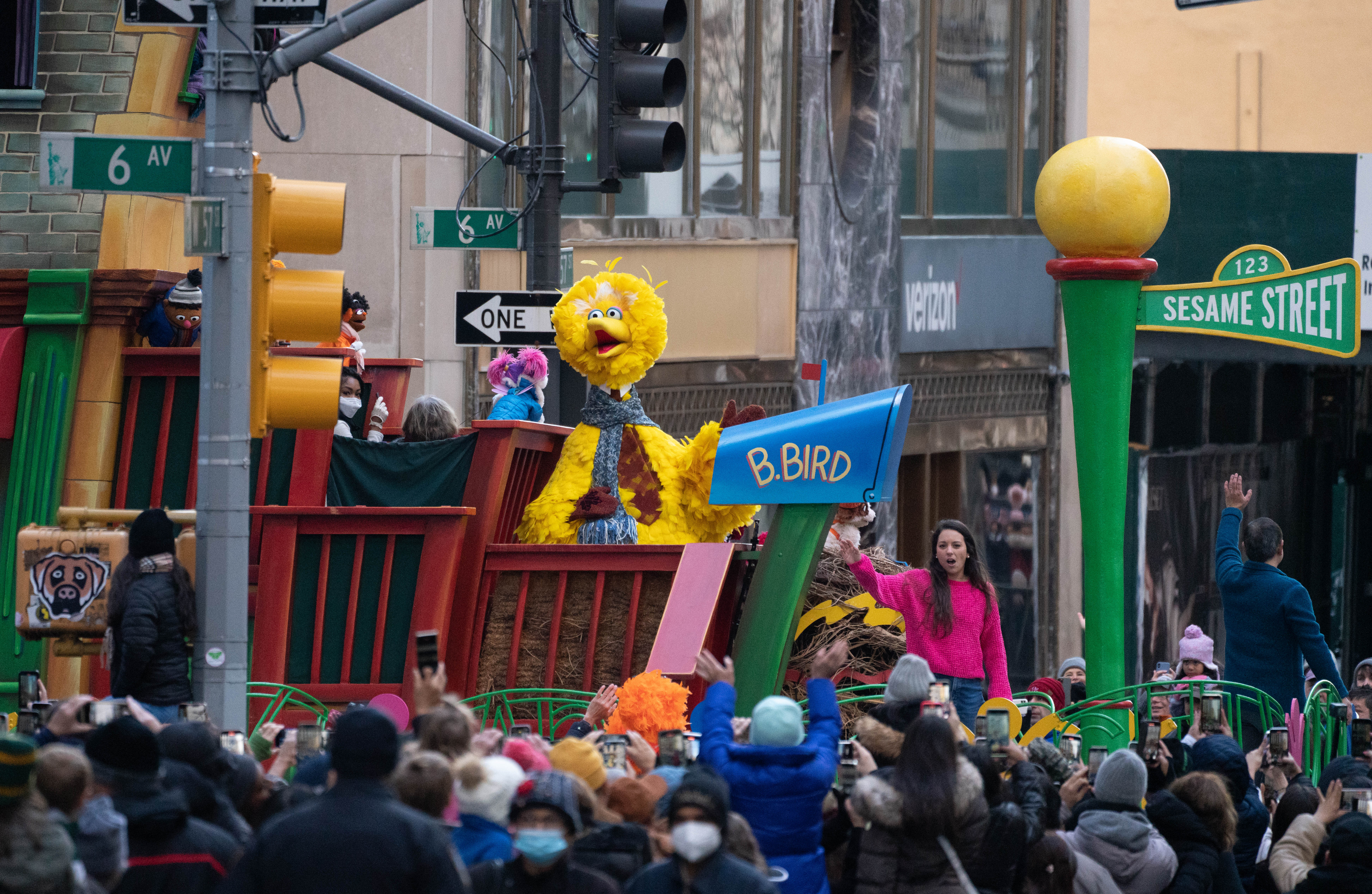
A Big Bird costume on a float at the 2022 Macy's Thanksgiving Day Parade in Manhattan

At first, the telecasts were only an hour long. The telecast then expanded to two hours in 1961, was reduced to 90 minutes in 1962, reverted to two hours in 1965, and expanded to cover all three hours of the parade in 1969. The event began to be broadcast in color in 1960. NBC airs the Macy's Thanksgiving Day Parade live in the Eastern Time Zone as well as Puerto Rico and the U.S. Virgin Islands, as the network uses broadcast feeds from that time zone (which due to time differences starts at 10:00 a.m. AST), but tape delays the telecast elsewhere in the continental U.S. and territories from the Central Time Zone westward to allow the program to air in the same 8:30 a.m. to 12:00 p.m. timeslot across its owned-and-operated and affiliated stations (except for Guam, which airs it the day after Thanksgiving at 8:30 a.m. local time, as the territory is located west of the International Date Line and therefore a day ahead from the rest of the United States). However, with the launch of Peacock in 2020 and branded extensions such as a virtual reality broadcast sponsored by Verizon, it is now possible to watch the parade live across the United States without any tape delay through Peacock or another international streaming service with rights to NBC's programming.

Following the morning program's addition of a third hour in October 2000 (it eventually expanded to four hours in September 2007), NBC's Today aired as an abbreviated two-hour broadcast on Thanksgiving morning, pre-empting the last two talk-focused hours of the show for the day to accommodate parade coverage. Starting with the parade's 2023 edition, when coverage was extended a half-hour earlier (to 8:30 a.m. Eastern Time from its longtime 9:00 a.m. start), the Thanksgiving edition of Today was cut to only 90 minutes (similar to the network's 2017 reduction of the program's Saturday broadcasts, which previously ran for two hours, to that same length to accommodate live telecasts of Premier League soccer matches held during the mid-morning to midday hours in the U.S.). Starting with the 2009 edition, NBC has aired a same-day, three-hour afternoon rebroadcast of the parade following the National Dog Show (replacing the annual broadcast of Miracle on 34th Street, as NBC declined to renew its contract to televise the film when the agreement expired in 2008). Some NBC affiliates preempt the Thanksgiving afternoon rebroadcast to air syndicated programs, local newscasts and/or locally produced specials in its place.

From 1963 to 1972, NBC's coverage was hosted by Lorne Greene (who was then appearing on NBC's Bonanza) and Betty White. David Hartman and Karen Grassle hosted the parade in 1974, with Ed McMahon serving as a location correspondent (McMahon would later become one of the main hosts from 1977 to 1981). Since 1982, NBC has appointed at least one of the hosts of Today to co-host the television broadcast, starting with Bryant Gumbel, who hosted the parade until 1984. From 1987 to 1997, NBC's coverage was hosted by longtime Today weather anchor Willard Scott. During that period, their co-hosts included Mary Hart, Sandy Duncan, and Today colleagues Deborah Norville and Katie Couric. In recent years, NBC's coverage has been hosted by Today anchors Matt Lauer (from 1998 to 2017), Meredith Vieira (from 2006 to 2010), Ann Curry (2011), Savannah Guthrie (since 2012) and Hoda Kotb (since 2018) as well as Today weather anchor Al Roker (since 1995, with the exception of 2022) who usually joins the producers of the parade or the CEO of Macy's and special guests in the ribbon cutting ceremony. In 2022, Dylan Dreyer filled in for Roker, who at the time was recovering due to recent health complications involving blood clots, while Kotb hosted the ribbon cutting ceremony segment when the parade reached Herald Square, rather than when it usually held on the Upper West Side.

From 1972 to 1993, the television broadcast was produced and directed by Dick Schneider; from 1994 to 2023, it was executive produced by Brad Lachman (who also produced NBC's Macy's 4th of July Fireworks Spectacular, Christmas in Rockefeller Center and Paley Center specials, among numerous other music, reality and clip compilation television programs) and produced by Bill Bracken (who continued as senior producer after longtime collaborator Lachman's retirement). Silent House Group (a Burbank-based production firm founded by Baz Halpin, who executive produced the telecast with fellow company executives Mark Bracco and Linda Gierahn) assumed production responsibilities from Lachman for the 2024 telecast. Gary Halvorson (whose directorial work has centered primarily on sitcoms as well as selected television specials) directed the telecast from 1994 to 2014 (except for 1995, when Arthur Forrest directed that year's broadcast), succeeded by Ron de Moraes from 2015 to 2022 (excluding 2017, when Ryan Polito handled directorial duties), and Joe DeMaio since 2023. Announcements during the telecast—duties which have primarily been performed by NBC staff announcers—were first provided by Bill McCord (from 1953–64, excluding the 1959 telecast), then followed in succession by Bill Wendell (1959, 1965–86), Lynda Lopez (1987–93, the telecast's only female announcer), longtime Saturday Night Live announcer Don Pardo (1994–99), and Late Night with Conan O'Brien announcer Joel Godard (2000–10). Veteran voiceover artist Les Marshak (who has served as the main announcer of Today since 2006, and was Macy's primary commercial voice from 1986 to 2006) has been the parade's announcer since the 2011 telecast. Milton DeLugg served as the telecast's music director until 2013.

Although the Macy's Thanksgiving Day Parade airs on nearly all of NBC's stations, it has often been preempted in the Detroit market due to WDIV-TV's coverage of the locally based America's Thanksgiving Parade, which the station has aired from 1964 to 1984 and, following a nine-year run on ABC affiliate WXYZ-TV, since 1995. While WDIV did carry the later tape-delayed broadcast from 2009 to 2019, local carriage of the live Macy's parade broadcast has been mostly sporadic (it aired locally on WADL from 2009 to 2016), even after the station began over-the-air digital telecasts, granting it the ability to televise the NBC telecast on a subchannel; as such, Peacock exclusively airs the parade live to Detroit-area viewers, who can also turn to nearby NBC affiliates out of Flint (WEYI), Lansing (WILX) and Toledo (WNWO).

This has similarly affected the Grand Rapids–Kalamazoo–Battle Creek, Traverse City–Cadillac–Sault Ste. Marie and Marquette markets, where WOOD-TV, WPBN/WTOM and WLUC-TV, respectively, also carry America's Thanksgiving Parade. In all three markets, the Macy's parade was only available through CBS until 2023 (see below) via WWMT, WWTV/WWUP and WJMN-TV respectively (with WZMQ replacing the latter for the 2022 edition), although the NBC stations in those markets aired tape-delayed coverage from 2009 to 2019. Since 2024, MyNetworkTV affiliate WXSP-CD has exclusively aired the parade in West Michigan, although in portions of the market where that station's low-power signal is unreachable over-the-air and thus can only be viewed on cable or satellite, viewers can also turn to nearby NBC affiliates in Lansing and South Bend (WNDU). In Northern Michigan and the Upper Peninsula as well as the northernmost portion of West Michigan, the parade is available through Peacock, although some Northern Michigan viewers may view it on WBKB-DT3 in Alpena.

Since 2003, the parade has been broadcast in Spanish on NBC sister network Telemundo; María Celeste Arrarás, anchor of the network's tabloid newsmagazine Al Rojo Vivo, hosted the Spanish simulcast of the parade from 2003 to 2006. Since 2021, the Telemundo simulcast has been hosted primarily by Carlos Adyan (co-host of daytime entertainment/lifestyle talk show En Casa con Telemundo); Adyan was joined by former Miss Universe Andrea Meza as co-host starting with the 2022 edition. The parade has won nine Emmy Awards for outstanding achievements in special event coverage since 1979. Since 2020, the parade also provided audio description via a second audio program channel.

From 2016 to 2019, Verizon produced a 360-degree virtual reality live telecast of the parade, with minimal commentary, made available through YouTube. The 2019 edition, produced in cooperation with NBC, had more extensive production, adding hosts Terry Crews, Lilly Singh and Ross Mathews, also adding "virtual balloons" generated through viewers' votes. Verizon's simulcast of the 2020 event ran in a traditional flat, single-perspective format, and was the first to be broadcast internationally, not just in the United States, through Verizon's and Macy's YouTube and Twitter handles. Verizon did not simulcast the 2021 event in either format.

The first live international broadcast of the parade occurred in 2020, when Philippine cable television channel TAP TV became the first foreign-based broadcaster to air the parade's live telecast. Before that, the broadcasts were delayed and aired on Black Friday on what is now RPTV until 2013. In addition, a delayed telecast of the parade is fed to United States military installations overseas through the American Forces Network hours after the original domestic broadcast.

==== Current hosts ====
- Savannah Guthrie (2012–present)
- Hoda Kotb (2018–present)
- Al Roker (1995–2021, 2023–present)

==== Former hosts ====
- Merrill Mueller (1953)
- Dave Garroway (1953)
- Arlene Francis (1954)
- Hugh Downs (1954)
- Buffalo Bob Smith (1955, 1960)
- Ernie Kovacs (1956)
- David Brinkley (1957)
- Bert Parks (1957–1958)
- Frank Blair (1958)
- Bill Wendell (1959)
- Gene Rayburn (1959)
- Paul Tripp (1960)
- Ed Herlihy (1961)
- Lindsey Nelson (1961)
- Bud Palmer (1962)
- Chris Schenkel (1962)
- Betty White (1963–1972)
- Lorne Greene (1963–1972)
- Martin Milner (1973)
- Kent McCord (1973)
- Ed McMahon (1974–1981)
- David Hartman (1974)
- Karen Grassle (1974)
- Helen Reddy (1975)
- Peter Marshall (1975)
- Della Reese (1976)
- McLean Stevenson (1976)
- Bryant Gumbel (1977–1980, 1982–1984)
- Regis Philbin (1981)
- Sarah Purcell (1982–1983)
- Pat Sajak (1984–1986)
- Stepfanie Kramer (1984, 1986)
- Bert Convy (1985)
- Phylicia Ayers-Allen (1985)
- Willard Scott (1987–1997)
- Mary Hart (1987)
- Sandy Duncan (1988)
- Deborah Norville (1989–1990)
- Katie Couric (1991–2005)
- Matt Lauer (1998–2017)
- Meredith Vieira (2006–2010)
- Ann Curry (2011)
- Dylan Dreyer (2022)

=== Unofficial broadcasts ===
Although the parade committee can endorse an official broadcaster, the parade takes place on public streets, and therefore Macy's can only limit exclusivity of coverage of the event to directly within the area in front of the Herald Square store, and cannot restrict coverage through exclusive rights like sporting and other events that occur inside restricted-access venues.

CBS (which has a studio in Times Square) carried unofficial coverage as The Thanksgiving Day Parade on CBS. The rerouting of the parade starting from 2012 (see below) moved the parade out of the view of CBS's cameras and thus made it significantly more difficult for the network to cover the parade. However, the route now passes along the west side of the network's Black Rock headquarters building along Sixth Avenue (with the hosts stationed on a temporary tower platform at the Sixth/W. 53rd Street corner of the building), and CBS nevertheless continued to cover the parade as before.

CBS's unofficial coverage aired live in most time zones, allowing viewers to see the parade as much as two hours before the official NBC coverage aired in their area before Peacock nulled this advantage; until 2023, CBS broadcast the parade on delay on the West Coast, immediately after the Detroit Lions Thanksgiving game in the years when CBS would carry the Lions' traditional Thanksgiving game or at 9:00 a.m. local time in the years when they carried the Dallas Cowboys Thanksgiving game.

CBS's coverage was originally part of the All-American Thanksgiving Day Parade, a broadcast that included footage from multiple parades across North America, including parades at Detroit, Philadelphia and Disneyland (the latter was later replaced by Opryland USA in 1997 and after that Miami Beach), and taped footage of the Toronto Santa Claus Parade (taped usually the second or third weekend of November) and the Aloha Floral Parade in Honolulu (which usually occurred in September). Beginning in 2004, however, CBS focused exclusively on the Macy's parade, but avoids using the Macy's name due to the lack of an official license. To compensate for the fact that the Broadway and music performances can only appear on NBC, CBS adds their own pre-recorded performances (also including Broadway shows, although different from the ones that are part of the official parade and recorded off-site) to fill out the special. With the absence of a live parade (outside of Herald Square) for 2020, CBS aired The CBS Thanksgiving Day Celebration, which was hosted by Kevin Frazier and Keltie Knight of Entertainment Tonight, and featured highlights and new performances.

For the 1997 parade, MTV guest reporters, Beavis and Butt-head, with host Kurt Loder, provided their usual style of commentary on aspects of the parade, and of their take on Thanksgiving in general. The special, titled Beavis and Butt-head Do Thanksgiving, included a balloon of Beavis and Butt-head spectating from their couch. The balloon was not participating in the parade, but stationed on top of a building alongside the parade route.

CBS discontinued its parade coverage following the 2023 edition of the Thanksgiving Day Parade on CBS broadcast, part of a broader cutback of the network's special holiday programming by parent company Paramount Global ahead of its then-pending merger with Skydance Media (predecessor of the network's current corporate parent, Skydance Corporation).

Radio coverage of the parade is provided by Audacy's WINS (1010 AM) in New York City, which CBS owned from 1995 until 2017, when then-parent CBS Corporation sold off its radio division to Audacy; it is one of the few times throughout the year in which WINS breaks away from its all-news radio format. Livestreams of the parade by persons situated along its route have been commonplace since smartphones and online video platforms came into prominence during the 2010s.

== Parade route ==
The Macy's parade has always been held in Manhattan. The parade originally started from 145th Street in Harlem and ended at Macy's flagship in Herald Square (at the intersection of Broadway, Sixth Avenue, and 34th Street), making a 6-mile (9.7 km) route.

In the 1930s, the balloons were inflated around 110th Street and Amsterdam Avenue, near the Cathedral of St. John the Divine. The parade proceeded south on Amsterdam Avenue to 106th Street and turned east. At Columbus Avenue, the balloons had to be lowered to go under the Ninth Avenue El. Past the El tracks, the parade proceeded east on 106th Street to Central Park West and turned south to terminate at Macy's flagship.

A new route was established for the 2009 parade. From 77th Street and Central Park West, the route went south along Central Park to Columbus Circle, then east along Central Park South. The parade would then make a right turn at 7th Avenue and go south to Times Square. At 42nd Street, the parade turned left and went east, then at 6th Avenue turned right again at Bryant Park. Heading south on 6th Avenue, the parade turned right at 34th Street (at Herald Square) and proceeded west to the terminating point at 7th Avenue where the floats are dismantled. The 2009 route change eliminated Broadway completely, where the parade has traveled down for decades. The City of New York said that the new route would provide more space for the parade, and more viewing space for spectators. Another reason for implementing the route change is the city's subsequent transformation of Broadway into a pedestrian-only zone at Times Square.

Another new route was introduced with the 2012 parade. This change is similar to the 2009 route, but eliminated Times Square altogether, instead going east from Columbus Circle along Central Park South, then south on Sixth Avenue to Herald Square.

Balloon teams race through Columbus Circle due to higher winds in this flat area, making it a less desirable observation site. New York City officials preview the parade route and try to eliminate as many potential obstacles as possible, including rotating overhead traffic signals out of the way. Viewing is restricted from 38th Street through the end of the parade route, as this area is used for the NBC telecast.

== Similar parades ==
Other American cities also have parades held on Thanksgiving, none of which are run by Macy's. The nation's oldest Thanksgiving parade (the Gimbels parade, which has had many sponsors over the years, and is now known as the 6abc Dunkin' Thanksgiving Day Parade) was first held in Philadelphia in 1920. Other cities with parades on the holiday include the McDonald's Thanksgiving Parade in Chicago, Illinois and parades in Plymouth, Massachusetts; Seattle, Washington; Houston, Texas; Detroit, Michigan; and Fountain Hills, Arizona. There is also a second Thanksgiving balloon parade within the New York metropolitan area, the UBS balloon parade in Stamford, Connecticut, located 30 miles (48 km) away; that parade is held the Sunday before Thanksgiving, so as not to compete with the parade in New York City. It usually does not duplicate any balloon characters. The Celebrate the Season Parade, held the last Saturday in November in Pittsburgh, was sponsored by Macy's from 2006 to 2013 after Macy's acquired the Kaufmann's store chain that had sponsored that parade prior to 2006.

=== Universal's Holiday Parade Featuring Macy's ===
Since 2002, Macy's Studios has partnered with the Universal Orlando Resort (owned by NBC parent NBCUniversal) to bring balloons and floats from New York City to the theme park in Florida every holiday season in an event known as the Macy's Holiday Parade. The parade is performed daily and includes the Santa Claus float used in New York's parade. Performers from the Orlando area are cast as various clowns, and the park used to invite guests to be "balloon handlers" for the parade. In 2017, the Macy's Holiday Parade was renamed to Universal's Holiday Parade Featuring Macy's. In 2020, as a result of the ongoing COVID-19 pandemic, the parade could not be run. Instead, a walkthrough experience known as Universal's Holiday Experience Featuring Macy's Balloons took place throughout the holiday season, displaying various floats and balloons that would normally be seen in the parade.

== In popular culture ==
- The 1947 film Miracle on 34th Street, begins with the parade, as do most of its remakes. The film portrays the real Santa Claus being hired to work at Macy's after its own Santa impersonator gets drunk during the parade. NBC, in its telecasts, often showed the original 1947 film on Thanksgiving afternoon, following its coverage of the parade and the National Dog Show, until 2008.
- The 1984 film Broadway Danny Rose features a sequence in which Danny (Woody Allen) and Tina (Mia Farrow) are chased into a warehouse containing Parade materials and helium gas supplies; near the end of the film Tina is at the Macy's Thanksgiving Parade itself.
- The parade is featured in the 1987 children's book We're Back! A Dinosaur's Story and its animated film adaptation where Rex mistakenly befriends a dinosaur balloon.
- In the 1994 Seinfeld episode "The Mom and Pop Store", Elaine wins a spot on the parade route for her boss, Mr. Pitt, to hold the Woody Woodpecker balloon.
- In 1994 the first Thanksgiving-themed episode of Friends, "The One Where Underdog Gets Away", centered on the accidental release of the (unused at the time) "Underdog" balloon.
- In the 2000 Green Day album Warning, track 12 is titled 'Macy's Day Parade'.
- In 2008, a Coca-Cola CGI ad aired in the United States during Super Bowl XLII. The commercial's plot centered around Underdog and fictional Stewie Griffin balloons chasing a Coke bottle-shaped balloon through New York City. The spot ended with a Charlie Brown balloon holding the Coke balloon. The advertisement won a Silver Lion Award at the annual Lions International Advertising Festival in Cannes, France, that year, and the clip of the commercial with the Griffin balloon was featured in a Macy's commercial in October 2008 (along with clips from Miracle on 34th Street, I Love Lucy, Seinfeld and other media where Macy's was mentioned). The commercial was also referenced in a 2011 episode of Family Guy. Stewie, one of its main characters, is seen watching the parade only to see the balloon of himself in the parade.
- In the 2011 film Tower Heist, the climax of the film takes place during the parade, using b-roll from the 2010 parade as well as a partial recreation of its opening, which was filmed a week later.
- In the 2016 Ghostbusters film, the Ghostbusters fight a haunted balloon parade including several Macy's balloons from the 1920s, 1930s and 1940s.

== See also ==
- Santa Claus parades
- List of Christmas and holiday season parades
- 1997 Macy's Thanksgiving Day Parade
- Adelaide Christmas Pageant
- Toronto Santa Claus Parade
- 6abc Dunkin' Thanksgiving Day Parade
- America's Thanksgiving Parade
