= Anti-Barney humor =

Humor that targets Barney the Dinosaur

The cover of a roleplaying guidebook The Jihad to Destroy Barney (1999) depicts anti-Barney humor in the 1990s and early 2000s.

Anti-Barney humor is a form of humor that targets Barney the Dinosaur, the main character from the children's television series Barney & Friends, and singles out the show for criticism.

In University of Chicago professor W. J. T. Mitchell's book The Last Dinosaur Book: The Life and Times of a Cultural Icon, he notes that the program is often a target for parody and negative attacks by older children, adolescents, and adults in the United States and elsewhere; the notion given that the show is "saccharine", "boring", "annoying", "sugary", "dangerous" or "uneducational". Other popular preschool children's shows and characters have been subject to subversive adult humor; but in Barney's case, the humor has typically been far more dark, and in a more vicious and hostile nature toward the character of Barney himself.

== History ==
Barney & Friends first aired in 1992, gaining immense popularity among younger viewers under the age of five. However, the show also garnered disapproval by most older children, teenagers and young adults, who criticised it for being "saccharine", "sunshine-and-rainbows", and "one-dimensional". University of Chicago professor W. J. T. Mitchell noted that:

"Barney is on the receiving end of more hostility than just about any other popular cultural icon I can think of. Parents admit to a cordial dislike of the saccharine saurian, and no self-respecting second-grader will admit to liking Barney."

These children were among the first to practice anti-Barney humor, and an entire chapter of the 1995 book Greasy Grimy Gopher Guts: The Subversive Folklore of Childhood was dedicated to them.

Eventually, adults began to contribute to the anti-Barney humor, including some parents and celebrities. Many families eventually refused to watch the show because of its supposed "one-dimensionality" and "lack of educational value", and several YouTube videos have plush dolls and figurines of the character being destroyed in various ways, including being burnt, blown up by small explosive devices, being shot by weapons using tannerite or being run over by vehicles.

Reasons cited for the hostility also include Barney's voice (described by many parents as "dopey"), lack of varied facial expressions aside from a toothy smile, and personality (described as being "self-centered"), as well as how the children in the series interact with the dinosaur characters.

In Barney vs. The San Diego Chicken, Ted Giannoulas stated

[...] "Perhaps the most insightful criticism regarding Barney is that his shows do not assist children in learning to deal with negative feelings and emotions. As one commentator puts it, the real danger from Barney is denial: the refusal to recognize the existence of unpleasant realities. For along with his steady diet of giggles and unconditional love, Barney offers our children a one-dimensional world where everyone must be happy and everything must be resolved right away."

Additionally, the show was ranked number 50 on TV Guide's List of the 50 Worst TV Shows of All Time, the only public television series to make the list.

== Examples ==
=== Barkley vs. Barney ===
Former NBA player and Hall of Famer Charles Barkley was the guest host of Saturday Night Live on September 25, 1993, and performed a skit that parodied his Godzilla-themed Nike commercial by facing off against Barney in a one-on-one matchup.

=== The Barney Fun Page ===
The Barney Fun Page is an early website that allows users to attack a crude drawing of Barney with icons representing a knife, gun, and other weapons. Hosted originally on a University of Alberta computer system, the website was created in 1994. It is among the oldest websites in the world still operating as of 2026.

=== "Baloney and Kids" ===
The animated series Animaniacs produced a satirical episode in which the Warner siblings confront "Baloney", an orange dinosaur meant to be a parody of Barney. The entire episode is dedicated to lampooning the series, as well as PBS for airing it (the introduction promotes the show as part of the "SBS (Stupid Broadcasting Service)" while the voice-over says, "Baloney and Kids is brought to you by this station and other stations that lack clever programming."). The Warners try various methods to get rid of Baloney (including dropping anvils on his head; after the second time Baloney says, "Let's do that again!"), but only escape when the show runs out of time, at which point they also take with them three extremely desperate adult members of the regular crew (including Hello Nurse).

=== "Georgie Must Die" ===
The sitcom Dinosaurs similarly produced a satirical episode, featuring "Georgie", another Barney parody that is an orange hippo, who is idolized by Baby Sinclair, much to the irritation of his siblings and his father, Earl Sinclair. However, Earl later learns that Georgie is really a tax-evading, money-grabbing fraud and, with the help of his best friend and co-worker Roy and the Parents Resistance, ultimately exposes him on TV, leading to his arrest at the end of the episode.

=== "Humphrey the Hippo" ===
The animated sitcom The Critic did a few parodies of Barney. Kath Soucie provided the voice for the parody of the dinosaur named "Humphrey". He appeared in the episode "A Little Deb Will Do Ya" where Jay starts a relationship with Humphrey's actor. Barney himself was spoofed in movie form in the episode "A Pig Boy and His Dog" where Jay reviews "Barney the Dinosaur: The Motion Picture" where the title character is voiced by Marlon Brando.

=== "Murder" at Macy's Thanksgiving Day parade ===
Home video of deflation
- "Thanksgiving '97. The day Barney was killed"

High winds at the 1997 Macy's Thanksgiving Day Parade caused a balloon replica of Barney to sway out of control into a street light that stabbed a gaping hole into the balloon, which led New York City Police Department officers to tackle the balloon and deflate it with knives and boots; children who witnessed the balloon's destruction cheered on Barney's “death”. A video of the incident, uploaded to YouTube in 2013 under the title "Thanksgiving '97. The day Barney was killed", proved popular both there and on TikTok. Danny Gallagher of the Dallas Observer associates its popularity with the phenomenon of Barney hatred. Many commentators humorously characterize the incident as Barney the character having been murdered.

=== Music and related video ===
One of the first well-known anti-Barney songs was Tony Mason's "Barney's on Fire." The song is often misattributed to "Weird Al" Yankovic, who denied writing it; he did, however, release a music video of his own song "Jurassic Park" depicting Barney's decapitation by a Tyrannosaurus Rex.

On Top of da World, the 1999 debut album by California gangsta rapper Lil Italy, includes a brief skit entitled "Fuck Barney", whose narrator, depicted as a young child, describes the dinosaur as a "fat purple bitch".

An online video created by Ryan Steinhardt in 1998 combines clips from Barney and Friends with the 2Pac single "Hit 'Em Up", designed to give the viewer the impression that Barney and the other characters from the show are rapping. The humor is based on the juxtaposition of the actual song's heavy use of profanity and violent content, as opposed to the regular lessons and content on Barney and Friends.

The animated TV series Garfield and Friends parodied Barney in the episode "The Beast from Beyond".

=== Print media ===
The Mad magazine fold-in for issue #328 asked, "What Single Goal Has Brought Agreement And Unity Among Vastly Different Groups?" and the image, which featured pairs of opposite people proclaiming their support for the answer, folded into a dead Barney with the word "extinct" on it, and the caption then read "Death to Barney".

In May 1994, Michael Viner published a book called Final Exit For Barney. It consists of different ways to kill the character, mostly with crude humor.

The science humor magazine Annals of Improbable Research published, in its 1995 January and February issue, a taxonomical article entitled The Taxonomy of Barney that included X-rays of the character's skeleton.

==== Barney and the number of the beast ====
One of the most widely distributed works of anti-Barney humor appeared in the 2001 book Science Askew, which determined through numerological calculation that a phrase describing Barney contained a chronogram of the Book of Revelation's number of the beast, 666. Below is the formula of the equation:

1. The character of Barney is well-described as a "cute purple dinosaur".
2. The book points out how the former Latin alphabet used the letter V in place of U.
3. Therefore the above phrase is modified to "cvte pvrple dinosavr".
4. Letters that do not represent Roman numerals are removed, leaving: "c v v l d i v"
5. When the remaining numbers 100, 5, 5, 50, 500, 1, and 5 are added, the result is 666, the Number of the Beast.

=== Film ===
The closing scene of the 1998 film Mafia! depicts an assassin, Nick "The Eskimo" Molinaro, fatally stabbing a purple Barney-like dinosaur (who is seen eagerly watching pornography in his apartment) with a harpoon. The closing credits note that a shrine was built in Molinaro's honor, visited by millions of grateful parents for doing "the one deed to benefit all mankind."

Buddy is a 2026 comedy horror film whose main character, Buddy, is a parody of Barney, presented as a brightly-colored cheerful oversized mascot of a children's program from the 1990s.

=== Internet fiction ===
One rumor proposed that Barney was based on a 1930s serial killer. The rumor was confirmed as false by Snopes. Another false rumor claimed that Barney had cocaine hidden in his tail and would frequently use profanity with the child actors on the show.

=== Jihad ===
The Jihad to Destroy Barney is a fictional jihad that sees itself in the ultimate battle against Barney, who is portrayed as "Demon Lord B'harne", and his followers. It is described as "a heterogeneous organization of people on the Internet dedicated to defamation, humiliation, eradication, killing, and removal of Barney the Purple Dinosaur of the television show Barney & Friends from the airwaves and from every human's life." B'harne is depicted as a purple, scaly lizard-like demon with sharp talons, long teeth and glowing evil red eyes.

References to a Barney "Jihad" were found on Barney-related Usenet newsgroups as early as 1993. The website itself was active as of 1995. Furthermore, Douglass Streusand, a professor of Islamic history at Marine Corps Staff College in Virginia, discovered that the first entry of an Internet search on the term "jihad" referred to Barney.

=== Martin Pistorius ===
Martin Pistorius is a South African man who had locked-in syndrome and was unable to move or communicate for 12 years. He partially credits his antagonistic thoughts towards Barney & Friends (which was played as re-runs where he was staying) as helping him recover from his vegetative state. His hatred of the show made him try to think about things that gave him some control over his external reality, such as telling the time by tracking sunlight in a room.

== Video games ==
- The game Wolfenstein 3D by id Software was modded to replace boss characters with Barney. Because these changes were destructive (the original source code had to be replaced for the mod to take effect), the developers separated media data from the main program when developing Doom. These were known as WADs, for "Where's All the Data". They were modded to feature Barney as one of the enemy targets.
- The video game Xenophage: Alien Bloodsport by 3D Realms (then known as Apogee Software) features a hidden playable character named "Blarney", who is a clear parody of Barney. The character is unlocked by toggling certain game settings. In-game, Blarney's moveset includes the ability to launch bloody "hearts" at opponents; should the player character lose a battle to Blarney, the game will mock the player with the superimposed text "PATHETIC!" read aloud by the game's announcer.
- A computer game was released for Macintosh entitled Barney Carnage.
- One of the bosses in Monster Madness: Battle for Suburbia is a monstrous Barney parody named Mr. Huggles, who attacks by singing and attempting to hug unwilling pedestrians. After fighting him, his suit comes off, revealing a more vicious Jabba the Hutt-like being named Jaba the Huggle.
- In the fighting game M.U.G.E.N, several fan-made characters of Barney exist, and are made to be deliberately weak so players can watch other characters, such as Godzilla, fight and defeat him effortlessly.
- Austin Seraphin wrote a popular door game for bulletin board systems in 1993 titled Barneysplat, where the player tries to sabotage production of the Barney & Friends television program by doing things such as spiking the tea at Barney's tea party or offering beer to the children.
- John Dondzila wrote a homebrew game for the ColecoVision in 1996 which involved killing Barney. Called Purple Dinosaur Massacre, it was originally written for gaining sprite programming experience on the ColecoVision, but was released to the web via ClassicGaming.com in 1997 and gained some popularity among the readers of the website.
- Killing Barney was a common premise for fan-made ZZT games.
- A "Barney Blaster" module for the After Dark screensaver allowed users to repeatedly destroy Barney with fire, explosions and a machine gun.

== Legal issues ==
Lyons Partnership, owners of the intellectual property rights to Barney & Friends, claimed that some Barney spoofs that employed photos of the character or parody sound files represented trademark and copyright infringement. Lyons' lawyers subsequently demanded that such material be removed from the Internet. Some site owners complied after such threats.

=== Barney vs. The San Diego Chicken ===
In 1994, comedy sketches of The San Diego Chicken during professional sporting events began to include scenes of the Chicken beating up a dinosaur character. Lyons Partnership began sending letters to Ted Giannoulas, who portrays the Chicken, demanding that he stop the alleged violation of Lyons' rights on the Barney character.

These threats did not stop the mock battles between the Chicken and Barney. On October 8, 1997, Lyons filed a lawsuit in Fort Worth, Texas federal district court against Giannoulas, claiming copyright and trademark infringement and further claiming that such performances would confuse children. In his case, Giannoulas cited that the purple dino was a "symbol of what is wrong with our society--a homage, if you will, to all the inane, banal platitudes that we readily accept and thrust unthinkingly upon our children", that his qualities are "insipid and corny", and that he also explains that, in an article posted in a 1997 issue of The New Yorker, he argues that at least some perceive Barney as a "pot-bellied," "sloppily fat" dinosaur who "giggle[s] compulsively in a tone of unequaled feeble-mindedness" and "jiggles his lumpish body like an overripe eggplant." This court agreed with Giannoulas, and ruled against Lyons on July 29, 1998, declaring the sketches to be a parody that did not infringe on the rights of the character that Lyons created.

Lyons appealed this ruling to the Fifth Circuit Court of Appeals, but again lost their case to Giannoulas on July 7, 1999.

=== Barney vs. EFF ===
The Electronic Frontier Foundation hosted online archives from the Computer Underground Digest that contained Barney parody material. In 2001, Gibney, Anthony & Flaherty, LLP, lawyers for Lyons Partnership, issued a threat letter to EFF claiming infringement of the Barney character. EFF strongly defended itself against these claims citing the established defence of parody, backed by United States First Amendment protections.

As of 29 November 2006, the EFF successfully defended an anti-Barney website from a lawsuit. An article in British publication The Register applauded the victory.

=== Barney vs. CyberCheeze ===
Around 2001, Olympia, Washington-based comedy website CyberCheeze posted a work entitled "150 Ways to Kill the Purple Dinosaur". Lyons threatened legal action in response, and CyberCheeze replied on their site that the threat was "about as intellectual as the purple quivering mass of gyrating goo you call Barney, but that it also is demeaning to everyone that visits our website and reads this worthless attempt and scare tactic."

== Documentary ==
A miniseries about the hatred of Barney called I Love You, You Hate Me was released on Peacock on October 12, 2022.

== See also ==
- Anti-bronies
- Buddy
- Death to Smoochy
- Mr Blobby, an oft-derided British character from the same time frame
- Evil Elmo
