= 2006 New York City Cirrus SR20 crash =

Aircraft crash into a building

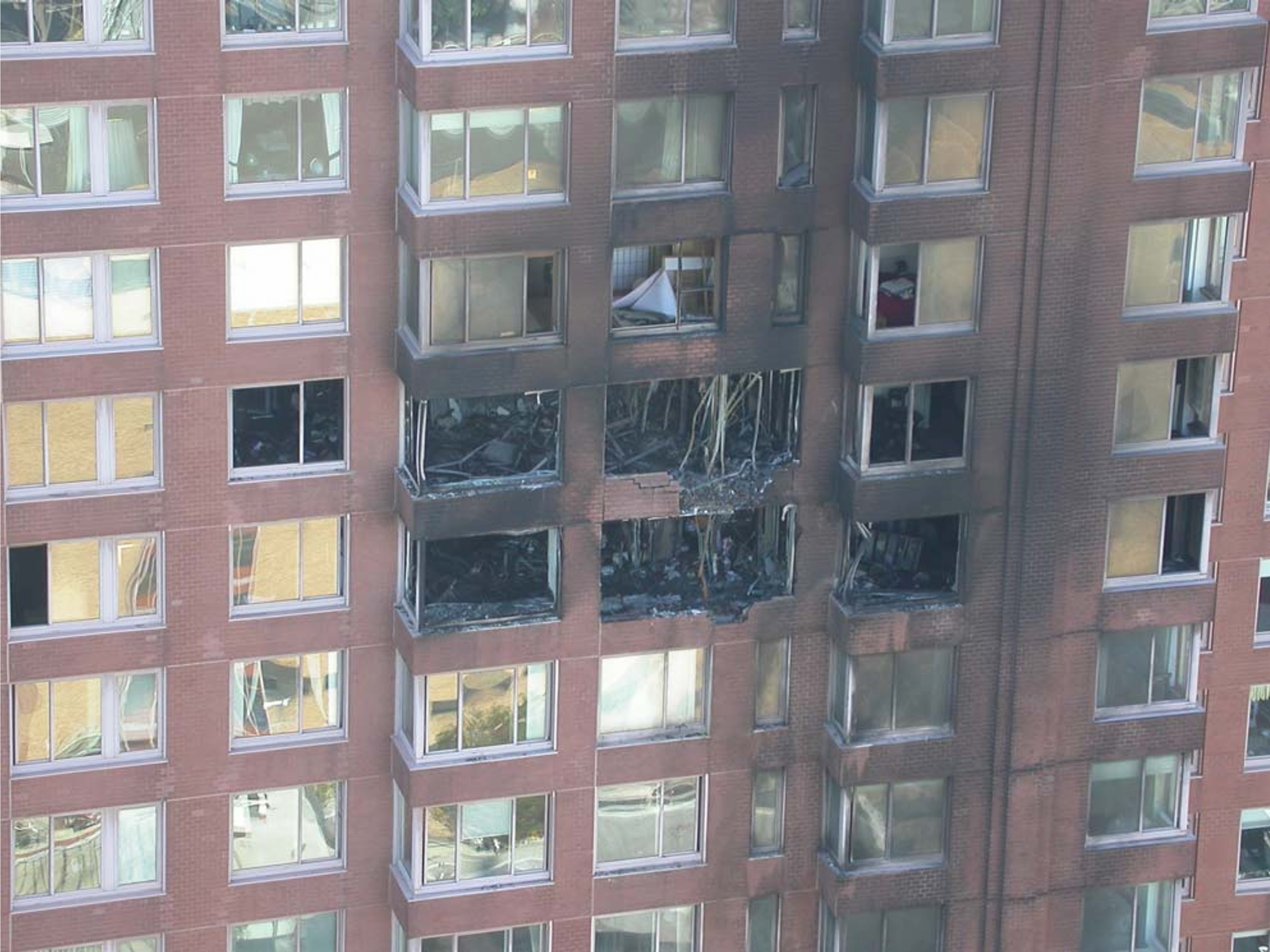
- The impact site of the aircraft in the Belaire Apartments

Accident
- Date: October 11, 2006; 20 years ago
- Summary: Controlled flight into building
- Site: Belaire Apartments, Manhattan, New York City, US; 40.76616°N 73.95221°W
- Total fatalities: 2
- Total injuries: 21

Aircraft
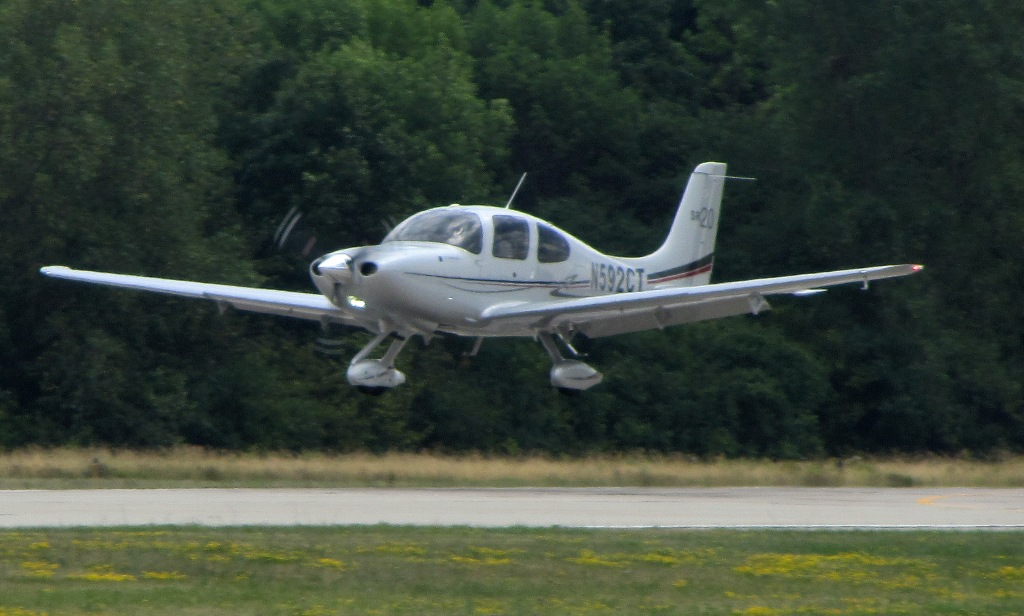
- A Cirrus SR20 similar to the aircraft involved in the incident
- Aircraft type: Cirrus SR20
- Operator: Private
- Registration: N929CD
- Flight origin: Teterboro Airport; Teterboro, New Jersey, US
- Occupants: 2
- Fatalities: 2
- Survivors: 0

Ground casualties
- Ground fatalities: 0
- Ground injuries: 21 (including 11 firefighters)

On October 11, 2006, a Cirrus SR20 aircraft crashed into the Belaire Apartments on the Upper East Side of Manhattan, New York City, United States, at about 2:42 p.m. EDT (18:42 UTC). The aircraft struck the north side of the building, causing a fire in several apartments that was extinguished within two hours.

Both people aboard the aircraft were killed in the accident: New York Yankees pitcher Cory Lidle and his certificated flight instructor Tyler Stanger. Twenty-one people were injured, including eleven firefighters. An apartment resident, Ilana Benhuri, who lived in the building with her husband, was hospitalized for a month with severe burns incurred when the post-impact fire engulfed her apartment.

The Cirrus SR20 aircraft, tail number N929CD, was owned by Lidle. On May 1, 2007, the National Transportation Safety Board (NTSB) stated that the probable cause of the crash was pilot error. The NTSB was unable to determine which person was flying the aircraft at the time of the crash.

== Flight ==
The aircraft departed from Teterboro Airport in Teterboro, New Jersey, at 2:29 pm EDT (18:29 UTC). With the Yankees' season having come to an end four days prior, Lidle planned to fly to Nashville, Tennessee, where he had a hotel room booked for the night, then to Dallas, Texas, and finally on to his home in California.

Radar measurements show that, immediately before the crash, Lidle's aircraft was flying at 112 mph (180 km/h) at 700 feet (210 m) altitude in the East River VFR corridor, an area which former NTSB official Peter Goelz described as "very tricky" due to its narrow width and frequent congestion. The VFR corridor ends abruptly at the northern tip of Roosevelt Island. Aircraft must receive an air traffic control clearance to proceed beyond the boundaries of the corridor, or else make a sharp U-turn and return the way they came. Lidle's plane flew north along the corridor almost to the end before executing a turn and hitting the north face of the building along the river.

== Crash ==
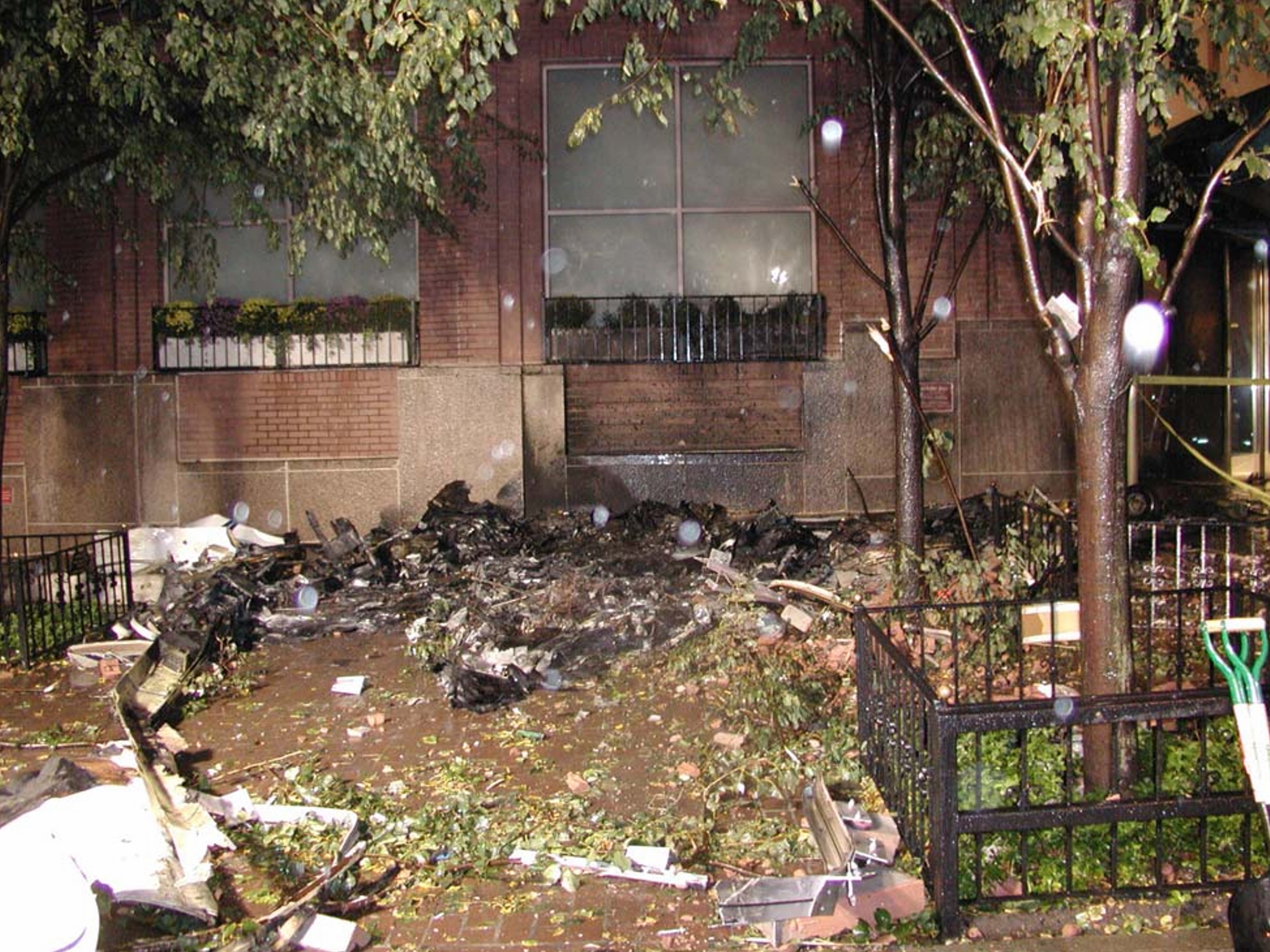
The main wreckage of the aircraft after it fell down to the sidewalk below

The airplane struck the Belaire, a 42-story condominium tower at 524 East 72nd Street, nose-first at approximately 30 stories above the ground. The plane hit the apartment owned by Dr. Parviz Benhuri and his wife Ilana, the latter of whom was seated in the room when the plane crashed and, thus, sustained fragmentation injuries and burns. Her housekeeper was also present and helped her escape. The engine landed in and set fire to the apartment of a woman who had suffered a previous freak accident—having been left comatose when a balloon at the 1997 Macy's Thanksgiving Day Parade knocked a piece of a lamppost onto her head—but the apartment was unoccupied at the time.

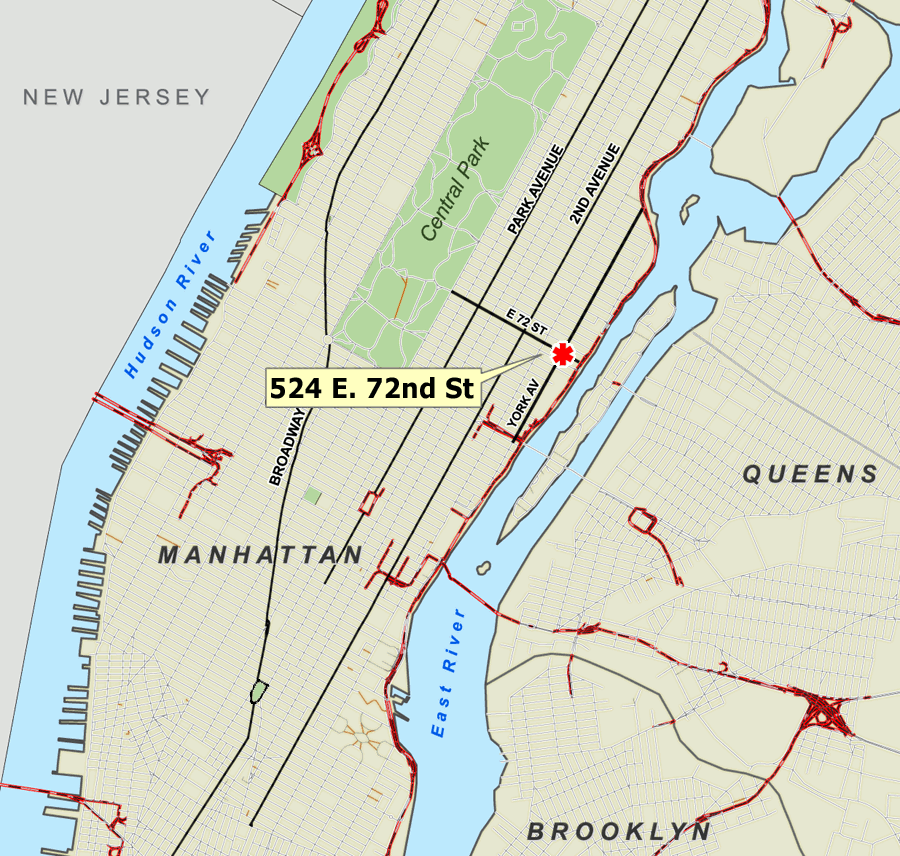
Map of the crash's location on the Upper East Side

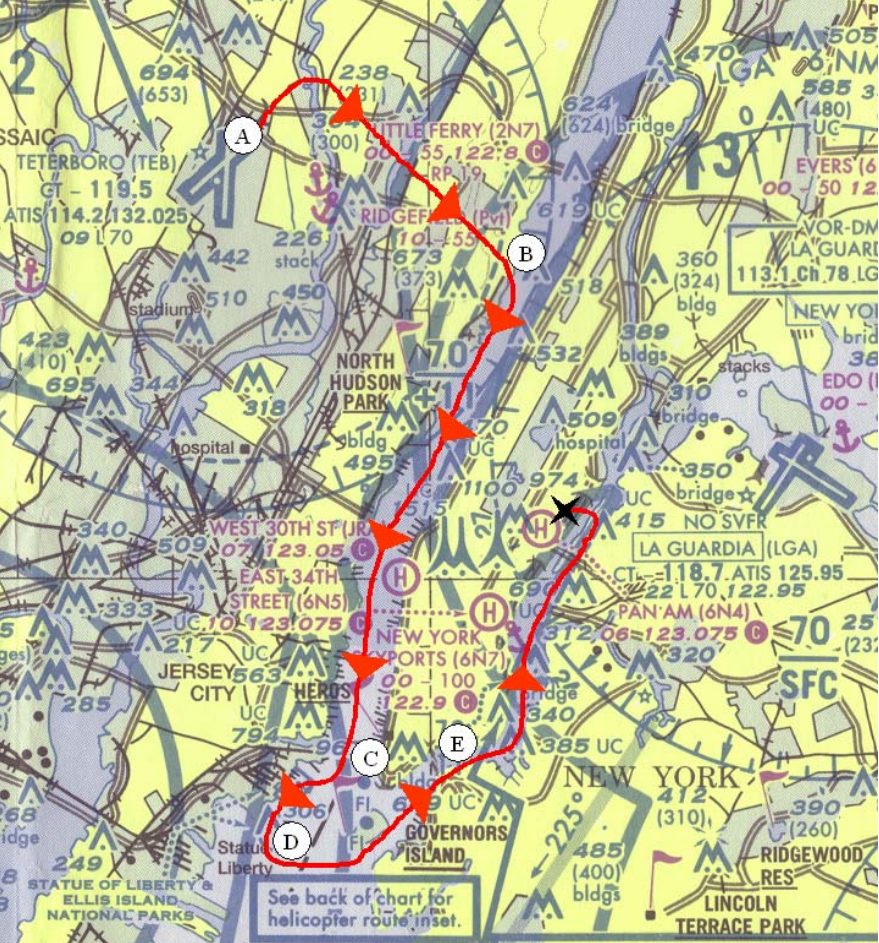
Accident flight path from the final NTSB report

The aircraft's Ballistic Recovery Systems emergency parachute, designed to bring the small plane down safely from altitudes above 500 ft, was not deployed. The plane circled the Statue of Liberty before flying north up the East River and disappeared from radar near the Queensboro Bridge. It was flying under visual flight rules (VFR) and had attracted no special attention from air traffic controllers or NORAD before the crash. The aircraft took a hard U-shaped turn before it hit the building.

== Reactions ==
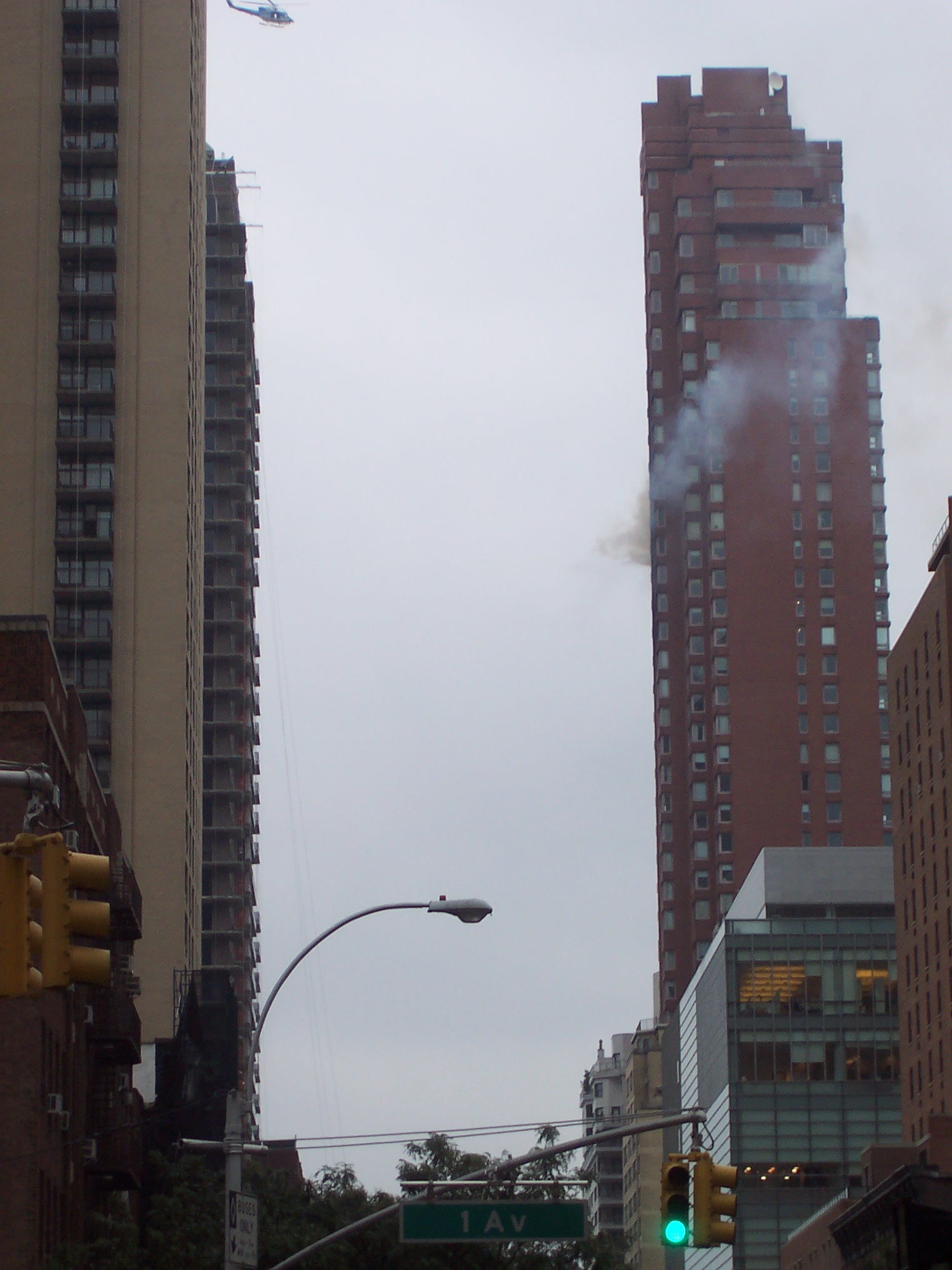
East-facing view of smoke from the building (right) shortly before the post-crash fire was extinguished

In an interview Lidle gave about a month earlier, he stated he had been a pilot for seven months and had flown about 95 solo hours. The crash garnered extra attention because of superficial similarities to the September 11 attacks in New York City, which had occurred five years earlier. U.S. officials said that NORAD scrambled fighter aircraft over numerous American and Canadian cities for combat air patrol, and that U.S. President George W. Bush was informed about the situation, but that these were precautionary measures only. The FBI quickly announced there was no reason to suspect that the crash was an act of terrorism.

LaGuardia Airport and John F. Kennedy International Airport did not experience delays from the crash. Police cordoned off several blocks at the peak of the confusion, but subway and NY Waterway ferry services continued without interruption. The FAA initially imposed a temporary flight restriction on an area within one nautical mile (1.9 km) of the scene, from ground level to 1,500 feet (460 m) altitude. New York Governor George Pataki called for permanent restrictions, although mayor Michael Bloomberg opposed a permanent restriction.

On October 13, 2006, two days after the crash, the FAA banned all fixed-winged aircraft from the East River corridor unless in contact with local air traffic control. The new rule, which took effect immediately, required all small aircraft (with the exception of helicopters and certain seaplanes) to seek the approval of and stay in contact with air traffic control while in the corridor. The FAA cited safety concerns, especially unpredictable winds from between buildings, as the reason for the change.

== Investigation ==
On October 11, the National Transportation Safety Board dispatched a six-member team from Washington, D.C. to New York City, which arrived at the scene in the evening to take fuel samples and examine clues found in the debris. These included the aircraft's bent propeller, a charred memory chip, the undeployed parachute, and Lidle's flight log book.

The NTSB determined at a final hearing on May 1, 2007, that "the pilots' inadequate planning, judgment, and airmanship in the performance of a 180-degree turn maneuver inside of a limited turning space" caused the crash. The investigation was unable to determine whether Lidle or his flight instructor Stanger was at the controls. Although there was 2,100 feet (640 m) of space available, the aircraft used only about 1,700 feet (520 m) of width to make the 180-degree turn—but this distance was effectively reduced to 1,300 feet (400 m) by the 13-knot (24 km/h) easterly winds that day. A bank angle of at least 53 degrees would be required to successfully execute a 180-degree turn in this distance. If the required bank was not initiated early then, as the turn progressed, the bank angle would have needed to have been increased, possibly resulting in an aerodynamic stall. The investigation was unable to determine if the plane stalled at the time of the crash. An animation of the flight path combining radar data with a Coast Guard video of the East River was also presented.

A 2007 lawsuit brought by Lidle's family against the manufacturer of the aircraft, Cirrus Design, alleging a mechanical defect, was rejected by a jury in May 2011.

== Dramatization ==
It is featured in season 2, episode 4, of the TV show Why Planes Crash, in an episode titled "Small Planes, Big Problem", which first aired in 2016.

== See also ==
- Box canyon (aviation) – A hazardous narrow canyon that may require a sharp turn to escape
- 1945 Empire State Building B-25 crash
- 1946 plane crash at 40 Wall Street
- 2002 Pirelli Tower airplane crash
- 2026 Beijing Sunward SA 60L Crash
- List of fires in high-rise buildings
