= Belaire Apartments =

Residential skyscraper in Manhattan, New York

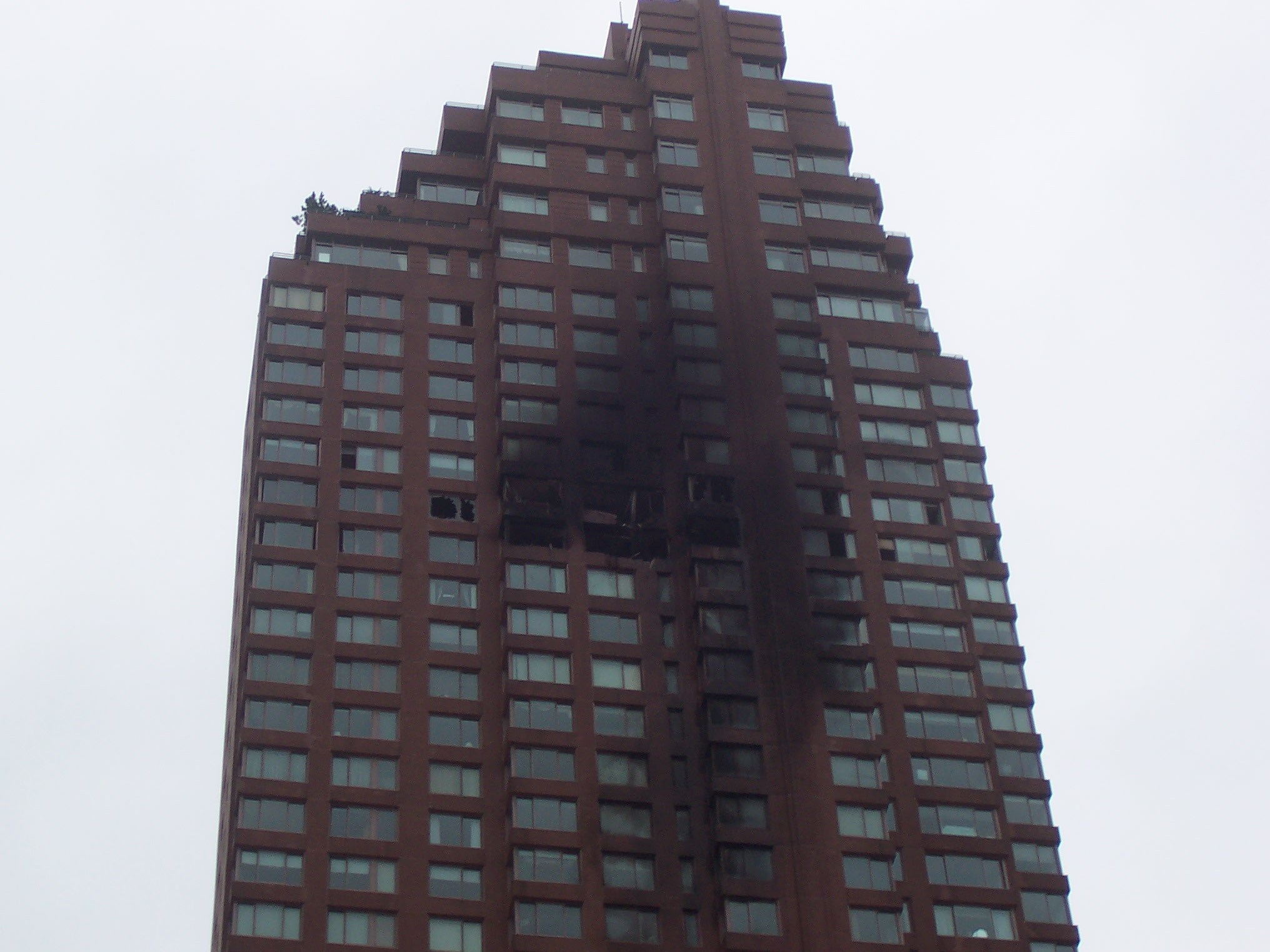
- Belaire Apartments in 2006 after a fire, caused by a plane crash, was extinguished.

General information
- Location: 524 East 72nd Street, Manhattan
- Coordinates: 40°45′57″N 73°57′08″W
- Completed: 1988
- Owner: Hospital for Special Surgery

Height
- Roof: 512 ft (156 m)

Technical details
- Floor count: 42

Design and construction
- Architect(s): Frank Williams and Associates
- Developer: Zeckendorf Company

Belaire Apartments (also known as the Belaire Condominiums and The Belaire) is a mixed-use high-rise condominium apartment building in Manhattan, New York City. The 42-story building is located at 524 East 72nd Street between York Avenue and the FDR Drive.

== Description ==
It has 183 condominium apartments, a health club, parking garage and swimming pool. The first fourteen floors are used by the Hospital for Special Surgery. The building has prominent views overlooking the East River. It is 512 feet (156 m) tall.

It was designed by Frank Williams and Associates, and features a red brick facade. The building has a reinforced concrete structure, making it one of the tallest concrete buildings at the time of its construction.

== History ==
The building was completed in 1988 and was constructed by the Zeckendorf Company, on the site previously occupied by a parking garage owned by the Hospital for Special Surgery.

After construction Belaire enjoyed reductions in its property taxes for 10 years as a result of Section 421-a tax exemption certificates, a New York City affordable housing program. This happened because another company renovated 30 apartments at the Spring Creek Gardens complex in East New York and sold the tax benefits it accrued to the Zeckendorf Company.

In October 2006 residents included novelist Carol Higgins Clark (38th floor); developer Arthur W. Zeckendorf (42nd floor); former Bloomingdale's CEO and Chairman Marvin S. Traub; once-jailed junk-bond king Ivan Boesky; Cigar Aficionado and Wine Spectator magazines publisher Marvin R. Shanken; Cleveland Guardians manager Manny Acta; and Pakistani politician (and later president) Asif Ali Zardari.

As of 2007, the Hospital for Special Surgery continued to own the land, and in exchange for selling the development rights to Zeckendorf, it received use of the lower 12 floors for offices. Originally nurses and technicians were housed there, as these individuals had a difficult time finding affordable housing in New York. Floors 13–22 were still used for housing hospital staff and guests. The Belaire also houses office and laboratory space, sports injury rehabilitation areas, and guest facilities for family members of patients at the Hospital to which it is connected via a causeway on the third floor.

=== Plane crash ===
On October 11, 2006, a four-seat, Cirrus Design SR-20 single-engine fixed-wing aircraft owned by New York Yankees pitcher Cory Lidle crashed into the apartment building. The two occupants of the plane, Lidle and his flight instructor Tyler Stanger, were both killed in the crash; one resident of the Belaire was severely injured in the resulting fire. The National Transportation Safety Board found that the likely cause of the crash was pilot error.
