= 1997 Macy's Thanksgiving Day Parade =

Event affected by high winds

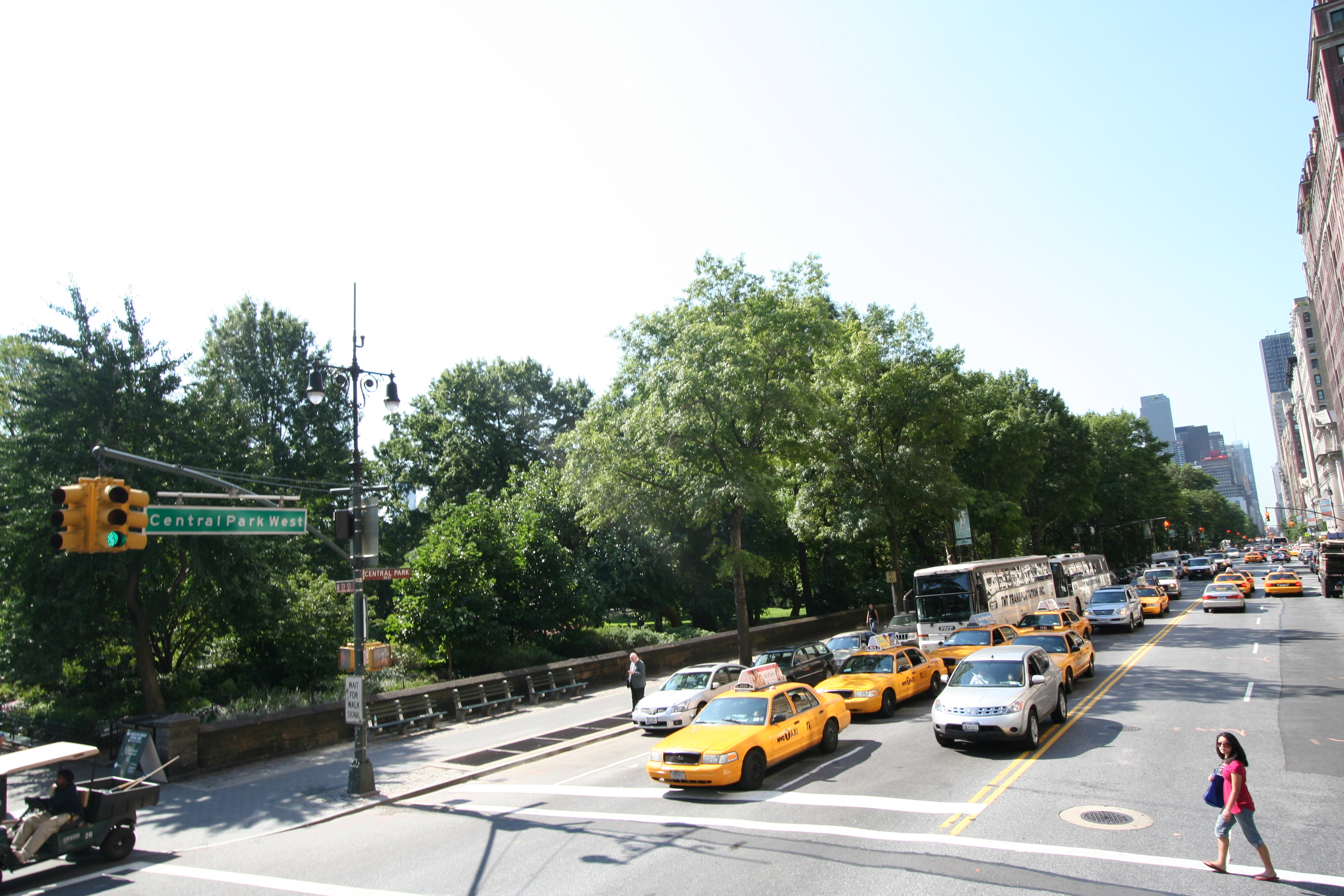
The corner of 72nd Street and Central Park West (photographed in 2008), site of the near-fatal lamppost collision

The 71st Macy's Thanksgiving Day Parade was held on November 27, 1997, under high winds, which led to multiple mishaps involving the parade's signature balloons. A Cat in the Hat balloon collided with a lamppost, knocking off its arm and sending a spectator into a month-long coma. There were at least four injuries overall, including another serious head wound from the same incident. The Cat in the Hat was one of several balloons that lost limbs or were otherwise damaged, including the Barney the Dinosaur and Pink Panther balloons, which were forcibly deflated by officers of the New York City Police Department (NYPD).

The incidents led to scrutiny by Mayor Rudy Giuliani and changes in the parade, including a ban on larger balloons such as the Cat in the Hat. The most seriously injured attendee settled a lawsuit out of court. The image of the Barney balloon's destruction by police knives and boots—its so-called "murder"—has found enduring popularity through social media, owing partly to popular hatred of Barney.

== Background ==
The Macy's Thanksgiving Day Parade has taken place annually since 1924, except 1942 through 1944 due to the Second World War. In 1927, the first balloons, designed by Tony Sarg, debuted to great excitement. Giant balloons of popular characters would become the hallmark of the parade.

== Parade day ==
The 1997 running of the parade featured 17 giant balloons, 18 novelty balloons, and seven "falloons" (float–balloons) guided by a combined 1,200 handlers; it also featured 21 floats, 6 toy floats, 44 teams of clowns, 14 marching bands, and 30 costumed characters. There were four new balloons: the television and book character Arthur; a first-of-its-kind three-character balloon featuring the Rugrats characters Tommy Pickles, Chuckie, and Spike; Bumpé, a Swedish cow; and an original creation, Ms. Petula Pig, a ballerina. The new falloons were the World of Wiggle, sponsored by Jello, and Dr. Seuss's Grinch. Two non-falloon floats, one related to the film Anastasia and the other about a calf named Annabelle who wants to fly, also debuted.

The day of the parade saw winds with gusts over 40 miles per hour (64 km/h). When weather presenter Al Roker described the winds as gale force shortly before the parade, one Macy's official objected and said that windspeeds were going down. Officials discussed with the NYPD whether to scrap the balloon portion of the parade, but decided to retain them as windspeeds were decreasing. Macy's officials told the police that they could handle whatever might arise. However, speeds returned to figures as high as 43 miles per hour (69 km/h) during the parade, and balloon handlers struggled to maintain control of them, "h[anging] on for dear life" in the words of The New York Times. Significant incidents then occurred with the Pink Panther, Barney, and Cat in the Hat balloons, before a crowd of over one million. According to the Times, "perhaps a dozen" balloons were damaged overall, several losing limbs to wind-related issues.

Cat In The Hat was the first balloon down, as his head struck a tree at 81st street, marking the end of his run in the parade. The Pink Panther balloon began to veer and implode at Broadway and 42nd Street. An NYPD inspector called for a knife, which another officer handed to him. He then sliced in to the balloon's tail with the five-inch blade, which caused it to stabilize while also sending pieces of pink rubber into the crowd. The collapsing balloon fell onto its handlers, which according to unconfirmed reports knocked a handler unconscious.

After the grounding of the Pink Panther balloon, the NYPD removed the last two balloons from the parade for safety reasons. Many balloon handlers whose balloons had been downed assisted with the reining-in of those that were still aloft.

Home video of deflation
- "Thanksgiving '97. The day Barney was killed"

At 51st Street, handlers struggled to maintain control of the Barney balloon, which was punctured by a lamppost before crashing onto the handlers. One handler said that "Everything turned purple", while another said "Barney attacked us". Officers swarmed the falling balloon and repeatedly stabbed it and stomped on it to release the helium that held it aloft, to cheers from the crowd. One child was quoted as saying "Barney's dead! He's dead! Yeah!".

Most dramatically, at 72nd Street and Central Park West, the six-story-tall Cat in the Hat balloon twice struck the arm of a lamppost, which according to one onlooker was already wobbling in the high wind and according to another had been struck by a preceding balloon as well. The arm fell, injuring four people, with two sustaining serious head wounds. One of the two suffered a nearly fatal skull fracture and was in a coma for 24 days. The two more minor injuries consisted of facial bruising. The Cat in the Hat balloon was pulled from the parade at 36th Street along with the Quik Bunny balloon.

== Aftermath ==
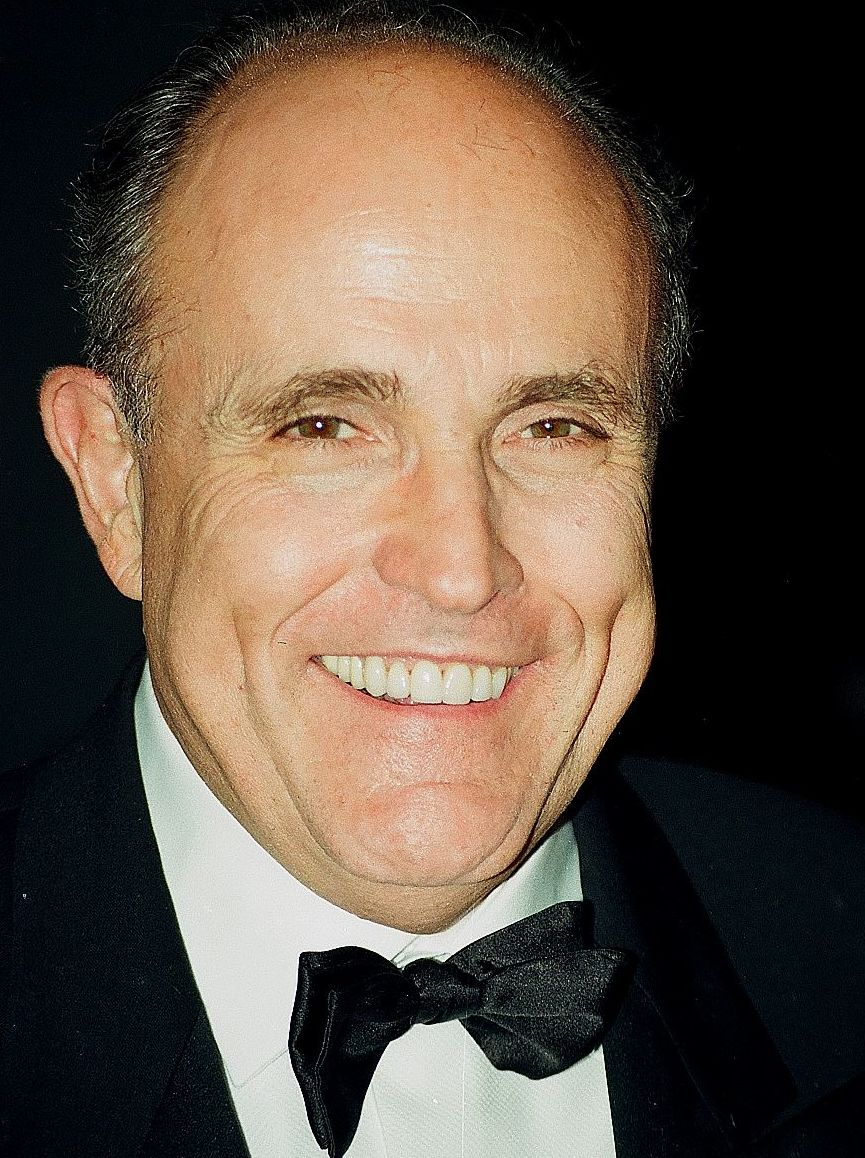
Rudy Giuliani in 2000

New York mayor Rudy Giuliani announced a task force to investigate the incidents. Macy's introduced physical fitness tests for its volunteer balloon handlers, and provided them with classroom instruction on geometry, outdoor training, and a free three-month gym membership. For the 1998 parade, lampposts had their arms removed, trees were pruned, and a meteorologist's counsel was retained. Balloons were limited to dimensions of 70 feet high, 78 feet long and 40 feet wide, ending the presence of the Cat in the Hat, Pink Panther, and Woody Woodpecker balloons. Balloons were tethered to two 800-pound vehicles, rather than being led only by pedestrians, and a police officer was assigned to each balloon's team, with the authority to remove it from the parade if needed.

The woman who was left comatose for a month filed a $395 million lawsuit against Macy's, New York City, and the lamppost's manufacturer. According to the suit, she suffered permanent brain damage as a result of the injury. She settled the suit in 2001 for an undisclosed sum, shortly before jury selection was to take place; the city was not responsible for any part of the settlement.

The woman began traveling out of New York City each Thanksgiving. She gained attention again in 2006 when a plane crashed into her apartment. The engine landed in her bedroom while she was out of the house; the pilot, New York Yankees pitcher Cory Lidle, was killed, as was his flight instructor.

The spectacle of the Barney balloon being stabbed and stomped by NYPD officers re-entered the public consciousness after a home video was posted to YouTube in 2013, and later to TikTok. Owing in part to hatred of Barney, the video has enjoyed enduring popularity in the years since. Many commentators, including the uploader of the home video, humorously characterize the incident as Barney the character having been murdered. In 2022, People ranked the Barney deflation as the "biggest balloon blunder" in the parade's 98 years.
