= 64th Primetime Creative Arts Emmy Awards =

2012 American television programming awards

- Date: September 15, 2012
- Location: Nokia Theatre; Los Angeles, California
- Presented by: Academy of Television Arts & Sciences
- Most awards: Game of Thrones (6)

Television/radio coverage
- Network: ReelzChannel

The 64th Annual Primetime Creative Arts Emmy Awards ceremony was held on September 15 at the Nokia Theatre in Downtown Los Angeles and was televised September 22, 2012 on ReelzChannel. This is in conjunction with the annual Primetime Emmy Awards and is presented in recognition of technical and other similar achievements in American television programming.

== Winners and nominees ==
Winners are listed first and highlighted in bold:

=== Governor's Award ===
- **American Idol**

=== Programs ===
Programs
**Outstanding Reality Program**: **Undercover Boss (CBS)**; Antiques Roadshow (PBS); Jamie Oliver's Food Revolution (ABC); MythBusters (Discovery Channel); Shark Tank (ABC); Who Do You Think You Are? (NBC)	**Outstanding Variety, Music, or Comedy Special**: **The Kennedy Center Honors (CBS)**; Betty White's 90th Birthday: A Tribute to America's Golden Girl (NBC); Kathy Griffin: Tired Hooker (Bravo); Mel Brooks and Dick Cavett Together Again (HBO); Tony Bennett: Duets II (PBS)
**Outstanding Nonfiction Series**: **Frozen Planet (Discovery Channel)**; American Masters (PBS); Anthony Bourdain: No Reservations (Travel Channel); Inside the Actors Studio (Bravo); The Weight of the Nation (HBO)	**Outstanding Nonfiction Special**: **George Harrison: Living in the Material World (HBO)**; 6 Days to Air: The Making of South Park (Comedy Central); Bobby Fischer Against the World (HBO); Gloria: In Her Own Words (HBO); Paul Simon's Graceland Journey: Under African Skies (A&E)
**Outstanding Animated Program**: **The Penguins of Madagascar (Episode: "The Return of the Revenge of Dr. Blowhole") (Nickelodeon)**; American Dad! (Episode: "Hot Water") (Fox); Bob's Burgers (Episode: "Burgerboss") (Fox); Futurama (Episode: "The Tip of the Zoidberg") (Comedy Central); The Simpsons (Episode: "Holidays of Future Passed") (Fox)	**Outstanding Short-Format Animated Program**: **Regular Show (Episode: "Eggscellent") (Cartoon Network)**; Adventure Time (Episode: "Too Young") (Cartoon Network); Mad (Episode: "Kitchen Nightmare Before Christmas / How I Met Your Mummy") (Cartoon Network); Phineas and Ferb (Episode: "The Doonkleberry Imperative") (Disney Channel); Robot Chicken (Episode: "Fight Club Paradise") (Adult Swim)
**Outstanding Children's Program**: **Wizards of Waverly Place (Disney Channel)**; Degrassi (TeenNick); Good Luck Charlie (Disney Channel); iCarly (Nickelodeon); Victorious (Nickelodeon)	**Outstanding Children's Nonfiction, Reality, or Reality-Competition Program**: **Sesame Street: Growing Hope Against Hunger (PBS)**; It Gets Better Project (MTV); The Weight of the Nation for Kids: The Great Cafeteria Takeover (HBO)
**Outstanding Special Class Program**: **65th Tony Awards (CBS)**; 54th Grammy Awards (CBS); 69th Golden Globe Awards (NBC); 84th Academy Awards (ABC); Herbie Hancock, Gustavo Dudamel, and the Los Angeles Philharmonic Celebrate Gershwin (PBS); Live at the Beacon Theater (FX)	**Outstanding Short-Format Live-Action Entertainment Program**: **Childrens Hospital (Cartoon Network)**; 30 Rock: The Webisodes (NBC.com); The Daily Show Correspondents Explain (thedailyshow.com); Parks and Recreation: April and Andy's Road Trip (NBC.com); Web Therapy (lstudio.com)
**Outstanding Special Class – Short-Format Nonfiction Program**: **DGA Moments in Time (dga.org)**; 30 Rock: Ask Tina (NBC.com); Bravo's Top Chef: Last Chance Kitchen (bravotv.com); Jay Leno's Garage (jaylenosgarage.com); Thank a Vet (history.com)	**Exceptional Merit in Documentary Filmmaking**: **Have You Heard from Johannesburg? (PBS)**; The Amish (PBS); Paradise Lost 3: Purgatory (HBO)

=== Acting ===
Acting
**Outstanding Guest Actor in a Comedy Series**: **Jimmy Fallon as Various Characters on Saturday Night Live (Episode: "Host: Jimmy Fallon") (NBC)**; Will Arnett as Devon Banks on 30 Rock (Episode: "Idiots Are People Three!") (NBC); Bobby Cannavale as Dr. Mike Cruz on Nurse Jackie (Episode: "Disneyland Sucks") (Showtime); Michael J. Fox as Himself on Curb Your Enthusiasm (Episode: "Larry vs. Michael J. Fox") (HBO); Jon Hamm as Abner / David Brinkley on 30 Rock (Episode: "Live from Studio 6H") (NBC); Greg Kinnear as Tad on Modern Family (Episode: "Me? Jealous?") (ABC)	**Outstanding Guest Actress in a Comedy Series**: **Kathy Bates as The Ghost of Charlie Harper on Two and a Half Men (Episode: "Why We Gave Up Women") (CBS)**; Elizabeth Banks as Avery Jessup-Donaghy on 30 Rock (Episode: "The Return of Avery Jessup") (NBC); Margaret Cho as Kim Jong-il on 30 Rock (Episode: "The Return of Avery Jessup") (NBC); Dot-Marie Jones as Shannon Beiste on Glee (Episode: "Choke") (Fox); Melissa McCarthy as Various Characters on Saturday Night Live (Episode: "Host: Melissa McCarthy") (NBC); Maya Rudolph as Various Characters on Saturday Night Live (Episode: "Host: Maya Rudolph") (NBC)
**Outstanding Guest Actor in a Drama Series**: **Jeremy Davies as Dickie Bennett on Justified (Episode: "Coalition") (FX)**; Dylan Baker as Colin Sweeney on The Good Wife (Episode: "Marthas and Caitlins") (CBS); Ben Feldman as Michael Ginsberg on Mad Men (Episode: "Dark Shadows") (AMC); Michael J. Fox as Louis Canning on The Good Wife (Episode: "Parenting Made Easy") (CBS); Mark Margolis as Héctor "Tio" Salamanca on Breaking Bad (Episode: "Face Off") (AMC); Jason Ritter as Mark Cyr on Parenthood (Episode: "Politics") (NBC)	**Outstanding Guest Actress in a Drama Series**: **Martha Plimpton as Patti Nyholm on The Good Wife (Episode: "The Dream Team") (CBS)**; Joan Cusack as Sheila Jackson on Shameless (Episode: "Can I Have a Mother") (Showtime); Loretta Devine as Adele Webber on Grey's Anatomy (Episode: "If Only You Were Lonely") (ABC); Julia Ormond as Marie Calvet on Mad Men (Episode: "The Phantom") (AMC); Jean Smart as Roseanna Remmick on Harry's Law (Episode: "The Rematch") (NBC); Uma Thurman as Rebecca Duvall on Smash (Episode: "Tech") (NBC)
**Outstanding Voice-Over Performance**: **Maurice LaMarche as Clamps, Donbot, Hyperchicken, Calculon, Hedonismbot, and Morbo on Futurama (Episode: "The Silence of the Clamps") (Comedy Central)**; Hank Azaria as Moe Szyslak, Duffman, Mexican Duffman, Carl, Comic Book Guy, and Chief Wiggum on The Simpsons (Episode: "Moe Goes from Rags to Riches") (Fox); Dan Povenmire as Dr. Heinz Doofenshmirtz on Phineas and Ferb the Movie: Across the 2nd Dimension (Disney Channel); Rob Riggle as Noel on Prep & Landing: Naughty vs. Nice (ABC); Brenda Strong as Mary Alice Young on Desperate Housewives (Episodes: "Give Me the Blame" + "Finishing the Hat") (ABC); Kristen Wiig as Lola Bunny on The Looney Tunes Show (Episode: "Double Date") (Cartoon Network)

=== Art Direction ===
Art Direction
**Outstanding Art Direction for a Multi-Camera Series**: **2 Broke Girls (Episodes: "And the Rich People Problems", "And the Reality Check", "And the Pop Up Sale") (CBS)**; 30 Rock (Episode: "Live from Studio 6H") (NBC); Hell's Kitchen (Episodes: "Episode 915", "Episode 916") (Fox); How I Met Your Mother (Episodes: "Now We're Even"; "The Magician's Code: Part I"; "The Magician's Code: Part II") (CBS); Mike & Molly (Episodes: "Goin' Fishin'", "Valentine's Piggyback", "The Wedding") (CBS)	**Outstanding Art Direction for a Single-Camera Series**: **Boardwalk Empire (Episodes: "Peg of Old", "Battle of the Century", "To the Lost") (HBO) (TIE)**; **Game of Thrones (Episodes: "Garden of Bones", "The Ghost of Harrenhal", "A Man Without Honor") (HBO) (TIE)**; Downton Abbey (Episodes: "Episode Four", "Episode Seven") (PBS); Justified (Episodes: "Cut Ties", "Loose Ends", "Measures") (FX); Mad Men (Episode: "At the Codfish Ball") (AMC)
**Outstanding Art Direction for a Miniseries or Movie**: **Great Expectations (PBS)**; American Horror Story (Episodes: "Pilot", "Open House") (FX); Hatfields & McCoys (History); Hemingway & Gellhorn (HBO); Sherlock ("A Scandal in Belgravia") (PBS)	**Outstanding Art Direction for Variety or Nonfiction Programming**: **54th Grammy Awards (CBS) (TIE)**; **65th Tony Awards (CBS) (TIE)**; 84th Academy Awards (ABC); Saturday Night Live (Episodes: "Host: Jimmy Fallon", "Host: Melissa McCarthy", "Host: Mick Jagger") (NBC); The Voice (Episodes: "Blind Auditions: Part II", "Battle Rounds: Part I", "Live Shows: Part IV") (NBC)

=== Casting ===
Casting
**Outstanding Casting for a Comedy Series**: **Girls – Jennifer Euston (HBO)**; The Big C – Bernard Telsey (Showtime); Modern Family – Jeff Greenberg (ABC); New Girl - Seth Yanklewitz, Juel Bestrop, Anya Colloff, and Michael Nicolo (Fox); Nurse Jackie - Julie Tucker and Ross Meyerson (Showtime); Veep - Allison Jones, Pat Moran, and Jennifer Euston (HBO)	**Outstanding Casting for a Drama Series**: **Homeland - Junie Lowry-Johnson, Libby Goldstein, Judy Henderson, Craig Fincannon and Lisa Mae Fincannon (Showtime)**; Boardwalk Empire - Meredith Tucker (HBO); Downton Abbey - Jill Trevellick (PBS); Game of Thrones - Nina Gold and Robert Sterne (HBO); The Good Wife - Mark Saks (CBS); Mad Men - Laura Schiff and Carrie Audino (AMC)
**Outstanding Casting for a Miniseries, Movie, or Special**: **Game Change - David Rubin, Richard Hicks, Pat Moran, and Kathleen Chopin (HBO)**; American Horror Story - Robert J. Ulrich and Eric Dawson (FX); Five - Randi Hiller and Tamara-Lee Notcutt (Lifetime); Hatfields & McCoys - Fern Champion and Amy Hubbard (History); Sherlock: ("A Scandal in Belgravia") - Kate Rhodes James (PBS)

=== Choreography ===
Choreography
**Outstanding Choreography**
- **Joshua Bergasse – Smash (Routines: "National Pastime", "Let's Be Bad", "Never Met a Wolf") (NBC)**
  - Dancing with the Stars (Routine: Without You) (ABC)
  - So You Think You Can Dance (Routines: "In this Shirt", "Turning Tables", "Heart Asks for Pleasure First", "Misty Blue", "Velocity", "Whatever, Lola Wants", "Please, Mr. Jailor", "Where Do I Begin") (Fox)

=== Cinematography ===
Cinematography
**Outstanding Cinematography for a Multi-Camera Series**: **Two and a Half Men (Episode: "Sips, Sonnets, and Sodomy") (CBS)**; 2 Broke Girls (Episode: "Pilot") (CBS); How I Met Your Mother (Episode: "46 Minutes") (CBS); Mike & Molly (Episode: "Victoria Can't Drive") (CBS); Pair of Kings (Episode: "The Evil King: Part II") (Disney XD)	**Outstanding Cinematography for a Single-Camera Series**: **Boardwalk Empire (Episode: "21") (HBO)**; Breaking Bad (Episode: "Face Off") (AMC); Glee (Episode: "Asian F") (Fox); Mad Men (Episode: "The Phantom") (AMC); Pan Am (Episode: "Pilot") (ABC)
**Outstanding Cinematography for a Miniseries or Movie**: **Great Expectations (Episode: "Part II") (PBS)**; Game Change (HBO); Hemingway & Gellhorn (HBO); Sherlock ("A Scandal in Belgravia") (PBS); Treasure Island (Episode: "Part I") (Syfy)	**Outstanding Cinematography for Nonfiction Programming**: **Frozen Planet (Episode: "Ends of the Earth") (Discovery Channel)**; Anthony Bourdain: No Reservations (Episode: "Mozambique") (Travel Channel); George Harrison: Living in the Material World (HBO); Prohibition (Episode: "A Nation Of Drunkards") (PBS); Whale Wars (Episode: "Race to Save Lives") (Animal Planet)
**Outstanding Cinematography for Reality Programming**: **Deadliest Catch (Episode: "I Don't Wanna Die") (Discovery Channel)**; The Amazing Race (Episode: "Let Them Drink Their Haterade") (CBS); Project Runway (Episode: "The Finale Challenge") (Lifetime); Survivor (Episode: "Running the Show") (CBS); Top Chef (Episode: "Fit for an Evil Queen") (Bravo)

=== Commercial ===
Commercial
**Outstanding Commercial**
- **"Best Job" (Procter & Gamble)**
  - "The Bark Side" (Volkswagen)
  - "Color Changes Everything" (Target)
  - "The Dog Strikes Back (Volkswagen)
  - "It's Halftime in America" (Chrysler)

=== Costuming ===
Costuming
**Outstanding Costumes for a Series**: **Game of Thrones (Episode: "The Prince of Winterfell") (HBO)**; Boardwalk Empire (Episode: "21") (HBO); The Borgias (Episode: "The Confession") (Showtime); Downton Abbey (Episode: "Episode One") (PBS); Once Upon a Time (Episode: "Hat Trick") (ABC)	**Outstanding Costumes for a Miniseries, Movie, or Special**: **Great Expectations (Episode: "Part II") (PBS)**; American Horror Story (Episode: "Halloween", Part I) (FX); Hatfields & McCoys (Episode: "Part I") (History); Hemingway & Gellhorn (HBO); Sherlock ("A Scandal in Belgravia") (PBS); Treasure Island (Episode: "Part I") (Syfy)

=== Directing ===
Directing
**Outstanding Directing for Nonfiction Programming**: **Martin Scorsese for George Harrison: Living in the Material World (HBO)**; Joe Berlinger and Bruce Sinofsky for Paradise Lost 3: Purgatory (HBO); Craig Spirko for Project Runway (Lifetime); Bertram van Munster for The Amazing Race (CBS); Robert B. Weide for American Masters (PBS)	**Outstanding Directing for a Variety, Music, or Comedy Series**: **Don Roy King for Saturday Night Live (NBC)**; Jerry Foley for Late Show with David Letterman (CBS); Jim Hoskinson for The Colbert Report (Comedy Central); Jonathan Krisel for Portlandia (IFC); Chuck O'Neil for The Daily Show with Jon Stewart (Comedy Central)

=== Hairstyling ===
Hairstyling
**Outstanding Hairstyling for a Single-Camera Series**: **Downton Abbey (Episode: "Episode One") (PBS)**; Boardwalk Empire (Episode: "Two Boats and a Lifeguard") (HBO); The Borgias (Episode: "The Confession") (Showtime); Game of Thrones (Episode: "The Old Gods and the New") (HBO); Mad Men (Episode: "The Phantom") (AMC)	**Outstanding Hairstyling for a Multi-Camera Series or Special**: **Saturday Night Live (Episode: "Host: Zooey Deschanel") (NBC)**; Dancing with the Stars (Episode: "Episode 1407") (ABC); Victorious (Episode: "April Fools Blank") (Nickelodeon); The Voice (Episode: "Episode 210A") (NBC)
**Outstanding Hairstyling for a Miniseries or Movie**: **American Horror Story (FX)**; Hatfields & McCoys (History); Hemingway & Gellhorn (HBO)

=== Interactive Media ===
Interactive Media
**Outstanding Creative Achievement in Interactive Media – Enhancement to a Television Program or Series**: **The Team Coco Sync App (TBS)**; Bravo's Top Chef: Last Chance Kitchen (bravotv.com); Game of Thrones Season Two – Enhanced Digital Experience (HBO)	**Outstanding Creative Achievement in Interactive Media – Original Interactive Television Programming**: **Dirty Work (rides.tv)**; Psych HashTag Killer (USA); What's Trending With Shira Lazar (whatstrending.com)

=== Lighting Design / Direction ===
Lighting Design / Direction
**Outstanding Lighting Design / Lighting Direction for a Variety Series**: **So You Think You Can Dance (Episode: "Season 8 Finale") (Fox)**; American Idol (Episode: "Finale") (Fox); Dancing with The Stars (Episode: "Episode 1307") (ABC); Saturday Night Live (Episode: "Host: Jimmy Fallon") (NBC); The Voice (Episode: "Live Shows: Part I") (NBC)	**Outstanding Lighting Design / Lighting Direction for a Variety Special**: **54th Grammy Awards (CBS)**; 84th Academy Awards (ABC); Andrea Bocelli Live In Central Park (PBS); Super Bowl XLVI Halftime Show starring Madonna (NBC); Victoria's Secret Fashion Show 2011 (CBS)

=== Main Title Design ===
Main Title Design
**Outstanding Main Title Design**
- **Great Expectations (PBS)**
  - American Horror Story (FX)
  - Magic City (Starz)
  - New Girl (Fox)
  - Strike Back (Cinemax)

=== Make-up ===
Make-up
**Outstanding Make-up for a Single-Camera Series (Non-Prosthetic)**: **Game of Thrones (Episode: "The Old Gods and the New") (HBO)**; Boardwalk Empire (Episode: "Georgia Peaches) (HBO); Glee (Episode: "Yes/No") (Fox); Mad Men (Episode: "Christmas Waltz") (AMC); The Middle (Episode: "The Play") (ABC)	**Outstanding Make-up for a Multi-Camera Series or Special (Non-Prosthetic)**: **Dancing with the Stars (Episode: "Episode 1307") (ABC)**; Hot in Cleveland (Episode: "Bridezelka) (TV Land); How I Met Your Mother (Episode: "Trilogy Time") (CBS); Saturday Night Live (Episode: "Host: Katy Perry") (NBC); Victorious (Episode: "April Fools Blank") (Nickelodeon)
**Outstanding Make-up for a Miniseries or Movie (Non-Prosthetic)**: **Hatfields & McCoys (History)**; American Horror Story (FX); Hemingway & Gellhorn (HBO)	**Outstanding Prosthetic Make-up for a Series, Miniseries, Movie, or Special**: **The Walking Dead (Episode: "What Lies Ahead") (AMC)**; American Horror Story (FX); Boardwalk Empire (Episode: "The Age of Reason") (HBO); Game of Thrones (Episode: "Valar Morghulis") (HBO); Once Upon a Time (Episode: "Dreamy") (ABC)

=== Music ===
Music
**Outstanding Music Composition for a Series (Original Dramatic Score)**: **Downton Abbey (Episode: "Episode Six") (PBS)**; 30 Rock (Episode: "The Tuxedo Begins") (NBC); The Borgias (Episode: "The Confession") (Showtime); Pan Am (Episode: "Pilot") (ABC); Smash (Episode: "Publicity") (NBC)	**Outstanding Music Composition for a Miniseries, Movie, or Special (Original Dramatic Score)**: **Hemingway & Gellhorn (HBO)**; Game Change (HBO); Hatfields & McCoys (Episode: "Part I") (History); Missing (Episode: "The Hard Drive") (ABC); Prep & Landing: Naughty vs. Nice (ABC); Sherlock ("A Scandal in Belgravia") (PBS)
**Outstanding Music Direction**: **The Kennedy Center Honors (CBS)**; Christmas in Washington (TNT); Country Music: In Performance at the White House (PBS); Michael Feinstein: The Sinatra Legacy (PBS); Seth MacFarlane: Swingin' in Concert (Epix); The Thomashefskys: Music and Memories of a Life in the Yiddish Theater (PBS)	**Outstanding Original Music and Lyrics**: **65th Tony Awards (Song: "It's Not Just for Gays Anymore") (CBS)**; The Heart of Christmas (Song: "The Heart of Christmas") (GMC); Raising Hope (Episode: "Prodigy", Song: "Welcome Back to Hope") (Fox); Saturday Night Live (Episode: "Host: Jason Segel", Song: "I Can't Believe I'm Hosting") (NBC); Smash (Episode: "Pilot", Song: "Let Me Be Your Star") (NBC)
**Outstanding Original Main Title Theme Music**: **Page Eight (PBS)**; Great Expectations (PBS); Hell on Wheels (AMC); Homeland (Showtime); Touch (Fox)

=== Picture Editing ===
Picture Editing
**Outstanding Single-Camera Picture Editing for a Drama Series**: **Homeland (Episode: "Pilot") (Showtime)**; Breaking Bad (Episode: "End Times") (AMC); Breaking Bad (Episode: "Face Off") (AMC); Downton Abbey (Episode: "Episode Seven") (PBS); Mad Men (Episode: "Far Away Places") (AMC)	**Outstanding Single-Camera Picture Editing for a Comedy Series**: **Curb Your Enthusiasm (Episode: "Palestinian Chicken") (HBO)**; 30 Rock (Episode: "Leap Day") (NBC); 30 Rock (Episode: "The Tuxedo Begins") (NBC); Modern Family (Episode: "Election Day") (ABC); Modern Family (Episode: "Leap Day") (ABC)
**Outstanding Single-Camera Picture Editing for a Miniseries or Movie**: **Hatfields & McCoys (Episode: "Part II") (History)**; American Horror Story (Episode: "Birth") (FX); Game Change (HBO); Hemingway & Gellhorn (HBO); Sherlock ("A Scandal in Belgravia") (PBS)	**Outstanding Multi-Camera Picture Editing for a Comedy Series**: **How I Met Your Mother (Episode: "Trilogy Time") (CBS)**; 2 Broke Girls (Episode: "And the Kosher Cupcakes") (CBS); The Big Bang Theory (Episode: "The Countdown Reflection") (CBS); Hot in Cleveland (Episode: "God and Football") (TV Land); Two and a Half Men (Episode: "Why We Gave Up Women") (CBS)
**Outstanding Picture Editing for Short-Form Segments and Variety Specials**: **2012 Rock and Roll Hall of Fame Induction Ceremony (HBO)**; 84th Academy Awards (Opening Film) (ABC); The Colbert Report (Episode: "Stephen Colbert Occupies Wall Street") (Comedy Central); The Daily Show with Jon Stewart (Episode: "A Love Supreme: Profanity & Nudity on TV") (Comedy Central); Extreme Makeover: Home Edition (Rise and Honor: A Veterans Day Special) (ABC); Live at the Beacon Theater (FX)	**Outstanding Picture Editing for Nonfiction Programming**: **Frozen Planet (Episode: "Ends of the Earth") (Discovery Channel)**; American Masters ("Johnny Carson: King of Late Night") (PBS); Anthony Bourdain: No Reservations (Episode: "U.S. Desert") (Travel Channel); Beyond Scared Straight (Episode: "Oakland County, MI") (A&E); George Harrison: Living in the Material World (HBO)
**Outstanding Picture Editing for Reality Programming**: **Deadliest Catch (Episode: "I Don't Wanna Die") (Discovery Channel)**; The Amazing Race (Episode: "Let Them Drink Their Haterade") (CBS); Project Runway (Episode: "My Pet Project") (Lifetime); Survivor (Episode: "Cult-Like") (CBS); Top Chef (Episode: Fit for an Evil Queen) (Bravo)

=== Sound ===
Sound
**Outstanding Sound Editing for a Series**: **Game of Thrones (Episode: "Blackwater") (HBO)**; Boardwalk Empire (Episode: "Gimcrack & Bunkum") (HBO); Breaking Bad (Episode: "Face Off") (AMC); CSI: Miami (Episode: "Blown Away") (CBS); The Walking Dead (Episode: "Beside the Dying Fire") (AMC)	**Outstanding Sound Editing for a Miniseries, Movie, or Special**: **Hemingway & Gellhorn (HBO)**; American Horror Story (Episode: "Piggy Piggy") (FX); Hatfields & McCoys (History); The River (Episode: "Doctor Emmet Cole") (ABC); Sherlock ("A Scandal in Belgravia") (PBS)
**Outstanding Sound Editing for Nonfiction Programming (Single or Multi-Camera)**: **Frozen Planet (Episode: "Ends of the Earth") (Discovery Channel)**; The Amazing Race (Episode: "Let Them Drink Their Haterade") (CBS); George Harrison: Living in the Material World (HBO); Paul Simon's Graceland Journey: Under African Skies (A&E); Prohibition (Episode: "A Nation Of Hypocrites") (PBS)	**Outstanding Sound Mixing for a Comedy or Drama Series (One Hour)**: **Game of Thrones (Episode: "Blackwater") (HBO)**; Breaking Bad (Episode: "Face Off") (AMC); Downton Abbey (Episode: "Episode One") (PBS); Homeland (Episode: "Marine One") (Showtime); Person of Interest (Episode: "Pilot") (CBS)
**Outstanding Sound Mixing for a Miniseries or Movie**: **Hatfields & McCoys (Episode: "Part I") (History)**; American Horror Story (Episode: "Piggy Piggy") (FX); Game Change (HBO); Hemingway & Gellhorn (HBO); Sherlock ("A Scandal in Belgravia") (PBS)	**Outstanding Sound Mixing for a Comedy or Drama Series (Half-Hour) and Animation**: **Modern Family (Episode: "Dude Ranch") (ABC)**; 30 Rock (Episode: "Live from Studio 6H") (NBC); Entourage (Episode: "The End") (HBO); Nurse Jackie (Episode: "Handle Your Scandal") (Showtime); Parks and Recreation (Episode: "End of the World") (NBC)
**Outstanding Sound Mixing for a Variety Series or Special**: **84th Academy Awards (ABC)**; Lionel Richie and Friends – In Concert (CBS); American Idol ("Episode: 1144") (Fox); 54th Grammy Awards (CBS)	**Outstanding Sound Mixing for Nonfiction Programming**: **Paul Simon's Graceland Journey: Under African Skies (A&E)**; The Amazing Race (Episode: "Let Them Drink Their Haterade") (CBS); Deadliest Catch (Episode: "I Don't Wanna Die") (Discovery Channel); Frozen Planet (Episode: "Ends of the Earth") (Discovery Channel); George Harrison: Living in the Material World (HBO)

=== Special Visual Effects ===
Special Visual Effects
**Outstanding Special Visual Effects**: **Game of Thrones (Episode: "Valar Morghulis") (HBO)**; Falling Skies (Episode: "Live and Learn" / "The Armory) (TNT); Inside The Human Body (Episode: "Episode 1") (TLC); Once Upon a Time (Episode: "The Stranger") (ABC); Pan Am (Episode: "Pilot") (ABC); The Walking Dead (Episode: "Beside the Dying Fire") (AMC)	**Outstanding Special Visual Effects in a Supporting Role**: **Boardwalk Empire (Episode: "Georgia Peaches") (HBO)**; Bones (Episode: "The Twist in the Twister") (Fox); The Borgias (Episode: "The Choice") (Showtime); Breaking Bad (Episode: "Face Off") (AMC); Hemingway & Gellhorn (HBO); Touch (Episode: "Pilot") (Fox)

=== Stunt Coordination ===
Stunt Coordination
**Outstanding Stunt Coordination**
- **Southland (Episode: "Wednesday") (TNT)**
  - American Horror Story (FX)
  - Criminal Minds (Episode: "The Bittersweet Science") (CBS)
  - Grimm (Episode: "Woman in Black") (NBC)
  - Hawaii Five-0 (Episode: "Kame'e: The Hero") (CBS)
  - NCIS: Los Angeles (Episode: "Blye, K") (CBS)

=== Technical Direction ===
Technical Direction
**Outstanding Technical Direction, Camerawork, Video Control for a Series**: **Saturday Night Live (Episode: "Host: Mick Jagger") (NBC)**; 30 Rock (Episode: "Live from Studio 6H") (NBC); The Big Bang Theory (Episode: "The Countdown Reflection") (CBS); Dancing with the Stars (Episode: "Episode 1410A") (ABC); Late Show with David Letterman (Episode: "Episode 3602") (CBS)	**Outstanding Technical Direction, Camerawork, Video Control for a Miniseries, Movie, or Special**: **Great Performances: Memphis (PBS)**; 54th Grammy Awards (CBS); 84th Academy Awards (ABC); The Kennedy Center Honors (CBS)

=== Writing ===
Writing
**Outstanding Writing for Nonfiction Programming**: **Prohibition: A Nation of Hypocrites (PBS)**; American Experience (Episode: "Clinton") (PBS); American Masters (PBS); Anthony Bourdain: No Reservations (Travel Channel); Sesame Street: Growing Hope Against Hunger (PBS)	**Outstanding Writing for a Variety, Music, or Comedy Program**: **The Daily Show with Jon Stewart (Comedy Central)**; The Colbert Report (Comedy Central); Portlandia (IFC); Real Time with Bill Maher (HBO); Saturday Night Live (NBC)

== Programs with multiple awards ==
By network (Note: Only includes categories above)

- HBO – 17
- CBS – 13
- PBS – 11
- Discovery Channel – 6
- NBC – 5
- ABC / Cartoon Network – 4
- History – 3
- Comedy Central / Disney Channel / Fox / FX / Showtime - 2

By program

- Game of Thrones – 6
- Frozen Planet / Great Expectations / Saturday Night Live – 4
- 65th Tony Awards / Boardwalk Empire / Hatfields & McCoys – 3
- Deadliest Catch / Downton Abbey / George Harrison: Living in the Material World / Hemingway & Gellhorn / Homeland / Secret Mountain Fort Awesome / 54th Grammy Awards / The Kennedy Center Honors / Two and a Half Men - 2

== Presenters ==
- Morena Baccarin
- Thom Beers
- Dane Boedigheimer
- Shane Brennan
- Dan Bucatinsky
- David Carbonara
- Frances Conroy
- Emily Deschanel
- Kenneth Ehrlich
- Johnny Galecki
- Greg Garcia
- Billy Gardell
- Mark Gardner
- Vince Gilligan
- Howard Gordon
- Kathy Griffin
- Sig Hansen
- Hart Hanson
- Neil Patrick Harris
- Christina Hendricks
- Adam Horowitz
- Tom Kenny
- Edward Kitsis
- Jim Kouf
- Lisa Kudrow
- LL Cool J
- Padma Lakshmi
- Nigel Lythgoe
- Mark Margolis
- Jennifer Morrison
- Mary Murphy
- Ryan Murphy
- David Neal
- Chris O'Donnell
- Martha Plimpton
- Bill Prady
- Mark Roberts
- Matthew Weiner
- Silas Weir Mitchell
