= Rubber Man =

- American Horror Story episode
- Episode no.: Season 1 Episode 8
- Directed by: Miguel Arteta
- Written by: Ryan Murphy
- Production code: 1ATS07
- Original air date: November 23, 2011
- Running time: 43 minutes

Guest appearances
- Kate Mara as Hayden McClaine; Zachary Quinto as Chad Warwick; Frances Conroy as Moira O'Hara; Lily Rabe as Nora Montgomery; Teddy Sears as Patrick; Christine Estabrook as Marcy; Kathleen Rose Perkins as Peggy; Richard Short as Gary; Azura Skye as Fiona; Kyle Davis as Dallas; Eric Close as Hugo Langdon; Morris Chestnut as Luke

Episode chronology
← Previous "Open House"	Next → "Spooky Little Girl"
- American Horror Story: Murder House

"Rubber Man" is the eighth episode of the first season of the television series American Horror Story, which premiered on the network FX on November 23, 2011. The episode was written by co-creator and executive producer Ryan Murphy and was directed by Miguel Arteta. This episode is rated TV-MA (LSV).

In this episode, the identity of the Rubber Man and the father of Vivien (Connie Britton)'s twins are revealed while she is driven insane by some of the house's occupants. Kate Mara and Zachary Quinto guest star as Hayden McClaine and Chad Warwick, respectively. Jessica Lange is absent in this episode.

The episode was released to mixed reviews, and holds a 58% approval rating on Rotten Tomatoes.

== Plot ==
Flashbacks reveal Tate to be the Rubber Man, who fathered Vivien's twins, attempting to provide a distraught Nora with a baby. The outfit is revealed to be a bondage suit Chad bought in hopes of reigniting his and Patrick's failing relationship. Tate donned the suit and killed Patrick and Chad after they decided not to have a child, hoping that a new family would move in and have a child, which Nora could then have instead. Moira gave Tate the couple's gun, which Tate used to make it look like a murder-suicide.

Hayden conspires with Nora to drive Vivien insane so that they can have her twins after she is committed. After many poltergeists, Vivien becomes unnerved and Moira, who opposes Hayden, tells her about "The Yellow Wallpaper" and that the house is haunted, urging her to leave while she still can. Vivien and Violet leave, but are confronted by the ghosts of the house intruders ("Home Invasion") outside, fleeing back into the house. Ben believes that Vivien is mentally unstable, since the police found no evidence of the intruders' presence, and prohibits her from leaving under threat of legal action, believing she is trying to take Violet and the twins away from him. Though she also saw the ghosts, Violet, afraid to leave Tate, lies and says she didn't see anything. Betrayed, Vivien later steals Marcy's handgun for protection. Hayden convinces Tate, as the Rubber Man, to attack Vivien. During the attack, Vivien accidentally shoots Ben, who heard the commotion. He medicates her until the police arrive, convinced she is a danger to herself and others. Luke arrives, having received the panic alert, and he and Ben argue. However, Vivien's reaction to another poltergeist results in the police taking her away to be committed. Vivien is heartbroken, but consoled that she can finally leave the house. Violet feels guilty because she lied, though Tate tells her that he'll always be there for her.

== Production ==
Evan Peters didn't find out until shooting began for "Rubber Man" that he was intended to be Rubber Man, and that he was both "shocked and grateful." About his character's interaction with Nora Montgomery (Lily Rabe), he added, "He sees that Nora's soul is disturbed and is very sad. He has this sort of sweet spot for people like that. It resonates with him, so he wants to help them out and make sure they're okay and peaceful." This was the only American Horror Story episode not to feature Jessica Lange until the beginning of the fifth season of the show, Hotel.

== Reception ==
Rotten Tomatoes reports a 58% approval rating, based on 12 reviews. The critical consensus reads, "["Rubber Man"] delivers the biggest reveal of the season as the mysterious identity of the man in the rubber suit is finally solved." James Queally of The Star-Ledger evaluated the series after this episode, saying, "This show just continually feels like it's one step forward, two steps back. It's too inconsistent, and too reliant on noise and smoke, to make me care all that much." TV Fanatic's Matt Richenthal commented on the episode, "For perhaps the first time all season, American Horror Story didn't leave me with many questions. There was plenty of frightening, violent nuttiness this week, but there were also answers."

In its original American broadcast, "Rubber Man" was seen by an estimated 2.81 million household viewers and gained a 1.6 ratings share among adults aged 18–49, according to Nielsen Media Research. The episode was down two tenths from the previous episode.
