= American Horror Story: Murder House =

First season of American Horror Story

- Season 1
- Promotional poster and home media cover art
- Showrunner: Ryan Murphy
- Starring: Connie Britton; Dylan McDermott; Evan Peters; Taissa Farmiga; Denis O'Hare; Jessica Lange
- No. of episodes: 12

Release
- Original network: FX
- Original release: October 5 – December 21, 2011

Season chronology
- Next → Asylum

The first season of American Horror Story, retroactively subtitled Murder House, centers on the Harmon family, who, after dealing with a miscarriage and infidelity, move to a restored mansion in Los Angeles, unaware that the ghosts of its former residents and their victims haunt the house. The ensemble cast includes Connie Britton, Dylan McDermott, Evan Peters, Taissa Farmiga, Denis O'Hare, and Jessica Lange.

Created by Ryan Murphy and Brad Falchuk for the cable network FX, American Horror Story was announced in February 2011, with production commencing that April. The season was broadcast between October 5 and December 21, 2011, being produced by 20th Century Fox Television. Dante Di Loreto served as executive producer alongside Murphy and Falchuk.

Murder House generally received positive reviews from critics and drew consistently high ratings for FX, ending its cycle as the biggest new cable series of the year. The season was nominated for various industry awards, including the Golden Globe Award for Best Television Series – Drama, and received a total of seventeen Emmy Award nominations. In addition, Lange won the Golden Globe, the Screen Actors Guild Award, and the Primetime Emmy Award for her supporting role.

== Cast and characters ==
=== Main ===
Murder House main cast

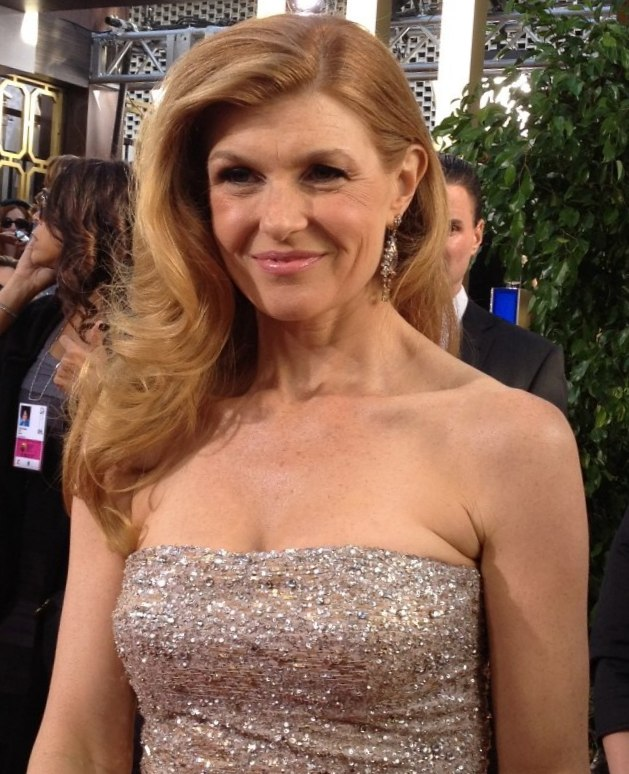
Connie Britton

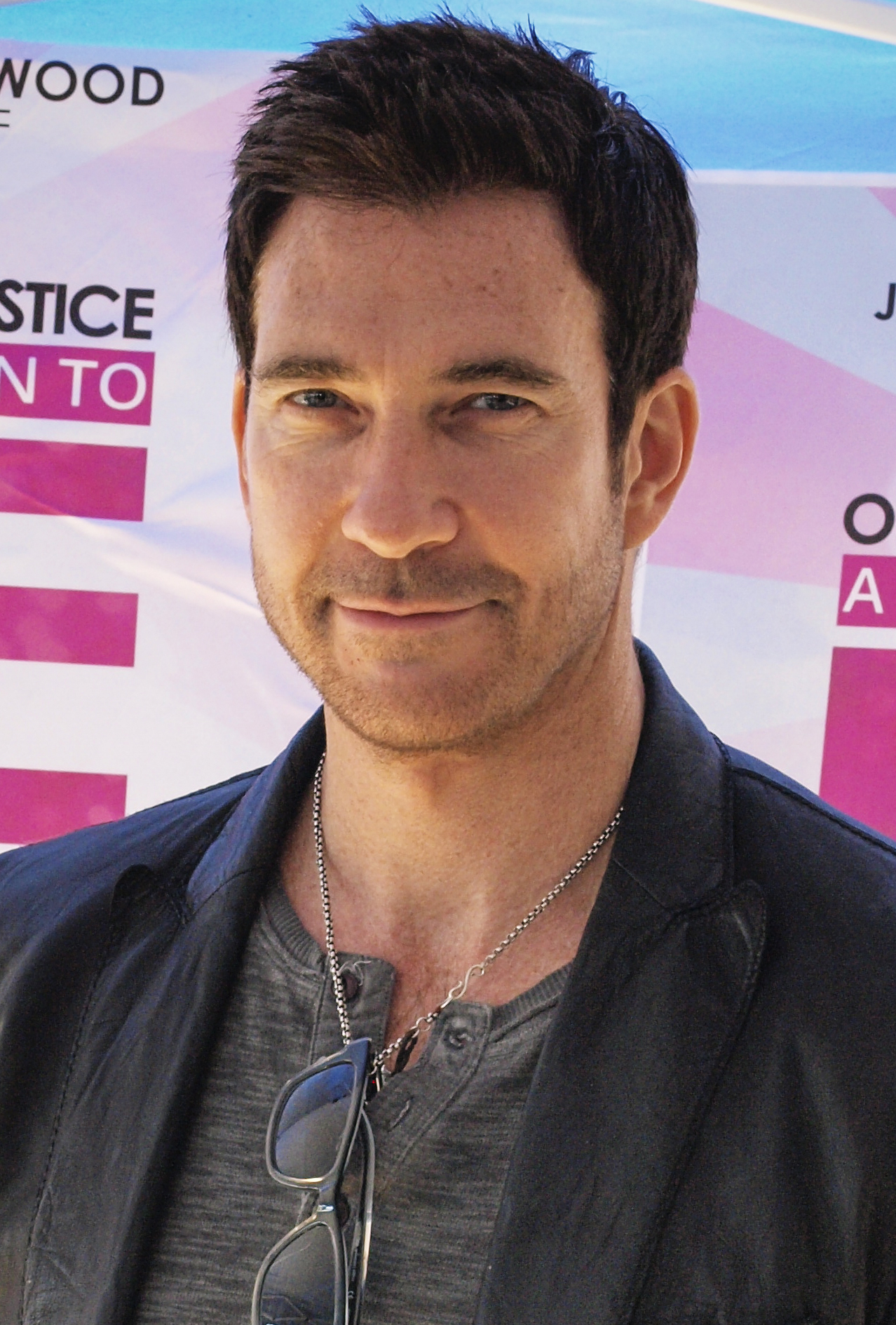
Dylan McDermott

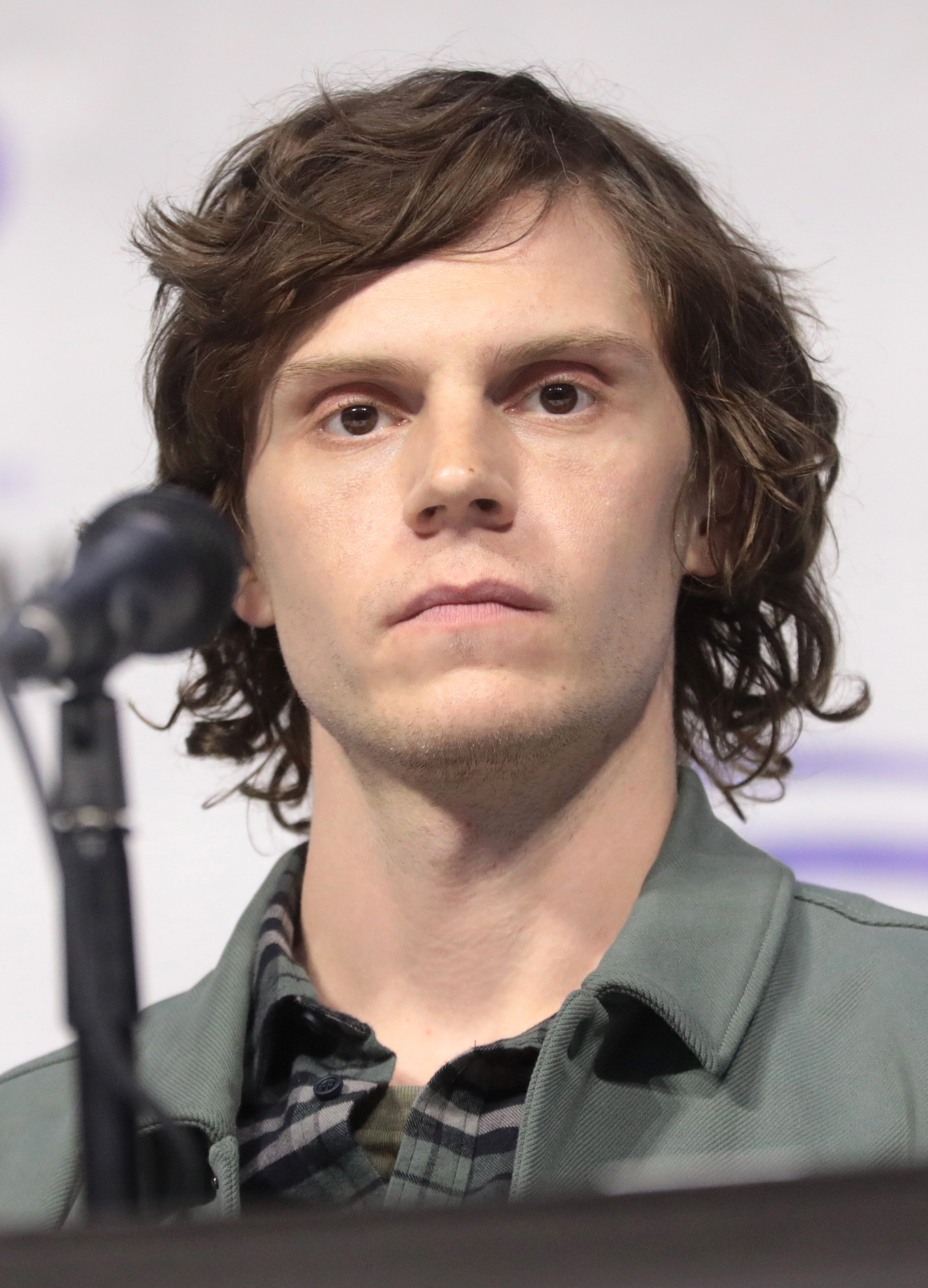
Evan Peters

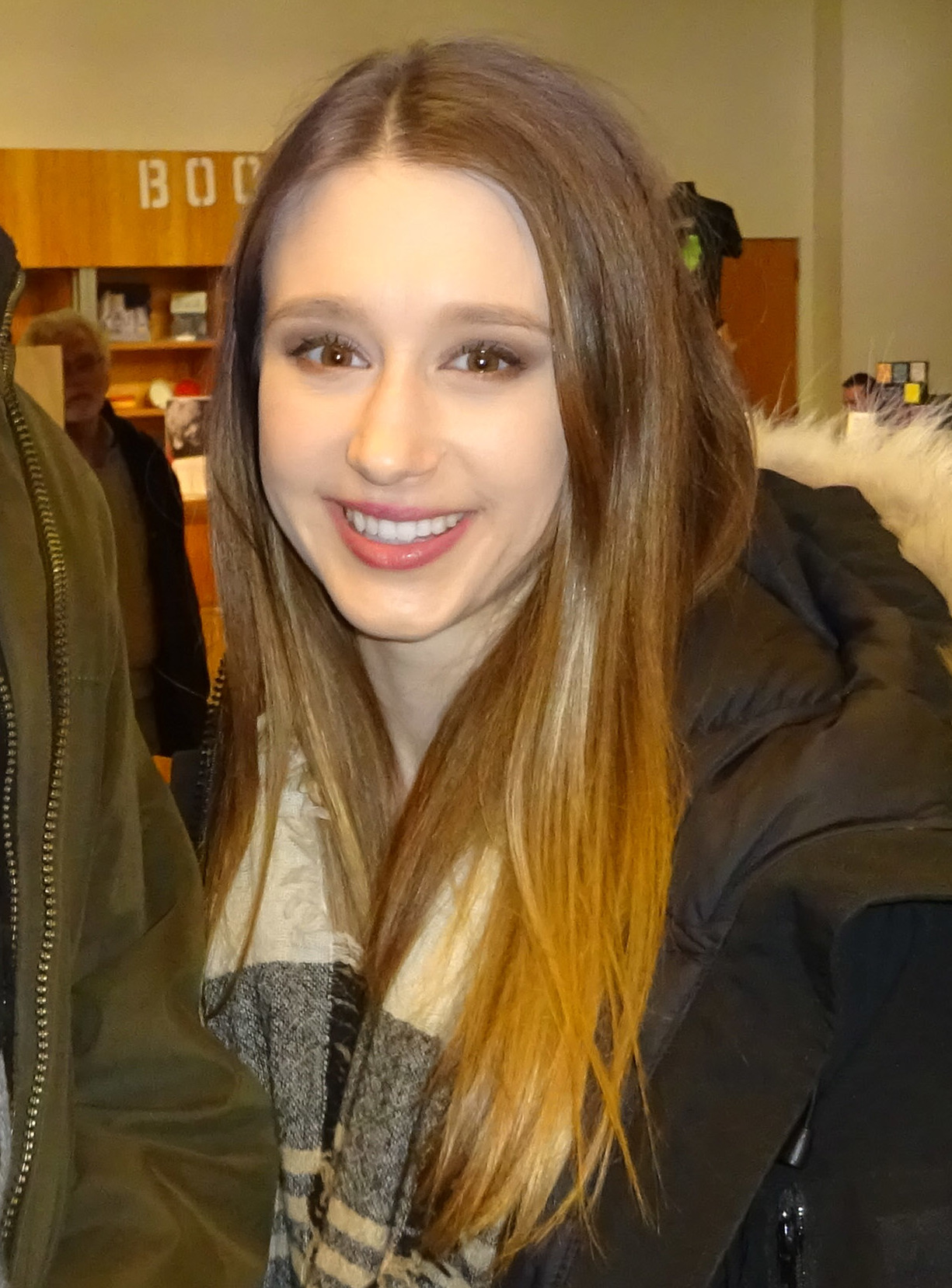
Taissa Farmiga

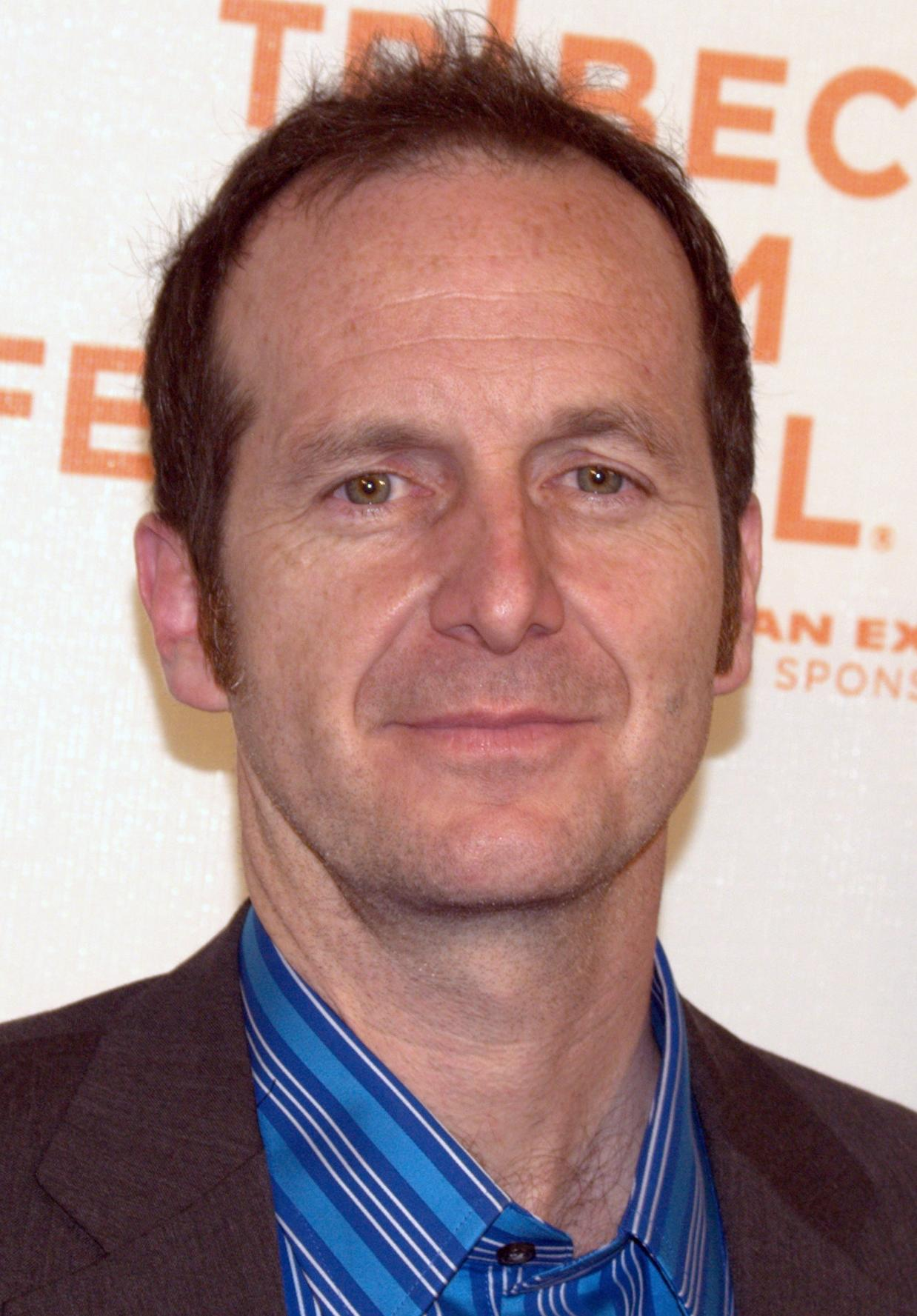
Denis O'Hare

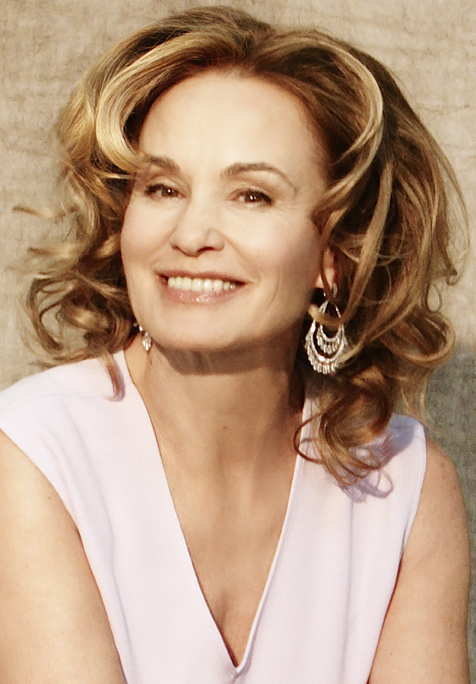
Jessica Lange

- Connie Britton as Vivien Harmon
- Dylan McDermott as Ben Harmon
- Evan Peters as Tate Langdon
- Taissa Farmiga as Violet Harmon
- Denis O'Hare as Lawrence "Larry" Harvey
- Jessica Lange as Constance Langdon

=== Special guest stars ===
- Kate Mara as Hayden McClaine
- Zachary Quinto as Chad Warwick
- Charles S. Dutton as Detective Granger
- Eric Stonestreet as Derrick

=== Recurring ===
- Frances Conroy as Moira O'Hara
- Lily Rabe as Nora Montgomery
- Matt Ross as Dr. Charles Montgomery
- Jamie Brewer as Adelaide "Addie" Langdon
- Morris Chestnut as Luke Maxcy
- Christine Estabrook as Marcy the Realtor
- Alexandra Breckenridge as Young Moira O'Hara
- Sarah Paulson as Billie Dean Howard
- Celia Finkelstein as Nurse Gladys
- Michael Graziadei as Travis Wanderley
- Rosa Salazar as Nurse Maria
- Teddy Sears as Patrick
- Sam Kinsey as Beauregard "Beau" Langdon
- Rebecca Wisocky as Lorraine Harvey

=== Guest stars ===
- Adina Porter as Sally Freeman
- Christian Serratos as Becca
- Eric Close as Hugo Langdon
- Malaya Rivera Drew as Detective Barrios
- Brando Eaton as Kyle Greenwell
- Alexander Nimetz as Amir Stanley
- Ashley Rickards as Chloe Stapleton
- Mena Suvari as Elizabeth Short
- Alessandra Torresani as Stephanie Boggs
- Ben Woolf as Thaddeus Montgomery / The Infantata

== Episodes ==
No. overall	No. in season	Title	Directed by	Written by	Original release date	Prod. code	US viewers (millions)
1	1	"Pilot"	Ryan Murphy	Ryan Murphy & Brad Falchuk	October 5, 2011	1ATS79	3.18
The Harmon family moves from Boston to Los Angeles to recover from mother Vivien's miscarriage and father Ben's infidelity with one of his students. Their daughter Violet starts at a new school, only to be terrorized by a group of girls. The family deals with intrusive neighbors Constance and her daughter, Addie, who has Down syndrome, along with Larry, a previous homeowner with a heavily scarred face who set fire to his entire family. Ben, a psychiatrist, sees patients in his home; one of them, a possibly psychotic boy named Tate, becomes friends with Violet. Vivien rehires the house's former housekeeper, the elderly Moira, who appears to Ben as a young, seductive maid. Ben and Vivien eventually have sex, once after a fight, and later while she thinks he has dressed up in a bondage suit. She later tells Ben she's pregnant.
2	2	"Home Invasion"	Alfonso Gomez-Rejon	Ryan Murphy & Brad Falchuk	October 12, 2011	1ATS01	2.46
After meeting with a new patient, Bianca, Ben receives a call from his ex-mistress, Hayden, who tells him she's pregnant and needs his support for an abortion. Ben lies to Vivien to resolve his past. A trio of serial killer enthusiasts led by Bianca break into the house to re-enact the brutal murders of two nursing students that occurred in the house in 1968. Vivien and Violet are the intended victims, but they escape their captors, who become lost in the house. Tate and the ghosts of the house dispatch the intruders. Upon hearing of what happened, Ben leaves Hayden at the clinic and rushes home. Vivien tells him that they are selling the house.
3	3	"Murder House"	Bradley Buecker	Jennifer Salt	October 19, 2011	1ATS02	2.59
The Harmons' finances take a blow, making moving impractical. Hayden surprises Ben by appearing at his doorstep, telling him she is keeping the baby, moving close to him, and determined to continue their affair. Vivien learns about the house's original owners, crazed surgeon Charles Montgomery, and his wife, Nora, who provided illegal abortions in their basement until their bitter marriage ended in murder. After spotting blood, Vivien is told by her doctor that the baby is fine. Ben passes out, and the doctor informs him that he found traces of an opiate that causes memory loss. Ben confronts Moira, who has been trying to seduce him, about drugging his coffee. Hayden shows up again, frantic that Ben has ignored her. As he takes her outside to calm her down, Larry kills her with a shovel to help Ben, who becomes distraught. Larry convinces him that getting rid of the body is the best option. Larry digs a hole, discovering Moira's remains, but buries Hayden over them. Constance tells Moira that she's now stuck in the house forever.
4	4	"Halloween"	David Semel	James Wong	October 26, 2011	1ATS03	2.96
5	5	"Halloween"	David Semel	Tim Minear	November 2, 2011	1ATS04	2.74
The Harmons hire interior designers to makeover the house to help it sell, mistaking the arriving Chad and his partner Patrick for the designers. Unknown to the Harmons, the couple are the former owners killed by the Rubber Man in the house one year ago. Violet demands Tate tell her what is in the basement. Tate says it is the still-living abomination created when Dr. Montgomery, driven insane, tried to bring his dismembered child back to life by sewing the pieces together with various animal parts. Vivien confronts Ben about phone calls from Hayden, who swears that Hayden is gone. The baby begins kicking, an impossibility at eight weeks. At the hospital, an ultrasound reveals that the baby is more developed than it should be; the ultrasound technician collapses after seeing the baby onscreen. While trick-or-treating, Addie is fatally hit by a car, and Constance attempts to get her to the Harmons' lawn before she dies, but fails. Violet is alone in the house when Larry arrives, and the Rubber Man appears behind her. The Harmons return from the hospital to find the house broken into and Violet missing. Ben answers a knock at the door and finds Hayden's ghost standing there, covered in dirt. The Rubber Man disappears, and Tate appears. He and Violet go on their date to the beach, and Tate tells her high school was terrible for him. Five mangled, bloody teens appear and harass Tate, prompting the couple to leave. Vivien tells Ben that Hayden is in the house. Ben finds her in the basement, but Larry knocks him out with the shovel and ties him up. He is freed by Nora, who urges him to save his child. Hayden appears to Vivien, and both are shocked to learn that the other is pregnant with Ben's child. Hayden attacks her, but is stopped by Ben, who is forced to admit that he impregnated Hayden months after Vivien discovered the affair. Afterward, Hayden is arrested. The teens find Tate and Violet, but Tate protects Violet by making them chase him. Constance takes Violet to her house, revealing that Addie is dead and Tate is her son. The teens are revealed to be ghosts from various cliques at Westfield High who were killed in a school shooting committed by Tate in 1994. The ghosts angrily demand to know why he killed them and that he admit what he did, but Tate cannot remember anything about them. Two of the ghosts, one a football player and the other a cheerleader, asked why he "targeted jocks" (a likely reference to the Columbine Massacre). With Halloween night ending, the teens depart. The other ghosts, including Moira, Chad, Patrick, and Nora, warily return to the house. Ben packs and sadly leaves the house.
6	6	"Piggy Piggy"	Michael Uppendahl	Jessica Sharzer	November 9, 2011	1ATS05	2.83
After Violet confirms online that Tate was shot in his bedroom by a SWAT team after his massacre at Westfield High, Constance introduces her to a medium, Billie Dean, and she and Constance explain that Tate is unaware he is dead. Constance has been sending him to Ben, hoping a breakthrough will help him pass on, and they need Violet's help, though the revelation shakes Violet. Ben needs to use the house for his therapy sessions to earn money, and Vivien agrees out of necessity. Ben sees a new patient, Derek, who is terrified by urban legends, most recently the legend of the "Piggy Man," who will slaughter anyone who repeats a specific mantra in the mirror. Ben begins noticing that Vivien has developed an attraction to the security officer. Vivien contacts the ultrasound technician who fainted during the ultrasound and has since quit her job, and she claims she saw that the baby was the Antichrist. Taking Ben's advice to face his fear, Derek repeats the mantra in his bathroom mirror, but is ironically shot and killed by a masked, armed robber. Violet tries to confront Tate, but is mobbed by the other ghosts. Overwhelmed, she attempts suicide, but Tate saves her. Tate tearfully confesses that he loves her. He plans to leave her alone, but she comforts him.
7	7	"Open House"	Tim Hunter	Brad Falchuk	November 16, 2011	1ATS06	3.06
In 1994, Larry, in love with Constance, mercy-kills her deformed son, Beau, who lives chained in the attic, at Constance's request upon learning that Beau would be taken away from her due to her neglectful parenting. In the present, Violet takes solace in Tate, who says he is aware of the ghosts and that they will not harm her if she tells them to leave her alone. He shows her old photographs he found of the house and the Montgomerys. Vivien learns she is pregnant with twins. Resolving to be upfront with prospective buyers about the house's past, she learns of the Montgomerys and that Charles revived their son as a monster, causing Nora to go insane and kill him and herself. Ben finds Larry's home and confronts him, learning that Larry wants the house so he can be with Constance. Violet shares the photos of the Montgomerys with Vivien, who is shocked to find that she recognizes Nora as one of the interested buyers from Episode 3.
8	8	"Rubber Man"	Miguel Arteta	Ryan Murphy	November 23, 2011	1ATS07	2.81
Tate is revealed to be the Rubber Man, who attempted to provide the distraught Nora with a baby. The outfit is a fetish suit Chad bought in hopes of reigniting his and Patrick's failing relationship. Tate donned the suit and killed Patrick and Chad after they decided not to have a baby, hoping that a new family would move in and have a child which could be given to Nora. In the present, Hayden conspires with Nora to drive Vivien insane so that they can have her twins. Vivien and Violet are confronted by the ghostly house intruders from Episode 2. Ben believes Vivien is mentally unstable because the police found no evidence of the intruders' presence, and Violet lied about what she saw. He prohibits Vivien from leaving, believing that she is trying to take Violet and the twins away from him. Vivien steals Marcy's handgun for protection. Hayden convinces Tate, as the Rubber Man, to attack Vivien, revealing that Tate fathered one of Vivien's twins. During the attack, Vivien accidentally shoots Ben, who is convinced that she is a danger to herself and others. Vivien's reaction to another poltergeist results in the police taking her away. Chad and Patrick's murder is shown in its entirety, revealing that after Tate immobilized them, Moira gave Tate the couple's gun, which Tate used to stage their deaths as a murder/suicide.
9	9	"Spooky Little Girl"	John Scott	Jennifer Salt	November 30, 2011	1ATS08	2.85
The events of the famous 1940s Black Dahlia case are depicted, in which a dentist raped Elizabeth Short while she was under anesthesia, only to find he had administered too much and she had died. The ghost of Charles Montgomery dismembers her corpse. In the present, Elizabeth's ghost appears to Ben, seeking his psychiatric help. Ben receives a call from Vivien's OB/GYN telling him that Vivien's twins have separate fathers – him and someone else. He accuses Vivien of cheating on him. Hayden tells him that she saw Vivien and Luke, the security guard, growing closer. Ben confronts Luke about the possible paternity and learns that Luke is sterile. After Constance and Travis get into a domestic dispute, Travis has sex with Hayden in the Harmon house. Hayden kills him, and Larry, who "owes her a favor," takes Travis's body and dumps it in public in the Black Dahlia tradition. Ben finds the Rubber Man's mask and realizes the possibility that Vivien was raped. Moira tells Constance that Tate is the other father. She asks Billie Dean what would happen if a ghost sires a living child. The medium tells her of the Pope's knowledge of such an event as the beginning of the Apocalypse by the Antichrist.
10	10	"Smoldering Children"	Michael Lehmann	James Wong	December 7, 2011	1ATS09	2.54
It is revealed that Tate caused Larry's scars by setting him on fire on the morning of the school shooting. The police tell Constance of Travis' murder, and her behavior causes them to suspect her as his killer. Ben learns that Violet has not been seen in school in over two weeks and notices a blowfly infestation in the house. Ben calls an exterminator to deal with the infestation, which results in Tate killing the exterminator while he investigates the crawl space beneath the house. Ben and Violet argue about her school attendance, and she reluctantly agrees to return on the condition that she can change schools. Ben checks out boarding schools for Violet, and upon hearing this, Tate takes measures to keep her around, ending in showing Violet her corpse in the house's crawl space – Violet had died from her suicide attempt in episode 6, despite Tate's attempts to save her. In an act of penance for his crimes, Larry confesses to the murder of Travis after meeting the ghosts of his wife and two daughters for the first time. Ben learns that Tate is the Rubber Man and the other one who impregnated Vivien.
11	11	"Birth"	Alfonso Gomez-Rejon	Tim Minear	December 14, 2011	1ATS10	2.59
Ben goes to pick up Vivien at the sanitarium, intent on taking Violet with him. However, Violet, as a ghost, is trapped on the property. He takes Vivien home to pick up Violet as Vivien insists on going to her sister's in Florida. While waiting in the car, Vivien begins to have labor pains. Violet tries to explain to her father that she is dead. Constance brings Vivien into the house and gets "help" to assist in the delivery – the ghosts of Dr. Charles Montgomery and the 1968 nurses. As Vivien goes into labor, Chad tells Violet that Tate was the one who sired one of the twins. Vivien has great difficulty giving birth to the babies, losing one to stillbirth while the other causes her to bleed internally. Violet appears to comfort her mother and asks her to "come be with her." Vivien dies, and Violet confronts Tate, telling him she loves him but can never forgive him. Tate tearfully begs for forgiveness, but she screams for him to go away, and he does. Vivien appears and comforts her daughter in the afterlife.
12	12	"Afterbirth"	Bradley Buecker	Jessica Sharzer	December 21, 2011	1ATS11	3.22
Ben, feeling alone, plans to commit suicide, but the ghosts of Violet and Vivien encourage him to take the living twin and get out of the house. During his attempt, he is killed by Hayden and the home-invader ghosts, hanged from the chandelier; Constance takes the living twin. Moira and the other "innocent" ghosts help the Harmon ghosts prevent the deaths of further tenants by scaring away the first family that wants to move in, the Ramoses. Tate, feeling alienated, tries to kill the Ramos son so that Violet won't be alone. She prevents this by distracting Tate. Nora, who wants a child since hers was murdered and turned evil, relinquishes motherhood of the dead Harmon twin to Vivien, who asks Moira to be its godmother. The Harmons and Moira decorate the house for Christmas, while Tate tells Hayden he will wait "forever" for Violet. Three years later, Constance comes home and sees a trail of blood on the floor, leading to the bedroom of the living Harmon twin, now about three years old and looking much like Tate. He has murdered his nanny and is sitting in a rocking chair, smiling up at Constance.

== Production ==
=== Conception ===
What you saw in the finale was the end of the Harmon house. The second season of the show will be a brand-new home or building to haunt. Just like this year every season of this show will have a beginning, middle and end. [The second season] won't be in L.A. It will obviously be in America, but in a completely different locale.

— Murphy on American Horror Story's second season.

Creators Murphy and Falchuk began working on American Horror Story before their Fox series Glee began production. Murphy wanted to do the opposite of what he had done previously and thus began his work on the series. He stated, "I went from Nip/Tuck to Glee, so it made sense that I wanted to do something challenging and dark. And I always had loved, as Brad had, the horror genre. So it just was a natural for me." Falchuk was intrigued by the idea of putting a different angle on the horror genre, stating that their main goal in creating the series was to scare viewers. "You want people to be a little bit off balance afterward," he said.

The dark tone of the series is modeled after the ABC soap opera Dark Shadows, which Murphy's grandmother forced him to watch when he was younger to toughen him up. He also cited Rosemary's Baby, Don't Look Now, The Amityville Horror, and Stanley Kubrick's version of The Shining as influences for the series.

Murphy and Falchuk planned that each season of the series would tell a different story from the beginning. After the first-season finale aired, Murphy spoke of his plans to change the cast and location for the second season, while retaining some actors from the first: "The people that are coming back will be playing completely different characters, creatures, monsters, etc. [The Harmons'] stories are done."

In February 2011, FX officially announced that it had ordered a pilot for a possible series from Ryan Murphy and Brad Falchuk, with both Murphy and Falchuk writing and Murphy directing. Dante Di Loreto was announced as executive producer. Production on the series began in April 2011. In July 2011, FX officially announced the project had been given a series order consisting of 13 episodes. In August 2011, it was announced that Tim Minear, Jennifer Salt, James Wong, and Jessica Sharzer had joined the series as writers.

=== Crossover with Coven (AHS: Apocalypse) ===
On October 30, 2016, Murphy announced that a future crossover season of the series would continue the Murder House and Coven stories, merging their characters and themes. He did not state which season it would be but that he had already reached out to actors from both seasons to reprise their respective roles. Murphy later confirmed one of the Murder House characters would be moved in the season finale of Coven. However, on January 5, 2018, it was initially announced that the crossover season would be taking place in the ninth season. Still, on June 14, 2018, the crossover was moved to the eighth season, titled Apocalypse.

=== Casting ===
Casting announcements began in March 2011, with Connie Britton first to be cast, portraying female lead Vivien Harmon. Britton stated that she took a risk in taking the role of Vivien. When Murphy presented the role to her, he said, "This is something we've never seen you do before. It will be turning what you've just been doing on its ear." She was intrigued by what he had presented her and ultimately decided to take the part. In an interview with Entertainment Weekly, series co-creator Ryan Murphy stated that he had told Connie Britton, early on, that her character Vivien would die in the first season. "We've really had the whole season mapped out from the beginning," he said. "In the meetings with the core actors, the three leads being Connie, Dylan [McDermott] and Jessica [Lange], as we tried to snare them, we were able to say this is where you start, this is the middle, and this is where you end up. So, yes, I was able to tell Connie really the whole run of the series."

Denis O'Hare joined the cast in late March 2011 as Larry Harvey. Jessica Lange joined the cast in April 2011 as Constance, marking her first regular role on television. Lange was attracted to the role because it didn't require a 22-episode commitment like a series on a broadcast network. "That was huge for me!" she said. "I wasn't about to commit to, you know, six months. It was cable, rather than network... I've been offered network [shows] before, and determined not to do it, just because I can't make that kind of time commitment."

Dylan McDermott was cast as the lead Ben Harmon in late April 2011. His character was initially described as "a handsome and masculine but sensitive therapist who loves his family but has hurt his wife." McDermott stated that he wanted to do the role to break away from his previous role as Bobby Donnell in the ABC series The Practice. "This was exactly why I wanted to do this show – to change it up and do a different kind of character. People think of me as the guy from The Practice... I wanted to turn that [notion] on its head, and hopefully, I'm doing that [with this show]", he said.

In May 2011, Taissa Farmiga and Evan Peters were the last lead actors to be cast, portraying Violet Harmon and Tate Langdon, respectively. Farmiga said that she loved Violet "immediately" and that "she had spunk to her, she had attitude." Murphy has described Tate as the "true monster" of the series, adding, "To Evan's great credit and the credit of the writers, I think Evan's done an amazingly difficult job making a monster sympathetic."

=== Filming ===
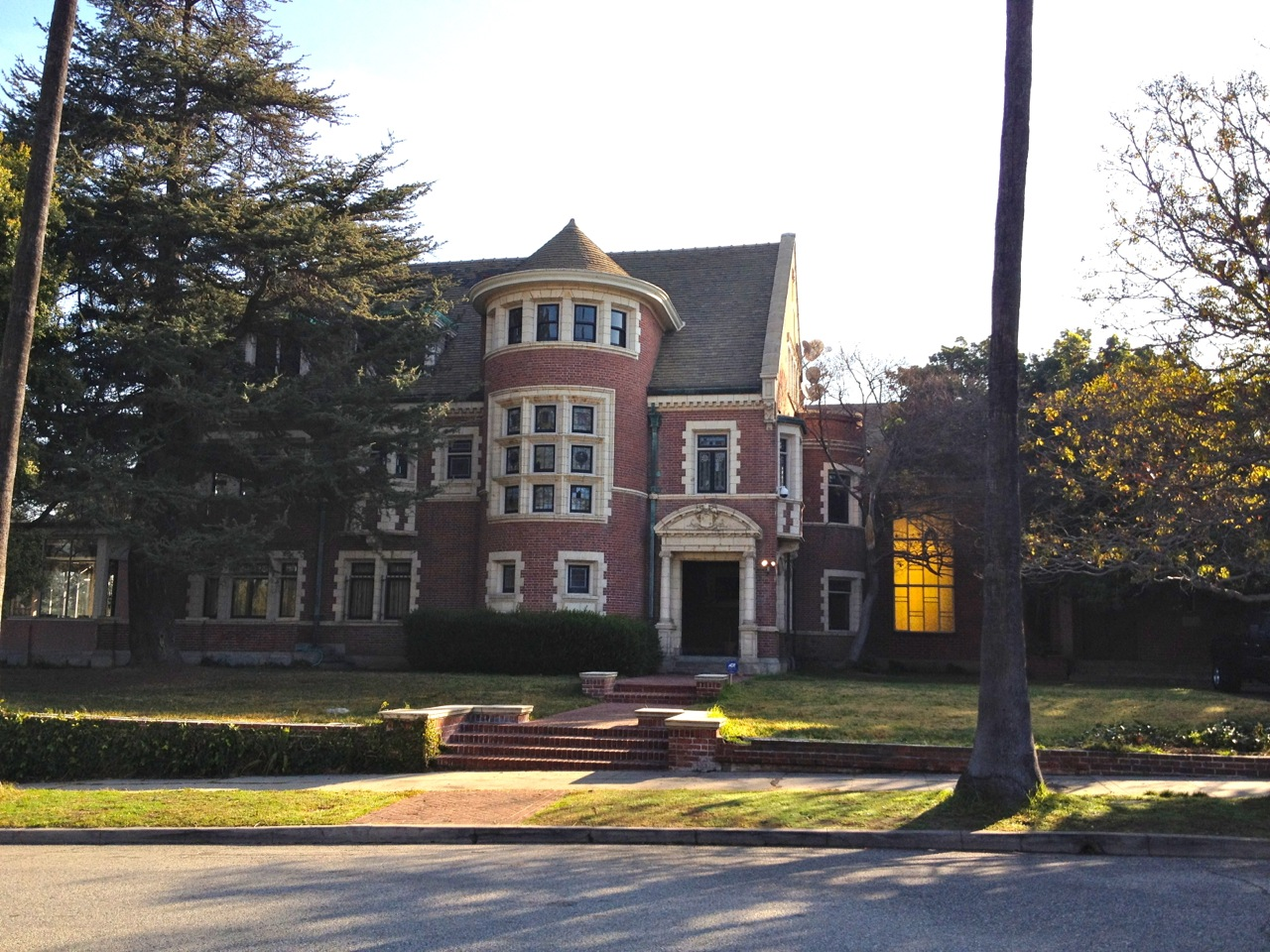
Murphy was looking for a house that could be appropriately creepy but also attractive.

Production and shooting for the first season began on July 27, 2011. The pilot episode was shot on location in a house in Country Club Park, Los Angeles, California, which serves as the haunted house and crime scene in the series. Designed and built in 1902 by Alfred Rosenheim, the president of the American Institute of Architects' Los Angeles chapter, the Tudor or Collegiate Gothic-style single-family home was previously used as a convent. An adjoining chapel was removed from exterior shots using CGI.

The series is filmed on sets that are an exact replica of the house. Details such as Louis Comfort Tiffany stained glass windows, and hammered bronze light fixtures, were re-created to preserve the look of the house. The house became available for rent on Airbnb for six months, beginning February 2016, before being unlisted.

Due to a "very aggressive" production schedule and the series' pilot shoot having to wait for co-creators Ryan Murphy and Brad Falchuk's other show, Glee, to wrap its second season production, it was announced that the show's first-season finale, the thirteenth episode, would be thirty minutes shorter than planned. Finally, the thirteenth episode was dropped and they made the twelfth episode 10 minutes longer (52 minutes). The finale aired on December 21, 2011.

=== Title sequence ===
The opening title sequence was created by Kyle Cooper and his company Prologue. He also created the title sequence for the AMC series The Walking Dead and the 1995 film Se7en. The theme music was composed by sound designer Cesar Davila-Irizarry and musician Charlie Clouser. The sequence is set in the Harmons' basement and includes images of postmortem young children, unborn (or aborted) babies in jars, skulls, a christening dress, a nurse's uniform, and a figure holding a pair of bloody hedge clippers. Murphy described the sequence as a mini-mystery and stated, "By the time you see the ninth episode of this season, every image in that title sequence will be explained."

== Release ==
=== Home media ===
American Horror Story – The Complete First Season
Set Details		Special Features
12 Episodes; 4 Disc Set (DVD); 3 Disc Set (BD); English 5.1 Dolby Digital; Subtitles: English SDH, Spanish, French; Runtime: 533 Minutes		Audio Commentary on the Pilot Episode; The Murder House presented by Eternal Darkness Tours of Hollywood; Behind the Fright: The Making of American Horror Story; Overture to Horror: Creating the Title Sequence; Out of the Shadows: Meet the House Ghosts
Release Dates
Region 1	Region 2	Region 4
September 25, 2012	October 15, 2012	October 19, 2012

== Reception ==
=== Critical response ===
American Horror Story: Murder House received positive reviews. Metacritic reported a weighted score of 65 out of 100 on based on 164 reviews. The review aggregation website Rotten Tomatoes reported a 72% approval rating with an average rating of 6.55/10 based on 148 reviews. The website's consensus reads, "Convoluted yet effective, American Horror Story is strange, gory, and twisted enough to keep viewers hooked." Ken Tucker from Entertainment Weekly awarded the pilot episode a B+, stating, "AHS is pretty much all scare, all the time: a whole lotta screams, sex, jolts, mashed faces, psychotic behavior, and dead babies."

Chuck Barney of the San Jose Mercury News said, "Most TV shows, after all, quickly fade from memory. This one will haunt your dreams." Hank Stuever from The Washington Post said in his review, "Overdoing things is one of Murphy's trademark flaws, but this show has a captivating style and giddy gross-outs." The New York Times' Mike Hale called the show "a more classically minded chiller", taking into mind the success of HBO's True Blood and AMC's The Walking Dead. However, not all reviews were favorable. Alan Sepinwall of HitFix gave the series a D−, saying, "It is so far over the top that the top is a microscopic speck in its rearview mirror."

American Horror Story season 1: Critical reception by episode
Season 1 (2011): Percentage of positive critics' reviews tracked by the website Rotten Tomatoes

=== Ratings ===
The pilot episode gained a 1.6 ratings share among adults aged 18–49 and garnered 3.2 million viewers, and totalled 5.2 million between two airings. These were the best numbers FX had ever received for a series premiere. Taken together with equally strong numbers for the station's returning original series – Sons of Anarchy, It's Always Sunny in Philadelphia and The League – the episode helped make October the most-watched month on FX ever. The episode was seen by 3.2 million viewers total in 59 countries.

Ratings increased as the season progressed, with the fourth episode receiving a 1.7 ratings share among adults 18–49, a tenth of a point higher than the pilot episode. The seventh episode had a viewership of 3.06 million, receiving a 1.8 ratings share in the 18–49 demographic; a series high. The season finale was watched by 3.22 million viewers and received a 1.7 ratings share in the 18–49 demographic. The first season tied with the TNT series Falling Skies as the biggest new cable series of the year among adults 18–49.

American Horror Story's November 2011 international premiere across Europe and Latin America, on Fox International Channels, drew rankings of 1st or 2nd among all Pay-TV in most metered markets for its time slot. In the UK, it premiered on non-terrestrial channel FX, with 128,200 viewers. The second episode saw an increase of 27%, receiving an overall viewership of 158,700.

Nielsen Media Research, which records streaming viewership on certain U.S. television screens, reported that American Horror Story: Murder House garnered 1.15 billion minutes of watch time, averaging 95.6 million minutes viewed per episode, between May 1, 2024, and August 31, 2026.

== Awards and nominations ==
In its first season, American Horror Story was nominated for 65 awards and won 19.

Year	Association	Category	Nominated work	Result
2011	IGN's Best of 2011: TV	Best Sci-Fi/Horror Series	American Horror Story	Won
2011	16th Satellite Awards	Best TV Series – Genre	American Horror Story	Won
2011	16th Satellite Awards	Special Achievement Award: Outstanding Performance in a TV Series	Jessica Lange	Won
2012	18th Screen Actors Guild Awards	Outstanding Performance by a Female Actor in a Drama Series	Jessica Lange	Won
2012	3rd Dorian Awards	TV Performance of the Year	Jessica Lange	Won
2012	3rd Dorian Awards	TV Drama of the Year	American Horror Story	Won
2012	3rd Dorian Awards	LGBT-Themed TV Show of the Year	American Horror Story	Nominated
2012	3rd Dorian Awards	Campy TV Show of the Year	American Horror Story	Nominated
2012	Bram Stoker Award 2011	Best Screenplay	Jessica Sharzer (for "Afterbirth")	Won
2012	38th Saturn Awards	Best Actress on TV	Jessica Lange	Nominated
2012	38th Saturn Awards	Best Actor on TV	Dylan McDermott	Nominated
2012	38th Saturn Awards	Best Supporting Actress on TV	Frances Conroy	Nominated
2012	38th Saturn Awards	Best Guest Performer on TV	Zachary Quinto	Nominated
2012	38th Saturn Awards	Best Syndicated/Cable TV Series	American Horror Story	Nominated
2012	2nd Critics' Choice TV Awards	Best Movie or Miniseries	American Horror Story	Nominated
2012	2nd Critics' Choice TV Awards	Best Actress in a Movie or Miniseries	Jessica Lange	Nominated
2012	64th Primetime Emmy Awards	Outstanding Supporting Actress in a Miniseries or Movie	Jessica Lange	Won
2012	64th Primetime Emmy Awards	Outstanding Supporting Actress in a Miniseries or Movie	Frances Conroy	Nominated
2012	64th Primetime Emmy Awards	Outstanding Lead Actress in a Miniseries or Movie	Connie Britton	Nominated
2012	64th Primetime Emmy Awards	Outstanding Supporting Actor in a Miniseries or Movie	Denis O'Hare	Nominated
2012	64th Primetime Emmy Awards	Outstanding Miniseries or Movie*	American Horror Story	Nominated
2012	64th Primetime Creative Arts Emmy Awards	Outstanding Art Direction for a Miniseries or Movie	Mark Worthington, Edward L. Rubin, Ellen Brill (for "Open House")	Nominated
2012	64th Primetime Creative Arts Emmy Awards	Outstanding Art Direction for a Miniseries or Movie	Beth Rubino, Charles M. Lagola, Ellen Brill (for "Pilot")	Nominated
2012	64th Primetime Creative Arts Emmy Awards	Outstanding Casting for a Miniseries, Movie, or Special	Robert J. Ulrich, Eric Dawson	Nominated
2012	64th Primetime Creative Arts Emmy Awards	Outstanding Costumes for a Miniseries, Movie, or Special	Chrisi Karvonides, Conan Castro (for "Halloween (Part 1)")	Nominated
2012	64th Primetime Creative Arts Emmy Awards	Outstanding Single-Camera Picture Editing for a Miniseries or Movie	Fabienne Bouville (for "Birth")	Nominated
2012	64th Primetime Creative Arts Emmy Awards	Outstanding Hairstyling for a Miniseries or Movie	Monte C. Haught, Samantha Wade, Melanie Verkins, Natalie Driscoll, Michelle Ceglia	Won
2012	64th Primetime Creative Arts Emmy Awards	Outstanding Main Title Design	Kyle Cooper, Juan Ruiz Anchia, Gabriel Diaz, Ryan Murphy	Nominated
2012	64th Primetime Creative Arts Emmy Awards	Outstanding Make-up for a Miniseries or Movie (Non-Prosthetic)	Eryn Krueger Mekash, Kim Ayers, Silvina Knight, D. Garen Tolkin	Nominated
2012	64th Primetime Creative Arts Emmy Awards	Outstanding Prosthetic Make-up for a Series, Miniseries, Movie, or Special	Eryn Krueger Mekash, Hiroshi Yada, Michael Mekash, Christopher Nelson, Kim Ayers, Christien Tinsley, Jason Hamer	Nominated
2012	64th Primetime Creative Arts Emmy Awards	Outstanding Sound Editing for a Miniseries, Movie, or Special	Gary Megregian, David Klotz, Steve M. Stuhr, Jason Krane, Jason Lezama, Timothy Cleveland, Bruce Tanis, Simon Coke, Zane Bruce, Jeff Gunn, Lance Wiseman (for "Piggy Piggy")	Nominated
2012	64th Primetime Creative Arts Emmy Awards	Outstanding Sound Mixing for a Miniseries or Movie	Sean Rush, Joe Earle, Doug Andham (for "Piggy Piggy")	Nominated
2012	64th Primetime Creative Arts Emmy Awards	Outstanding Stunt Coordination	Tim Davison	Nominated
2012	69th Golden Globe Awards	Best Supporting Actress in a Series, Miniseries, or TV Film	Jessica Lange	Won
2012	69th Golden Globe Awards	Best TV Series – Drama	American Horror Story	Nominated
2012	5th Kerrang! Awards	Best TV Show	American Horror Story	Nominated
2012	16th Online Film & Television Association Awards	Best Drama Series	American Horror Story	Nominated
2012	16th Online Film & Television Association Awards	Best Ensemble in a Drama Series	American Horror Story	Nominated
2012	16th Online Film & Television Association Awards	Best Direction in a Drama Series	American Horror Story	Won
2012	16th Online Film & Television Association Awards	Best Writing in a Drama Series	American Horror Story	Nominated
2012	16th Online Film & Television Association Awards	Best Music in a Series	American Horror Story	Won
2012	16th Online Film & Television Association Awards	Best Sound in a Series	American Horror Story	Nominated
2012	16th Online Film & Television Association Awards	Best Editing in a Series	American Horror Story	Won
2012	16th Online Film & Television Association Awards	Best Cinematography in a Series	American Horror Story	Nominated
2012	16th Online Film & Television Association Awards	Best Production Design in a Series	American Horror Story	Nominated
2012	16th Online Film & Television Association Awards	Best Costume Design in a Series	American Horror Story	Nominated
2012	16th Online Film & Television Association Awards	Best Makeup/Hairstyling in a Series	American Horror Story	Nominated
2012	16th Online Film & Television Association Awards	Best Visual Effects in a Series	American Horror Story	Won
2012	16th Online Film & Television Association Awards	Best New Theme Song in a Series	American Horror Story	Won
2012	16th Online Film & Television Association Awards	Best New Titles Sequence	American Horror Story	Won
2012	16th Online Film & Television Association Awards	Best Supporting Actress in a Drama Series	Jessica Lange	Nominated
2012	16th ADG Excellence in Production Design Awards	One-Hour Single Camera TV Series	Mark Worthington (for "Murder House")	Nominated
2012	28th Artios Awards	TV movie or Miniseries	Robert J. Ulrich, Eric Dawson, Carol Kritzer, Eric Souliere (Associate)	Nominated
2012	28th TCA Awards	Individual Achievement in Drama	Jessica Lange	Nominated
2012	TV Guide Awards 2012	Favorite Villain	Jessica Lange (as Constance Langdon)	Nominated
2012	TV Guide Awards 2012	Favorite Horror Series	American Horror Story	Nominated
2012	1st PAAFTJ TV Awards	Best Miniseries or TV Movie	American Horror Story	Nominated
2012	1st PAAFTJ TV Awards	Best Main Title Design	American Horror Story	Nominated
2012	1st PAAFTJ TV Awards	Best Directing for a Miniseries or TV Movie	Ryan Murphy	Won
2012	1st PAAFTJ TV Awards	Best Supporting Actress in a Miniseries or TV Movie	Jessica Lange	Won
2012	1st PAAFTJ TV Awards	Best Cast in a Miniseries or TV Movie	Dylan McDermott, Connie Britton, Taissa Farmiga, Jessica Lange, Evan Peters, Denis O'Hare	Nominated
2012	1st PAAFTJ TV Awards	Best Production Design in a Miniseries or TV Movie	Mark Worthington	Won
2012	1st PAAFTJ TV Awards	Best Cinematography in a Miniseries or TV Movie	Mark Worthington	Nominated
2012	5th NewNowNext Awards	Cause You're Hot	Jessica Lange	Nominated
2013	24th PGA Awards	Outstanding Producer of Long-Form TV	Brad Buecker, Dante Di Loreto, Brad Falchuk, Ryan Murphy, Chip Vucelich, Alexis Martin Woodall	Nominated

* The FX network submitted the series to the Academy of Television Arts & Sciences in the miniseries, rather than the drama series, category for its 64th Primetime Emmy Awards.
