= Spooky Little Girl =

- American Horror Story episode
- Episode no.: Season 1 Episode 9
- Directed by: John Scott
- Written by: Jennifer Salt
- Production code: 1ATS08
- Original air date: November 30, 2011
- Running time: 40 minutes

Guest appearances
- Kate Mara as Hayden McClaine; Frances Conroy as Moira O'Hara; Alexandra Breckenridge as Young Moira; Matt Ross as Charles Montgomery; Sarah Paulson as Billie Dean Howard; Michael Graziadei as Travis Wanderley; Joshua Malina as Dr. David Curan; Eve Gordon as Dr. Hall; Geoffrey Rivas as Detective Jack Colquitt; April Grace as Nurse Naima; Tanya Clarke as Marla McClaine; Mena Suvari as Elizabeth Short; Morris Chestnut as Luke

Episode chronology
← Previous "Rubber Man"	Next → "Smoldering Children"
- American Horror Story: Murder House

"Spooky Little Girl" is the ninth episode of the first season of the television series American Horror Story, which premiered on the network FX on November 30, 2011. The episode was written by Jennifer Salt and was directed by John Scott. This episode is rated TV-MA (LSV).

In this episode, a famous murder victim visits the house while Constance (Jessica Lange) learns of Tate's (Evan Peters) bad behavior. Kate Mara guest stars as Hayden McClaine. Taissa Farmiga is absent in this episode.

== Plot ==
A flashback to 1947 shows a dentist, who lives and works out of the house, putting Elizabeth Short (Black Dahlia) under anesthesia and raping her, but accidentally kills her. Dr. Montgomery dismembers her and her remains are later found in a field.

A detective and Hayden's sister arrive at the house, believing Hayden has been murdered, but Hayden convinces them she's alive. Ben is told by a doctor that he is the father of only one of Vivien's twins. Ben walks in on young Moira and Elizabeth trying to seduce him and has enough; he fires Moira and throws Elizabeth out.

Believing that Vivien cheated on him, Ben visits her in the ward. Thinking she is asleep, he berates her over the supposed hypocrisy and says he will never help her leave. Ben later tells Hayden he never loved her. Heartbroken, she lies that Luke slept with Vivien.

Constance tries to make up with her younger boyfriend Travis and proposes to him, believing they can raise Tate's child together as a family. When he refuses, she mocks his dreams of becoming famous and he has sex with Hayden, who murders him. Travis' body is dismembered by Dr. Montgomery and taken away by Larry. His body is displayed in the same manner as Elizabeth's.

Constance, desiring the child, visits Vivien in the ward, expressing her support for her. Vivien confides in her that she was raped by the Rubber Man, but will pretend it was a hallucination in order to be discharged from the ward. Ben confronts Luke, the security officer Vivien employed, but learns that he is infertile and therefore could not be the father. As Moira leaves, Ben finds the Rubber Man mask and demands to know the truth, now realizing that Vivien is not crazy and was indeed raped. Moira congratulates him for finally starting to see the truth, appearing to him for the first time in her "true" elderly form.

Billie Dean Howard states to Constance that a child that is conceived between a ghost and a human is the Antichrist and will usher in the Apocalypse.

== Production ==
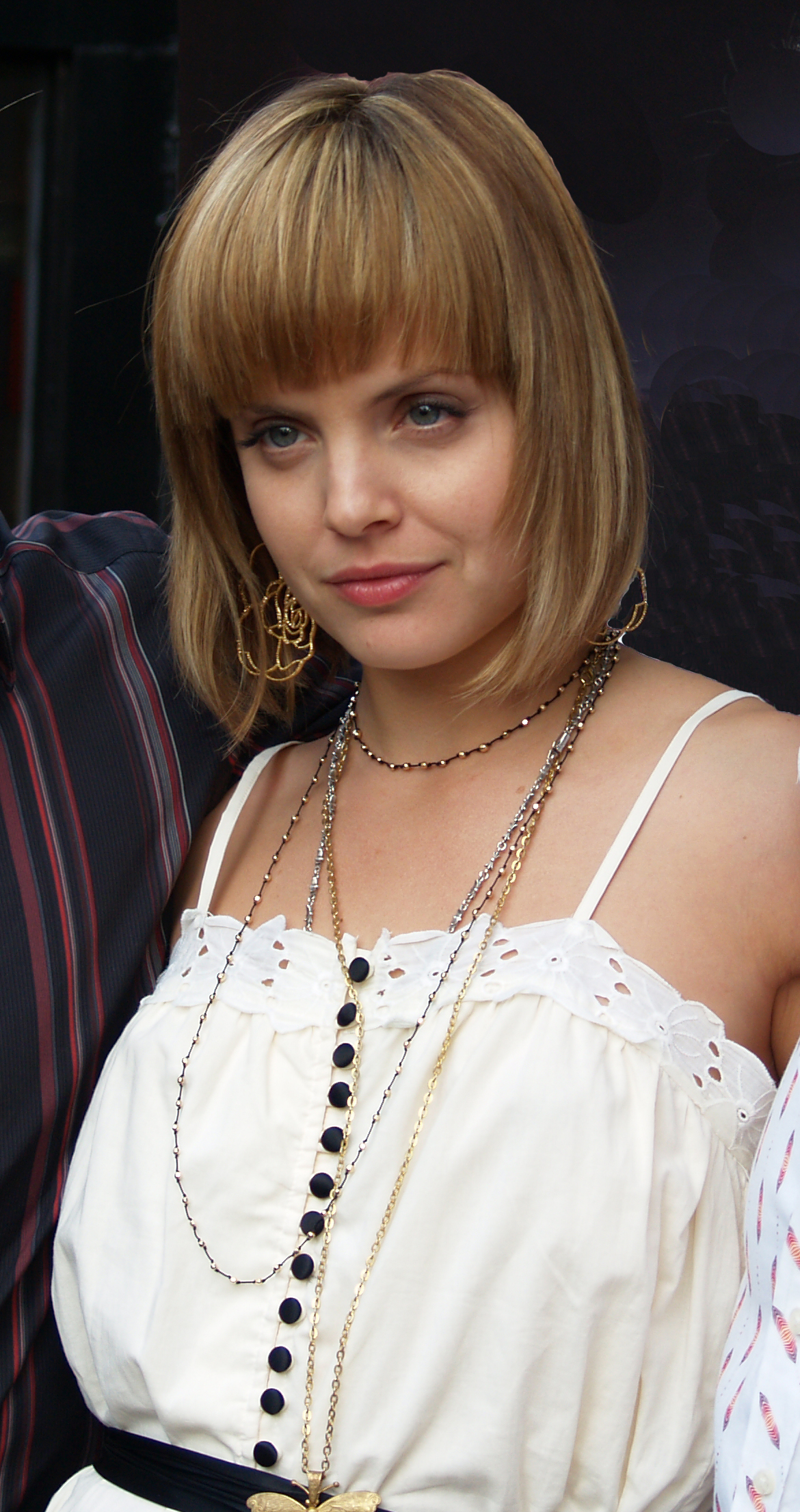
Mena Suvari portrays the Black Dahlia in the episode.

The episode was written by co-executive producer Jennifer Salt, and directed by John Scott.

About using the Black Dahlia storyline, series co-creator Ryan Murphy said he's always been interested in unsolved L.A. crimes. "The thing that fascinated me about the case is that there were more than 60 people who claimed credit for that murder," he said. "I've always been obsessed about that idea, that our culture [wants to know] what fame is about. Once I started researching the Black Dahlia for this episode, it made sense for me that she was killed in that house and I wanted to explore the '40s."

== Reception ==
Rotten Tomatoes reports an 73% approval rating, based on 11 reviews. Matt Richenthal of TV Fanatic commented on the bizarre events of the episode, "Nothing much happened on American Horror Story this week, except for an appearance by The Black Dahlia, a cameo by The Pope and the revelation that Vivien might be giving birth to the Antichrist, just your basic episode of the FX drama." The A.V. Club's Emily VanDerWerff said, "We learned a bunch of things that will likely be important going forward, but they were also things that didn't really matter... It's been a bit of a step down since that brain-eating episode. This episode was a step in the crazy direction."

In its original American broadcast, "Spooky Little Girl" was seen by an estimated 2.85 million household viewers and gained a 1.7 ratings share among adults aged 18–49, according to Nielsen Media Research. The episode was up one tenth from the previous episode.
