= Smoldering Children =

- American Horror Story episode
- Episode no.: Season 1 Episode 10
- Directed by: Michael Lehmann
- Written by: James Wong
- Production code: 1ATS09
- Original air date: December 7, 2011
- Running time: 42 minutes

Guest appearances
- Charles S. Dutton as Detective Granger; Michael Graziadei as Travis Wanderley; Jamie Brewer as Adelaide Langdon; Rebecca Wisocky as Lorraine Harvey; W. Earl Brown as Phil Critter; Malaya Rivera Drew as Detective Barrios; Derek Richardson as Harry Goodman; Gregory Sporleder as Peter McCormick

Episode chronology
← Previous "Spooky Little Girl"	Next → "Birth"
- American Horror Story: Murder House

"Smoldering Children" is the tenth episode of the first season of the American horror television series American Horror Story, which premiered on December 7, 2011, on the FX network. The episode was written by James Wong and directed by Michael Lehmann. With a rating of TV-MA (LV), this installment is intended for mature audiences only, due to its intense and disturbing content.

In this episode, the reason for Larry's (Denis O'Hare) burns are revealed, while Violet (Taissa Farmiga) learns a shocking truth. Charles S. Dutton guest stars as Detective Granger.

== Plot ==
In a flashback to 1994, the episode reveals the tragic events that unfolded in the Harmon house. Following the devastating loss of his family, Larry Harvey is left to grieve after his wife, Lorraine, takes her own life and that of their daughters. Constance, Tate, and Addie then move into the house with Larry. On Thanksgiving Day, tensions simmer as Tate lashes out at Larry, holding him responsible for the death of Beau and criticizing his blind trust in Constance. Tate's anger and resentment towards Constance are palpable. In a drug-fueled rage, Tate, under the influence of cocaine and crystal meth, confronts Larry in his office and sets him ablaze. This horrific act is followed by the infamous school shooting, as depicted in the "Piggy Piggy" episode.

Ben visits Vivien in the ward, and apologizes. He tells her he believes her claims that she was raped, and she will be discharged soon. He also tells her that the rapist fathered one of the twins.

Detectives tell Constance of Travis' murder, and she confronts Larry, believing he killed Travis out of jealousy. Larry says a ghost killed Travis in the house. Constance says she never loved him. A truant officer informs Ben that Violet has skipped school for sixteen days.

Detectives take Constance in for questioning over Travis' death. They mention the district attorney intended to charge her with the murder of her husband Hugo and Moira, but could not find the bodies.

Larry enters the house and sees his daughters and wife. He apologizes to Lorraine and swears to get revenge on Constance, but she tells him that he broke their wedding vows, not Constance.

Wearing the Rubber Man suit, Tate attacks Ben with chloroform. Ben fights him and pulls off his mask, seeing Tate's face before going unconscious. Tate tries to convince Violet to commit suicide. Violet flees, but is unable to leave the house. Tate shows Violet her decaying corpse; she did not survive a suicide attempt ("Piggy Piggy"). Tate has also known that he too was a ghost the entire time.

Constance learns that Larry has confessed to the murder. She visits him in jail, and he explains he confessed to pay for his sins, but will be able to handle his punishment if Constance will just say she loves him. Constance coldly refuses and leaves.

== Production ==
The episode was written by co-executive producer James Wong, while being directed by Michael Lehmann.

Taissa Farmiga, the actress who played Violet, had suspected her character's fate early on, picking up on subtle hints in the scripts. However, the show's creators kept her guessing, refusing to confirm her suspicions. Ryan Murphy, the series co-creator, had always planned for Violet's demise, but kept it a secret from the team. He intentionally wrote the suicide scene in Episode 6, "Piggy Piggy", to be ambiguous, leaving both the cast and audience wondering about Violet's fate. Murphy only revealed Violet's death to the other writers while they were writing Episode 8, "Rubber Man". Both Murphy and Farmiga described the scene revealing Violet's death as "emotional." Violet's decaying corpse was a prosthetic made from a mold of Farmiga's body. Farmiga had not seen the prosthetic until shooting; Murphy claims that Violet's reaction during the close up of the reveal is Farmiga's response to seeing herself dead for the first time.

Murphy sensed audience concerns that the previous two episodes, "Rubber Man" and "Spooky Little Girl", were straying from the main characters of the show, moving Vivien away from the house and introducing the character of The Black Dahlia. Thus, Murphy intended this and the remaining episodes to focus more on the Harmon family and the outcome of their experiences in the house.

== Reception ==
"Smoldering Children" received critical acclaim; Rotten Tomatoes reports a 100% approval rating, based on 8 reviews. The Star-Ledger's James Queally commented on the episode, saying, "Every week, I think I have American Horror Story figured out... the show sits down, shuts up, straps in and delivers an effective, character-driven story like "Smoldering Children"." The A.V. Club's Emily VanDerWerff said this about the episode, "I could make a number of complaints if pressed, since there were the usual dumb moments, character beats, and lines of dialogue, but... this was awesomely pulpy genre fun." She gave the episode an A grade. Matt Fowler from IGN gave the episode a rating of 8.5/10, citing it as "great."

In its original American broadcast, "Smoldering Children" was seen by an estimated 2.54 million household viewers and gained a 1.6 rating share among adults aged 18–49, according to Nielsen Media Research. The episode was down one tenth from the previous episode.
