= Halloween (American Horror Story) =

- American Horror Story episodes
- Episode nos.: Season 1 Episodes 4 & 5
- Directed by: David Semel
- Written by: James Wong (Part 1); Tim Minear (Part 2)
- Production codes: 1ATS03 (Part 1); 1ATS04 (Part 2)
- Original air dates: October 26, 2011 (Part 1); November 2, 2011 (Part 2)
- Running time: 39 minutes (Part 1); 41 minutes (Part 2)

Guest appearances
- Kate Mara as Hayden McClaine; Zachary Quinto as Chad Warwick; Frances Conroy as Moira O'Hara; Lily Rabe as Nora Montgomery; Matt Ross as Charles Montgomery; Christine Estabrook as Marcy; Jamie Brewer as Adelaide Langdon; Teddy Sears as Patrick; Michael Graziadei as Travis Wanderley; Brando Eaton as Kyle Greenwell; Ashley Rickards as Chloe Stapleton; Alessandra Torresani as Stephanie Boggs; Morris Chestnut as Luke

Episode chronology
← Previous "Murder House"	Next → "Piggy Piggy"
- American Horror Story: Murder House

"Halloween" is a two-part episode, consisting of the fourth and fifth episodes of the first season of the television series American Horror Story. The first part aired on October 26, 2011, and the second on November 2, 2011. Part 1 was written by James Wong and Part 2 was written by Tim Minear; both were directed by David Semel. Part 1 is rated TV-MA (LSV) and Part 2 is rated TV-MA (LV).

Part 1 was nominated for a Primetime Emmy Award for Outstanding Costumes for a Miniseries, Movie or Special.

In this two-part episode, the Harmons are visited by the former owners of the house and are given advice on Halloween decorating while Tate (Evan Peters) is harassed by bloody teens while on a date with Violet (Taissa Farmiga). Kate Mara and Zachary Quinto are credited as special guest stars for their roles as Hayden McClaine, the student Ben was having an affair with; and Chad Warwick, one of the former owners of the house.

== Plot ==
=== Part 1 ===
A flashback shows a couple, Chad and Patrick, who own the house in 2010. Chad confronts Patrick about his infidelity. The Rubber Man appears after Patrick leaves the room, and attacks Chad. Patrick reenters the room and sees the Rubber Man.

Larry demands payment for killing Hayden, which Ben refuses.

Adelaide is hit by a car. Constance attempts to get her to the Harmons' lawn before she dies, so she could become a ghost, but fails. Tate tells Violet the Infantata is Dr. Charles Montgomery and Nora's son, Charles having brought him back to life using animal parts after he was dismembered.

Vivien realizes Ben has sent several texts to Hayden, but Ben insists that he and Hayden are over. Vivien and Ben go to the hospital, after Vivien's unborn baby kicks at only eight weeks. The baby is more developed than it should be, and the nurse collapses after seeing it.

On Halloween night, when the ghosts can leave the house, Moira visits her mother in the hospital. She then disconnects her life support machine, but is unable to pass on with her.

When Vivien and Ben return, they find the house broken into and Violet missing. Ben sees Hayden at the door.

=== Part 2 ===
Tate and Violet are revealed to have gone out on a date, and Violet calls Vivien to assure her she is safe. Tate and Violet are confronted by five mutilated teenagers, who appear and harass Tate. Tate and Violet leave.

After Ben shuts the door on Hayden, and finds Larry. Ben believes that Hayden's murder was staged and she and Larry are attempting to extort him. Larry realizes that Hayden is a ghost, but Ben doesn't believe him and threatens to kill Larry. Ben finds Hayden and she reveals to him that she actually is dead.

Hayden confronts Vivien, and they find out that they are both pregnant. Ben is forced to admit that he impregnated Hayden months after Vivien discovered the affair. Hayden is arrested, but she disappears from the car. Vivien forces Ben to leave the house, explaining she'll be filing for divorce.

Tate returns Violet back to the house, only for the teens to find them there. They proceed to bother and taunt Violet, but Tate stops them by making the quintet chase him. The teens catch up with Tate and reveal they are ghosts that Tate killed. The ghosts try to find out why Tate killed them, but Tate cannot remember anything. Constance reveals to Violet that Tate is her son, which leaves her in shock.

== Production ==
Part one was written by co-executive producer James Wong, part two was written by consulting producer Tim Minear. Both parts were directed by David Semel.

Regarding the house and its ghosts, series co-creator Ryan Murphy speaks as though the Harmon house is alive. "One of the things about the house we're trying to say," he says, "is that the house always has sort of a prescient intelligence in that it knows exactly the right moment to send the undead back to fuck with the people who live in the house. The house knows what you're afraid of and will scare you. The house also knows what you need to hear and then will provide it. So the timing of it, it's almost like what's going on in these character's personal lives is what conjures these spirits."

About the character Chad, Murphy likes Zachary Quinto's take on him, "I think there's a great sadness that he [Quinto] plays to somebody who sort of gave everything to something, be it the house or a relationship, and then it doesn't turn out to your preconceived notions. I think he plays that frustration well. I also love his [Chad's] connection to Vivien in that he and Vivien are both with sex addicts. So there's great pain and frustration to loving somebody with that situation and also like, 'Why do you stay?' I think he created this world of beauty and comfort and hopefully children in the future and so I like the rage of it."

== Reception ==
"Halloween (Part 1)" received an 86% approval rating from Rotten Tomatoes, based on 7 reviews, and "Halloween (Part 2)" received an 88% approval rating, based on 8 reviews. IGN's Matt Fowler gave the first part an overall score of 8, describing the episode as a "fairly unsettling romp", adding that the death of Adelaide was unexpected and that Constance's reaction to her daughter's death was "wrenching". Emily VanDerWerff from The A.V. Club gave the first part a C+ grade. She awarded the second part of the episode a B grade.

In its original American broadcast, "Halloween (Part 1)" was seen by an estimated 2.96 million household viewers and gained a 1.7 ratings share among adults aged 18–49; a then series high. The second part received a 1.6 ratings share among adults 18–49, down a tenth of a point from the first part.
