= Birth (American Horror Story) =

- American Horror Story episode
- Episode no.: Season 1 Episode 11
- Directed by: Alfonso Gomez-Rejon
- Written by: Tim Minear
- Production code: 1ATS10
- Original air date: December 14, 2011
- Running time: 42 minutes

Guest appearances
- Kate Mara as Hayden McClaine; Zachary Quinto as Chad Warwick; Frances Conroy as Moira O'Hara; Lily Rabe as Nora Montgomery; Matt Ross as Dr. Charles Montgomery; Sarah Paulson as Billie Dean Howard; Teddy Sears as Patrick; Steven Anderson as Dr. Marchesi; Rosa Salazar as Maria

Episode chronology
← Previous "Smoldering Children"	Next → "Afterbirth"
- American Horror Story: Murder House

"Birth" is the eleventh episode of the first season of the television series American Horror Story, which premiered on the network FX on December 14, 2011. The episode was written by Tim Minear and directed by Alfonso Gomez-Rejon. This episode is rated TV-MA (LV).

The episode was nominated for a Primetime Emmy Award for Outstanding Single-Camera Picture Editing for a Miniseries or a Movie.

In this episode, Vivien (Connie Britton) gives birth and her daughter Violet (Taissa Farmiga) learn that Tate (Evan Peters) is the biological father to one of her new siblings. Kate Mara and Zachary Quinto guest star as Hayden McClaine and Chad Warwick, respectively.

== Plot ==
Tate cannot promise Vivien's baby to Nora, who Tate treats as his mother ever since she saved him from the Infantata and taught him how to make the ghosts leave him alone, for fear of revealing to Violet that he raped her mother, but Nora is resolved to take the child anyway. Ben picks up Vivien to take her from the ward to her flight to Florida, not understanding why Violet refuses to leave with him. The doctor tells Vivien and Ben that one of the twins is ready to be born imminently.

In the house, Violet and Tate realize Chad and Patrick are planning to take the twins. Violet asks Constance for help, who confronts Chad and says he can have Ben's child, but her grandson is her own. Chad realizes that Tate fathered one of the twins. Constance and Violet enlist the help of Billie Dean, who teaches Violet a banishment spell.

Violet tells Ben that she is dead and can't leave the house, and urges him to take Vivien away from the house and its ghosts before she gives birth, but Ben doesn't believe her. Meanwhile, Vivien goes into labor in the car and Constance appears and takes her into the house. The power goes out and ghosts destroy their car, forcing Ben and Vivien to have the babies there. Dr. Charles Montgomery handles the delivery.

Violet recites the banishment spell but realizes it doesn't work. Chad tells her that Tate killed him and Patrick and also raped Vivien.

Vivien gives birth, with the first twin being stillborn, and Dr. Montgomery hands it to Nora. Constance takes the second twin to wash it. Vivien begins to postpartum hemorrhage due to the larger child. Violet appears and urges her to let go and join her in the afterlife. Ben, unaware of Violet's presence, urges Vivien to live. Vivien dies and Ben finds himself alone.

Violet confronts despondent Tate, revealing that she knows everything he has done and she forces him to remember the school massacre and then asks why he murdered Chad and Patrick and raped her mother, but doesn't answer rather than "I was different then. You changed me." Violet tells him she believes that she loves him, but she cannot forgive him. Feeling burdened and overwhelmed by guilt over his mistakes at what he did, Tate tearfully attempts to plead with Violet for forgiveness, only for Violet to lash out at him by saying "Go away". As he leaves, Violet becomes emotionally devastated and heartbroken, but Vivien's ghost appears and comforts her daughter to calm her down.

== Production ==
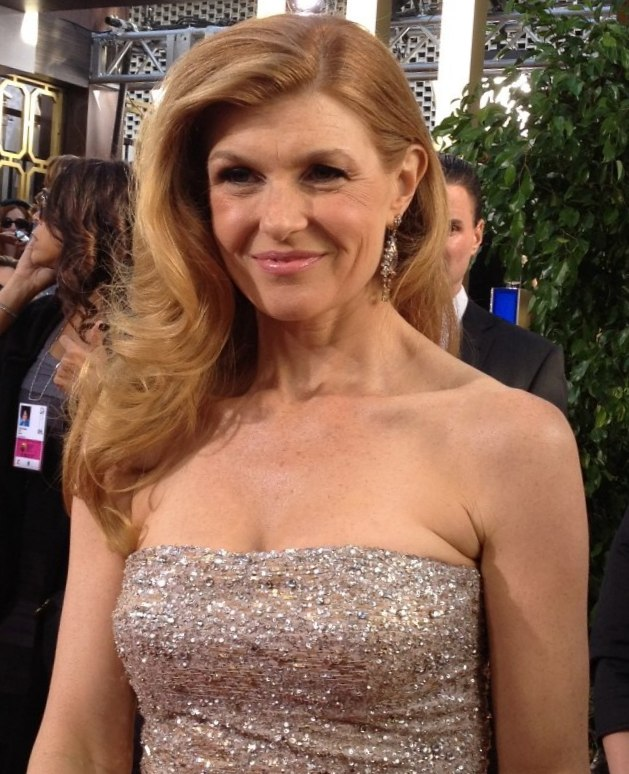
Connie Britton knew from the beginning of her character's fate.

The episode was written by consulting producer Tim Minear, while Alfonso Gomez-Rejon directed.

In an interview with Entertainment Weekly, series co-creator Ryan Murphy stated that he had told Connie Britton, early on, that her character Vivien would die this season. "We've really had the whole season mapped out from the beginning," he said. "In the meetings with the core actors, the three leads being Connie, Dylan [McDermott] and Jessica [Lange], as we tried to snare them we were able to say this is where you start, this is the middle, and this is where you end up. So, yes, I was able to tell Connie really the whole run of the series."

== Reception ==
Rotten Tomatoes reports a 100% approval rating, based on 9 reviews. James Queally of The Star-Ledger commented about the episode, "For 10 episodes American Horror Story has ranged from ridiculous to ghoulish fun... but "Birth" is all execution, and quite frankly, that might be exactly what this show needs to be." The A.V. Club's Emily VanDerWerff stated, "In general, I thought "Birth" was basically fine, just my kind of genre hokum/guilty pleasure. But at the same time, it was just a touch too sedate."

In its original American broadcast, "Birth" was seen by an estimated 2.59 million household viewers and earned a 1.4 rating share among adults aged 18–49, according to Nielsen Media Research. The episode was up in number of viewers but down in the age range from the previous episode.
