= Open House (American Horror Story) =

- American Horror Story episode
- Episode no.: Season 1 Episode 7
- Directed by: Tim Hunter
- Written by: Brad Falchuk
- Production code: 1ATS06
- Original air date: November 16, 2011
- Running time: 41 minutes

Guest appearances
- Frances Conroy as Moira O'Hara; Alexandra Breckenridge as Young Moira O'Hara; Lily Rabe as Nora Montgomery; Matt Ross as Dr. Charles Montgomery; Christine Estabrook as Marcy; David Anthony Higgins as Stan; Amir Arison as Joe Escandarian; Eve Gordon as Dr. Hall; Rebecca Wisocky as Lorraine Harvey; Rosa Salazar as Maria; Morris Chestnut as Luke

Episode chronology
← Previous "Piggy Piggy"	Next → "Rubber Man"
- American Horror Story: Murder House

"Open House" is the seventh episode of the first season of the television series American Horror Story, which premiered on the network FX on November 16, 2011. The episode was written by co-creator and executive producer Brad Falchuk and was directed by Tim Hunter. This episode is rated TV-MA (LSV).

In this episode, Violet (Taissa Farmiga) is confronted by a revelation, while Vivien (Connie Britton) learns she is pregnant with twins.

In 2012, this episode was nominated for a Primetime Emmy Award for Outstanding Art Direction for a Miniseries or Movie.

== Plot ==
A flashback shows that in 1994, Constance learns that Beau, her deformed son who lives chained in the house's attic, may be taken away, due to her neglectful parenting. In love with Constance, Larry euthanizes Beau, in order to prevent it.

Violet takes solace in Tate, who reveals that he is aware of the ghosts, and says they will not harm her if she just tells them to leave her alone. He shows her some old photographs he found of the Montgomerys. Vivien learns that she is pregnant with twins.

Resolved to be up front with prospective buyers about the house's past, she learns of the Montgomerys and learns that Charles revived their son into a monster, causing his wife Nora to go insane and kill Charles and herself. A sleazy developer becomes interested in the house, and reveals his plan to tear down the gazebo and build a swimming pool, leading young Moira to seduce him in hopes that he will buy the property and her remains will be discovered.

Ben confronts Larry at his home, and learns that Larry's wife immolated herself and their daughters in the house after he confesses he was leaving them for Constance, and wants the house so he can be with Constance. Ben mocks him by saying the developer will buy the house and tear it down to build condominiums. Constance learns of this and attempts to appeal to the developer, but he cruelly rebuffs her. She informs Moira that he lied to her about the gazebo and intends to build condos instead, which would seal Moira on the grounds forever. They put aside their enmity, and with Larry's help, lead the developer into the basement and suffocate him with a rubber bag. They quickly take him off the grounds before he dies.

Violet shares the photos of the Montgomerys with Vivien, who is shocked to find that she recognizes Nora as one of the interested buyers for the house ("Murder House").

== Production ==
Series co-creator Ryan Murphy has admitted his obsession with the character of Marcy, the realtor, played by Christine Estabrook, who was more prominent in "Open House". He stated, "I love her! I love her! Every episode we're like 'We're killing Marcy this episode. This is the episode.' And then we get to writing her and she's too hilarious to kill. I think she's been a great source of levity and I think she's a terrible person. She's a racist and a homophobe and the worst realtor in the world. She's that incompetent bumbler. I like to imitate her in the writer's room."

== Reception ==
Rotten Tomatoes reports an 82% approval rating, based on 11 reviews. The critical consensus reads, ""Open House" wraps up the first half of the season and blazes a cringe-worthy path towards the finale." New York Magazine's Julieanne Smolinski said of the episode, "I don't know...but I love this show as though it were the deformed attic monster I asked my disfigured boyfriend to lust-murder." James Queally of The Star-Ledger called the episode "another average episode of what's becoming in my eyes, just an average series."

In its original American broadcast, "Open House" was seen by an estimated 3.06 million household viewers and gained a 1.8 ratings share among adults aged 18–49, according to Nielsen Media Research. The episode rose two tenths from the previous episode, becoming a series high.
