= The Return of Avery Jessup =

- 30 Rock episode
- Episode no.: Season 6 Episode 21
- Directed by: John Riggi
- Written by: Josh Siegal; Dylan Morgan
- Production code: 621
- Original air date: May 10, 2012

Guest appearances
- James Marsden as Criss Chros; Margaret Cho as Kim Jong Il and Kim Jong Un; Michael Mosley as Scott Scottsman; Elizabeth Banks as Avery Jessup

Episode chronology
← Previous "Queen of Jordan 2: Mystery of the Phantom Pooper"	Next → "What Will Happen to the Gang Next Year?"
- 30 Rock season 6

"The Return of Avery Jessup" is the twenty-first episode of the sixth season of the American television comedy series 30 Rock, and the 124th overall episode of the series. It was directed by John Riggi, and written by Josh Siegal and Dylan Morgan. The episode originally aired on NBC in the United States on May 10, 2012.

In the episode, Jack (Alec Baldwin) struggles with confessing his transgressions to his wife Avery (Elizabeth Banks) upon her return from North Korea; Criss (James Marsden) tries to fill the traditionally male provider role in preparation for potentially having a child with Liz (Tina Fey); and Jenna (Jane Krakowski) tries to rediscover her southern roots to win a sponsor for her upcoming celebrity wedding.

== Plot ==
When Jack's wife Avery (Elizabeth Banks) finally returns from captivity in North Korea, she is accompanied by fellow newscaster and American Scott Scottsman (Michael Mosley). He had been a hostage at the same time as Avery. Avery offers blanket forgiveness for any infidelity Jack (Alec Baldwin) might have committed during her absence, which makes Jack suspicious that she is covering up something of her own, probably involving Scott. He gradually reveals the full extent of his flirtation with Avery's mother, Diana, which does not prompt Avery to reveal any secrets. Finally, Jack discovers that the forgiveness was a ploy to get Jack to immediately confess everything he'd done. Jack and Avery rejoice that they are back to their usual competitive relationship and decide to renew their vows, going against Liz's advice.

When Criss (James Marsden) estimates that home renovations will cost $10,000, he laments that he is not, as a man, able to provide for their household and potential child. Over Liz's protestations that it doesn't matter, he decides to improve his hot dog business. He starts occupying a new spot on the street. The spot he chooses was normally held by some off-brand muppets who harass tourists. In the ensuing brawl, he is rescued by Liz and Jenna.

Jenna (Jane Krakowski) seeks a sponsor for her upcoming celebrity wedding. The Southern Tourism Board is a possibility, but Jenna cannot recover the Southern accent she discarded after growing up there. Following some accent coaching from Kenneth (Jack McBrayer) and Tracy (Tracy Morgan), as well as the brawl with the muppets, Jenna realizes that off-brand shoes are her perfect market niche.

== Reception ==
Both Elizabeth Banks and Margaret Cho received nominations at the 64th Primetime Emmy Awards for Outstanding Guest Actress in a Comedy Series for their performances in this episode as Avery Jessup and Kim Jong-il respectively. The A.V. Club gave the episode a B.
