= Piggy Piggy =

- American Horror Story episode
- Episode no.: Season 1 Episode 6
- Directed by: Michael Uppendahl
- Written by: Jessica Sharzer
- Production code: 1ATS05
- Original air date: November 9, 2011
- Running time: 44 minutes

Guest appearances
- Eric Stonestreet as Derek; Frances Conroy as Moira O'Hara; Matt Ross as Charles Montgomery; Sarah Paulson as Billie Dean Howard; Brando Eaton as Kyle Greenwell; Ashley Rickards as Chloe Stapleton; Alessandra Torresani as Stephanie Boggs; Jordan David as Kevin Gedman; Tom Gallop as Mr. Carmichael; Azura Skye as Fiona; Kyle Davis as Dallas; Eve Gordon as Dr. Hall; Shelby Young as Leah; Morris Chestnut as Luke

Episode chronology
← Previous "Halloween"	Next → "Open House"
- American Horror Story: Murder House

"Piggy Piggy" is the sixth episode of the first season of the television series American Horror Story, which premiered on the network FX on November 9, 2011. The episode was written by supervising producer Jessica Sharzer and directed by Michael Uppendahl. This episode is rated TV-MA (LV).

Piggy Piggy was nominated for Primetime Emmy Awards for Outstanding Sound Editing for a Miniseries, Movie, or a Special, and for Outstanding Sound Mixing for a Miniseries or a Movie.

In this episode, Ben (Dylan McDermott) sees a patient who fears an urban legend about a man who slaughters those who say a special mantra into a mirror. Eric Stonestreet guest stars as Derek, Ben's patient.

== Plot ==
Flashing back to 1994, Tate shoots and kills several students in a school shooting, including the five teenagers seen in the previous episode. A SWAT team later storms the Langdon household, looking to arrest Tate. Constance begs them not to hurt him. They burst into his room where they find him there. Tate mocks them by putting a finger gun to his head, imitating shooting himself. Tate pulls out a gun and is shot dead by the SWAT team. All this occurs in the Murder House (then owned by Constance).

After Violet finds out that Tate killed the teenagers, Constance introduces her to a medium, Billie Dean Howard. Billie and Constance explain that Tate is unaware that he is dead; Constance has been sending him to Ben, hoping it will help him pass on and they need Violet's help.

Ben sees a new patient, named Derek, who is terrified by urban legends, including "Piggy Man". The story goes that a man was a hog butcher. He retrieved a severed pig's head and went on a killing spree at the 1893 Chicago World's Fair then later died by getting devoured by his own pigs. It is said he will slaughter anyone who repeats a specific chant in the mirror. Ben also begins noticing that Vivien has developed an attraction to the security officer Luke.

Constance and Moira convince Vivien to eat offal to help with the pregnancy. Vivien contacts the ultrasound technician who fainted during the ultrasound, who claims that she saw that the baby is the Devil.

Taking Ben's advice to face his fear, Derek repeats the chant in his bathroom mirror, but is shot and killed by an armed burglar hiding in his shower. Violet tries to confront Tate in the basement, but is mobbed by the other ghosts. Overwhelmed with guilt, she attempts suicide by taking a handful of sleeping pills given to her by Leah, but Tate attempts to save her by forcing her to vomit the pills.

Later, Tate break down in tears, confesses that he loves her and cannot understand why she has turned cold towards him. He plans to leave her alone if that's what she wants, but she comforts him. Constance speaks to Adelaide through Billie Dean and learns that she is glad she wasn't revived as a ghost because she now fears to be near Tate, after learning what he did.

== Production ==
The episode was written by supervising producer Jessica Sharzer, and directed by Michael Uppendahl.

On creating the character of Billie Dean and her "gift", series co-creator Ryan Murphy relates his own experience with a medium, "When we created her, all of us in the writer's room have had some experience with psychics or not. I'm somebody that was very skeptical until I went to a woman who [asked] me out of nowhere, 'Is your father ill?' and I said, 'No. He just had a physical and he's fine.' She said, 'You need to tell him to go back.' So he did go back and they found prostate cancer and he died two years later. So Billie Dean was inspired a large part by that experience. We are saying that, yes, she is legitimate."

== Reception ==
Rotten Tomatoes reports an 89% approval rating, based on 9 reviews. Carissa Pavlica of TV Fanatic gave the episode 4.7 out of 5 stars, saying, "I have absolutely no idea what is happening on American Horror Story and I love every moment of it." The Star-Ledger's James Queally said, ""Piggy Piggy" contains more good than bad, but it also has a lot of scenes that require me to take a wait-and-see approach."

In its original American broadcast, "Piggy Piggy" was seen by an estimated 2.83 million household viewers and gained a 1.6 ratings share among adults aged 18–49.
