= Alessandra Torresani =

American actress (born 1987)

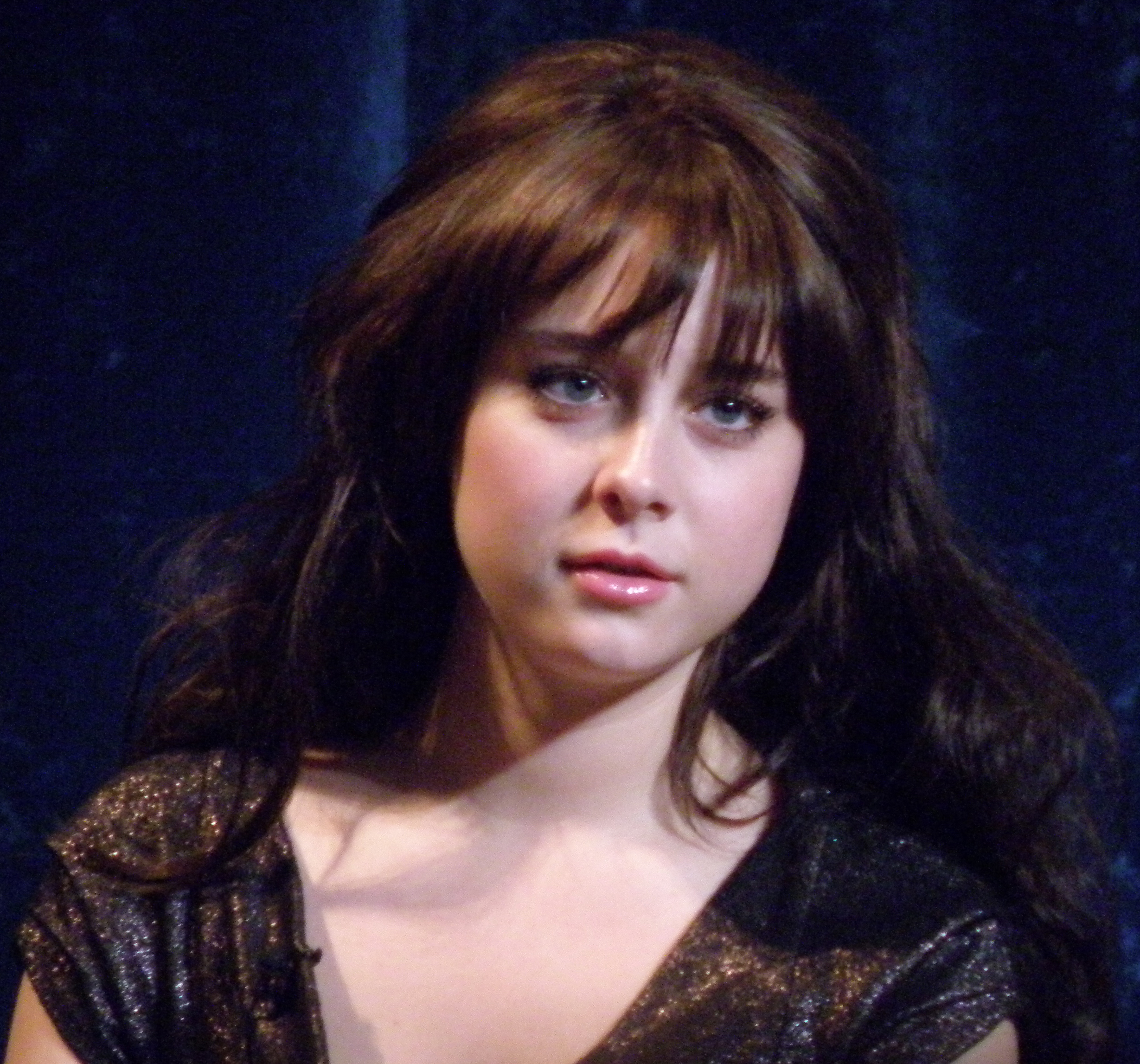
- Torresani in April 2009
- Born: Alessandra Olivia Toreson; May 29, 1987 (age 39); Palo Alto, California, U.S.
- Occupation: Actress
- Years active: 1996–present
- Spouse: Sturgis Adams
- Children: Lady Francis Adams
- Parents: James Sylvester Toreson (father); Marcia Glow (mother)

Alessandra Olivia Toreson (born May 29, 1987), known professionally as Alessandra Torresani, is an American actress. She is known for playing Zoe Graystone in the science fiction television series Caprica and Claire in The Big Bang Theory.

== Early life ==
Alessandra Olivia Toreson was born on May 29, 1987, in Palo Alto, California. Coming from a wealthy family, she is the daughter of James Sylvester Toreson, overseer of a number of multimillion dollar technology startups at Freedom Motors Inc. and CEO of Toreson Industries, Inc, a company he founded in 1983, and wife Marcia Glow, managing director of Coldwell Banker Residential Brokerage.

She began studying dancing and singing when she was two years old. At the age of 8, she landed a job doing interviews between cartoons on The WB Television Network. She holds a black belt in taekwondo.

She has stated that she is "half-Jewish."

== Career ==
Torresani's television debut was at age nine when she hosted the "Kids' WB Club" for San Francisco's KBWB (Channel 20). She co-starred in the Disney Channel Original Movie Going to the Mat. Her other television credits include guest appearances on Even Stevens, JAG, ER, The War at Home, Malcolm In The Middle, Arrested Development, Terminator: The Sarah Connor Chronicles, and CSI: Crime Scene Investigation among others. In May 2008, Torresani was cast as Zoe Graystone in Syfy's Caprica, a prequel spin-off of Battlestar Galactica, which debuted in 2009.

In 2009, Rolling Stone announced that she was cast to play Lita Ford in The Runaways, a biopic about the all-girl punk band of the same name. Variety later reported that it was Scout Taylor-Compton who would play Ford. In 2010, Torresani was featured as a Girl of Maxim.

In 2013, Torresani starred in the comedy web series Husbands, which first aired on September 13, 2011.

In 2016, she appeared in five episodes of The Big Bang Theory, playing the role of bartender and aspiring screenwriter Claire.

== Personal life ==
Torresani lives with bipolar disorder and hosts EmotionAL Support with Alessandra Torresani, a mental health podcast.

She is married to Sturgis Adams and has one daughter, Lady Francis Adams.

== Filmography ==
=== Film ===
Year	Title	Role	Notes
1999	Lost and Found	Park Girl	
2000	Mad Song	Alex	
2000	Baby Bedlam	Becky	
2010	Annie Goes Boating	Annie	Short film
2012	Playback	Brianna	
2013	The Moment	Emma	
2016	Car Dogs	Sheri	
2018	Step Sisters	Amber	Direct-to-video film

=== Television ===
Year	Title	Role	Notes
1997	KaBlam!	n/a	Episode: "Brothers Tiki"
1998	ER	Kate	Episode: "Stuck on You"
1999	Working	Tiffany	Episode: "The Prodigy"
1999	My Last Love	Emma	Movie
2000	Popular	Emily/Emma	Episode: "Baby, Don't Do It!"
2000	Even Stevens	Mimi Nagurski	Episode: "Luscious Lou"
2003	Newton	Holly Pryor	Movie
2001, 2003	Malcolm in the Middle	Sara Coleman/Kirsten	Episodes: "Malcolm's Girlfriend", "Thanksgiving"
2004	Going to the Mat	Mary Beth Rice	Movie
2004	JAG	Susan Smithfield	Episode: "Coming Home"
2004	Arrested Development	Ann Veal	Episode: "Let 'Em Eat Cake", character was portrayed by Mae Whitman in every other appearance
2004	Grounded for Life	Carolyn	Episode: "I'm Looking Through You"
2005	Love, Inc.	Holly	Episode: "Major Dad"
2005	The War at Home	Alison	Episode: "The Bigger They Come"
2006	Grand Union	Meaghan McBride	Movie
2007	Bones	Teenaged Girl Elf	Episode: "The Santa in the Slush"
2008	Happy Campers	Dylan Dixon	Movie
2008	Terminator: The Sarah Connor Chronicles	Jordan Cowan	Episode: "The Turk"
2009	CSI: Crime Scene Investigation	Bree Lindale	Episode: "Turn, Turn, Turn"
2009–10	Caprica	Zoe Graystone	Series regular (16 episodes)
2011	RuPaul's Drag Race	Herself/Guest Judge	Episode: "Queens in Space"
2011	Warehouse 13	Meagan Reese	Episode: "Shadows"
2011–13	Husbands	Haley	8 episodes
2011	American Horror Story	Stephanie Boggs	Episodes: "Halloween: Part 2", "Piggy Piggy"
2014	Two and a Half Men	Kathy	Episode: "Thirty-Eight, Sixty-Two, Thirty-Eight"
2015	The Fosters	Brooke	Season 3. 3 episodes
2015	Workaholics	Crystal	Episode: "Dorm Daze"
2016–17	The Big Bang Theory	Claire	Recurring (season 9); Guest (season 10)
2016	Lucifer	Naomi	Episode: "Pops"
2020	Batwoman	Duela Dent	Episode: "Grinning from Ear to Ear"
