= Frances Conroy =

American actress

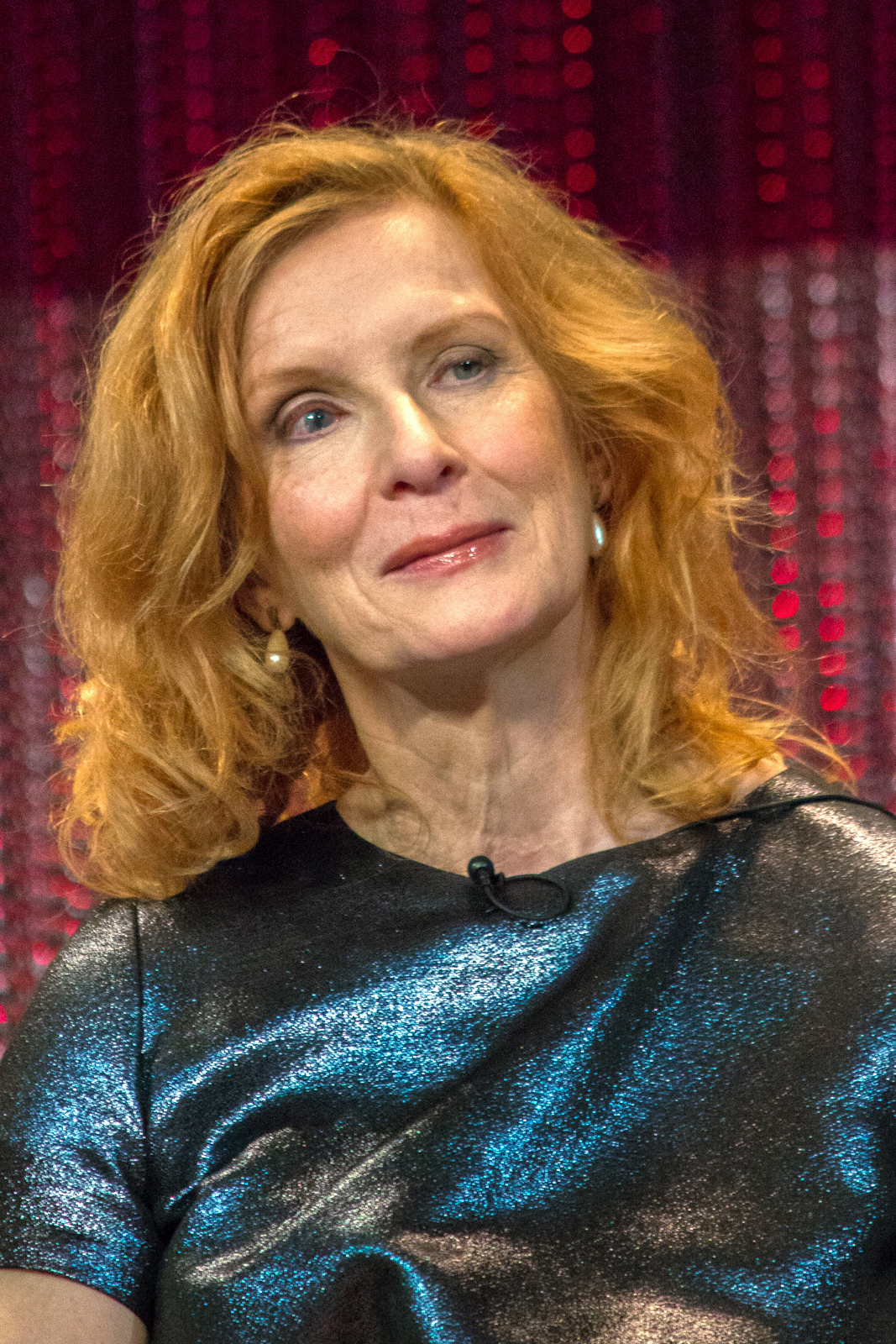
- Conroy at PaleyFest in 2014
- Born: Frances Hardman Conroy; March 15, 1953 (age 73); Monroe, Georgia
- Education: Juilliard School (BFA)
- Occupation: Actress
- Years active: 1976–present
- Spouse(s): Jonathan Furst (m. 1980, divorced) Jan Munroe (m. 1992)

Frances Hardman Conroy (born March 15, 1953) is an American actress. She is best known for playing Ruth Fisher on the television series Six Feet Under (2001–2005), for which she won a Golden Globe and three Screen Actors Guild Awards, and received four Primetime Emmy Awards nominations for Outstanding Lead Actress in a Drama Series. She is also known for playing the older version of Moira O'Hara in season one of the television anthology series American Horror Story, which garnered Conroy her first Saturn Award for Best Supporting Actress on Television nomination, and as well a Primetime Emmy Awards nomination for Outstanding Supporting Actress in a Miniseries or a Movie. Conroy subsequently portrayed The Angel of Death, Myrtle Snow, Gloria Mott, Mama Polk, Bebe Babbitt, and Belle Noir on eight further seasons of the show: Asylum, Coven, Freak Show, Roanoke, Cult, Apocalypse, Double Feature and 13, respectively; this makes Conroy, along with Lily Rabe, fourth among the actors who have appeared in most seasons of the show. For her performance in Coven, she was nominated again for a Primetime Emmy Award for Outstanding Supporting Actress in a Miniseries or a Movie.

She starred as Dawn in the first season of the Hulu original series Casual, which was nominated for a Golden Globe Award for its first season. In 2017, she starred as Nathalie Raven in The Mist. In 2019, she starred in Joker as the title character's mother. In 2021, she had a supporting role in The Power of the Dog.

== Early life and education ==
Conroy was born March 15, 1953, the daughter of Ossie Ray Conroy and Vincent P. Conroy. She was born in Georgia and grew up in Setauket, New York. She studied at the Juilliard School and was a member of Juilliard's Drama Division Group 6 (1973–1977) which also included Kevin Conroy (no relation), Kelsey Grammer, Harriet Sansom Harris, and Robin Williams.

== Career and filmography ==
During the 1970s, she performed regularly with regional and touring theatrical companies (most notably The Acting Company), and appeared as Desdemona at the Delacorte Theatre in a production of Othello with Richard Dreyfuss and Raul Julia. She returned to the Delacorte in the summer of 1998 as, Mrs. Antrobus in Thorton Wilder's The Skin of Our Teeth. One of her first film appearances was as a Shakespearean actress in Woody Allen's 1979 classic, Manhattan. In 1980, she made a very well received Broadway debut in Edward Albee's The Lady from Dubuque. She focused primarily on her stage career for the next two decades, appearing in such productions as Our Town, The Little Foxes, and The Ride Down Mt. Morgan, receiving one Tony and four Drama Desk Award nominations (including a Drama Desk win for The Secret Rapture). Conroy had a small role in the 1984 movie Falling in Love, as a waitress in a swanky restaurant. In 1988, she appeared as an elder daughter of Burt Lancaster's dying patriarch in Rocket Gibraltar. That same year, she appeared in supporting roles in Dirty Rotten Scoundrels and Another Woman. In 1992, she played Christine Downes in the film Scent of a Woman.

=== 2001–05: Six Feet Under ===
She is best known for her critically acclaimed work on HBO's original drama series Six Feet Under, which she starred in from 2001 until the series' end in 2005, playing the volatile family matriarch Ruth Fisher. During the series' run, Conroy won the Golden Globe Award for Best Actress – Television Series Drama in 2004. She was also nominated for four Primetime Emmy Award for Outstanding Lead Actress in a Drama Series awards, without winning. Along with the cast of the show, they were awarded two times in 2003 and 2004 the Screen Actors Guild Award for Outstanding Performance by an Ensemble in a Drama Series, as well as Conroy winning the individual 2004 award for Outstanding Performance by a Female Actor in a Drama Series. The series ended in 2005, having aired 63 original episodes.

=== 2005–10: Desperate Housewives and How I Met Your Mother ===
In 2008, she landed a guest role in ABC's Desperate Housewives as Virginia Hildebrand, a rich woman who tries to buy the Solis family's love.

Along with many guest appearances on television in the mid-2000s, she was cast in a recurring role on How I Met Your Mother, as Barney Stinson's mother Loretta Stinson. And in 2010, Conroy portrayed the character Angie Dinkley in the animated show Scooby-Doo! Mystery Incorporated.

In 2010, Conroy played Madylyn, the wife of Robert De Niro's character Jack Mabrey, in the John Curran thriller Stone. In the same year, Conroy played the recurring role of Peggy Haplin in the short-lived ABC drama series Happy Town.

=== 2011–2024: American Horror Story and The Power of the Dog ===
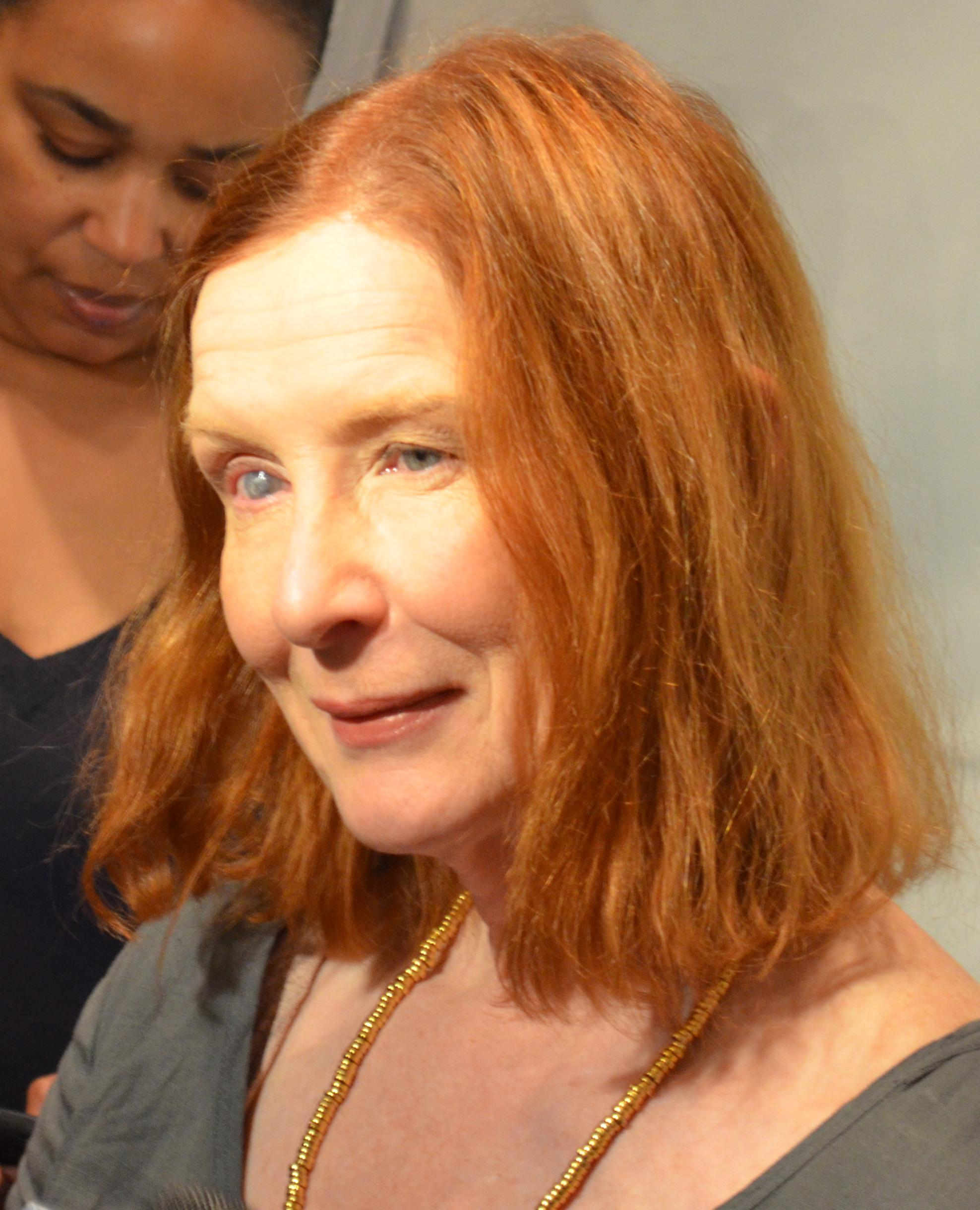
Conroy in March 2012

In 2011, she was cast in a new drama series for FX titled American Horror Story. Conroy was one of two actresses, the other being Alexandra Breckenridge, playing a woman named Moira O'Hara. When the season came to an end in 2011, it was announced that the show was intended to be an anthology series, in which each season would be completely different with new characters each season. During this time, Conroy was nominated for a fifth Primetime Emmy Award in the Outstanding Supporting Actress in a Miniseries or a Movie category.

For the second season, dubbed Asylum, Conroy re-joined the cast playing Shachath, The Angel of Death, alongside an unnamed prison transfer, in a multi-episode arc. And in 2013, she guest starred on Royal Pains; portraying Blythe Ballard. She also co-starred in the television movie Ring of Fire, where she played Maybelle Carter. Conroy was once more cast for American Horror Story's third season during this time, Coven, being promoted to series regular, playing Myrtle Snow, a member of the Witches Council in New Orleans, Louisiana. She was subsequently nominated for a sixth Primetime Emmy Award and her second nomination for Outstanding Supporting Actress in a Miniseries or a Movie.

In 2014, she returned for the fourth season of the series, titled Freak Show, as Gloria Mott, a wealthy woman whose psychotic, spoiled son wants to join the freak show. Conroy later returned in the 2016 season, Roanoke, portraying an actress in the re-enactment portion of the season. As of 2015, Conroy starred as Dawn on the Hulu original series Casual. In July 2017, it was announced via Twitter that Conroy would appear in American Horror Story: Cult, marking her sixth appearance on the show..

In 2018, Conroy reprised her respective roles as Myrtle Snow and Moira O'Hara from Coven and Murder House in Ryan Murphy's American Horror Story: Apocalypse, her seventh appearance on the show. Conroy co-starred in the 2019 film Joker, an origin story film of the Batman supervillain the Joker, as the character's mother.

She returned to the American Horror Story franchise in 2021 with American Horror Story: Double Feature. The same year she acted as Mrs. Burbank in the critically acclaimed film The Power of the Dog, winning her first Satellite Award and receiving a Critics' Choice Awards nomination as a member of the cast.

In 2023, Conroy voiced The Director in the animated feature film Nimona.

In 2026, Conroy returned to American Horror Story for its thirteenth season and was photographed filming in New York City alongside several other returning cast members.

== Personal life ==
In 1980, she married Jonathan Furst; they divorced in the late 1980s, and Conroy subsequently married actor Jan Munroe in 1992.

In the 1990s, Conroy was involved in a car accident that injured her right eye. The cornea was surgically repaired, but the procedure left the eye discolored.

== Awards and nominations ==
Awards and nominations received by Jessica Lange
| Award | Year (Note: The listed year refers to the date of the ceremony.) | Category | Work | Result | Ref. |
|---|---|---|---|---|---|
| Drama Desk Awards | 1980 | Outstanding Featured Actress in a Play | Othello | Nominated | |
| Drama Desk Awards | 1990 | Outstanding Featured Actress in a Play | The Secret Rapture | Won | |
| Drama Desk Awards | 1994 | Outstanding Featured Actress in a Play | In the Summer House | Nominated | |
| Drama Desk Awards | 1997 | Outstanding Actress in a Play | The Rehearsal | Nominated | |
| Golden Globe Awards | 2004 | Best Actress – Television Series Drama | Six Feet Under | Won | |
| Obie Awards | 1993 | Distinguished Performance by an Actress | The Last Yankee | Won | |
| Outer Critics Circle Awards | 1980 | Outstanding Featured Actress in a Play | The Ride Down Mt. Morgan | Won | |
| Primetime Emmy Awards | 2002 | Outstanding Lead Actress in a Drama Series | Six Feet Under | Nominated | |
| Primetime Emmy Awards | 2003 | Outstanding Lead Actress in a Drama Series | Six Feet Under | Nominated | |
| Primetime Emmy Awards | 2005 | Outstanding Lead Actress in a Drama Series | Six Feet Under | Nominated | |
| Primetime Emmy Awards | 2006 | Outstanding Lead Actress in a Drama Series | Six Feet Under | Nominated | |
| Primetime Emmy Awards | 2012 | Outstanding Supporting Actress in a Miniseries or Movie | American Horror Story: Murder House | Nominated | |
| Primetime Emmy Awards | 2014 | Outstanding Supporting Actress in a Miniseries or Movie | American Horror Story: Coven | Nominated | |
| Saturn Awards | 2012 | Best Supporting Actress on Television | American Horror Story: Murder House | Nominated | |
| Screen Actors Guild Awards | 2002 | Outstanding Ensemble in a Drama Series | Six Feet Under | Nominated (Note: Shared with the cast.) | |
| Screen Actors Guild Awards | 2003 | Outstanding Ensemble in a Drama Series | Six Feet Under | Won | |
| Screen Actors Guild Awards | 2004 | Outstanding Female Actor in a Drama Series | Six Feet Under | Won | |
| Screen Actors Guild Awards | 2004 | Outstanding Ensemble in a Drama Series | Six Feet Under | Won | |
| Screen Actors Guild Awards | 2005 | Outstanding Ensemble in a Drama Series | Six Feet Under | Nominated | |
| Screen Actors Guild Awards | 2006 | Outstanding Ensemble in a Drama Series | Six Feet Under | Nominated | |
| Tony Awards | 2000 | Best Featured Actress in a Play | The Ride Down Mt. Morgan | Nominated | |
| Women Film Critics Circle Awards | 2019 | Mommie Dearest Worst Screen Mom of the Year Award | Joker | Won | |
