= G.I. Joe (film series) =

Film series based on the G.I. Joe franchise

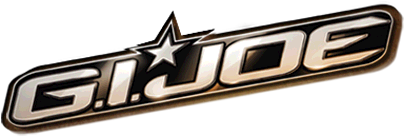
- The official G.I. Joe Hasbro toy line logo, which is also used for the film releases
- Directed by: Stephen Sommers (1); Jon M. Chu (2); Robert Schwentke (3); Danny McBride (4)
- Based on: G.I. Joe by Hasbro
- Distributed by: Paramount Pictures (Skydance)
- Country: United States
- Language: English
- Budget: $393–415 million
- Box office: $715 million

G.I. Joe is a series of American military science fiction action films based on the toy line of the same name. Development for the first film began in 2003, but when the United States launched the invasion of Iraq in March 2003, Hasbro suggested adapting the Transformers instead. In 2009, the first film was released, G.I. Joe: The Rise of Cobra. A second film, G.I. Joe: Retaliation, was released in 2013. A third film, centered on Snake Eyes titled Snake Eyes: G.I. Joe Origins, also serving as a reboot of the series, was released in 2021.

== Films ==
Film	U.S. release date	Director(s)	Screenwriter(s)	Story by	Producer(s)
G.I. Joe: The Rise of Cobra	August 7, 2009	Stephen Sommers	Paul Lovett, David Elliot & Stuart Beattie	Stuart Beattie, Stephen Sommers & Michael B. Gordon	Bob Ducsay, Brian Goldner & Lorenzo di Bonaventura
G.I. Joe: Retaliation	March 28, 2013	Jon M. Chu	Rhett Reese & Paul Wernick	Rhett Reese & Paul Wernick	Brian Goldner & Lorenzo di Bonaventura
Snake Eyes	July 23, 2021	Robert Schwentke	Joe Shrapnel, Anna Waterhouse & Evan Spiliotopoulos	Evan Spiliotopoulos	Brian Goldner, Erik Howsam & Lorenzo di Bonaventura

=== G.I. Joe: The Rise of Cobra (2009) ===
The first film in the series, released on August 7, 2009. It grossed $302 million worldwide. It was directed by Stephen Sommers from a screenplay by Stuart Beattie, David Elliot, and Paul Lovett and a story by Michael B. Gordon, Beattie, and Sommers.

In 1994, Larry Kasanoff and his production company, Threshold Entertainment, had held the rights to do a live-action G.I. Joe film with Warner Bros. as the distributor. Instead they chose to concentrate their efforts on their Mortal Kombat films. As late as 1999, there had been rumors that a film from Threshold Entertainment was still a possibility, but that project was canceled.

In 2003, Lorenzo di Bonaventura was interested in making a film about advanced military technology; Hasbro's Brian Goldner called him and suggested to base the film on the G.I. Joe toy line. Goldner and Bonaventura worked together before, creating toy lines for films Bonaventura produced as CEO of Warner Bros. Goldner and Bonaventura spent three months working out a story, and chose Michael B. Gordon as screenwriter, because they liked his script for 300. Bonaventura wanted to depict the origin story of certain characters, and introduced the new character of Rex, to allow an exploration of Duke. Rex's name came from Hasbro. Beforehand, Don Murphy was interested in filming the property, but when the Iraq War broke out, he considered the subject matter inappropriate, and chose to develop Transformers (another Hasbro toy line) instead. Bonaventura felt, "What [the Joes] stand for, and what Duke stands for specifically in the movie, is something that I'd like to think a worldwide audience might connect with."

By February 2005, Paul Lovett and David Elliot, who wrote Bonaventura's Four Brothers, were rewriting Gordon's draft. In their script, the Rex character is corrupted and mutated into the Cobra Commander, whom Destro needs to lead an army of supersoldiers. Skip Woods was rewriting the script by March 2007, and he added the Alex Mann character from the British Action Man toy line. Bonaventura explained, "Unfortunately, our president has put us in a position internationally where it would be very difficult to release a movie called G.I. Joe. To add one character to the mix is sort of a fun thing to do." The script was leaked online by El Mayimbe of Latino Review, who revealed Woods had dropped the Cobra Organization in favor of the Naja / Ryan, a crooked CIA agent. In this draft, Scarlett is married to Action Man but still has feelings for Duke, and is killed by the Baroness. Snake Eyes speaks, but his vocal cords are slashed during the story, rendering him mute. Mayimbe suggested Stuart Beattie rewrite the script. Fan response to the film following the script review was negative. Bonaventura promised with subsequent rewrites, "I'm hoping we're going to get it right this time." He admitted he had problems with Cobra, concurring with an interviewer "they were probably the stupidest evil organization out there [as depicted in the cartoon]". Hasbro promised to write Cobra back into the script.

In August 2007, Paramount Pictures hired Stephen Sommers to direct the film after his presentation to CEO Brad Grey and production prexy Brad Weston was well received. Sommers had been inspired to explore the G.I. Joe universe after visiting Hasbro's headquarters in Rhode Island. The project had found the momentum based on the success of Transformers, which Bonaventura produced with Murphy. Sommers partly signed on to direct because the concept reminded him of James Bond, and he described an underwater battle in the story as a tribute to Thunderball. Stuart Beattie was hired to write a new script for Sommers's film, and G.I. Joe comic and filecard writer Larry Hama was hired as creative consultant. Hama helped them change story elements that fans would have disliked and made it closer to the comics, ultimately deciding fans would enjoy the script. He persuaded them to drop a comic scene at the film's end, where Snake Eyes speaks. To speed up production before the 2007–2008 Writers Guild of America strike, John Lee Hancock, Brian Koppelman and David Levien also assisted in writing various scenes. Goldner said their inspiration was generally Hama's comics and not the cartoon. Sommers said had it not been for the rich backstory in the franchise, the film would have fallen behind schedule because of the strike.

After Variety had reported that G.I. Joe became a Brussels-based outfit that stands for Global Integrated Joint Operating Entity, there were reports of outrages over Paramount's alleged attempt to change the origin of G.I. Joe Team. Hasbro responded on its G.I. Joe website claiming it was not changing what the G.I. Joe brand is about, and the name "G.I. Joe" will always be synonymous with bravery and heroism. Instead, it would be a modern telling of the "G.I. Joe vs. Cobra" storyline, based out of the "Pit" as they were throughout the 1980s comic book series.

=== G.I. Joe: Retaliation (2013) ===
The second film in the series, released on March 28, 2013, in 3D and IMAX 3D. It grossed $375 million worldwide. It was directed by Jon M. Chu from a screenplay written by Rhett Reese, and Paul Wernick.

For the second film, after the financially successful release of The Rise of Cobra, Rob Moore, the studio vice chairman of Paramount Pictures, stated in 2009 that a sequel would be developed. In January 2011, Rhett Reese and Paul Wernick, the writers of Zombieland, were hired to write the script for the sequel. The film was originally thought to be titled G.I. Joe: Cobra Strikes, which was later denied by Reese. Stephen Sommers was originally going to return as director of the sequel, but Paramount Pictures announced in February 2011 that Jon Chu would direct the sequel. In July 2011, the sequel's name was revealed to be G.I. Joe: Retaliation. Chu would later declare that Paramount wanted a reboot that also served as a sequel to The Rise of Cobra since "a lot of people saw the first movie so we don't want to alienate that and redo the whole thing."

=== Snake Eyes (2021) ===
In May 2018, Paramount announced a film centered on Snake Eyes, with Evan Spiliotopoulos hired to write the script. In December, Robert Schwentke signed on as director with principal photography scheduled to take place in Japan, Vancouver, British Columbia in Canada and Los Angeles, California. Ray Park was later reported to not reprise the role, as the film deals with the character's origin story. By August 2019, Henry Golding was cast as Snake Eyes, while Andrew Koji was set to portray Storm Shadow, replacing Lee Byung-hun, who portrayed the character in previous films. Kimani Ray Smith was hired as Stunt Coordinator on the project. In September 2019, Iko Uwais entered negotiations to portray Hard Master, while Úrsula Corberó was cast as Anastasia Cisarovna / Baroness (replacing Sienna Miller, who played the character in G.I. Joe: The Rise of Cobra). James Madigan was hired as the Second-Unit Director, after previously working on G.I. Joe: Retaliation. By October 2019, Samara Weaving was cast as Shana O'Hara / Scarlett (replacing Rachel Nichols, who previously portrayed the character in G.I. Joe: The Rise of Cobra), while Takehiro Hira, Haruka Abe and Steven Allerick were cast in an undisclosed roles.

The film was scheduled for an October 23, 2020 release date, and was delayed to July 23, 2021, due to the COVID-19 pandemic.

== Potential projects ==
=== Untitled reboot film (2028) ===
In February 2026, two separate treatments for a new G.I. Joe film had been pitched to Paramount, one written by Max Landis and the other by Danny McBride. In March 2026, it was announced that Paramount would pass on Landis' treatment and were still in talks with/awaiting scripts from other writers like McBride. McBride revealed to Josh Horowitz in an interview on his Happy, Sad, Confused podcast that his G.I. Joe movie will follow Duke and the team battling Cobra in their town of Springfield and won't be a comedy. He also announced that he written the script with Jeff Fradley and John Carcieri who their worked with on his HBO comedy series The Righteous Gemstones and will start filming in 2027 with McBride making his Directorial debut. Daniel Richtman reported that the studio are eyeing Bradley Cooper, Walton Goggins and Chris Pratt for roles after Chris Hemsworth has exited the movie for undisclosed reasons. Cooper was officially confirmed to play Duke in October 2026. In November 2026, it was announced that the film will be released in theaters on October 20, 2028.

=== Other projects in development ===
- Philip "Chuckles" Provost film: In November 2015, Paramount Pictures announced that the G.I. Joe series would feature further installments in the future with Akiva Goldsman creating a writers room of screenwriters to determine future projects. In August 2019, Paramount announced a spin-off film which will include Philip "Chuckles" Provost was in development. After completing the script for G.I. Joe: Ever Vigilant, Josh Appelbaum and André Nemec were hired as co-screenwriters.
- Lady Jaye film: In February 2021, a spin-off streaming television series centered around Alison Hart-Burnett / Lady Jaye was announced to be in development. It was intended to be an expansion of the G.I. Joe film series, and released as an Amazon Prime Video exclusive. Erik Oleson was hired at the time as showrunner, series creator, and executive producer; while Lorenzo di Benaventura was also attached as an executive producer. By May 2023 however, di Bonaventura stated that the television series was no longer happening. He and the studio are looking to expand the script for the pilot episode, and develop the story as a new feature film.

=== Potential shared universe ===
In December 2015, it was reported that Hasbro and Paramount were creating a cinematic universe that would combine G.I. Joe with fellow Hasbro properties Micronauts, Visionaries: Knights of the Magical Light, M.A.S.K., and Rom. In April 2016, The Hollywood Reporter stated that a writers' room was formed consisting of Michael Chabon, Brian K. Vaughan, Nicole Perlman, Cheo Coker, John Francis Daley, Jonathan Goldstein and others. Director D. J. Caruso said in January 2017 that a script was being written, but the writers' room disbanded six months later. The project has since remained in development.

== Cancelled films ==
- Snake Eyes follow-up: In May 2020, a follow-up film to Snake Eyes was originally announced to be in development, with a script co-written by Joe Shrapnel and Anna Waterhouse. Henry Golding was to reprise his role as Snake Eyes. Lorenzo di Bonaventura was to return as producer, while the project was to be a joint-venture production between Paramount Pictures, Metro-Goldwyn-Mayer, Entertainment One, and Di Bonaventura Pictures. These plans were cancelled following the critical and commercial failure of the first Snake Eyes film.
- Untitled G.I. Joe and the Transformers crossover: In March 2013, producer Lorenzo di Bonaventura announced that he would be interested in producing a G.I. Joe / Transformers crossover film. By July, G.I. Joe: Retaliation director Jon M. Chu stated that he is interested in directing the movie. In June 2014, di Bonaventura cast doubt on the project, while acknowledging that it is an ongoing possibility. The Transformers were initially written to be introduced at the end of G.I. Joe 3, but Paramount decided against this. In July 2021, while stating that Paramount Pictures has been hesitant to green-light production on the crossover, di Bonneventura declared that the project is "inevitable". In July 2021, the project was once again in active development. In June 2023, beginning with Rise of the Beasts the two franchises began to share continuity. Producer di Bonaventura stated that in future Transformers installments, actors from the G.I. Joe films may reprise their roles. The crossover would later be announced officially at CinemaCon 2024. Derek Connolly was hired to write the crossover film in June 2024. Di Bonaventura announced to Collider that the crossover would be the next film. In July 2025, Anthony Ramos, who starred in Transformers: Rise of the Beasts (2023), revealed the film's uncertain status in an interview with Screen Rant citing the Skydance-Paramount merger.
- G.I. Joe: Ever Vigilant: In April 2013, a third G.I. Joe film was announced, with the studio looking at the potential for it to be released in 3D format. Chu was initially hired to return to direct the third film, though the filmmaker left the project in favor of directing Jem and the Holograms instead. Producer di Bonaventura expressed interest in having Johnson and Willis reprise their respective roles, while announcing a third primary role. By September of the same year, Evan Daugherty was hired as screenwriter. The film was initially scheduled for a 2016 release, though this changed when di Bonaventura revealed that the studio was in search of a new director. By July 2014, Jonathan Lemkin was hired to contribute to the script, with a plot that will focus on Roadblock. Johnson signed on to return as the star of the film. The story will incorporate M.A.S.K. character Matt Trakker, and the villainous twins Tomax Paoli and Xamot Paoli. In April 2015, the studio hired D. J. Caruso as director, with Aaron Berg hired to do a re-write of the previous draft of the script. In January 2017, Caruso revealed that a previous draft of the script ended with the introduction of the Transformers. This was not approved by Paramount Pictures, who as a studio were "not ready...yet". In May, Dwayne Johnson stated that he would appear in any future G.I. Joe film, and that he hopes to be a part of the franchise expansion. In May 2018, the film was titled G.I. Joe: Ever Vigilant, with Josh Appelbaum and André Nemec signed on as co-screenwriters. Johnson is again in early negotiations to reprise his role, with the plot centering around his character leading a new team of Joes. That team features Daina Janack, Dr. Adele Burkhart, Wild Bill, Barbecue, General Flagg, Doc, and Keel-Haul; the primary antagonists are Tomax and Xamot. Cobra Commander has a smaller role. The film was scheduled to be released on March 27, 2020, until Snake Eyes took precedence and was given that release date. Due to the COVID-19 pandemic, the intended October 23, 2020 release of Snake Eyes was delayed, also delaying Ever Vigilant development. In May 2021, producer Lorenzo di Bonaventura revealed that there are multiple scripts for the sequel in development.

== Short films ==
=== G.I. Joe: The Invasion of Cobra Island - Part 1 (2009) ===
To promote the release of The Rise of Cobra, 2 short stop-motion films were created.

=== G.I. Joe: The Invasion of Cobra Island - Part 2 (2009) ===
A sequel to G.I. Joe: The Invasion of Cobra Island - Part 1.

=== Snake Eyes Has Something to Say... G.I. Joe Origins (2021) ===
Released in promotion for Snake Eyes, Paramount produced a stop-motion short film, including toys of the characters of the film where they discuss the upcoming movie as a reboot/prequel. The short debuted on the studio's YouTube channel.

=== Morning Light: A Weapon with Stories to Tell (2021) ===
The home video release of Snake Eyes, included a bonus feature short that debuted in the form of an animated motion comic. The plot detailed the origins of the character's weapon, Morning Light.

== Main cast and characters ==
List indicators

This section includes characters who will appear or have appeared in more than two films in the series.

- An empty grey cell indicates the character was not in the film, or that the character's official presence has not yet been confirmed.
- ^{A} indicates an appearance through archival footage or audio.
- ^{C} indicates a cameo role.
- ^{P} indicates an appearance in onscreen photographs.
- ^{U} indicates an uncredited appearance.
- ^{V} indicates a voice-only role.
- ^{Y} indicates a younger version of the character.

Characters	Films			Related film
Characters	G.I. Joe: The Rise of Cobra	G.I. Joe: Retaliation	Snake Eyes	Transformers: Rise of the Beasts
Characters	2009	2013	2021	2023
Snake Eyes	Ray Park Leo Howard^{Y}	Ray Park Leo Howard^{Y}^{A}	Henry Golding Max Archibald^{Y}	
Thomas "Tommy" Arashikage Storm Shadow	Byung-hun Lee Brandon Soo Hoo^{Y}	Byung-hun Lee Nathan Takashige^{Y}	Andrew Koji	
Hard Master	Gerald Okamura	Gerald Okamura^{A}	Iko Uwais	
Conrad S. Hauser Duke	Channing Tatum	Channing Tatum		
Rex Lewis Cobra Commander	Joseph Gordon-Levitt	Luke Bracey Robert Baker^{U}^{V}		
Zartan	Arnold Vosloo Jonathan Pryce^{C}	Jonathan Pryce Arnold Vosloo^{C}		
President of the United States	Jonathan Pryce	Jonathan Pryce		
Laird James McCullen XXIV Destro	Christopher Eccleston	Christopher Eccleston^{U}^{C}		
Shana O’Hara Scarlett	Rachel Nichols		Samara Weaving	
Ana Lewis The Baroness	Sienna Miller		Úrsula Corberó	
Blind Master		RZA	Peter Mensah	
Marvin Hinton Roadblock		Dwayne Johnson		
Wallace Weems Ripcord	Marlon Wayans			
Clayton M. Abernathy General Hawk	Dennis Quaid			
Hershel Dalton Heavy Duty	Adewale Akinnuoye-Agbaje			
Abel Shaz Breaker	Saïd Taghmaoui			
Brian Binder Doctor Mindbender	Kevin J. O'Connor			
Courtney Krieger Cover Girl	Karolína Kurková			
Geoffrey Stone IV Sgt. Stone	Brendan Fraser^{U}^{C}			
Joseph Colton G.I. Joe		Bruce Willis		
Jaye Burnett Lady Jaye		Adrianne Palicki		
Dashiell Faireborn Flint		D. J. Cotrona		
Kim Arashikage Jinx		Élodie Yung		
Firefly		Ray Stevenson		
Zandar Havoc		Matt Gerald		
Akiko			Haruka Abe	
Kenta			Takehiro Hira	
Noah Diaz				Anthony Ramos
Agent Burke				Michael Kelly

Film	Crew/Detail					
Film	Composer(s)	Cinematographer	Editor(s)	Production companies	Distributing company	Running time
G.I. Joe: The Rise of Cobra	Alan Silvestri	Mitchell Amundsen	Jim May; Bob Ducsay	Hasbro Studios; Sommers Company; Spyglass Entertainment di Bonaventura Pictures	Paramount Pictures	118 min
G.I. Joe: Retaliation	Henry Jackman	Stephen Windon	Jim May; Roger Barton	Hasbro Studios; Skydance Productions di Bonaventura Pictures	Paramount Pictures; Metro-Goldwyn-Mayer	123 min
Snake Eyes	Martin Todsharow	Bojan Bazelli	Stuart Levy	Skydance; Entertainment One di Bonaventura Pictures	Paramount Pictures; Metro-Goldwyn-Mayer	121 min

== Reception ==
=== Box office performance ===
Film	Release date	Box office revenue			Box office ranking		Budget	Reference
Film	Release date	United States	International	Worldwide	All time domestic	All time worldwide	Budget	Reference
G.I. Joe: The Rise of Cobra	August 7, 2009	$150,201,498	$152,267,519	$302,469,017	#	#	$175 million	
G.I. Joe: Retaliation	March 28, 2013	$122,523,060	$253,217,645	$375,740,705	#	#	$130 million	
Snake Eyes	July 22, 2021	$28,264,325	$11,800,000	$40,064,325	#	#	$88–110 million	
Total		$300,988,883	$417,285,164	$718,274,047	—N/a	#	$393–415 million	—N/a
List indicator^{(A)} indicates the adjusted totals based on current ticket prices (calculated by Box Office Mojo).

=== Critical and public response ===
Film	Rotten Tomatoes	Metacritic	CinemaScore
G.I. Joe: The Rise of Cobra	33% (169 reviews)	32 (25 reviews)	B+
G.I. Joe: Retaliation	29% (182 reviews)	41 (31 reviews)	A-
Snake Eyes	35% (147 reviews)	43 (32 reviews)	B-

== Other media ==
=== Comics ===
In addition to the films, various comic books were presented by IDW Publishing:

- G.I. Joe Movie Prequel (March – June 2009)
- G.I. Joe Movie Adaptation (July 2009)
- Snake Eyes (October 2009 – January 2010)
- G.I. Joe: Operation HISS (February – June 2010)
- G.I. Joe: Retaliation Movie Prequel (February – April 2012)

=== Video games ===
- G.I. Joe: The Rise of Cobra (August 4, 2009)

== See also ==
- Transformers (film series)
