= Jessica Sharzer =

American film director

Jessica Sharzer (born October 26, 1972) is an American screenwriter, director, producer, and editor.

She is known for her work on the Showtime drama series The L Word and the FX horror series American Horror Story. She wrote the screenplays for the films Nerve (2016), Dirty Dancing (2017), A Simple Favor (2018) and its sequel Another Simple Favor (2025).

== Life and career ==
She was born in Iowa City, Iowa to a Jewish family. She grew up in New York City, graduated from the Horace Mann School and Wesleyan University, and studied film at New York University.

Sharzer was all set for a career in academia, until she took a summer film course at New York Film Academy. Realizing then that she was "not meant for academia," Sharzer left Berkeley and enrolled in NYU Film School. In 2002, she won the school's Wasserman Award for her graduate thesis film, The Wormhole.

She was a crew member on the film Happiness, then went on to be an assistant director on the short film Billy Twist. She finished out the 1990s as a crew member on several short films.

She co-produced, directed, and co-wrote the screenplay for the 2004 independent film Speak, based on the novel of the same name. The film garnered her a nomination for a Writers Guild of America Award in children's television scriptwriting, a nomination for the Directors Guild of America Award for outstanding directorial achievement in children's programs, and won her the Woodstock Film Festival's Audience Award for best narrative feature.

In 2007, she directed an episode for the Showtime television drama, The L Word. She also wrote the 2010 television movie, Turn the Beat Around, which was produced by Paramount Pictures and MTV. In 2011, she became an episode writer and supervising producer for the serial horror-drama television series American Horror Story, created by Ryan Murphy and Brad Falchuk. The series airs on the cable television channel FX. The Horror Writers Association awarded her the 2011 Bram Stoker Award for Superior Achievement in a Screenplay for her episode "Afterbirth".

In 2016, she wrote the screenplay of the feature film Nerve, based on the novel of the same name, as well as the musical Dirty Dancing, a television remake of the 1987 hit film. She adapted Darcey Bell's novel A Simple Favor into a screenplay for a 2018 film of the same name.
