= A Simple Favor =

A Simple Favor may refer to:

- A Simple Favor (novel), 2017, by Darcey Bell
- A Simple Favor (film), 2018, based on the novel
