= Another Simple Favor =

2025 film by Paul Feig

- Promotional poster
- Directed by: Paul Feig
- Written by: Jessica Sharzer; Laeta Kalogridis
- Based on: Characters by Darcey Bell
- Produced by: Paul Feig; Laura Fischer
- Starring: Anna Kendrick; Blake Lively; Andrew Rannells; Bashir Salahuddin; Elizabeth Perkins; Michele Morrone; Elena Sofia Ricci; Henry Golding; Allison Janney
- Cinematography: John Schwartzman
- Edited by: Brent White
- Music by: Theodore Shapiro
- Production companies: Lionsgate; Feigco Entertainment
- Distributed by: Amazon MGM Studios
- Release dates: March 7, 2025 (SXSW); May 1, 2025 (United States)
- Running time: 120 minutes
- Country: United States
- Language: English

Another Simple Favor is a 2025 American black comedy mystery film directed by Paul Feig from a screenplay by Jessica Sharzer and Laeta Kalogridis. It is the sequel to A Simple Favor (2018), which in turn is based on the 2017 novel by Darcey Bell. Anna Kendrick, Blake Lively, Henry Golding, Andrew Rannells, Bashir Salahuddin, Kelly McCormack, Joshua Satine, and Ian Ho reprise their roles from the first film, with Michele Morrone, Elena Sofia Ricci, Alex Newell, and Allison Janney joining the cast, while Elizabeth Perkins replaces Jean Smart.

The film's development was announced in 2022 by Lionsgate in partnership with Amazon MGM Studios, and with Feig returning to direct, while Kendrick and Lively were confirmed to be reprising their roles. Production started in 2024, when it was also announced that the film will be released on Amazon Prime Video, despite the first film being released theatrically. Filming took place between March and May 2024 in Capri and at the Villa Adriana, in Italy.

Another Simple Favor premiered at the South by Southwest Festival on March 7, 2025, and was released on Amazon Prime Video on May 1. It received mixed reviews from critics.

== Plot ==
Five years after the first film, Stephanie Smothers is a famous true crime vlogger, an amateur detective and has written a book about her friendship with Emily Nelson and Emily’s subsequent imprisonment. At a book signing, Emily appears, as she is filing an appeal. Marrying her old friend Dante Versano, a wealthy Italian from a mafia-connected family, she asks Stephanie to be her maid of honor. Emily pressures her to accept, promising increased book sales and threatening a potential lawsuit.

Arriving in Capri with Dante and Stephanie's agent Vicky, they reunite with Emily's ex-husband Sean and son Nicky. Also there are Emily's mother Margaret and her aunt Linda, as well as Dante's mother Portia. The latter accuses her of marrying Dante for his money. At the pre-wedding lunch, bitter and intoxicated, Sean argues heatedly with Dante.

Stephanie and Emily reconnect at her "bachelorette party", where she is the only guest. Returning to the hotel, Stephanie finds Sean murdered in his hotel room, which local police write off as an "accident". Suspecting Emily's involvement, she follows her the next day, but an American tourist distracts her.

The 'tourist' is FBI agent Irene Walker, investigating Linda. She shows Stephanie a photo of Linda talking to a mysterious woman with Emily's tattoo. They are interrupted by Dante, who Stephanie later sees in a heated discussion with Matteo Bartolo, a Versanos' rival family member.

Emily and Dante are married. At the reception, he overtly burns their prenuptial agreement, declaring it a gesture of peace between the Versanos and the Bartolos. Later that evening, Stephanie follows Dante as he leaves the reception, only to witness him being shot dead.

Portia accuses Emily of the murder, while Linda casts suspicion on Matteo, who vehemently denies it. With Emily's presence accounted for, and Stephanie being the only murder witness, she is branded the prime suspect. She is placed under house arrest while the death is investigated.

Stephanie meets with Emily, but soon realizes from her odd behavior that she is Charity, the third of the triplets that included Emily and her late sister Faith. Charity stabs herself, then frames Stephanie. Isabella, a housekeeper paid by Irene, frees her from her captivity. Entering Margaret's room; she reveals that Charity's stillbirth was faked by Linda, a con artist who raised her as her own.

Leaving the hotel, Stephanie meets Irene. However, before she can reach a safehouse, Irene is fatally stabbed by Charity in disguise once again framing Stephanie. Meanwhile, Linda discovers from Margaret that Stephanie spoke with her, so smothers her with a pillow. Stephanie is taken to meet with Portia.

Portia injects Stephanie with sodium thiopental, convinced she and Emily conspired to kill Dante. Unable to get satisfactory answers, Portia orders her killed, but Emily rescues her. Linda had attempted to blackmail her and Dante, threatening to reveal their wedding was a marriage of convenience to hide Dante and Matteo's relationship.

Upon refusing, Charity confronts Emily. Obsessed with her, she killed both Sean and Dante. Charity drugged her and married Dante in her place, with Emily only escaping because Charity forgot to drug her.

Charity, posing as Emily, livestreams a coded threat via Stephanie's phone to Emily and Stephanie, threatening to kill Nicky if Stephanie does not turn herself in. Stephanie and Emily confront Charity and Linda, who have Nicky at gunpoint. Linda plans to kill Stephanie, pinning the murders on her, with Charity assuming Emily's life, money, and position with the Versanos. Stephanie points out that Emily will also have to die, which Charity rejects. In the ensuing commotion, Nicky flies a toy drone into Linda's face, allowing Charity to take her gun and shoot her, sending her over a cliff to her death.

Emily convinces Charity to take her place in prison and responsibility for all of the murders. Stephanie returns home, writing a second book about the Capri murders and honoring Emily's wish to give Nicky a normal life. Emily remains in hiding in Italy, where Portia approaches her. Revealing she knew Emily and Dante's marriage was a sham and she did not commit the murders, she welcomes Emily into the Versano family. Then, she requests "a simple favor", handing her an envelope.

== Cast ==
- Anna Kendrick as Stephanie Smothers, an author and Miles's mother
- Blake Lively as
  - Emily Nelson / Hope McLanden, Nicky's mother
  - Charity McLanden, Emily's identical triplet sister who she thought died at birth
- Henry Golding as Sean Townsend, Emily's ex-husband and Nicky's father
- Andrew Rannells as Darren, Stephanie's friend
- Bashir Salahuddin as Detective Ben Summerville
- Elizabeth Perkins as Margaret McLanden, Emily's mother. Perkins replaces Jean Smart, who portrayed the character in the first film.
  - Jade Pirovano as Young Margaret
- Michele Morrone as Dante Versano, Emily's fiancé
- Elena Sofia Ricci as Portia Versano, Dante's mother
- Allison Janney as Aunt Linda McLanden, Emily's maternal aunt and Margaret's older sister
  - Alessandra Pacifico Griffini as Young Linda
- Alex Newell as Vicky, Stephanie's book agent/assistant
- Taylor Ortega as Agent Irene Walker, an FBI agent who follows Stephanie
- Joshua Satine as Miles Smothers, Stephanie's son
- Ian Ho as Nicholas "Nicky" Townsend-Nelson, Emily and Sean's son
- Lorenzo de Moor as Matteo Bartolo
- Aparna Nancherla as Sona
- Kelly McCormack as Stacy
- Holmes as Camp Counselor Val
- Jake Tapper as himself
Director Paul Feig cameos as 'Emily'/Charity's lawyer at the end of the film

== Production ==
=== Pre-production ===
It was announced in May 2022 that Amazon MGM Studios and Lionsgate had greenlit a sequel to the 2018 film, with Paul Feig returning to direct, and Anna Kendrick and Blake Lively reprising their roles. The project would be again confirmed in March 2024, with Henry Golding and Andrew Rannells among the cast also reprising their roles from the first film, and Allison Janney among the new additions to the cast.

=== Filming ===
Principal photography began in late March 2024. It was previously set to begin in Fall 2023 in Capri and in the UNESCO World Heritage Site site of Villa Adriana, in Italy. Filming wrapped on May 26, 2024.

== Release ==
Another Simple Favor premiered at the South by Southwest Festival on March 7, 2025, and was released on Amazon Prime Video on May 1.

== Reception ==
=== Critical response ===
On the review aggregator website Rotten Tomatoes, 59% of 150 critics' reviews are positive, with an average rating of 5.4/10. The website's consensus reads: "Sailing through on the strength of its predecessor, Another Simple Favor is the perfect cocktail of mystery, intrigue, and sharp casting with a dash of well-timed comedy." Metacritic, which uses a weighted average, assigned the film a score of 54 out of 100, based on 25 critics, indicating "mixed or average" reviews.

Brian Tallerico of RogerEbert.com gave the film two and a half out of four stars and wrote, "Despite the change in subject from motherhood to the mafia, Another Simple Favor ends up largely the same as the first in terms of what works and what falters. Lively is once again fantastic, imbuing this character with a degree of captivating uncertainty that throws off the balance of the film when she's not on-screen, and the costumes are gorgeous, rising to the level of the stunning scenery." Matt Donato of TheWrap gave three out of five stars and wrote, "Another Simple Favor might not be Emily's perfection, chilled-glass martini, but that's fine. Like the everyday martinis Emily shakes in a jiffy, Feig's sexy and silly criminal caper goes down just fine."

In a more mixed review, Jacob Oller of The A.V. Club gave the film a C+ grade and wrote, "Though the simplest pleasures of Favor remain—catty chemistry between Kendrick and Lively, loopy twists, bravura statement outfits—the heat powering the concept has cooled to the extent that, despite the increased body count, the sequel feels as perfunctory as its title. It's just Another one."

=== Accolades ===
Award	Date of ceremony	Category	Recipient(s)	Result	Ref.
SXSW	March 15, 2025	Headliner (Audience Award)	Paul Feig	Nominated	
Astra TV Awards	June 10, 2025	Best Television Movie	Another Simple Favor	Nominated	

== Future ==
In an interview with People, Feig expressed interest for a third film. Kalogridis said that she "would love to get to spend time with these characters and these actors again."
