= Nerve (2016 film) =

2016 film by Henry Joost and Ariel Schulman

- Theatrical release poster
- Directed by: Henry Joost; Ariel Schulman
- Screenplay by: Jessica Sharzer
- Based on: Nerve by Jeanne Ryan
- Produced by: Allison Shearmur; Anthony Katagas
- Starring: Emma Roberts; Dave Franco; Juliette Lewis
- Cinematography: Michael Simmonds
- Edited by: Jeff McEvoy; Madeleine Gavin
- Music by: Rob Simonsen
- Production companies: Allison Shearmur Productions; Keep Your Head Productions
- Distributed by: Lionsgate
- Release dates: July 12, 2016 (SVA Theater); July 27, 2016 (United States)
- Running time: 96 minutes
- Country: United States
- Language: English
- Budget: $19 million
- Box office: $85.3 million

Nerve is a 2016 American techno-thriller adventure film directed by Henry Joost and Ariel Schulman, and written by Jessica Sharzer, based on the 2012 novel. The film stars Emma Roberts, Dave Franco, and Juliette Lewis, and revolves around an online dare game, which allows people to enlist as "players" or "watchers", and as the game progresses, the players are contacted and invited to participate in more dangerous dares than their prior ones.

The film premiered at the SVA Theater on July 12, 2016, and was released theatrically in the United States on July 27 by Lionsgate. It received mixed reviews from critics and grossed $85 million against a $19 million budget.

== Plot ==
High school senior Venus "Vee" Delmonico longs to leave Staten Island for college, but is reluctant to tell her single mother because they continue to mourn the recent death of Vee's older brother and the price of college. Her friend Sydney is popular on Nerve, an online reality game in which users either enlist as "players" or pay to watch as "watchers". Players accept dares given by the watchers in order to receive money and a spot in the final.

After Sydney chastises Vee's unadventurous nature, Vee decides to sign up as a player on Nerve. Her first dare is to kiss a random stranger. At a diner, she kisses Ian, who dances and sings to Vee, revealing he is another player on a dare. The watchers dare Ian to take Vee to Manhattan, and together, they travel to Manhattan. After their first dare of trying on expensive clothes, the fear of her mom catching her in the city gets to her and she decides it's time to go back to Staten Island. However, with the encouragement of Ian to step out of her comfort zone, and the next dare's cash prize, Vee continues to play the game. Thus, together they complete several dares: Vee gets a tattoo, and Ian drives his motorcycle at 60 mph blindfolded. This, as well as Vee and Ian's chemistry, allows them to become two of the top players.

Jealous of Vee's popularity on Nerve, Sydney accepts a dare at a party to cross a ladder between two buildings, but she bails during the dare and is eliminated from Nerve. Vee arrives at the party and catches Sydney making out with J.P, a boy Vee has a crush on. As they argue, Vee discovers from her hacker friend Tommy that Ian was dared into bringing Vee to the party and incite an argument between her and Sydney.

Vee receives a dare to complete Sydney's dare of crossing the ladder between the two buildings, which she completes. Realizing how dangerous Nerve is, Vee attempts to report the game to the police but is disbelieved. As a result, all of the money in her and her mother's joint bank account is removed. Nerve player Ty knocks Vee out in order to keep her in the game.

Vee wakes up in a shipping container, where she finds Ian, who confesses that he and Ty were players whose friend was killed in a dare in Seattle. When they tried to alert the authorities, their families' jobs, bank accounts, and identities were compromised. Vee has joined them in the secret third category of the game: "prisoners". If a prisoner can reach and win the day's final round, they regain everything.

Tommy and Sydney work with Tommy's hacker friends to try and disable Nerve by altering the game's online code. They hope to prevent Vee from playing the game, but since all of the watchers' phones and profiles act as a distributed server, they cannot completely disable Nerve.

Vee wins a spot in the final of Nerve, and Ian completes a dare to also gain a spot in the final, which takes place at Battery Weed. At the final, Vee and Ian are dared to shoot each other with guns, which they both refuse to do. Ty then takes Ian's place in the final and proposes a vote on whether or not he should shoot Vee. The watchers vote yes by a majority, to which Ty shoots Vee, who seemingly dies in Ian's arms.

Tommy and his hackers are able to modify Nerve's source code to decrypt the watchers' usernames into their real names and send them a message: "You are an accessory to murder." The panicked watchers log out of the game, closing all the servers and ending Nerve. Despondent over Vee's apparent death, Ian aims his gun at Ty, but Vee stops him, revealing that she and Ty staged her murder to scare the watchers into shutting down their profiles on Nerve and ending it permanently. Tommy and his hackers manage to restore the money to all of the players. As Vee and Ian watch the sunrise, he reveals his true name to be Sam.

A few months later, Vee and Sydney have reconciled, while Vee and Sam are a couple. Vee is attending the California Institute of the Arts and asks Sam to come and see her in person.

== Cast ==
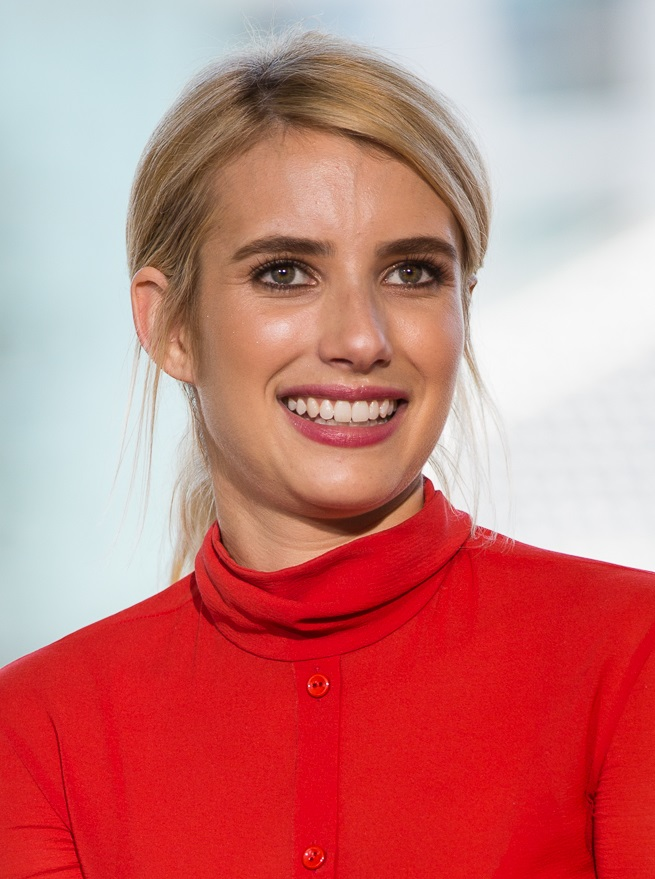
Emma Roberts (pictured in 2016) portrays Venus/Vee

- Emma Roberts as Venus/Vee, a player of Nerve
- Dave Franco as Ian / Sam, Vee's fellow player
- Emily Meade as Sydney / Syd, Vee's best friend
- Miles Heizer as Tommy, one of Vee's friends who has an unrequited crush on her
- Juliette Lewis as Nancy, Vee's mother
- Kimiko Glenn as Liv, one of Vee's friends
- Marc John Jefferies as Wes, one of Vee's friends
- Colson Baker as Ty, Vee's main opponent in the game
- Brian Marc as J.P. Guerrero, Vee's high school crush
- Ed Squires as Chuck, J.P.'s varsity teammate
- Samira Wiley as Hacker Kween, one of Tommy's hacker friends
- Chloe Wise as herself, another player
- Casey Neistat as himself, another player

== Production ==
Directors Ariel Schulman and Henry Joost had previously dealt with similar themes in their documentary Catfish. On their attraction to a film based around the Internet, they stated, "Most things aren't black and white. The Internet is neither good nor bad; it just depends on how you use it", giving the example that the Nerve game could be both "a really empowering game, and it's also the most awful thing that you can possibly imagine". The directors strived for a PG-13 rating, with Schulman stating "we wanted to make sure that younger teenagers could see it. We think it has an important message and they'll dig it", with Joost adding "We weren't interested in making a gross torture movie". In trying to keep the rating down, the directors axed a "sex dare" that "was ultimately just too dark and weird". The film has also a lighter ending and theme than the book, as the novel deals with a much darker plot and ending. The team stated that the fast-changing nature of the Internet made it a tough subject to make a narrative feature about, with Joost noting that the app Periscope came out during the film development, which Joost called "like half-way to being Nerve".

In January 2015, it was announced that Emma Roberts and Dave Franco were set to star in the film. In April 2015, it was announced that Kimiko Glenn had joined the cast of the film, portraying the role of Roberts' character's worried friend. The same day, it was announced that rapper Colson "Machine Gun Kelly" Baker had also joined the cast.

=== Filming ===
Principal photography began on April 13, 2015, in New York City. Production on the film concluded on June 5, 2015.

== Release ==
Nerve premiered at the SVA Theater in New York City on July 12, 2016, where the cast attended. It was also screened on July 21 at Comic-Con. The film was originally scheduled to be released theatrically in the United States on September 16, 2016, but was moved up to July 27, 2016.

== Reception ==
=== Box office ===
Nerve grossed $38.6 million in the United States and Canada, and $46.7 million in other countries, for a worldwide total of $85.3 million, against a budget of $19 million.

The film was projected to gross around $10 million on its opening weekend and $15 million over its first five days from 2,538 theaters. The film grossed $3.7 million on its opening day and ended up finishing eighth at the box office on its opening weekend, grossing $9.4 million (a five-day total of $15.5 million).

=== Critical response ===
On the review aggregator website Rotten Tomatoes, the film holds an approval rating of 66% based on 143 reviews, with an average rating of 5.8/10. The website's critics consensus reads, "Nerve's fast pace and charming leads help overcome a number of fundamental flaws, adding up to a teen-friendly thriller with enough energy to occasionally offset its muddled execution." Metacritic, which uses a weighted average, assigned the film a score of 58 out of 100, based on 33 critics, indicating "mixed or average reviews". Audiences polled by CinemaScore gave the film an average grade of "A−" on an A+ to F scale.

Scott Tobias of Uproxx wrote, "Though the ending surrenders to a tsk-tsk-ing morality play that turns on the mob the game (and the film) has so smartly orchestrated, Nerve is the rare virtual thriller that understands how social media actually works and the addictive little subcultures that can spin out of it." David Palmer of The Reel Deal gave the film 7/10, saying, "It is a lot of fun, and not even in a turn-your-brain off kind of way. The film actually has some smart things to say about teenagers, their phones and what people will do to get internet famous and it is all delivered in a colorful little package."

=== Accolades ===
The film was nominated at the People's Choice Awards in the category "Favorite Thriller Movie".
