= Kimiko Glenn =

American actress (born 1989)

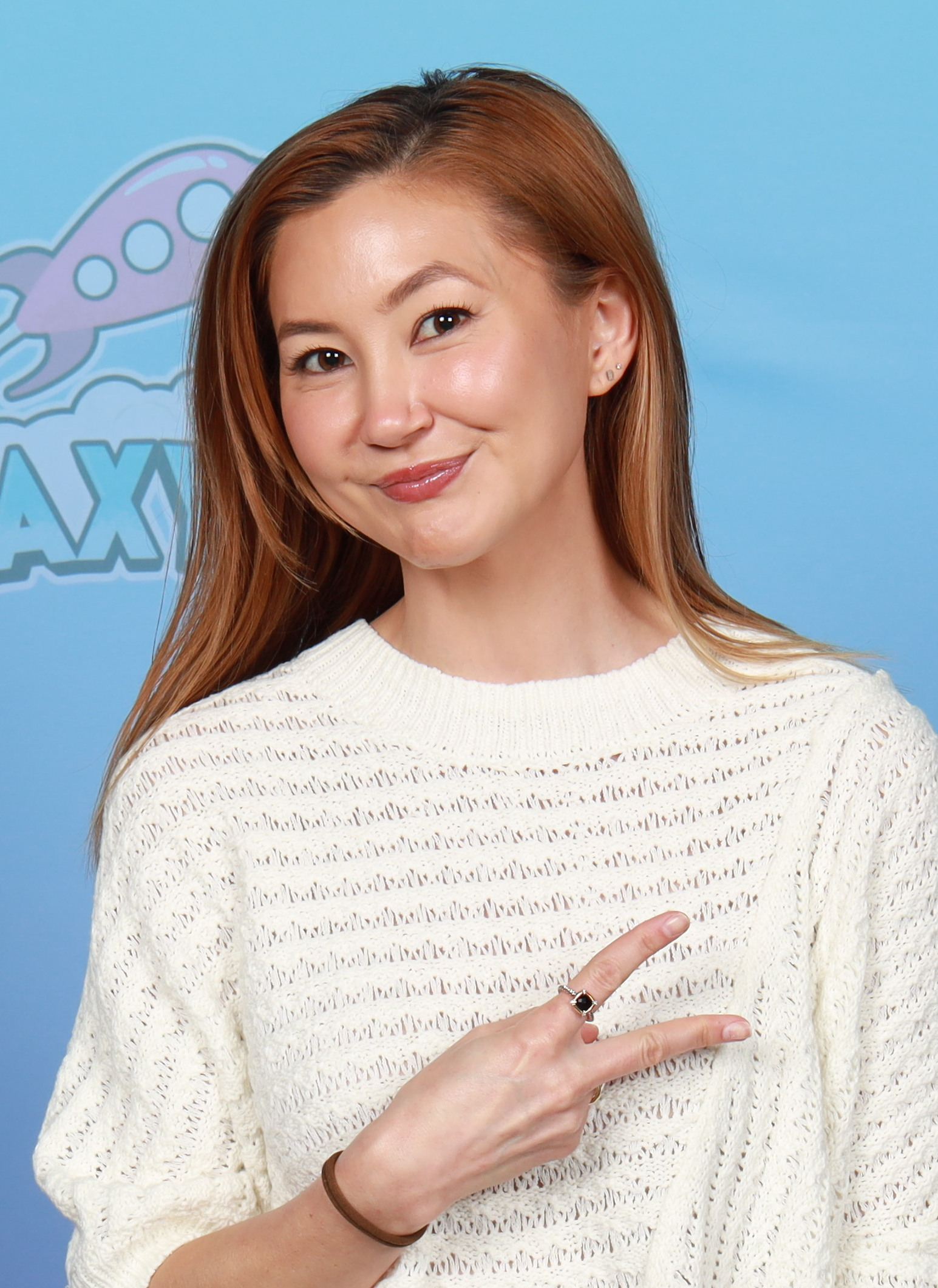
- Glenn at GalaxyCon San Jose in 2025
- Born: June 27, 1989 (age 37); Phoenix, Arizona, U.S.
- Other name: KIMIKO
- Education: Boston Conservatory
- Occupations: Actress; singer
- Years active: 2008–present

Kimiko Glenn (born June 27, 1989) is an American actress and singer, best known in a live action role for portraying Brook Soso in the Netflix series Orange Is the New Black (2014–2019), for which she received three ensemble Screen Actors Guild Awards. She also originated the role of Dawn Pinkett in the Broadway musical Waitress in 2016. Glenn concurrently acted in the thriller film Nerve (2016) and voiced Peni Parker in the animated Spider-Verse trilogy (2018–present). She has also voiced roles in a number of other animated media, including the film Over the Moon (2020) and television projects such as DuckTales (2017–2021), Voltron: Legendary Defender (2017–2018), Summer Camp Island (2018–2023), Kiff (2023–present), Hazbin Hotel (2024–present), and Among Us (2026).

== Early life and education ==
Kimiko Glenn was born on June 27, 1989, and raised in Phoenix, Arizona, with her sister, Amanda. Her mother, Sumiko, is Japanese, and her father, Mark, is of Scottish, Irish, and German descent. Glenn began acting at the Valley Youth Theatre in Phoenix and several other local theaters when she was in fifth grade. She attended Desert Vista High School in Phoenix and the Interlochen Arts Academy boarding school in Interlochen, Michigan. She is a 2007 YoungArts alumnus. She attended the Boston Conservatory for a year as a musical theatre major, but dropped out when she was cast in the touring company of Spring Awakening.

== Career ==
=== Acting career ===
During her freshman year of college, in 2008, Glenn was cast as Thea in the first U.S. national tour of Steven Sater's and Duncan Sheik's rock musical Spring Awakening. In 2013, she booked her breakthrough role as Litchfield Penitentiary inmate Brook Soso in the Netflix comedy-drama series Orange Is the New Black, for which she received Screen Actors Guild Awards in 2014, 2015, and 2016 for Outstanding Performance by an Ensemble in a Comedy Series.

In 2014, Glenn appeared in the Lena Dunham-directed music video "I Wanna Get Better" for Jack Antonoff's solo project Bleachers.

Glenn played the supporting role of Liv Kurosawa in the drama-thriller film Nerve (2016), directed by Henry Joost and Ariel Schulman and based on the young adult novel of the same name. In 2016, she was cast as Dawn Pinkett in the Broadway transfer production of the musical Waitress. The show began preview performances on March 25, 2016, at the Brooks Atkinson Theatre, and officially opened on April 24.

In 2018, Glenn began starring as Harlow in the comedy Web television series Liza on Demand, with Travis Coles and creator Liza Koshy. In 2019, she was a guest presenter with Nev Schulman on the MTV show Catfish.

In 2021, Glenn provided the voice of Izzy Moonbow in the Netflix animated film My Little Pony: A New Generation.

In 2023, Glenn began voicing Kiff Chatterley, the eponymous protagonist of the Disney Channel animated original series Kiff.

In 2024, Glenn began voicing Niffty and Susan in Hazbin Hotel.

=== Musical career ===
Glenn began releasing music under the stage name KIMIKO in July 2025.

Glenn released her debut single "Oh Honey" on July 2, 2025. Glenn released the single "Hang Out Forever?" on November 14, 2025. The official music video was released the same day and the lyric video was released on November 21, 2025.

== Personal life ==
Glenn is a pescatarian. In 2023, she spoke out on social media about unfair residuals during the SAG-AFTRA strike, revealing that she had been paid only $27.30 in royalties after appearing in 44 episodes of the Netflix series Orange Is the New Black. She was in a relationship with Sean Grandillo.

== Filmography ==
=== Film ===
Year	Title	Role	Notes
2012	Nous York	Saleswoman	
2012	Galaxy Comics	Tina	Short film
2012	Hair Brained	Perky Girl	
2015	Construction	Erin	
2016	Nerve	Liv Kurosawa	
2018	Like Father	Geena	
2018	Spider-Man: Into the Spider-Verse	Peni Parker (voice)	
2019	Can You Keep a Secret?	Gemma	
2020	Over the Moon	Auntie Mei, Lulu (voice)	
2021	My Little Pony: A New Generation	Izzy Moonbow (voice)	
2023	Spider-Man: Across the Spider-Verse	Peni Parker (voice)	Cameo
2023	Baby Shark's Big Movie!	Baby Shark (voice)	
2027	Spider-Man: Beyond the Spider-Verse	Peni Parker (voice)	In production

=== Television ===
Year	Title	Role	Notes
2013	Holding Patterns	Daisy Berger	Unsold NBC pilot
2014	Submissions Only	Katie Summers	Episode: "Reason to Stay"
2014	Law & Order: Special Victims Unit	Lily Deng	Episode: "Thought Criminal"
2014	Seriously Distracted	Katie	Episode: "Nightmare Client"
2014–2019	Orange Is the New Black	Brook Soso	45 episodes Screen Actors Guild Award for Outstanding Performance by an Ensemble in a Comedy Series (2014–2016)
2015	Married	Miranda	4 episodes
2015	Broad City	Cashier	Episode: "Kirk Steele"
2016	We Bare Bears	Samantha (voice)	Episode: "Fashion Bears"
2016	High Maintenance	Kimiko	Episode: "Selfie"
2016–2019	BoJack Horseman	Stefani Stilton (voice)	8 episodes
2017	Sofia the First	Cinder (voice)	Episode: "The Royal Dragon"
2017–2018	Voltron: Legendary Defender	General Ezor (voice)	
2017–2021	DuckTales	Lena Sabrewing (voice)	Recurring role
2018	Drunk History	Maya Lin	Episode: "Underdogs"
2018	The Guest Book	Nikki	Series regular (season 2)
2018–2020	Elena of Avalor	Tomiko (voice)	2 episodes
2018–2023	Summer Camp Island	Margot (voice)	16 episodes
2019	Welcome to the Wayne	Katherine Alice (voice)	2 episodes
2019	Carmen Sandiego	Paperstar (voice)	Recurring role
2019	Catfish: The TV Show	Herself	Episode: "Matthew & Chance"
2019	The Lion Guard	Chuluun (voice), Lumba-Lumba (singing voice)	7 episodes
2019	Ghosting: The Spirit of Christmas	Kara	Television film
2020–2022	Close Enough	Bridgette Hashima / Herself (voice)	Series regular
2020–2025	Baby Shark's Big Show!	Baby Shark (voice)	English dub, main role
2021	Centaurworld	Horse (voice)	Lead role; 18 episodes
2021	Dogs in Space	Nomi / Sophie (voice)	
2021	Beebo Saves Christmas	Tweebo (voice)	Television special
2021–2025	Star Wars: Visions	Lah Kara (voice)	Short film: The Ninth Jedi and The Ninth Jedi: Child of Hope: English language dub
2022	Bubble Guppies	Baby Shark (voice)	Episode: "The Jaw-some Sharkventure!"
2023	The Goldbergs	Lauren	2 episodes
2023	Star Trek: Lower Decks	Madame G (voice)	Episode: "Something Borrowed, Something Green"
2023–present	Kiff	Kiff Chatterley (voice)	Main role
2023–present	Chibiverse	Kiff Chatterley (voice)	Main role
2024–present	Hazbin Hotel	Niffty, Susan (voice)	Series regular
2024	Krapopolis	Makenzus (voice)	Episode: "Salt"
2024	Kiff's Animal Kingdom	Kiff Chatterley (voice)	Television special
2024	The Legend of Vox Machina	Young Anna Ripley (voice)	Episode: "Cloak and Dagger"
2025	Ishura	Cuneigh the Wanderer (voice)	English dub; main role
2025	Pokémon Horizons – The Search for Laqua	Perrin (voice)	English dub; 4 episodes
2026	American Dad!	Kricket Lemoine (voice)	Episode: "Reaper Madness"
2026	Among Us	Cyan (voice)	Series regular
2026	Sofia the First: Royal Magic	Trixie (voice)	Episode: "Tricky Trixie"

=== Music videos ===
Year	Title	Artist
2014	"I Wanna Get Better"	Bleachers

=== Theatre ===
Year	Title	Role	Location(s)
2008–2010	Spring Awakening	Thea	Various (national tour)
2010–2011	Freckleface Strawberry	Emily	New World Stages
2012	Yoshimi Battles the Pink Robots	Yoshimi Yasukawa	La Jolla Playhouse
2013	Love's Labour's Lost	Lady Maria	Delacorte Theater
2016	Waitress	Dawn Pinkett	Lena Horne Theatre
2026	Good Guy with a Gun!	Jenna Barkley	Concept album

=== Web ===
Year	Title	Role	Notes
2018–2021	Liza on Demand	Harlow	Main role
2023	How NOT to Draw	Kiff Chatterley (voice)	Main role
2023	Theme Song Takeover	Kiff Chatterley (voice)	Main role
2024	Broken Karaoke	Kiff Chatterley (voice)	Main role
2025	Disney Roadtrip	Kiff Chatterley (voice)	Main role
2026	Cartoonified! with Kiff	Kiff Chatterley (voice)	Main role
2026	Strawberry Vampire	Ursula	Indie animated series
