= Malaya Drew =

American actress

- Born: Malaya Rivera Drew; February 6, 1987 (age 39); Washington, D.C., United States
- Education: London Academy of Music and Dramatic Art
- Occupation: Actress
- Years active: 2002–present
- Spouse: David Kline

Malaya Rivera Drew (born February 6, 1987) is an American stage, film and television actress. Drew is best known for her role as Adele Channing on the cable television series The L Word (2008) and for her role as Katey Alvaro on NBC's long-running ER (2006–2007). She has had recurring roles on Entourage (2005), Las Vegas (2006–2007). American Horror Story (2011), The Originals (2013), Mayans M.C. (2019) and Good Trouble (2021-2022), as well as notable roles on stage and in film. In film she has appeared in many independent films, as well as playing Gabriella Forester in the 2016 Academy Award nominated Three Billboards Outside Ebbing Missouri. She also narrates the scripted podcast “The Don” for I Heart Radio, currently in its second season.

== Early life ==
Drew was born in Washington, D.C. and attended Woodrow Wilson High School (Washington, D.C.). She has two brothers, and her parents are both progressive lawyers. She attended Middlebury College where she studied English Literature and Spanish. After graduating college, she moved to London and trained at the London Academy of Music and Dramatic Art. She left school a term early when she was cast in the world premiere of Neil LaBute's The Distance from Here directed by David Leveaux at the Almeida Theatre .

== Career ==
She has appeared on television shows including Law and Order: SVU and CSI: Miami. On CSI she played a character who was originally named Colleen Mitchell but after the producers cast Drew, they changed the character's name to Colleen Mendoza, to reflect Drew's mixed heritage. She also played Angelica Sandoval on The Inside with Peter Coyote and Rachel Nichols, for the Fox network.

In 2005 she recurred on the HBO series Entourage and from 2006–2007 she starred on the NBC show Las Vegas, playing a new member of the Montecito Casino team with James Lesure, Josh Duhamel and James Caan. While she was still working on Las Vegas, she played new medical student Katey Alvaro on ER. Alvaro is doing her residency in the ER and has an affair with another doctor, played by Shane West. She was on ER during seasons 13 and 14.

In 2008, she played Adele Channing in the fifth season The L Word, a character modeled after Eve Harrington in the movie All About Eve (1950), starring Bette Davis . In 2010 she played Mia Sherman in the pilot True Blue for CBS, which was not picked up to series. In 2011, she recurred as Detective Barrios on American Horror Story opposite Jessica Lange.

In 2013, she was cast as the witch Jane-Anne Deveraux who is considered a martyr by her coven in the CW pilot, The Originals, a spin-off from another CW series, The Vampire Diaries. She first appeared as Jane- Anne on The Vampire Diaries and then continued the role on the series The Originals.

In 2014, she played Neera in the pilot Galyntine with Peter Fonda, Laura Harrier and Sterling K Brown. The pilot was not picked up to series.

In 2019 she recurred as Ileana in Mayans MC season 3, having auditioned for the role in both English and Spanish.

In 2021 she was cast on the third season of Good Trouble as Lucia Morales, playing a progressive freshman City Councilmember who is in a love triangle with Malika. She is currently filming season 4.

Alongside her TV work, she has appeared in many independent films. She played Gabriella Forrester in the Academy Award nominated Three Billboards Outside Ebbing Missouri, for which she was recognized with a SAG Award for Best Ensemble. She also narrates the scripted podcast “The Don” for I Heart Radio. The first season aired in 2021 and I Heart Radio has ordered two more seasons.

== Personal life ==
Drew is married to screenwriter David Kline. They live in Los Angeles.

== In the media ==
In 2008, Drew was voted one of Maxim's "100 Hottest Girls of Entourage" (No. 19). In 2009, she was voted one of ER's "Hottest Doctors of All Time" (No. 2).

== Filmography ==
=== Film ===
Year	Title	Role	Notes
2013	Here Comes the Night	Elena	
2014	Girltrash: All Night Long	Lauren	
2014	Audrey	Nicki	
2017	Three Billboards Outside Ebbing, Missouri	Gabriella	
2019	Crypto	Penelope Rushing	

=== Television ===
Year	Title	Role	Notes
2003	Law & Order: Special Victims Unit	Suzie Fleckner	Episode: "Privilege"
2004	CSI: Miami	Colleen Mendoza	Episode: "Pirated"
2004	Entourage	Carla	Episodes: "The Boys Are Back in Town", "The Abyss"
2006	The Inside	Angelica Sandavol	Episode: "Gem"
2006-2007	Las Vegas	Shannon	6 episodes
2006-2007	ER	Katey Alvaro	11 episodes
2008	The L Word	Adele Channing	11 episodes
2008	Life	Anna	Episode: "Evil... and His Brother Ziggy"
2010	True Blue	Mia Sherman	Unsold television pilot
2011	American Horror Story: Murder House	Detective Barrios	Episodes: "Smoldering Children", "Afterbirth"
2013	The Vampire Diaries	Jane-Anne Deveraux	Episode: "The Originals"
2013	The Glades	Jojo Cabrillo	Episode: "Shot Girls"
2013	The Originals	Jane-Anne Deveraux	Episodes: "Always and Forever", "Sinners and Saints"
2014	Galyntine	Neera	Unsold television pilot
2014	Married	Eva	Episode: "Halloween"
2018	The Resident	Naomi	Episode: "About Time"
2019	Charmed	Cyd	Episode: "You're Dead to Me"
2019	Mayans M.C.	Ileana	5 episodes Credited as Malaya Rivera-Drew
2019	S.W.A.T.	Trisha	Episode: "Sea Legs"
2021	All Rise	Raea Figueroa	Episode: "Hear My Voice"
2021-2024	Good Trouble	Lucia Morales	16 episodes
2022	Fatal Fandom	Colette	Television film (Lifetime)

=== Other work ===
Year	Title	Role	Notes
2003	Midnight Club II	Julie	Video game
2019	Front Row Flynn	Herself (voice)	Episode: "CRYPTO Premiere and Q&A: Beau Knapp, Luke Hemsworth, Malaya Rivera Drew, John Stahlberg, David Frigerio, Carlyle Eubank, Zac Weinstein, Brian Berman, Nima Fakhrara, moderator FX Feeney"
2022	The Don: Don Simpson	Narrator	Podcast series
2024	10 Rules for the Perfect Murder	Additional Voices	Podcast series
