= Afterbirth (American Horror Story) =

- American Horror Story episode
- Episode no.: Season 1 Episode 12
- Directed by: Bradley Buecker
- Written by: Jessica Sharzer
- Production code: 1ATS11
- Original air date: December 21, 2011
- Running time: 52 minutes

Guest appearances
- Kate Mara as Hayden McClaine; Charles S. Dutton as Detective Granger; Frances Conroy as Moira O'Hara; Alexandra Breckenridge as Young Moira; Lily Rabe as Nora Montgomery; Christine Estabrook as Marcy; Michael Graziadei as Travis Wanderley; Anthony Ruivivar as Miguel Ramos; Lisa Vidal as Stacy Ramos; Malaya Rivera Drew as Detective Barrios; David Anthony Higgins as Stan; Brennan Mejia as Gabriel Ramos; Rebecca Wisocky as Lorraine Harvey; Kyle Davis as Dallas; Azura Skye as Fiona; Jamie Brewer as Adelaide Langdon; Meredith Scott Lynn as Helen; Mena Suvari as Elizabeth Short

Episode chronology
← Previous "Birth"	Next → "Welcome to Briarcliff"
- American Horror Story: Murder House

"Afterbirth" is the twelfth and final episode of the first season of the television series American Horror Story and the season finale, which premiered on FX on December 21, 2011. The episode was written by Jessica Sharzer and directed by Bradley Buecker. Due to a very aggressive production schedule it was previously announced that the show's first season would be cut short.

In the aftermath of a family tragedy, Ben (Dylan McDermott) tries to take his child out of the Murder House. Meanwhile, Violet (Taissa Farmiga) and Vivien (Connie Britton) accustom themselves to their new living arrangements, Constance (Jessica Lange) raises Tate's child as her own and a new family buys the house. Kate Mara and Charles S. Dutton guest star as Hayden McClaine and Detective Granger, respectively.

The episode was well received by the majority of television critics and viewership and ratings for the episode reached a season high with 3.22 million. It garnered a 1.7 rating in the 18–49 demographic, according to Nielsen Media Research. This episode is rated TV-MA (LSV).

== Plot ==
After Vivien's death, Ben attempts to find her and Violet in the house. He goes to see Constance, who has been taking care of the baby since Vivien's death, and discovers that she is Tate's mother. He threatens her and leaves. Vivien resolves to not show herself to Ben, afraid that he would want to stay in the house.

Ben contemplates suicide, but Vivien stops him. He then reconciles with Vivien and Violet's ghosts, who encourage him to start a new life with the baby away from the house. However, Hayden hangs him from a chandelier, making it look like suicide. Hayden takes the baby, but Constance reclaims it. She tells the police that she found Ben after he hanged himself and that Violet must have run off with the baby.

When a new family, the Ramoses, moves in, Vivien, Ben, Moira, and other ghosts resolve to scare them, as to make them leave the house. Tate attempts to kill the Ramoses' son, Gabriel, thinking he might be a better boyfriend for Violet. Violet stops Tate, and distracts him to allow Gabriel to escape with his family.

Tate seeks counsel from Ben, who wants nothing to do with him. Tate finally takes responsibility for his actions and apologizes, before asking for Ben's friendship, although Ben declares he cannot absolve him of his sins.

Vivien finds Nora taking care of the Harmon baby, who took one breath in the house, meaning he is now a ghost. Nora returns the baby to Vivien after realizing that she isn't meant to be a mother. Moira accepts Vivien's offer to be the baby's godmother, and the baby is named Jeffrey.

After that, the Harmons and Moira decorate the house for Christmas, while Tate tells Hayden he'll wait forever for Violet to forgive him.

Three years later, Constance returns home from the hairdresser and sees a trail of blood on the floor, leading to the bedroom of her grandson Michael, the Antichrist, now about three years old and looking a lot like Tate. He has murdered his nanny and is sitting in a rocking chair, smiling. Constance looks at him with pride and smiles as she says, "Now what am I gonna do with you?".

== Production ==
What you saw in the finale was the end of the Harmon house. The second season of the show will be a brand-new home or building to haunt. Just like this year, every season of this show will have a beginning, middle and end. [The second season] won't be in L.A. It will obviously be in America, but in a completely different locale."

— Murphy on American Horror Story's second season.

The episode was written by consulting producer Jessica Sharzer and directed by Bradley Buecker. Due to a "very aggressive" production schedule and the series' pilot shoot having to wait for co-creators Ryan Murphy and Brad Falchuk's other show, Glee, to wrap its second season production, it was announced that the show's first-season finale would be thirty minutes shorter than planned. An option was given to Murphy by the network to drop the thirteenth episode altogether and air an hour-long finale, but Murphy came up with a plan for a ninety-minute episode.

After the episode aired, Murphy spoke of his plans to change the cast and location for the second season. He did say, however, that some actors who starred in the first season would be returning. He announced, "The people that are coming back will be playing completely different characters, creatures, monsters, etc. [The Harmons'] stories are done. People who are coming back will be playing entirely new characters."

In an interview with Entertainment Weekly, Murphy commented on the structure of the series' first season. "I loved how it began. I loved it in the middle and I loved the end. The only thing really frustrating for me, to be honest with you, is that sometimes people would write this idea that we were making it up as we went along and I wanted to say, 'Really?' But I think now people are writing and saying, 'Oh yeah!' I'm excited for people to see it on DVD, because now that they know how it ended, [they can] go back and see all of the little things, like people who have no reflections in mirrors. When you go back, you will see everything was set up." When asked if the House "pulled" the Harmons to it, Murphy responded, "I don't know if they were targeted. I don't think the Internet site had any supernatural pull to it...although that would have been hilarious. I thought it was two things: it was house porn because I think that house really is extraordinary. And also I think there's always that allure in American lives of the fresh start, moving West, starting fresh."

== Reception ==
In its original American broadcast, "Afterbirth" was seen by an estimated 3.22 million household viewers and earned a 1.7 rating share among adults aged 18–49, according to Nielsen Media Research, its highest numbers of the season. The first season tied with the TNT series Falling Skies as the biggest new cable series of the year among adults 18–49.

Rotten Tomatoes reports an 83% approval rating, based on 12 reviews. The critical consensus reads, ""Afterbirth" is an enjoyable season finale that manages to deliver a few last minute scares as it ties up loose ends." James Queally from The Star-Ledger commented about the season and its finale, "After a wildly uneven first nine episodes... and two red-hot episodes leading up to the finale... "Afterbirth" starts out flying high at the way too fast pace that has made American Horror Story an enjoyable ride these past two weeks. But somewhere in the final 30 minutes of this episode, "Afterbirth" turns into a wandering epilogue." Emily VanDerWerff of The A.V. Club stated, "Part of the fun of those early episodes – even when I really didn't like them – was that you never quite had a good sense of what the hell kind of show you were watching. The finale sticks us into what seems to be a pretty basic setup for season two." Tim Stack of Entertainment Weekly called "Afterbirth" "an exhilarating shocker." Matt Fowler at IGN gave the episode a score eight out of ten, signifying a "great" rating. He stated, "Afterbirth" was a very odd finale and I'm pretty sure that it was nothing like most of us thought it would be."

The Horror Writers Association gave "Afterbirth" the 2011 Bram Stoker Award for Superior Achievement in a Screenplay.
