= Carrington School =

Location
- Noke Drive; Redhill, Surrey, RH1 4AD; England
- Coordinates: 51.2420°N 0.1610°W

Information
- Type: Academy
- Motto: Ad Astra
- Trust: South East Surrey Schools Education Trust
- Department for Education URN: 143903 Tables
- Ofsted: Reports
- Head teacher: Kerry Oakley
- Staff: 56
- Gender: Coeducational
- Age: 11 to 16
- Enrolment: approx. 800
- Colour: Cyan (Light blue)
- Website: www.carringtonschool.org

Carrington School is a coeducational secondary school located in Redhill, Surrey, England.

Initially known as The Warwick School, it was founded in September 1984 through a merger of Albury Manor and Redstone Schools. Previously a community school administered by Surrey County Council, in January 2017 it converted to academy status. The school is now sponsored by the South East Surrey Schools Education Trust. In September 2021, the school changed its name to Carrington School.

== History ==
Albury Manor School opened in Merstham in September 1953 with 200 pupils, serving a new London County Council estate. Redstone School opened in September 1963 with 470 boys and A level courses were first offered starting in 1967. In September 1984, the two schools were merged to create Warwick School, based at the former Redstone School site in Noke Drive, Redhill. From the outset, the new school educated pupils aged 12 to 16. The school first admitted 11-year-olds in September 1993.

As part of a £15M transformation project, which included the construction of a new teaching block, the school was renamed to Carrington School in September 2021. The new name was chosen in honour of the astronomer, Richard Carrington, who built an observatory on Furze Hill in 1852.

== Headteacher ==
Kerry Oakley has been the Headteacher since 2018.

Prior to this, Ms Oakley was the Headteacher at St Andrew's High School in Croydon where she used the name Mrs Kerry Targett. During this time she was involved in several controversies including inappropriate use of the school credit card and one of her school trips making national headlines. St Andrew's was subsequently judged by OFSTED to be inadequate prior to its closure.

Ms Oakley invited parents to discuss this further with her upon starting at The Warwick School.

== Notable former pupils ==
- Henry Golding, actor, former presenter on BBC's The Travel Show
