= Return to You (film) =

Upcoming film by Mark Waters

- Directed by: Mark Waters
- Written by: Eric Champnella
- Produced by: Brad Krevoy; Lindsay Lohan
- Starring: Lindsay Lohan; Henry Golding
- Cinematography: Ed Wu
- Distributed by: Netflix
- Country: United States
- Language: English

Return to You is an upcoming American romantic comedy drama film directed by Mark Waters and written by Eric Champnella. It stars Lindsay Lohan and Henry Golding. Production began in September 2026 and wrapped in early November in Toronto. It is set to be released on Netflix in 2027.

== Premise ==
Set in 2008, an attorney mistakenly receives a DVD sent by a dying woman to her husband. Using only clues from the DVD, she sets out to find him.

== Cast ==
- Lindsay Lohan as Kim
- Henry Golding as Ben
- Ego Nwodim as Nancy
- Victor Garber as Frank Kessler
- Randall Park as Trey
- Sloane Pearson as Taylor
- Sharron Matthews
- Daniel DeSanto
- Stefanie Drummond

== Production ==
On September 28, 2026, Netflix announced that Lindsay Lohan and Henry Golding would be starring in Return to You. Principal photography started on that day in Toronto and was set to run through November 10. Mark Waters would direct from a script by Eric Champnella. Lohan and Brad Krevoy served as producers, with Olivia Krevoy, Jimmy Townsend and Galen Fletcher executive producing the film. The project marks a reunion between Lohan and Waters after they had previously worked together on Freaky Friday (2003) and Mean Girls (2004). For the first day of filming, the duo returned to shoot at the suburban house in Toronto that served as Cady Heron's family home in Mean Girls. Waters unveiled the rest of the main cast with an Instagram post, including Ego Nwodim, Victor Garber, Randall Park and Sloane Pearson in her film debut. Sharron Matthews, Daniel DeSanto and Stefanie Drummond, all of whom co-starred in Mean Girls alongside Lohan, also appear in the film.

== Release ==
Return to You is expected to premiere in 2027 on Netflix.
