= Steven Allerick =

Canadian-American actor

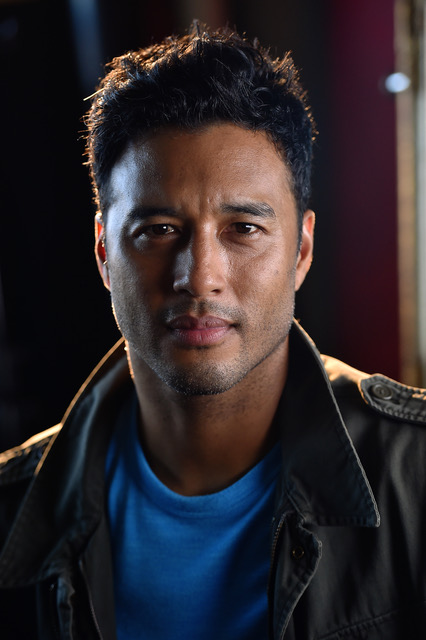
- Born: Toronto, Ontario, Canada
- Occupations: Actor; singer
- Years active: 1997–present
- Known for: movie acting, singing

Steven Allerick is a Canadian-American actor. He is best known for his roles as Snake Eyes's father in Snake Eyes: G.I. Joe Origins and as Simba in the Broadway production of Disney's The Lion King.

== Life and career ==
Allerick was born in Toronto, Ontario, to Jamaican parents. He graduated from Ryerson University. His work can be seen in numerous television shows including The Expanse and Fear the Walking Dead, and his voice can be heard on the title track to the hit anime Beyblade Burst as well as his self-titled album.

== Filmography ==
=== Film ===
Year	Title	Role	Notes
2021	Snake Eyes	Snake Eyes's father	
2020	I Don't	Steve	Short film
2019	Erasing His Past	Neil	TV movie
2018	Nanny Surveillance	Dan	TV movie
2018	Jamie, Michelle, and The Saddish Radish	Patron	Short film
2017	Smokd	Juror #7	Short film
2014	My Sister	Man	
2014	Level Up	Vineet	Short film
2008	This Is Not a Test	Man in SUV	
2007	Moxie	Itch	Short film
2007	Two-Eleven	Detective Mark Gray	Short film
1999	A Touch of Hope	Javier	TV movie
1998	Universal Soldier III: Unfinished Business	Air Traffic Controller	TV movie

=== Television ===
Year	Title	Role	Notes
2021	Sexpectations	Drew	5 episodes
2020	Station 19	Marco	1 episode
2020	Westworld	Delos Guard	1 episode
2019	The Fix	Officer Crawford	1 episode
2019	Carol's Second Act	Doug	1 episode
2019	S.W.A.T.	Guard	1 episode
2019	Supernatural	Cal	1 episode
2019	Nancy Drew	Sebastian	1 episode
2019	The Expanse	Benji Draper	3 episodes
2018	9-1-1	USAR Firefighter	1 episode
2018	The Rookie	Bo Sokolovsky	1 episode
2017	Rosewood	Rosewood (TV series)	1 episode
2017	Speechless	Alfonso	1 episode
2017	NCIS: Los Angeles	Tom Rhee	1 episode
2017	Colony	Grayhat Lieutenant	1 episode
2016	Jane the Virgin	Male Nurse	1 episode
2015	Switched at Birth	Employee	1 episode
2015	Extant	GSC Tech	3 episodes
2015	Fear the Walking Dead	Guardsman	1 episode
2014	Happyland	Chef Avinash	1 episode
2014	Scorpion	Terrorist Marine	1 episode
2004	Strong Medicine	Guy	1 episode
2003	Star Trek: Enterprise	Cook	1 episode
2000	Amazon	Ochinta	2 episodes
1999	Earth: Final Conflict	Safe House Volunteer	1 episode
1999	Relic Hunter	Jose	1 episode
1998	Highlander: The Raven	Tony	1 episode
1997	Fast Track	Sibling Rivalry	1 episode

=== Selected theatre ===
Production	Theater	Role(s)	Ref.
The Lion King	Princess of Wales Theatre and New Amsterdam Theatre	Simba	
Echoes in Concert	Factory Theatre	Various	
Romeo and Juliet	Ryerson Main Stage	Lord Montague	

=== Discography ===
- Our Time - Beyblade Burst Theme Song
