= Snake Eyes (2021 film) =

2021 film by Robert Schwentke

- Theatrical release poster
- Directed by: Robert Schwentke
- Screenplay by: Evan Spiliotopoulos; Joe Shrapnel; Anna Waterhouse
- Story by: Evan Spiliotopoulos
- Based on: G.I. Joe by Hasbro
- Produced by: Brian Goldner; Erik Howsam; Lorenzo di Bonaventura
- Starring: Henry Golding; Andrew Koji; Úrsula Corberó; Samara Weaving; Iko Uwais
- Cinematography: Bojan Bazelli
- Edited by: Stuart Levy
- Music by: Martin Todsharow
- Production companies: Paramount Pictures; Metro-Goldwyn-Mayer Pictures; Skydance Media; Entertainment One Films (Note: The Entertainment One logo is used, while the credits name their parent company (at the time), Hasbro.); di Bonaventura Pictures
- Distributed by: Paramount Pictures
- Release date: July 23, 2021
- Running time: 121 minutes
- Country: United States
- Languages: English; Japanese
- Budget: $88–110 million
- Box office: $40.1 million

Snake Eyes (also known as Snake Eyes: G.I. Joe Origins) is a 2021 American superhero film based on Hasbro's G.I. Joe toy line character Snake Eyes. The film serves as an origin story for the character, while also being a reboot and the third installment in the G.I. Joe film series. It is directed by Robert Schwentke from a screenplay by Evan Spiliotopoulos, Joe Shrapnel, and Anna Waterhouse. The film stars Henry Golding as Snake Eyes, a man who is invited to join a ninja clan while searching for his father's murderer to enact vengeance. Andrew Koji, Úrsula Corberó, Samara Weaving, and Iko Uwais also star in supporting roles.

The project was first announced in May 2018, with Golding being cast in the title role in August 2019, while the rest of the cast joined in subsequent months. After initial filming took place in Vancouver and Japan from October 2019 to February 2020, reshoots took place in March 2021.

Snake Eyes was released by Paramount Pictures in the United States on July 23, 2021. The film received generally mixed reviews from critics and only grossed $40 million worldwide against an $88–110 million budget, making it a box-office bomb.

== Plot ==
Living on the run, a young boy and his father are found by their sinister pursuers. Forced to roll dice to determine his fate, the father is murdered after rolling double ones, but his son escapes.

Twenty years later, the boy has adopted the name "Snake Eyes" and is discovered by Yakuza boss Kenta Takamura, competing in an underground fighting circuit. With the promise of help finding his father's killer, he agrees to join Kenta's criminal organization, and is asked to execute a man who infiltrated the gang, but helps him escape instead.

The man is Kenta's cousin Tommy, who reveals that they were both in line to lead the Arashikage clan, an ancient ninja society. Banished after trying to have Tommy killed, Kenta still seeks control of the clan. Grateful to Snake Eyes, Tommy brings him to his family's dōjō in Tokyo to be initiated. Tommy's grandmother Sen, the clan's current leader, agrees to let Snake Eyes undergo three trials to prove his worth.

In his first test, Snake Eyes is unable to seize a bowl of water from the clan's Hard Master; realizing this is a test of humility, he succeeds by respectfully asking instead. Unbeknownst to the clan, Snake Eyes has been tasked by Kenta with betraying Tommy; their escape was staged to allow Snake Eyes to win Tommy's trust, and to steal the clan's sacred "Jewel of the Sun".

The clan's head of security, Akiko, distrusts Snake Eyes, but she accompanies he and Tommy on a raid of Kenta's gang. They learn through an ally, Major Scarlett O'Hara, that Kenta is allied with the terrorist organization Cobra. Snake Eyes confronts Kenta and his Cobra liaison, the Baroness, who warns that stealing the jewel is the only way they will lead him to his father's killer.

The clan's Blind Master administers Snake Eyes' second test, a vision of his father, and he bonds with Akiko after telling her about his father's death. For his final trial, he faces the clan's gigantic, sacred anacondas. Sensing he is not truly pure of heart, the snakes attack, but he is saved by Akiko. Snake Eyes conceals his deception, but admits to having vengeance in his heart, & his lifelong search for his father’s murderer. He is allowed to live, but is expelled from the clan. He bids farewell to Tommy as blood brothers, but breaks into the clan's temple that night, subduing Akiko and stealing the jewel.

He delivers it to Kenta, who agrees to give it to Cobra once he has used it to take over the Arashikage. Snake Eyes receives his reward — his father's killer, a former Cobra agent — and forces him to roll his own dice, but spares his life and returns to warn the Arashikage. Tommy puts aside his anger when Snake Eyes comes to his aid, as Kenta uses the jewel's fiery magical powers to lay waste to the dōjō. Scarlett arrives to fight off Kenta's men, but she and Sen are captured.

A power-hungry Kenta refuses to hand over the jewel, prompting the Baroness to agree to a temporary alliance with Scarlett and the clan. With his men defeated, Kenta loses the jewel to Tommy, who tries to use its power to kill him. Kenta escapes, but Snake Eyes traps them both in the anaconda pit, where Kenta is devoured. The snakes now judge Snake Eyes as pure of heart, worthy of joining the clan.

Sen strips Tommy of his birthright for breaking the family's vow never to use the jewel. Forsaking the clan and blaming Snake Eyes, Tommy vows to kill him should they ever meet again. As Snake Eyes sets out to find him, Akiko gives him a black outfit and helmet, and Scarlett informs Snake Eyes that his father was a member of international peacekeeping organization, G.I. Joe, and invites him to become a fellow Joe. The Baroness invites Tommy to join Cobra, and he declares a new name for himself: "Storm Shadow".

== Cast ==
- Henry Golding as Snake Eyes:
  A lone fighter with a mysterious past, known only as "Snake Eyes", who is recruited into the secretive Clan Arashikage. The events of the film portray the character prior to becoming the heroic masked agent of the G.I. Joe organization. The character was drastically changed to accommodate a new background, motivation and ethnicity. Max Archibald plays the young Snake Eyes.
- Andrew Koji as Tommy / Storm Shadow:
  A skilled member and the heir of the Arashikage clan, and Snake Eyes' friend and brother-in-arms; who will eventually become his archenemy.
- Úrsula Corberó as Baroness:
  An elite operative at Cobra, a terrorist organization, who is second only to Cobra Commander.
- Samara Weaving as Scarlett: An elite agent and Army major in G.I. Joe and ally of the Arashikage clan.
- Haruka Abe as Akiko:
  The Arashikage clan's head of security, who forges a deep tie to Snake Eyes.
- Takehiro Hira as Kenta:
  Tommy's cousin, a member of Cobra; who seeks control of the Arashikage clan.
- Iko Uwais as Hard Master:
  A formidable mentor of the Arashikage clan and the uncle of Tommy.
- Peter Mensah as Blind Master:
  A blind mentor of the Arashikage clan.
- James Hiroyuki Liao as Yasuzo

In addition, Eri Ishida portrays Sen, leader of the Arashikage clan.

== Production ==
In May 2018, it was announced the next installment of the G.I. Joe franchise would be a spin-off film chronicling the origins of the character Snake Eyes. In December, producer Lorenzo di Bonaventura stated that Ray Park, who had played the character in the previous films, would not reprise his role for the spin-off. Robert Schwentke was set as director the same month. Antoine Fuqua, Chad Stahelski and Timo Tjahjanto had all met with producers before Schwentke was selected.

In August 2019, Henry Golding was cast to star in the title role. Andrew Koji was then cast as Storm Shadow, taking over the role from Lee Byung-hun, who played the character in the previous films. In September, Iko Uwais entered negotiations to join the film as Hard Master, and Úrsula Corberó was cast as Baroness. Uwais was confirmed in October, with Haruka Abe, Samara Weaving and Takehiro Hira added to the cast. Steven Allerick was announced as part of the cast in December. Golding's Instagram revealed that Peter Mensah would play Blind Master, taking over the role from RZA in the previous films.

Originally, Koji was not interested in a role in a G.I. Joe movie but ultimately could not pass the opportunity saying, "I thought about playing that character because I didn't like the first two films. I can say that. I'm allowed to not like a film. So, I was hesitant, at first, to even accept that. That's a big studio film and my first role in a big studio film, so I was very hesitant because I didn't have that trust in Hollywood to do that. What Warrior taught me and the voice that it gave me helped my work on Storm Shadow. I don't wanna play a character with a six-pack. I wanted him to be human and flawed. He's going through stuff. For me, when I saw the first G.I. Joe films, I was like, 'I don't wanna do that. That's not the kind of thing I wanna do.'"

With Golding replacing Ray Park from the previous G.I. Joe films, G.I. Joe: A Real American Hero writer Larry Hama stated "Some people are saying that casting Golding 'fixes' the character of Snake-Eyes, but I disagree. I had wanted to keep him ambiguous until Hasbro introduced Storm Shadow as the only Asian character and made him a bad guy. I decided to 'fix' that by delving into his background and gradually turning him into a good guy. This is why Snake-Eyes is a White guy."

Japanese action choreographer Kenji Tanigaki served as the action director and stunt coordinator for the film. He was brought onto the project on the recommendation of Chad Stahelski to the producers. Initially, Tanigaki was attached to the film solely as a choreographer, but Stahelski later recommended that he take on the additional role of second unit director.

Filming began on October 15, 2019, in Vancouver and was expected to continue until December 9. Filming moved to Japan on January 10, 2020, and wrapped on February 26, 2020. Filming locations in Japan included Kishiwada Castle and Engyō-ji. Golding announced in March 2021 that reshoots for the film had occurred.

== Release ==
Snake Eyes was released on July 23, 2021, in Dolby Cinema and IMAX. It was originally scheduled for release on March 27, 2020, before being delayed to October 16, and then a week later to October 23. The film was then removed from the release schedule on July 27, due to nationwide theater closures in the United States in the wake of the COVID-19 pandemic. Paramount later rescheduled the film for October 22, 2021, before it was moved up to July 23.

=== Home media ===
The film received a digital release on August 17, 2021, and was released on Ultra HD Blu-ray, Blu-ray and DVD on October 19 by Paramount Home Entertainment.

== Reception ==
=== Box office ===
Snake Eyes grossed $28.3 million in the United States and Canada, and $11.8 million in other territories, for a worldwide total of $40.1 million. With a production budget of at least $88 million, the film needed to gross $160–175 million in order to break-even.

In the United States and Canada, Snake Eyes was released alongside Old and Joe Bell, and was projected to gross around $15 million from 3,521 theaters in its opening weekend. The film made $5.5 million on its first day, including $1.4 million from Thursday night previews. It went on to debut to $13.4 million, finishing second at the box office, behind Old. The opening weekend, while in-line with projections, was deemed disappointing given the film's expensive production and promotional costs, and blamed on the ongoing pandemic, lukewarm critical reviews, and audiences being more selective of what films they were seeing in theaters than in a normal marketplace. The film fell 70% to $4 million in its sophomore weekend, finishing seventh, then made $1.6 million in its third weekend, dropping to eighth.

=== Critical response ===
On the review aggregator website Rotten Tomatoes, 35% of 147 critics' reviews are positive, with an average rating of 4.9/10. The website's consensus reads: "Far from silent and not particularly deadly, Snake Eyes serves as a step up for the G.I. Joe franchise, thanks in no small part to Henry Golding's work in the title role." Metacritic, which uses a weighted average, assigned the film a score of 43 out of 100, based on 32 critics, indicating "mixed or average" reviews. Audiences polled by CinemaScore gave the film an average grade of "B−" on an A+ to F scale.

Jesse Hassenger of The A.V. Club wrote, "Snake Eyes: G.I. Joe Origins doesn't reach the giddy, earnest heights of something like Aquaman or a Wachowski project. It methodically sets up sequels—to be recast and released around 2030, judging by the Joes's cinematic track record so far. But the dubiousness of its present-day achievement, the sheer ludicrousness of making the best G.I. Joe movie in 2021, is part of the dumbfounding fun." Variety's Owen Gleiberman said the film "looks almost nothing like a G.I. Joe movie," and wrote, "Snake Eyes, as directed by Robert Schwentke... has style and verve, with a diabolical family plot that creates a reasonable quota of actual drama. The movie is also a synthetic but infectiously skillful big-studio hodgepodge of ninja films, wuxia films, yakuza films, and international revenge films." Writing for /Film, Hoai-Tran Bui said that "[the] fight scenes are almost exclusively shot in close-up and shaky cam, and when they're not, they're edited so much that Snake Eyes might as well have shredded the frames with his sword." Bilge Ebiri of Vulture gave the film a negative review, criticizing the action sequences, story, and dialogue, but praised the film for its visuals and production values, writing "The action in Snake Eyes is instantly forgettable, even if the locations and costumes are sometimes fun. You can occasionally sense director Robert Schwentke ... trying to assert some visual imagination. There's one rain-soaked, neon-drenched street fight featuring long takes and swooping camera moves that gave me some early cause for hope, and Alec Hammond's production design, particularly at the Arashikage Clan's compound, occasionally enchants."

Glen Kenny of The New York Times gave the film a negative review, and criticized the story. He wrote "The plot points above are real; however, [it] bears only coincidental resemblance to an art film. But such are the longueurs of this would-be slam-bang blockbuster directed by Robert Schwentke, that it sure does inspire woolgathering ... For an ostensible action hero, Henry Golding in the title role does an awful lot of standing around and looking tense. The mayhem is frantic yet forgettable, and the possibly inadvertent goofiness extends from dialogue humdingers like 'For 600 years, our ninjas have brought peace and stability to Japan' to a central-casting villainess who looks like she has a side gig as a dominatrix." Johnny Oleksinki of New York Post rated the film 2 out of 4 stars, and wrote "All of this is building toward Snake Eyes becoming a Joe, but the martial arts film's connection to the main story feels frail, as if Crouching Tiger, Hidden Dragon ended with Michelle Yeoh becoming an Avenger. The fights, taken on their own, are occasionally OK, but not enough to lift this joke- and fun-free slog." Soren Andersen of The Seattle Times rated the film 1.5 out of 4 stars, and wrote " The fight scenes, full of swordplay and gunfire, are choppily edited and somehow lackadaisical. It's as though Schwentke was operating from a checklist of expected action-movie clichés and hurries through them all." He also went on to criticize Henry Golding's performance, writing "That guy [Snake Eyes] is supposed to be a super ninja. Lithe and limber. Tough and toned. An enigma. A loner. A total badass. Golding is none of those. Crazy Rich Asians revealed his forte as being a sexy smoothie. Easy on the eyes. Effortlessly engaging. Not the skill set for Mr. Snake Eyes" and said he lacked "presence".

== Future ==
In May 2020, a follow-up film was announced to be in development, with a script co-written by Shrapnel and Waterhouse. Di Bonaventura was set to return as producer, while the project would be a joint-venture production between Paramount Pictures, Metro-Goldwyn-Mayer, Hasbro Entertainment and di Bonaventura Pictures. In February 2026, two separate treatments for a new G.I. Joe film had been pitched to Paramount, one written by Max Landis and the other by Danny McBride. The next month, the studio passed on Landis' take but are still taking meeting with other filmmakers' take on the franchise. McBride revealed to Josh Horowitz in an interview on his Happy, Sad, Confused podcast that his G.I. Joe movie will follow Duke and the team battling Cobra in their town of Springfield and won't be a comedy. He also announced that he had written the script with Jeff Fradley and John Carcieri who their worked with on his HBO comedy series The Righteous Gemstones and will start filming in 2027 with McBride making his Directorial debut. Daniel Richtman reported that the studio are eyeing Bradley Cooper, Walton Goggins and Chris Pratt for roles after Chris Hemsworth has exited the movie for undisclosed reasons. Cooper was officially confirmed to play Duke in October 2026. In November 2026, it was announced that the film will be released in theaters on October 20, 2028.
