= Haruka Abe =

Japanese actress

- 安部 春香
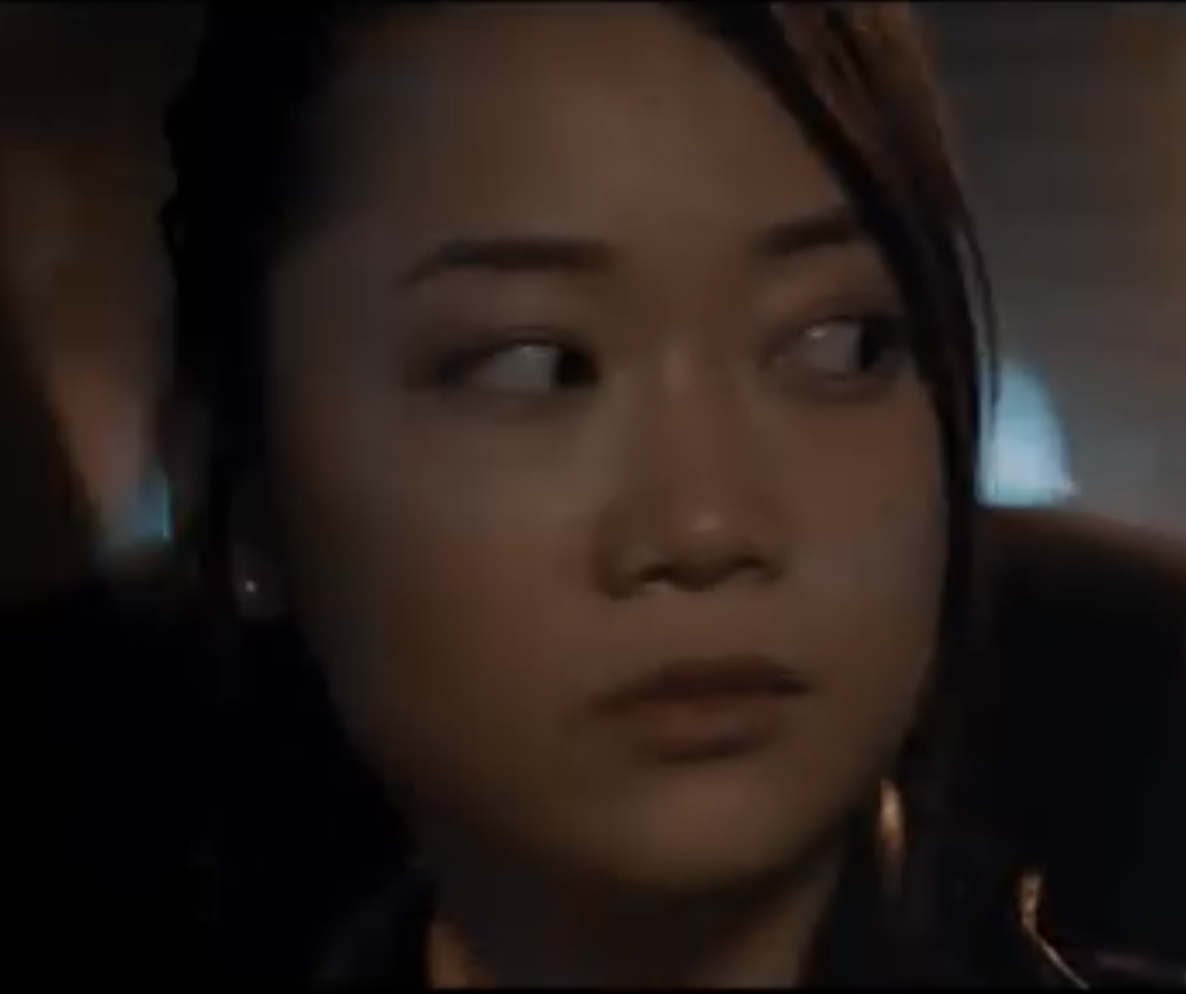
- Abe in 2016
- Born: 8 January 1988 (age 38); Nerima, Tokyo, Japan
- Education: Rose Bruford College
- Occupation: Actress
- Years active: 2006–present

Haruka Abe (安部 春香, Abe Haruka) (born 8 January 1988) is a Japanese actress based in London.

== Life and career ==
Born in Nerima, Tokyo, Abe grew up in Tokyo, London and New York. As a child, she trained at Gekidan Himawari, a children’s drama school in Tokyo. She trained at Rose Bruford College in South East London.

She appeared in BBC's Ideal as Miko, and as Marti in Sleepydog's science-fiction TV series Slingers directed by Steve Barron. She also appeared in the video for Clean Bandit's song "Rather Be" which has gained over 800 million views on YouTube as of 2025.

In 2018, she became the new speaking voice of Noodle from the virtual band Gorillaz.

== Filmography ==
=== Television ===
Year	Title	Role	Notes
2007–2011	Ideal	Miko	
2008	The Things I Haven't Told You	Sarah Kells	Television film
2009	Casualty	Mika	
2009	Slingers (Pilot)	Marti	
2009	Wire in the Blood	Japanese waitress	
2011	My So Called Life Sentence	Danini	Television film
2012	My Phone Genie	Naoko	
2014	Doctors	Jenny	
2014	Edge of Heaven	Tammy	
2015	Cuffs	Mikki	
2015	Cucumber	Anna	
2015	Cyberbully	Jennifer Li	
2017	Emerald City	Po	
2017	Zapped	Henchwoman	
2018	Kiss Me First	Tippi	
2018	Stath Lets Flats	Tomoko	
2019	Silent Witness	Akito Emon	Two episodes ("To Brighton, To Brighton")
2019	Giri/Haji	Suzume	
2020	Avenue 5	Aimi Ito	

=== Web series ===
Year	Title	Role	Notes
2020	Song Machine	Noodle	Web series by Gorillaz; 8 episodes

=== Film ===
Year	Title	Role	Notes
2006	Mo Yin	Sarah	
2007	Encore	Echo	
2009	Shell Shock	Lady One	
2009	Only Time	Li Jing	Short film
2009	Stray Balloon	Naomi	
2009	Slingers	Marti	Short film
2009	Aneurysm	Model	Short film
2009	We Have Already Begun to Die	She	
2010	Stanley Pickle	Bluebell	
2010	8 Seconds	Yumiko	
2010	Bleach	Li	Short film
2011	Yuki	Yuki	Short film
2011	Secrecy	Chie Okumura	
2011	Fish	Sakura	
2011	Great News		
2011	Magnesium	Eve30	
2012	Choose	4624	Short film
2012	The Outsider: A Looper's Story	Anna	Short film
2012	47 Ronin	Mika's handmaiden	
2013	About Time	Japanese girl	
2013	Pulling Away	Alyx Castillo	Short film
2014	Traces	The Searcher	Short film
2014	The Knife That Killed Me	Serena	
2014	The Scopia Effect	Keiko	
2015	After the World Ended	Sarama/ Sarameya	
2015	The Substitute	Seven	Short film
2015	Random 11	Mitsuko Unagi	
2015	Tokyo 70	Haruka	
2015	Kubrick's Coat	Ayame	Short film
2017	The Distant Sea	Girl in the house	Short film
2019	Hafu	Misaki	Short film
2019	Dead Unicorns	Haruka Satou	
2019	She's Just A Shadow	Tanya	
2021	Cruella	Liberty woman	
2021	Stagger	Eva	Short film
2021	Snake Eyes	Akiko	Also does own dub-over voice in Japanese version

=== Music videos ===
Year	Song	Singer/Band	Notes
2010	"Chaos Lives In Everything"	Dead & Control	Mimed to Office
2014	"Rather Be"	Clean Bandit	Mimed to Jess Glynne's vocals

=== Video games ===
Year	Title	Voice role	Notes
2016	Late Shift	May-Ling	Full motion video

== See also ==
- Japanese community in London
