= Andrew Koji =

British actor and martial artist (born 1987)

- Born: 10 November 1987 (age 38)
- Citizenship: United Kingdom
- Occupations: Actor; martial artist
- Years active: 2006–present

Andrew Koji (born 10 November 1987) is a British actor and martial artist. He had his breakthrough role as Ah Sahm in the Cinemax series Warrior (2019–2023). Koji went on to play Storm Shadow in Snake Eyes (2021), Yuichi "The Father" Kimura in Bullet Train (2022), and Zeek Kimura in Gangs of London (2025–present).

== Early life ==
Koji was born on 10 November 1987 to an English mother and a Japanese father. His parents separated when he was young, and he was brought up by his mother in Epsom, Surrey.

== Career ==
Koji began working in the film industry doing extra work and making short films as a teenager. At 18, he moved to Thailand while still training in martial arts and did some small jobs in the film industry. He subsequently worked in Japan's film industry for a few years, before returning to England to train at the Actors' Temple Studio in London. Eventually, Koji started getting more jobs in theatre and television in the UK. Regarding his opportunities there, he stated: "In the UK I would say my dual heritage has not particularly been advantageous. Opportunities for East Asian actors at the time was and still is quite limited—although things are changing."

Koji dropped out of university at the age of 19 to focus on acting and martial arts. In his twenties, Koji studied and competed in taekwondo and trained in Shaolin kung fu at the Shaolin Temple UK. He has written and produced his films, and has also worked as a stunt double; most notably on Fast & Furious 6. He has also performed with the Royal Shakespeare Company, at the Regent's Park Open Air Theatre, Hampstead Theatre, Royal Court, Charing Cross Theatre, and Ovalhouse among others.

By 2017, Koji was discouraged by a lack of television roles and considered a career change. His agent and his mother convinced him to submit an audition tape for the lead role of Ah Sahm in the Cinemax series Warrior, which he secured. Based on an original idea by Bruce Lee for the 1972 series Kung Fu, that starred David Carradine, Warrior is centered around a martial arts prodigy in the late 1870s who emigrates from China to the United States in search of his sister, only to be drawn into the Tong Wars of San Francisco. In a nod to Lee's idea for the character's ethnic background, Ah Sahm is of partial European ancestry, which Koji found fitting for the character and relatable due to his own ancestry. The series ran for three seasons, from 2019 to 2023.

Koji played Storm Shadow in the 2021 film Snake Eyes, and assassin Yuichi Kimura in David Leitch's 2022 action film Bullet Train. In 2023 he appeared in the action-fantasy film Boy Kills World, directed by Moritz Mohr, and had a recurring role in the first season of the Netflix series Black Doves.

In May 2025, Koji was confirmed for the role of Ryu in the Street Fighter reboot film.

== Filmography ==
=== Film ===
Key
†	Denotes films that have not yet been released

Year	Title	Role	Notes
2007	FB: Fighting Beat	Kali	
2009	20th Century Boys 2: The Last Hope	Thai Gangster	
2011	The Missing Day	Huan	
2013	Fast & Furious 6	Undercover Police	Extra role (uncredited); also stunt double for Sung Kang
2013	Scrutiny	Stefan Aire	
2013	Above the Waist	Ken	Short film; also writer and producer Won Best Actor Award - Short Film, Asian on Film Festival
2013	A Situation	Yuji	
2013	#aiww: The Arrest of Ai Weiwei	1st Policeman / 1st Soldier	
2015	Luck	Rai	
2015	Deep Pan Fury	Katashi Kimoto	
2017	Trendy	Estate Agent 1	
2021	Snake Eyes	Tomisaburo Arashikage / Storm Shadow	
2022	Bullet Train	Yuichi Kimura	
2023	Seneca – On the Creation of Earthquakes	Felix	
2024	Boy Kills World	Basho	
2025	Worth the Wait	Scott	
2026	Double Trouble	David	
2026	Street Fighter	Ryu	

=== Television ===
Year	Title	Role	Notes
2010, 2015	Casualty	Keong Murong / Haro Reid	2 episodes
2012	Narrow Escapes	WW2 Soldier	
2012	Seconds from Disaster	ATC Officer-JAL 123	Episode: "Terrified Over Tokyo"
2013	The Wrong Mans	Jason	3 episodes
2014	Film Lab Presents	Sam	Episode: "Deciding to Live"
2015	Acquitted	Chen Liang	2 episodes
2016	Call the Midwife	Benny Su	Episode #5.3
2017	Jade Dragon	Mikey	2 episodes
2017	Finding Akira	James	TV film
2018	The Innocents	Andrew	3 episodes
2019	American Gods	CEO	Episode: "The Greatest Story Ever Told"
2019	Peaky Blinders	Brilliant Chang	2 episodes
2019–2023	Warrior	Ah Sahm	Main role; 30 episodes
2024	Black Doves	Jason Davies	6 episodes
2025–present	Gangs of London	Zeek Kimura	6 episodes
2026	Steal	Darren Yoshida	5 episodes

=== Video games ===
Year	Title	Role
2017	Final Fantasy XIV	Hien Rijin
2024	Black Myth: Wukong	Erlang Shen

=== Theatre ===
Year	Title	Role	Production company
	Star Wars Stage Show	Jedi	Weird and Wonderful
	Richard III	Richard	The Actors Temple
	A Streetcar Named Desire	Stanley Kowalski	The Actors Temple
2013	The Fu Manchu Complex	Dr. Petrie	Moongate Productions/ Mark Cartwright Productions
2013	The Arrest of Ai Weiwei	Policeman / Soldier	Hampstead Theatre
	The Forgotten of the Forgotten	Guo	Radar Festival
	Hidden	Jason/ Various other roles	Royal Court Theatre
2016	In the Bar of a Tokyo Hotel	The Barman	Charing Cross Theatre
2016	Shangri-La	Karma	Yellow Earth
2017	Snow in Midsummer	Fang	RSC
2017	A Tale of Two Cities	Jacques	Regents Park Open Air Theatre
