= Henry Golding =

British actor (born 1987)

- Golding in 2026
- Born: Henry Ewan Golding; 5 February 1987 (age 39); Betong, Sarawak, Malaysia
- Citizenship: United Kingdom
- Occupations: Actor; TV presenter
- Years active: 2007–present
- Spouse: Liv Lo (m. 2016)
- Children: 2

Signature
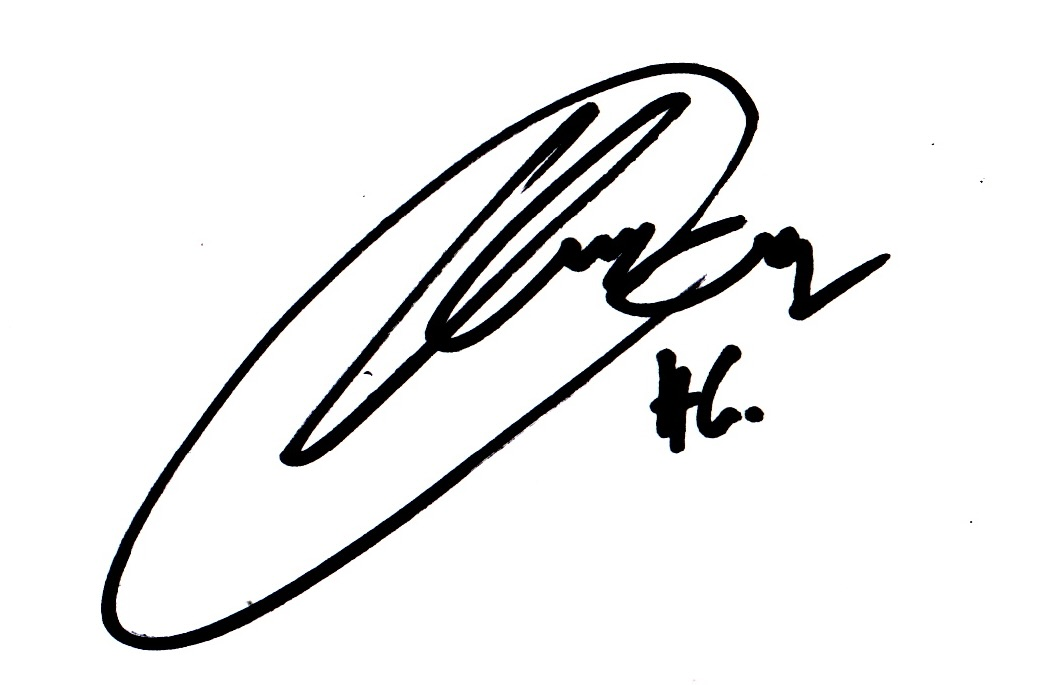

Henry Ewan Golding (born 5 February 1987) is a British actor and former television presenter. He has starred in the romantic comedies Crazy Rich Asians (2018) and Last Christmas (2019), the thriller A Simple Favor (2018), the action comedy The Gentlemen (2019), as well as playing the title character in the action-adventure Snake Eyes (2021), and he appeared in the ensemble cast of The Ministry of Ungentlemanly Warfare (2024). In 2025, he had a role in the second season of the Hulu anthology series Nine Perfect Strangers. Born in Malaysia to an English father and a Malaysian mother, Golding moved to England at the age of eight. Before being known for his film work, he began his career as a presenter on ESPN, BBC and Discovery Channel Asia.

== Early life ==
Henry Ewan Golding was born on 5 February 1987 in the town of Betong, Sarawak, Malaysia. His mother, Margaret Likan, is a Malaysian of Iban ancestry, and his father, Clive Golding, is English. Golding holds a British passport. The youngest of three children, he has a sister and a brother. Margaret and Clive had met in Brunei, where the former was working as an au pair for an expatriate family, while the latter was in the British Army's Royal Electrical and Mechanical Engineers. The couple married three or four months later and moved to the United Kingdom, where they lived in army quarters. They later moved to Sarawak because, during the Falklands War in 1982, Clive was stationed on The Falklands, and Margaret felt lonely, especially when Golding's brother was born.

For almost five years, the family lived in the district of Dungun, Terengganu, where Clive worked as a helicopter engineer. They moved to the countryside of Surrey, England, when Golding was eight years old, and he went to The Warwick School. At school, Golding was bullied on the playground for coming from Asia. After working as a hairdresser for several years on Sloane Street in London, he moved back to Malaysia at the age of 21, pursuing on-camera roles in Kuala Lumpur.

== Career ==
Golding began working as a television presenter in 2008, presenting a weekly football show for ESPN, The Travel Show for the BBC and Surviving Borneo for Discovery Channel Asia.

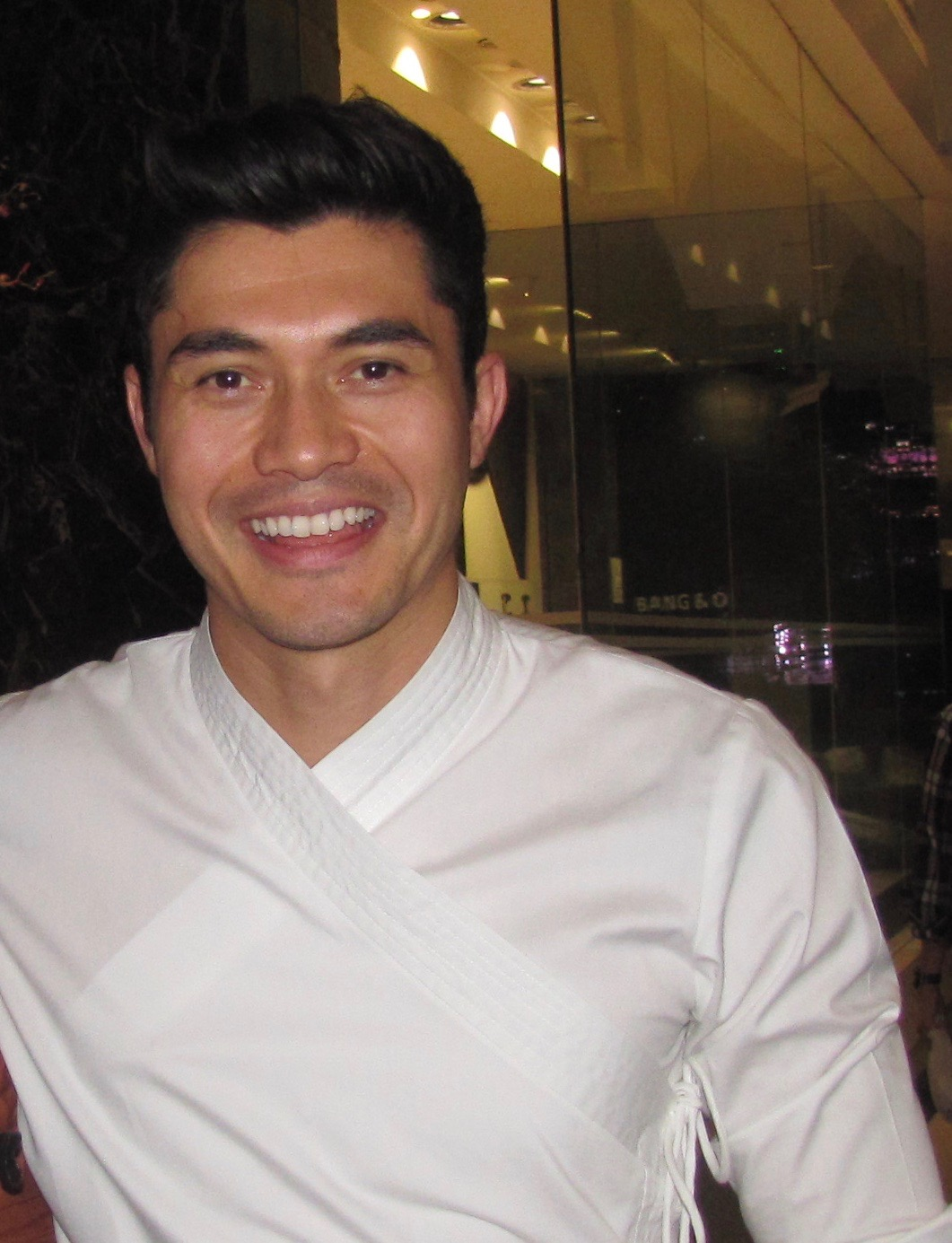
Golding at the wrap of filming for Crazy Rich Asians.

In March 2017, after a global casting call, it was announced that Golding would star in the film Crazy Rich Asians alongside Constance Wu. He was first brought to director Jon M. Chu's attention by accountant Lisa-Kim Ling Kuan, and Golding's charm and personality quickly won him his first major acting role. Crazy Rich Asians was released in the United States and Canada on 15 August 2018 by Warner Bros. Pictures and was met with high critical praise, becoming the number one movie in U.S. and Canadian theatres over its opening weekend. A month later, Golding appeared in Paul Feig's thriller A Simple Favor, co-starring Blake Lively and Anna Kendrick, playing Sean, the husband of Lively's character. Following the success of Crazy Rich Asians, and, to a lesser extent, A Simple Favor, Golding was cast opposite Emilia Clarke in the romantic comedy Last Christmas, directed by Feig (in their second collaboration). Filming commenced on 26 November 2018 and continued until February 2019, and the film was released on 8 November 2019.

Golding starred alongside Matthew McConaughey, Hugh Grant, and Michelle Dockery in The Gentlemen, a 2019 crime film directed by Guy Ritchie. Golding went on to star in Monsoon, directed by Hong Khaou, as Kit, a man who travels from London to his birth country of Vietnam to scatter his parents' ashes.

In August 2019, Golding was cast in the title role of Snake Eyes, a spin-off from the G.I. Joe movie franchise, which was released in July 2021. Filming for Snake Eyes began in October 2019 in Vancouver, and wrapped in February 2020 in Japan.

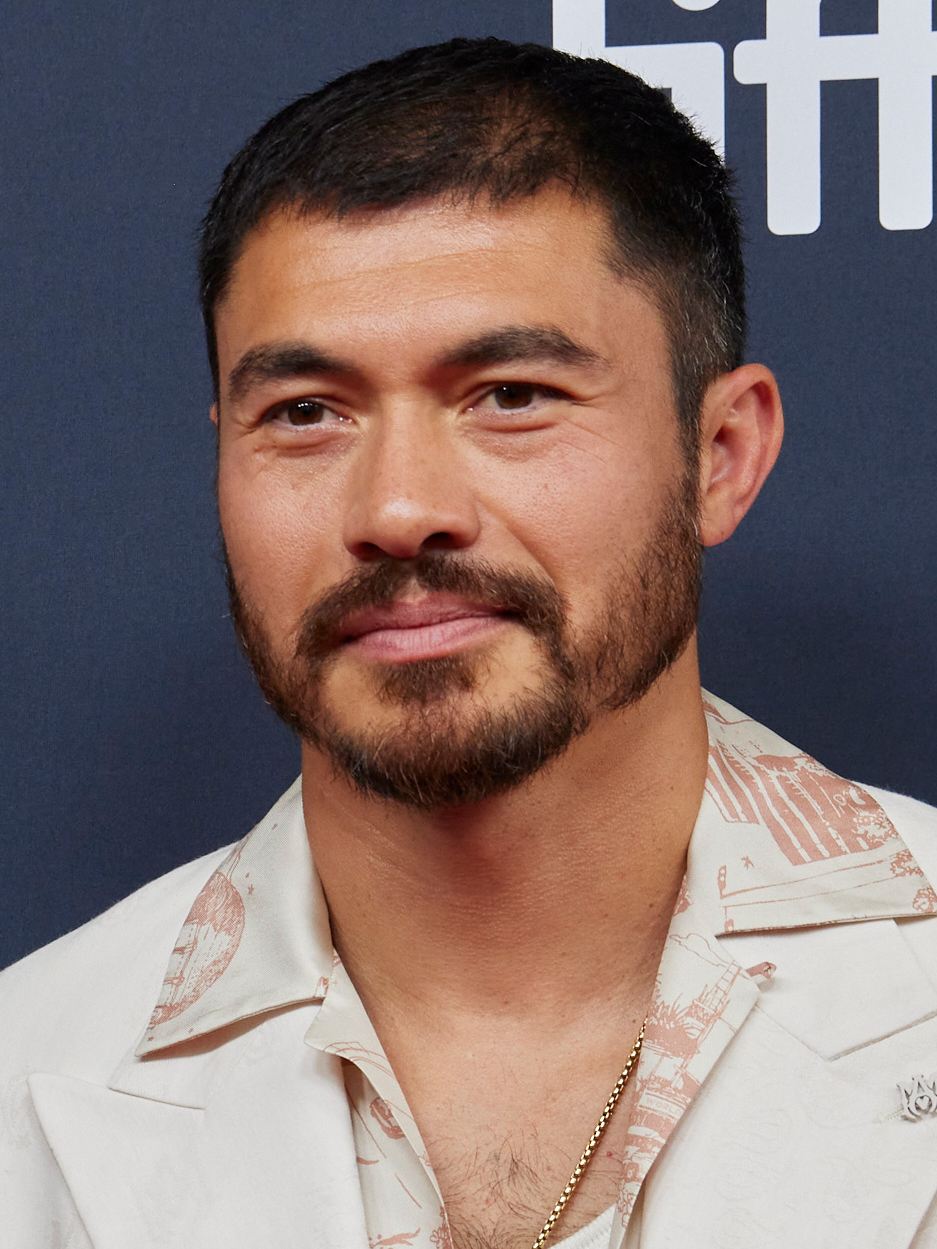
Golding at the 2024 Toronto International Film Festival.

He starred in The Ministry of Ungentlemanly Warfare in 2024.

In 2025, he reprised his role as Sean Townsend in Another Simple Favor. He also appears as Hang Tuah, a sage-immortal, in The Old Guard 2.

Golding is the narrator for Thomas & Friends: Railway Stories, a reboot of the Thomas & Friends franchise. Golding has expressed that he "feels so lucky" to have the role, as he grew up familiar with Thomas & Friends and identified with the character Henry the Green Engine.

== Personal life ==
Golding met Liv Lo, a Taiwanese television presenter and yoga instructor, on New Year's Day 2011. They became engaged in 2015 and married in August 2016 in Sarawak. They live in Venice Beach, California, with their two daughters, born in 2021 and 2023.

Before his marriage, Golding completed his bejalai—the Iban rite of passage into manhood—in the wilderness of Borneo, filming the experience over two months (and carrying the camera equipment himself) for the documentary series Surviving Borneo on Discovery Channel Asia. His journey ended in him receiving a traditional hand-tapped bejalai tattoo by Ernesto Kalum of Borneoheadhunters Tattoo in Kuching, Sarawak. The tattoo on his right thigh is a fig tree that wraps around other trees and takes their form to become the tree itself.

When interviewed by Michele Manelis of The New Zealand Herald, Golding said of his surname, "Golding is really darn Jewish, isn't it? My grandfather during the war was in London and as the story goes, he was possibly adopted by a Jewish family by that name."

== Filmography ==
=== Film ===
Key
†	Denotes films that have not yet been released

Year	Title	Role	Notes
2009	Pisau Cukur	Iskandar Tan Sri Murad	Special appearance
2013	The Borneo Incident	Henry	
2018	Crazy Rich Asians	Nick Young	
2018	A Simple Favor	Sean Townsend	
2019	Monsoon	Kit	
2019	Last Christmas	Tom Webster	
2019	The Gentlemen	Dry Eye	
2021	Snake Eyes	Snake Eyes	
2022	Persuasion	Mr. Elliot	
2023	Assassin Club	Morgan Gaines	Also executive producer
2023	Downtown Owl	Vance Druid	
2024	The Tiger's Apprentice	Mr. Hu	Voice role
2024	The Ministry of Ungentlemanly Warfare	Freddy Alvarez	
2024	Daniela Forever	Nicolas	
2025	Another Simple Favor	Sean Townsend	
2025	The Old Guard 2	Tuah	
2026	The Lost Ones	Father	
2027	Return to You †	Ben	
TBA	Close Personal Friends †	TBA	Post-production

=== Television ===
Key
†	Denotes television productions that have not yet been released

Year	Title	Role	Notes
2007–2010	The 8TV Quickie	Himself	Presenter
2009	Goda	Hariz	
2010–2012	Football Crazy	Himself	Presenter
2011	Without Boundaries: Islands and Beaches	Himself	Presenter
2011	Without Boundaries: The Great Outdoor	Himself	Presenter
2012	Welcome to the Railworld Malaysia	Himself	Presenter
2013	Driving Change with Caltex	Himself	TV Special
2014–present	The Travel Show	Himself	Co-presenter
2015	Welcome to the Railworld Japan	Himself	Presenter
2017	Surviving Borneo	Himself	Presenter
2021	Star Wars: Visions	Tsubaki (voice)	Short film: Akakiri; English language dub
2025	No Taste Like Home with Antoni Porowski	Himself	Guest
2025	Nine Perfect Strangers	Peter	Main cast (season 2)
2027	Thomas & Friends: Railway Stories †	Narrator	Post-production; voice role

== Awards and nominations ==
Year	Award	Category	Nominated work	Result	Ref.
2010	2nd Shout! Awards	Favorite TV Personality Award	The 8TV Quickie	Nominated	
2010	2nd Shout! Awards	Hot Guy Award	Himself	Won	
2012	3rd Shout! Awards	Favorite TV Personality Award	Welcome to the Railworld Malaysia	Nominated	
2012	3rd Shout! Awards	Hot Guy Award	Himself	Nominated	
2013	4th Shout! Awards	Hot Guy Award	Himself	Nominated	
2018	Women Film Critics Circle Awards	Best Screen Couple	Crazy Rich Asians	Nominated	
2019	9th The Asian Awards	Outstanding Achievement in Cinema	Crazy Rich Asians	Won	
2019	Teen Choice Awards	Choice Comedy Movie Actor	Crazy Rich Asians	Nominated	
2019	Screen Actors Guild Awards	Outstanding Ensemble Cast – Motion Picture	Crazy Rich Asians	Nominated	
