= A Simple Favor (film) =

2018 film by Paul Feig

- Theatrical release poster
- Directed by: Paul Feig
- Screenplay by: Jessica Sharzer
- Based on: A Simple Favor by Darcey Bell
- Produced by: Paul Feig; Jessie Henderson
- Starring: Anna Kendrick; Blake Lively; Henry Golding; Andrew Rannells
- Cinematography: John Schwartzman
- Edited by: Brent White
- Music by: Theodore Shapiro
- Production companies: Feigco Entertainment; Bron Studios
- Distributed by: Lionsgate
- Release date: September 14, 2018
- Running time: 117 minutes
- Country: United States
- Language: English
- Budget: $20 million
- Box office: $97.6 million

A Simple Favor is a 2018 American black comedy mystery film directed by Paul Feig from a screenplay by Jessica Sharzer, based on the 2017 novel by Darcey Bell. It stars Anna Kendrick, Blake Lively, Henry Golding, and Andrew Rannells, and follows a small-town vlogger (Kendrick) who tries to solve the disappearance of her elegant and mysterious friend (Lively).

The film's development began in 2016 when 20th Century Fox bought the rights to the novel. The following year, it was moved to Lionsgate with Feig hired to direct while Kendrick and Lively were cast in the leading roles. Filming took place in Toronto, Ontario and began in February 2017.

A Simple Favor was released theatrically by Lionsgate in the United States on September 14, 2018. The film received generally positive reviews from critics for its plot twists and performances (especially that of Kendrick, Lively, and Golding). It grossed $97.6 million worldwide on a $20 million budget. A sequel, Another Simple Favor, was released on Amazon Prime Video on May 1, 2025, with Kendrick and Lively reprising their roles, and Feig returning as director.

== Plot ==
In Warfield, Connecticut, widowed single mother Stephanie Smothers runs a vlog featuring crafts and recipes for mothers. She becomes friends with Emily Nelson, the mother of her son Miles' best friend and classmate Nicky and a PR director for a fashion company, and they start to meet in the afternoon over martinis.

Emily shares that she is frustrated by the lack of success of her husband, English professor Sean Townsend, and their poor financial situation. Later, Stephanie reveals that after her father died when she was a teenager, she discovered she had a half-brother, Chris, whom she once kissed, though Emily correctly guesses that they had sex.

Stephanie babysits Emily's son while Sean is in London. After two days of Emily not returning calls, she learns from her boss that she is in Miami. Stephanie calls Sean, who contacts the police. Trying to resolve Emily's disappearance, she makes missing person flyers using a photo of Emily that she found hidden on her desk.

Detective Summerville reports that Emily lied about Miami, and that her drowned body was discovered in the lake at a summer camp in Michigan. Stephanie and Sean share their grief and begin a sexual relationship. Summerville reveals to her that Emily had severe liver damage and a large amount of heroin in her system, and that Sean had recently taken out a $4 million life insurance policy on her.

Stephanie receives an insulting message apparently from Emily about her tryst with her half-brother Chris. She has a flashback of her late husband suspecting her infidelity and that Chris was the real father of their son Miles. This likely led him to cause the car crash that killed both of the men.

Investigating Emily's past, Stephanie visits painter Diana Hyland in Manhattan, who seems to have been a lover of hers and had painted her portrait. She says the painting is actually of her muse Claudia, whom she describes as a con artist who disappeared.

Information from Diana leads Stephanie to a summer camp and its yearbook that shows Emily to be a girl named Hope McLanden, who had triplet sisters Charity (who died in the womb) and Faith. Stephanie visits the twins' mother Margaret, who explains that at 16, Faith and Hope had set fire to the family house, killing their abusive father, and disappeared.

While Stephanie is away on her investigative trips, Emily surprises Sean by reappearing. She has returned for the insurance money and is leaving the country. Stephanie later contrives to meet with Emily, who confirms the story.

The sisters fled separately with a plan to reunite later. Faith did not turn up as agreed, but reappeared 14 years later. An alcoholic and heroin addict, she threatened to turn them both in to the authorities by confessing the patricide unless Emily paid her $1 million. Pretending to agree to the demand, Emily staged her own death by drowning Faith in the lake.

Emily and Stephanie are both angered by Sean's relationship with the other, so Emily convinces Stephanie to frame Sean for Faith's death. He is arrested and released on bail. Stephanie has a change of heart and stages an argument with Sean in front of Emily in order to incriminate her while police-planted microphones are recording the meeting. Stephanie fakes shooting Sean.

Emily, having predicted their ruse and disabled the microphones, confesses her crimes while holding the pair at gunpoint, saying that she will stage their murder–suicide. She shoots Sean in the shoulder and turns the gun on Stephanie, who reveals a hidden camera on her sweater button which is live-streaming the event on her vlog. Emily attempts to escape, then turns around outside the house and points her gun at Stephanie. Darren, a parent of one of the school students, hits Emily with his car, then the police arrive and arrest her.

In the epilogue, it is revealed that Emily has been sentenced to 20 years in prison for the murders of her father and sister. Sean has become a successful professor at Berkeley, where he currently lives with his son. Stephanie's vlog has garnered one million followers; her knack for solving crimes has made her a part-time private detective who has successfully helped solve thirty cold cases.

== Cast ==
- Anna Kendrick as Stephanie Smothers
- Blake Lively as
  - Emily Nelson / Hope McLanden
    - Nicole Peters as Hope (16 Years Old)
  - Faith McLanden, Emily's identical twin sister
    - Lauren Peters as Faith (16 Years Old)
- Henry Golding as Sean Townsend, Emily's husband
- Andrew Rannells as Darren
- Linda Cardellini as Diana Hyland
- Jean Smart as Margaret McLanden, Emily's mother
- Rupert Friend as Dennis Nylon
- Eric Johnson as Davis Smothers, Stephanie's deceased husband
- Dustin Milligan as Chris, Stephanie's deceased paternal half-brother
- Bashir Salahuddin as Detective Summerville
- Joshua Satine as Miles Smothers, Stephanie's son
- Ian Ho as Nicholas "Nicky" Townsend-Nelson, Emily and Sean's son
- Kelly McCormack as Stacy
- Aparna Nancherla as Sona
- Patti Harrison as Kiko
- Melissa O'Neil as Beth T.A.
- Sarah Baker as Maryanne Chelkowsky
- Corinne Conley as a librarian

== Production ==
=== Development ===
In January 2016, it was announced that 20th Century Fox had bought the film rights to author Darcey Bell's novel A Simple Favor prior to the book's publication. The story was pitched as being similar to Gone Girl and The Girl on the Train. Creative Artists Agency represented the movie rights in the deal with Fox.

=== Pre-production ===
In June 2017, it was announced that A Simple Favor would be extricated from 20th Century Fox and instead be distributed by Lionsgate. It was also announced that it would be directed by Paul Feig, with Anna Kendrick and Blake Lively "in talks" for the lead roles. On July 26, 2017, Kendrick and Lively were confirmed, while Henry Golding joined the cast as the husband of Lively's character. Linda Cardellini was announced as having been cast in an undisclosed role in September 2017, and Andrew Rannells, Jean Smart, and Rupert Friend were later added.

=== Filming ===
A Simple Favor commenced principal photography on August 14, 2017, in Toronto, Ontario, Canada. It was shot in the Univisium 2.00:1 aspect ratio on Panavision Millennium DXL 8K cameras.

== Release ==
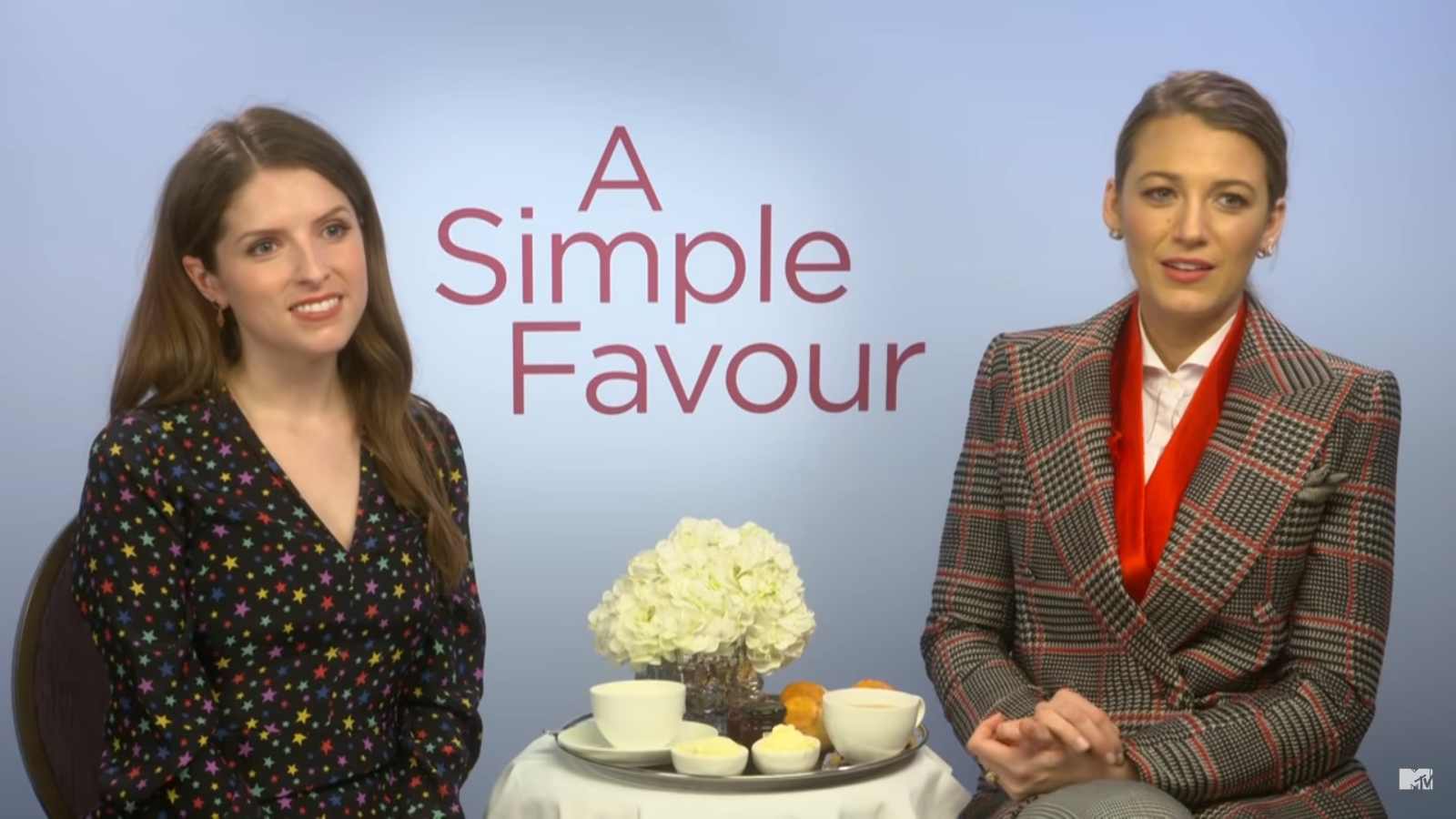
Kendrick and Lively promoting A Simple Favor

The film was released on September 14, 2018.

=== Marketing ===
On May 1, 2018, Blake Lively hid all pictures from her Instagram account to promote the film. The first teaser trailer was released on May 2, 2018, followed by the second teaser trailer, which was released on May 24.

== Reception ==
=== Box office ===
A Simple Favor grossed $53.5 million in the United States and Canada, and $44.1 million in other territories, for a total worldwide gross of $97.6 million, against a production budget of $20 million.

In the United States and Canada, it was released alongside White Boy Rick, Unbroken: Path to Redemption and The Predator, and was projected to gross $12–15 million from 3,102 theaters in its opening weekend. It made $5.9 million on its first day (including $900,000 from Thursday night previews) and $16.0 million over the weekend, finishing third, behind The Predator and The Nun. It dropped just 36% in its second weekend, to $10.4 million, finishing second, behind newcomer The House with a Clock in Its Walls.

=== Critical response ===
On the review aggregator website Rotten Tomatoes, A Simple Favor holds an approval rating of 84% based on 259 reviews, with an average rating of 6.9/10. The website's critics consensus reads, "Twisty, twisted, and above all simply fun, A Simple Favor casts a stylish mommy noir spell strengthened by potent performances from Anna Kendrick and Blake Lively." Metacritic, which uses a weighted average, assigned the film a score of 67 out of 100, based on 41 critics, indicating "generally favorable" reviews. Audiences polled by CinemaScore gave the film an average grade of "B+" on an A+ to F scale, while PostTrak reported filmgoers gave it a 76% positive score.

Amy Nicholson of Variety wrote: "The film feels a lot like the Serge Gainsbourg number that Stephanie dances to in the kitchen: jazzy, a little sleazy, and worth a cult following." Wendy Ide of The Guardian gave the film a four stars out of five and wrote: "The lip-smacking, acid drops of malice in the latest film from Paul Feig (Bridesmaids) makes this unexpectedly cruel comedy as intoxicating as the mid-afternoon martinis swilled by the two central characters."

=== Accolades ===
Award	Date of ceremony	Category	Recipient(s)	Result	Ref.
Dorian Awards	January 8, 2019	Campy Flick of the Year	A Simple Favor	Won	
Golden Trailer Awards	May 28, 2019	Best Motion/Title Graphic	A Simple Favor	Nominated	
Young Artist Award	July 14, 2019	Best Performance in a Feature Film: Supporting Young Actor	Ian Ho	Nominated	

== Sequel ==
In May 2022, a sequel was announced, with Feig returning to direct the film, and Kendrick and Lively reprising their roles. Lionsgate co-produced the film with Amazon MGM Studios. In March 2024, Amazon officially greenlit the sequel, with Golding, Rannells, Salahuddin, Satine, Ho and McCormack also reprising their roles. The sequel, Another Simple Favor, premiered at the South by Southwest Festival on March 7, 2025, and was released on Amazon Prime Video on May 1.
