= A Simple Favor (novel) =

2017 novel by Darcey Bell

- Hardcover edition
- Author: Darcey Bell
- Language: English
- Genre: Thriller; Murder mystery
- Publisher: Harper
- Publication date: March 21, 2017
- Publication place: United States
- Media type: Print (hardback and paperback), e-book, audiobook
- Pages: 304
- ISBN: 978-0-06-249777-2

A Simple Favor is the debut thriller novel by Darcey Bell. It was first published on March 21, 2017, by Harper. The novel centers on Stephanie, a mom blogger who seeks to uncover the truth behind her best friend Emily's sudden disappearance from their small town in Connecticut. Employing the unreliable narrator technique, the story is told through Stephanie, Emily, and Emily's husband, Sean.

== Summary ==
Mommy blogger Stephanie Ward is asked a favor by her best friend, Emily Nelson, one day to help pick up Emily's son after school. Emily never shows up to collect her son from Stephanie however, and after days of searching, she is believed to have been found dead. Stephanie starts digging deeper into Emily's secrets as she seeks to uncover the truth.

== Reception ==
Writing for the Richmond Times-Dispatch, Jay Strafford described the novel as "Gone Girl gone nuclear, Gone Girl on steroids, amphetamines and cocaine." Strafford added that, "But let it be said that Bell possesses a wicked imagination and a firm grasp on plotting; she fills A Simple Favor with multiple twists, all the while providing subtle clues for the astute reader." The Cleveland Plain-Dealer's Laura DeMarco gave the novel a "B" grade and called it a "pageturner". Toronto Star's Jack Batten noted that it was a "stylish and unsettling thriller," and said, "The plot stretches into increasingly dark territory, the narrative mixing familiar gimmicks in the thriller repertoire and producing an overall story that's just mysterious and weird enough to supply maximum satisfaction."

On the other hand, Publishers Weekly felt that Bell "squanders an intriguing setup with ill-defined stakes and tired, telegraphed plot twists," describing the novel as "convoluted". The Belfast Telegraph's Georgina Rodgers agreed, saying, "Stephanie and her blog were very two-dimensional and not believable and parts of the plot felt forced and too far-fetched."

== Film Adaptation ==
20th Century Fox pre-emptively acquired the film rights for the novel in January 2016. In June 2017, Paul Feig signed on to direct the film adaptation, which stars Anna Kendrick, Blake Lively, and Henry Golding. It was released in the United States on September 14, 2018.
