= Nerve (Ryan novel) =

2012 young adult techno-thriller by Jeanne Ryan

- First edition
- Author: Jeanne Ryan
- Language: English
- Genre: Young Adult Fiction; Techno-thriller; Adventure novel
- Published: 2012 (Dial Press)
- Publication place: United States
- Media type: Print (hardback)
- Pages: 304
- ISBN: 9780803738324
- OCLC: 774212522

Nerve is a 2012 young adult techno-thriller by Jeanne Ryan.

== Plot ==
Shy junior Vee, with the help of her friend Tommy, tries out for the online game of dares, NERVE, to impress her crush. After uploading her audition reel, they realize her cotton shirt becomes see-through after she poured cold water on herself. They fail to delete their upload.

Vee then receives a dare with expensive designer shoes on her wishlist as the prize. Tommy warns the dare may come from hackers who illegally collect contestants' personal information. Vee proceeds anyway, and the game pairs her up with fellow contestant Ian.

Vee and Ian complete a series of riskier and more lucrative dares and make their way to the final round, where they compete against five other finalists. Vee flubs a dare early in the finals, so later on, the game arms the contestants and tries to spook them into shooting each other, Tommy, or Vee's best friend Sydney, whom the game organizers have kidnapped and thrown into the room. Tommy tells Vee to stall; before his kidnapping, he has managed to call the police.

Vee and Ian realize the row of chairs in the hallway outside the room and curtain are like a stage, so NERVE's wealthy donors must be watching through a one-way mirror just a few inches away. They throw a table through the wall. Vee escapes, and Ian fights off the other players, who realize that if Vee leaves they all lose their prizes.

Vee catches the elevator door before it closes and holds one patron at gunpoint, letting the others escape. Vee steals his driver's license for the police; makes him stop the other players from using their guns on the threat of losing their prizes; and extracts Ian, Sydney, and Tommy from the dark playing room. The four back into the elevator and leave the NERVE controller on the playing floor with the other confused contestants. Vee finds out Tommy fed the organizers her personal information for a dare, injures him, and leaves him. She presses the elevator button to stop at the club floor rather than the lobby.

Vee, Ian, and Sydney exit to the club level to avoid NERVE's armed security at the front and find the crowd thrilled to see them in the same building. A large screen shows NERVE has been playing highlights during the whole escape fiasco. The DJ invites Vee to make a speech, and she warns against the danger and illegality of the game, but no one listens. The crowd picks them up and parades them around, and a fan steals Vee's wallet. The police finally arrive, but with no evidence for them, the three teens escape through the back door. They notice Tommy has already left in his car. Ian drops off Sydney and gives his number to Vee, who promises to see him after the games.

Vee and Ian remain a couple after the games and use their fame to try and unmask NERVE's patrons. Tommy works on tracking down the real identities of the finale hosts, and Vee forgives him. Vee comes back from a run to find a mysterious package from New York. It contains the shoes that she won from her first dare and a note: "I'll never get tired of watching you and can't wait to see you play again". Disgusted, Vee discards the shoes but hears her phone notification, signaling another dare.

== Publication history ==
- 2012, US, Dial Press ISBN 9780803738324, Pub date 13 September 2012, hardback
- 2016, US, Speak ISBN 9780142422830, Pub date 12 July 2016, paperback reprint edition

== Reception ==
Amy Phelps, writing for the Parkersburg News and Sentinel, called the novel "a head-trip of a book, that will make you question the popularity of reality shows and online games."

== Film adaptation ==
Lionsgate bought the film rights to the novel, and in 2014 The Hollywood Reporter reported that Henry Joost and Ariel Schulman would direct the film adaptation. The film was released in the United States on July 27, 2016.
