= George W. Kirkman =

U.S. Army officer (1867–1951)

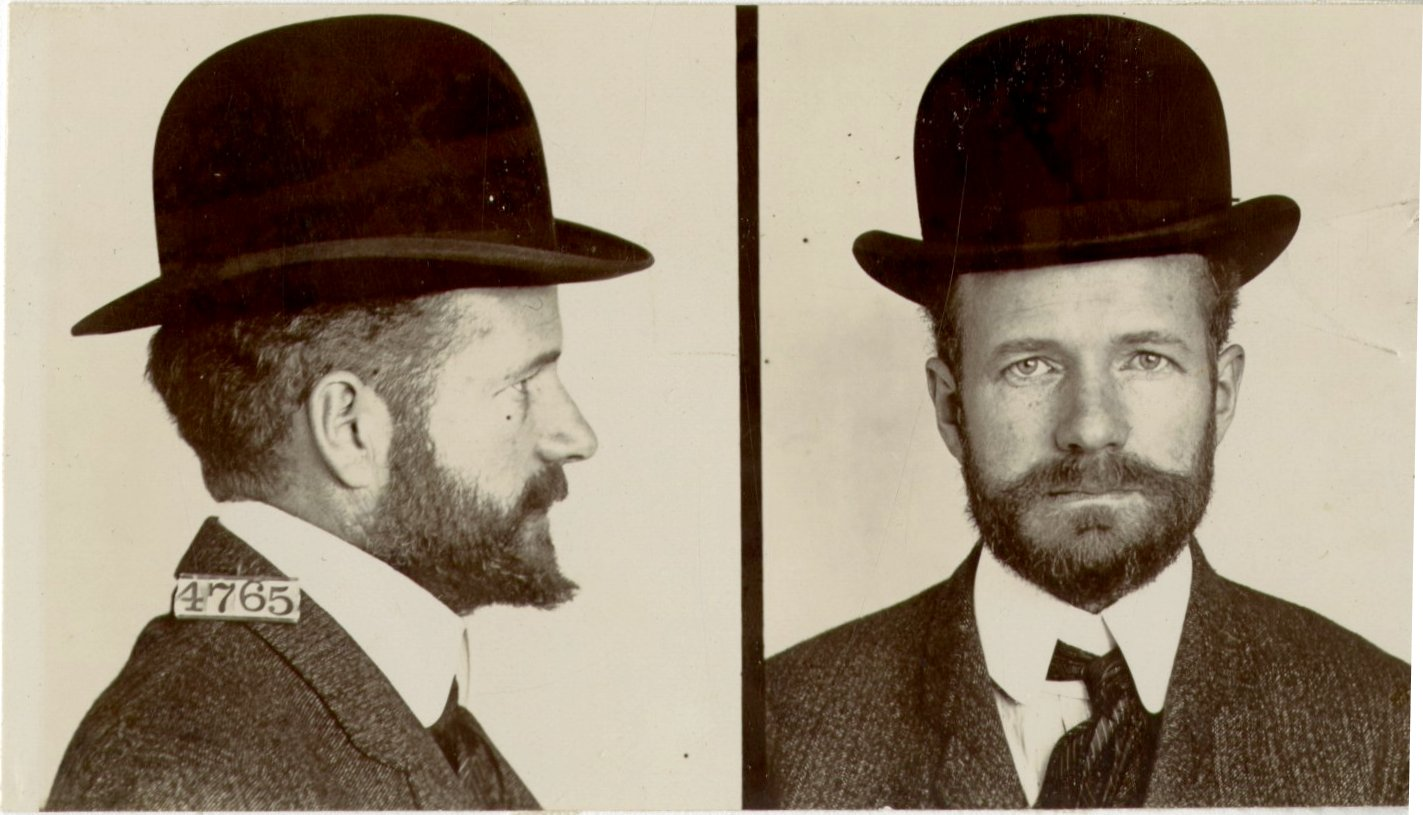
George W. Kirkman mug shot made c. 1904 at Fort Leavenworth Prison

George W. Kirkman (February 26, 1867 – November 14, 1951) was a thrice-court-martialed U.S. Army officer. In later life Kirkman became an amateur historian of Los Angeles County, California, publishing articles about the pre-statehood and military history of the region.

== Early life and training ==
George Wycherly Kirkman was born in 1867 in Texas, the son of Joel T. Kirkman and Lucy Frances Walker. United States Military Academy Cadet Kirkman was first court-martialed, on charges of drunkenness, in 1887. He was initially to be dismissed but authorities intervened and he was sentenced to four months "in the light prison" instead. His Cullum number is 3319. According to the Kansas City Star, Kirkman entered West Point "in 1884 and was graduated class of 1889. He was commissioned second lieutenant, First Infantry, June 12 in that year and joined for duty in California."

== U.S. Army career ==
His first service was at Angel Island. In 1895 he was married at Benicia Barracks in California to Grace Goodyear. According to a history of the Goodyear family published by Grace Goodyear Kirkman in 1899:

He served in the Sioux Indian campaign, in South Dakota, from Nov., 1890, to April, 1891, and organized, equipped and drilled troop G, Ogalalla Sioux Scouts, for service in that war. Served in command of a detachment on a Southern Pacific train during the Great Strike of 1894...[he] was stationed at Fort Russell, Wyoming, until outbreak of Spanish-American War. Served throughout war in command of Co. C, 8th U.S. Infantry, in Cuba, his record at El Caney being briefly given in the following extract from the official report of his battalion commander:

"My battalion at El Caney had the greatest per cent. of killed and wounded, from our being only four or five hundred yards from the enemy, under a deadly fire, for seven hours, a fire more dangerous than any I experienced in the Civil War.

In recommending that First Lieutenant George W. Kirkman be granted the brevet of Major, for distinguished gallantry on the field of battle, I deem it only what is due him. In order to get to his position, he made a charge over an open field, in which there was not the slightest bit of cover, and advancing further than any other Company, brought his men up to within three hundred yards of the enemy's forts, leading his men with great gallantry.

In this charge he lost eleven men killed and wounded, and sustained during the day a loss of seventeen men out of thirty of his command. He firmly held his position, personally bandaging and caring for his wounded men throughout the day, with no assistance from the medical corps.

When a battalion of another Regiment came up behind us, and fired into us, it was he who went up in front of them and stopped the firing. It is no more than justice that Lieutenant Kirkman should be breveted Major, and I respectfully urge that it be done.

[Signed]:

E. B. SAVAGE,

Major Eighth Infantry."

After the battle of El Caney, Lieutenant Kirkman remained in command of his Company through the siege and surrender of Santiago."

On the way to duty on the Philippine Islands he insulted the papal emissary Archbishop Chapelle to such an extent that Kirkland was arrested and court-martialed. Kirkman had apparently been drunk. He was dismissed from the Army as a result of his conviction, but Senator Hawley successfully pushed for his reinstatement. Around the same time he was also under investigation for unpaid bills due to creditors in Manila.

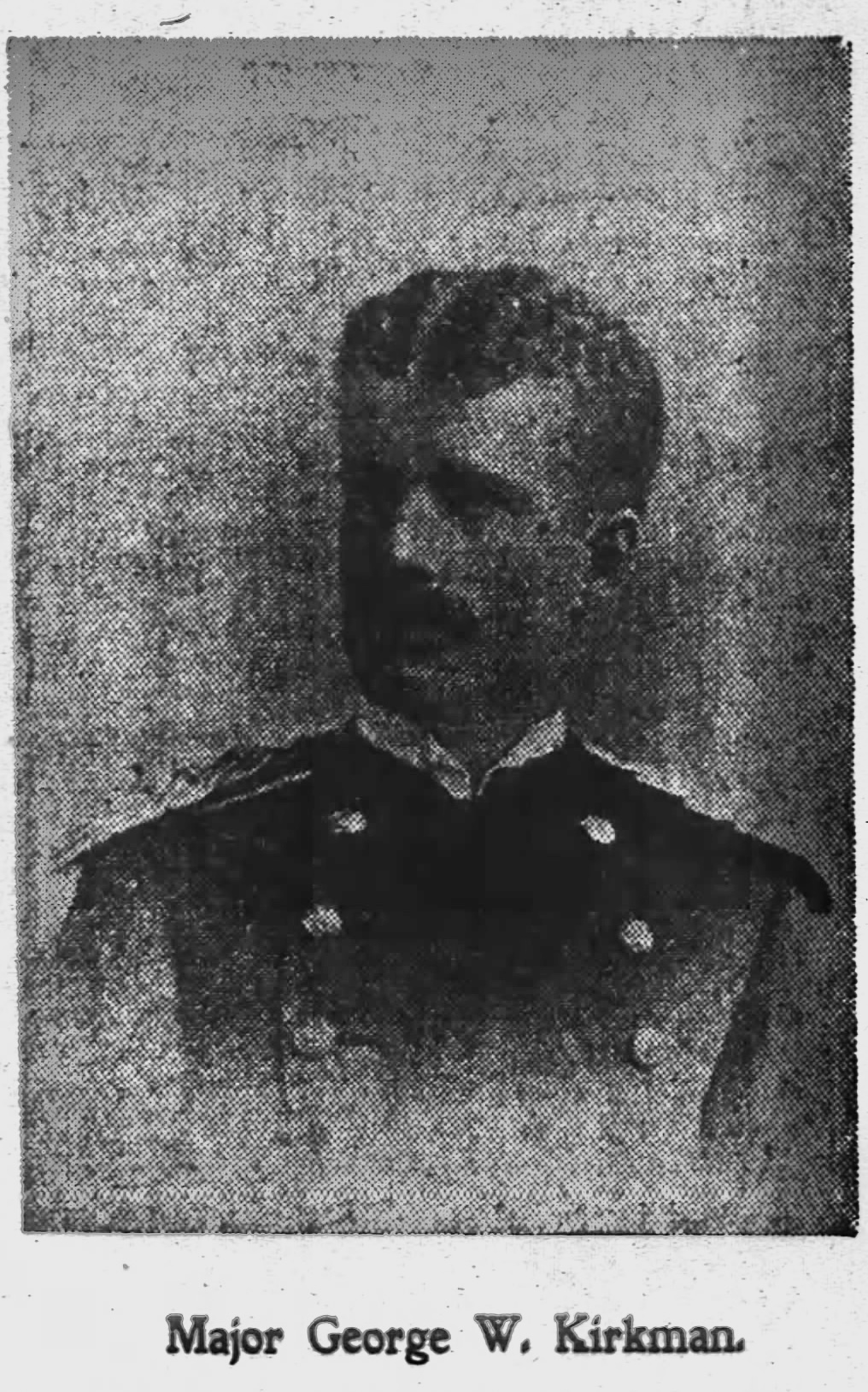
George Wycherly Kirkman in uniform in 1899 prior to service in the Philippines alongside his father and brother

== Courts-martial, incarceration, institutionalization ==
In 1904 Kirkman was wanted for questioning about some bad checks, and shortly thereafter he was arrested for being AWOL. According to the Baltimore Sun, "About a month after Captain Kirkman's arrest in Baltimore, Brig.-Gen. Frederick D. Grant preferred charges against him alleging that the Captain had been absent from his command without leave since September 23. At the time it was stated in the dispatch from Washington that bills for hundreds of dollars for furniture, said to have been destroyed by Captain Kirkman in a New York hotel, had been received at army headquarters." He was court-martialed again, and convicted on 31 counts. He spent roughly three years in Fort Leavenworth, primarily as penalty for misconduct charges involving the suicide of a fellow officer's wife. Meanwhile, the Kirkman marriage had produced two children but ended in divorce; Grace Goodyear Kirkman died in 1909 and her sister requested custody of the children.

In 1916 Kirkman was remanded to the Cook County Insane Asylum, in part due to excessive alcohol consumption.

== Later life ==
Kirkman remarried in Los Angeles in 1926, to Cora E. Curtis. Kirkman became an amateur California historian in the 1920s and 1930s, writing long articles for the Los Angeles Times about the rancho era and the pre-settlement Tongva village Yangna, and producing a well-regarded historical map of Los Angeles County. The Spatial Studies Institute of USC researched the map for a 2023 report on the historical geography of Los Angeles; no sources are attached to the map, which is frustrating for historians, and "given the dedication for the LALAH project to establish a solid and verifiable basis of knowledge about the Los Angeles Landscape, it was tempting to ignore this map given its undocumented sources. After careful comparison of the map with all the other sources we have collected, which includes the contributions of Indigenous collaborators on this project drawing on their tribal memories, we have found it to be highly useful in many respects, and not completely without any footnotes." William R. Harriman, the publisher of the map, is often co-credited for the map in bibliographies, but "it is not clear what role he had in creating the map." The Los Angeles Public Library's Map Librarian Peter Hauge has a detailed description of the Kirkman-Harriman map that traces much of the creation and research. Material on Harriman is in the several articles on the Los Angeles County Farm. The map is discussed in the book Los Angeles in Maps by former Los Angeles Public Library map librarian Glen Creason.

Kirkman died of acute bronchitis and senile emphysema in California in 1951. He was buried at Inglewood Park Cemetery in Inglewood, California.

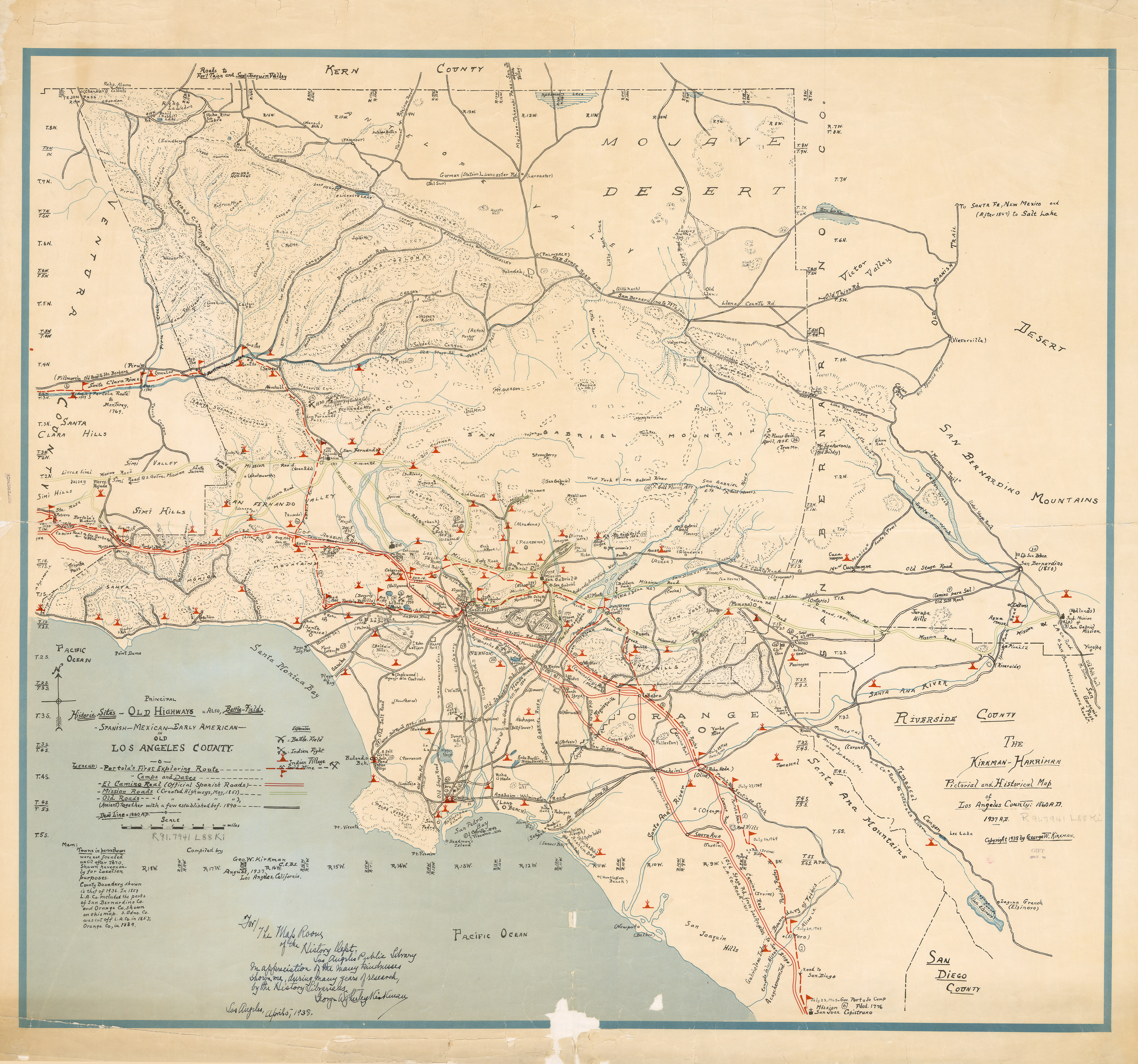
Pictorial and Historical map of Old Los Angeles County hand-drawn by George W. Kirkman and published 1938

== Family ==
Kirkman's father, Joel T. Kirkman, was also court-martialed at one time on charges involving another officer's wife. The father retired as a colonel in 1902, after a long career of service, beginning during the American Civil War and continuing for many decades in the regular army. Joel T. Kirkman had three brothers: one was killed by guerrillas around Memphis during the Civil War, one worked for the Freedmen's Bureau in Texas after the war, and the third became a railroad executive with Chicago and North Western Railway Company.

George Kirkman's half-brother Hugh Tecumseh Kirkman was twice charged with embezzling from the Army. Hugh T. Kirkman was incarcerated at Leavenworth in 1906 and the brothers served time there simultaneously until 1907.

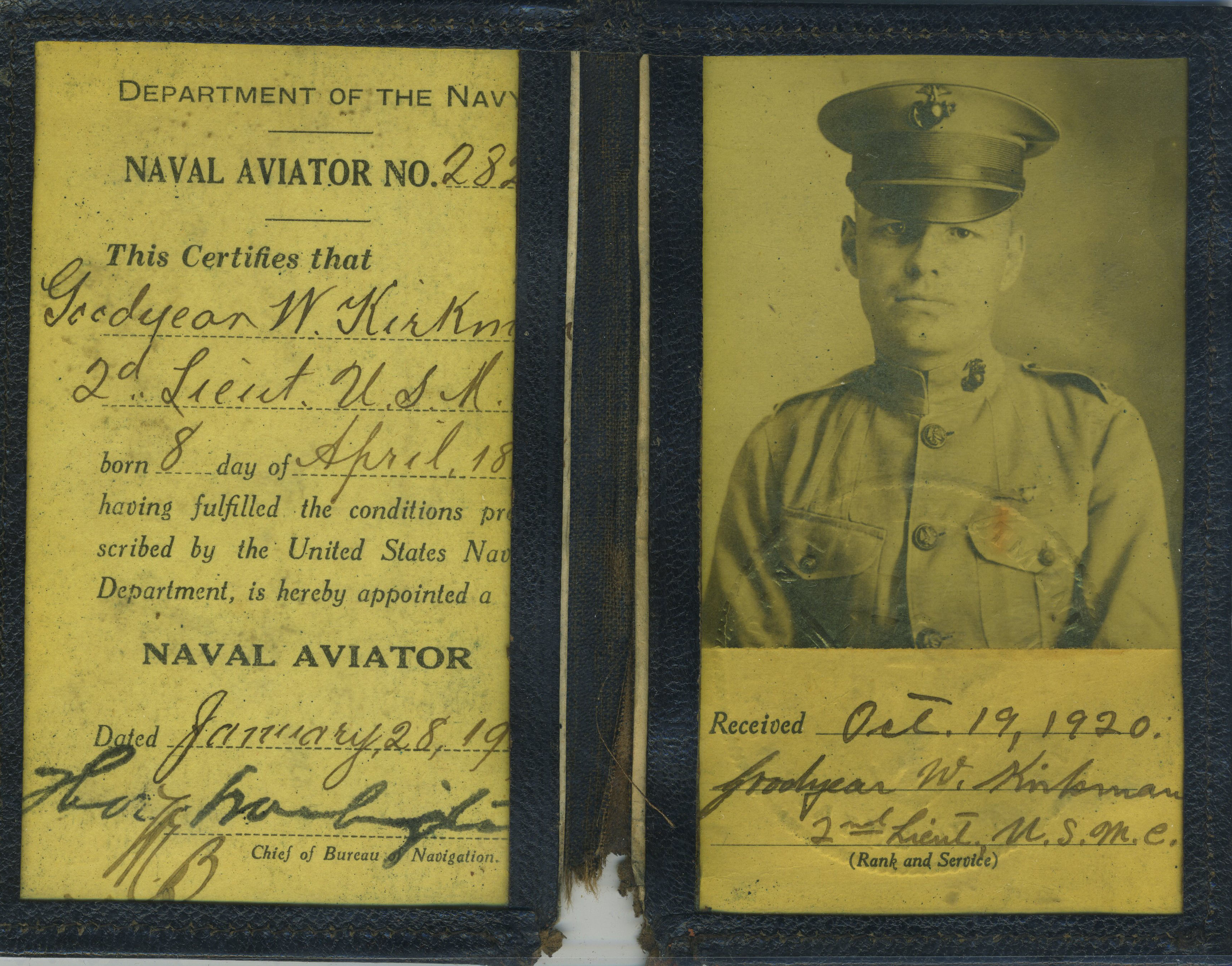
Goodyear Kirkman, 1920

Kirkman's first wife, Grace Goodyear Kirkman, was editor of the Benecia New Era newspaper prior to her death at Adams Springs at age 40. Kirkman's son Goodyear Kirkman was a naval aviator in the United States Marine Corps. According to the USMC Archives, which has a photo album from his time in that service, "Goodyear Wycherly Kirkman was born in Florida in 1896. He enlisted in the United States Marine Corps and, after a brief stint as a Sergeant, was released from his enlisted duties. By June of 1919, Kirkman had been commissioned as a second lieutenant in the Aviation section and was stationed at Marine Flying Field, Miami. He was very successful in this relatively new form of warfare, even praised by his brigade commander for his skill and heroism in flying through a stormy night to deliver medicine to a critically ill patient. In 1924, Kirkman was arrested on the charges of drunkenness and of disrespect, and by 1925 he was discharged."

== See also ==
- Alcoholism in family systems
