= Glen Creason =

American librarian

Glen Creason is an American libriarian who was formerly the map librarian in the History & Genealogy department at the Los Angeles Central Library, a post he held from 1979 to 2021. He is also the author of Los Angeles in Maps and is a guest writer for many publications such as Los Angeles Magazine, additionally serving as a public speaker on the topics of maps, local history, and music. Creason is featured in Susan Orlean's chronicle of the Central Library, The Library Book.

== Early life ==
Creason's family descended from immigrants from the British Isles who came to America in the 1760s. Growing up in South Gate, Creason attended Catholic school. As a kid, his father sent him to sell programs at the Coliseum for real-world job experience. Over time, Creason lived in many areas of L.A., including Silverlake, Long Beach, West Los Angeles, and Culver City.

== Career ==
Creason worked at the Herald Examiner library for two years after college, then was offered a job at a library in San Dimas as a children's librarian. He started as a reference librarian at the Central Library in 1979.

Creason retired in October 2021.

== Feathers map collection ==
Creason was the librarian called when an enormous map collection was discovered at a private residence in Los Angeles in 2012. It was absorbed into the library's collection, doubling its size. Creason is featured in the L.A. Review of Books documentary, Living History: The John Feathers Map Collection, about the collection's discovery.

== Speaking engagements ==
Date	Venue/Series/Medium	Subject
October 28, 2010	Library Foundation of L.A.-sponsored ALOUD series, L.A. Central Library	Maps and map history
January 6, 2011	Google: Santa Monica offices	Maps and map history
September 16, 2011	Libros Schmibros at the Hammer Museum	Maps and map history
July 24, 2013	California State University Fullerton video	Maps and map history
October 2013	You Can't Eat the Sunshine podcast, Episode 39: "Maps & Montezuma"	Maps and map history
Aug. 2014	Stories from the Map Cave; a Los Angeles Public Library series	Maps and map history

== Bibliography ==
- Los Angeles in Maps (2010)
- LAtitudes: An Angeleno's Atlas (2015)
