= Samuel Bradford Caswell =

American politician (1828–1898)

Member of the Los Angeles Common Council
- In office December 6, 1869 – December 9, 1870
- Constituency: At-large

Member of the Los Angeles County Board of Supervisors
- In office 1872–1874
- Constituency: 1st District

Personal details
- Born: January 3, 1828 Taunton, Massachusetts
- Died: February 3, 1898 (aged 70) Los Angeles, California
- Resting place: Rosedale Cemetery
- Spouse: Mary Bradford Gibbs (m. 1849)
- Children: 2
- Occupation: Mining engineer; politician; merchant

Samuel Bradford Caswell (1828–1898) was an American mining engineer, and politician in California.

He was member of the Los Angeles County Board of Supervisors and the Los Angeles Common Council. He was one of the pioneer founders and trustees of the Los Angeles Public Library System to open branches.

== Personal ==
Caswell was born January 3, 1828, in Taunton, Massachusetts. About 1845, he moved to Fall River and, in 1849, to Wareham, where he was married to Mary Bradford Gibbs the same year. They had one daughter, who died around 1878, and a son, William M. Caswell.

He and his family moved to San Francisco, California in the early 1850s and to Los Angeles in the mid−1860s. For many years, Caswell was a trustee in the local American Unitarian Association church.

In May 1895, the Caswells made a trip to Europe, returning aboard the RMS Campania of the Cunard Line.

Caswell felt a heart pain in the morning of February 3, 1898, but went to work as usual. At midday, though, he returned to his home at the southeast corner of West 5th Street and Grand Avenue in Downtown Los Angeles, the site of the present day Los Angeles Central Library he helped found. Later that afternoon, he collapsed and died in a greenhouse in his garden. "The news spread rapidly and many friends of the family hastened to the Caswell residence to offer their condolences and any assistance they might render." Interment was February 6 at Rosedale Cemetery.

== Vocation ==
Caswell was in the mercantile and freight forwarding businesses in San Francisco, California.

=== Gold Rush ===
During the late California Gold Rush, he went to gold fields in Nevada County in 1855, leaving his family in San Francisco. He became a mining engineer and miner, pioneering in the use of hydraulic mining for gold in the Malakoff Diggins area in the Sierra Nevada.

=== Los Angeles ===
He and his family moved south to Los Angeles in 1865 or 1866. He opened a general merchandise store with John F. Ellis at the corner of Los Angeles and Arcadia Streets downtown.

In 1887, Caswell was appointed by a Superior Court judge as a special administrator in the estate of wealthy Los Angeles landowner and entrepreneur Remi Nadeau, whose will was being contested by Nadeau's son, George A.

Santa Susana Mountains oil

Caswel, J.F. Ellis, and H.C. Wiley filed a mining claim for the Towsley Petroleum Mine in December 1876, located in the Santa Susana Mountains east of the Pico Canyon Oilfield near Newhall Pass. 2½ years later, in August 1879, they received a mineral lode patent from the U.S. government, which gave them title to the oilfield.

Los Angeles City Water Company

In 1878, he became auditor of the Los Angeles City Water Company, In 1890, he was arrested "on three charges of violating the water ordinance, charging higher rates than those fixed by the Los Angeles Common Council. He was taken before Justice Austin, where the cases were set for trial, and was released on his own recognizance. There is no record of the disposition of this case.

=== Public service ===
Caswell was elected to the Los Angeles Common Council, the governing body of the city, on December 6, 1869, and served until December 9, 1870.

In 1872, Caswell was chosen to the first board of trustees of the Los Angeles Library Association, which was just then being organized to found the Los Angeles Public Library System with branch libraries. He served on the Los Angeles County Board of Supervisors in 1872–74, representing the 1st District. From 1875 to 1878, he was clerk to the Common Council.

== Legacy ==
Caswell is honored with a plaque in the interior of the Los Angeles Central Library, stating:

In honor of the founders of the Los Angeles Public Library. The first board of trustees 1872–1878. John G. Downey – president; H.K.W. Bent; Samuel Bradford Caswell; R.H. Dalton; W.B. Lawlor; W.H. Mace; J.R. McConnell; Harris Newmark; A.W. Potts; Ygnacio Sepulveda; George Hugh Smith; George Stoneman; T.W. Temple, 1925.

Being Dead They Yet Speak.

== See also ==
- History of oil in California through 1930
