= Auteur =

Leader of a collaborative work comparable to the author of a book

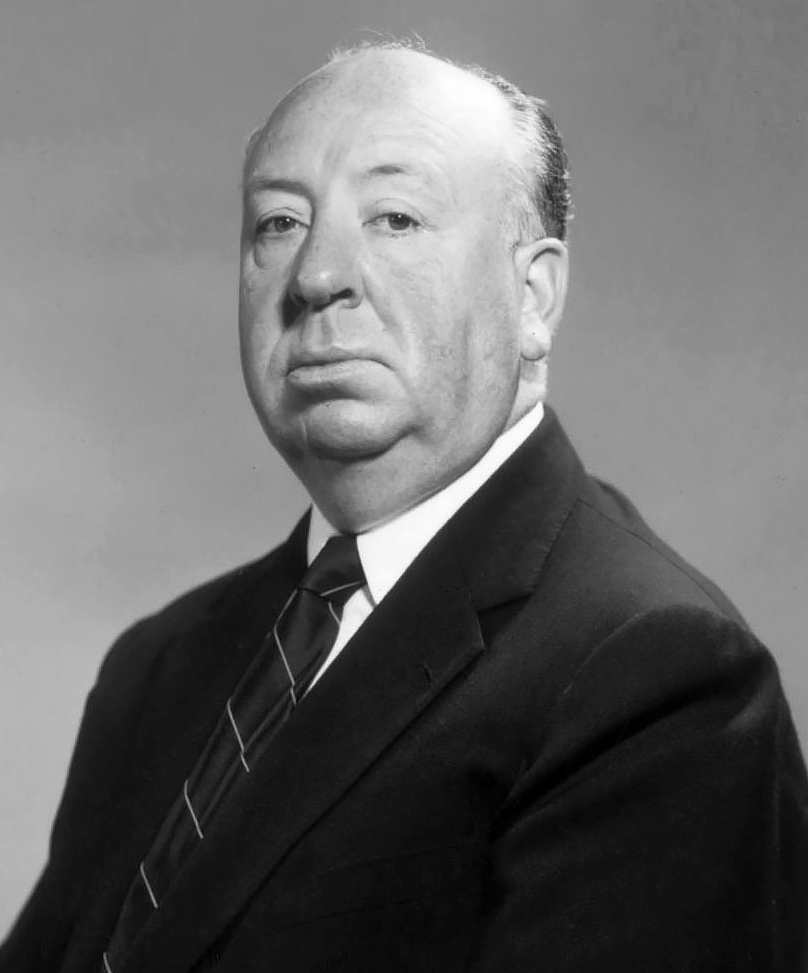
Alfred Hitchcock was often mentioned as an auteur director with a unique, recognizable style that left an imprint of his "authorship" on all of his films.

An auteur (/oʊˈtɜːr/; French: [otœʁ], lit. 'author') is an artist with a distinctive approach, usually a film director who is considered the most important figure in filmmaking, equivalent to the "author" of a novel or a play, such that they can manifest a personal style, vision, and thematic focus across a diverse body of work. The concept distinguishes metteurs en scène—competent directors who make well-crafted films—from true auteurs.

The concept of auteurism originated in French film criticism of the late 1940s and '50s, deriving from the writings of André Bazin, Alexandre Astruc and François Truffaut. In French cinema in the 1950s, when the New Wave began, few auteurs had emerged, a fact noted by Truffaut in his 1954 essay "A certain tendency in French cinema." Some of these film auteurs included Robert Bresson, Jean Cocteau, Abel Gance, and Jacques Tati.

In 1962, the American film critic Andrew Sarris popularized the concept in the United States, calling it the auteur theory. In the 1970s, partly out of wide acceptance of the auteur theory, the New Hollywood era emerged, with studios granting directors greater leeway. In the 1980s, however, several costly box-office failures, such as Heaven's Gate, prompted studios to take back a degree of control from directors.

Pauline Kael argued against auteur theory, saying that "auteur" directors depend heavily on the contributions of others, like cinematographers. David Kipen stated that the screenwriter is a film's main author, a viewpoint termed "Schreiber theory". Aljean Harmetz listed Casablanca (1942) as an instance where the producer and studio head exerted major creative control. Georges Sadoul deemed a film's putative "author" could even be an actor, but that cinema is at its core a collaborative art. James Twitchell has taken these views further by dismissing presumptions of artistry in the field. Acknowledging the legions of personnel involved in commercial filmmaking and its tremendous costs, he attributes the influence of the doctrine of auteurism to the pretenses of the academy, calling it "not much of a theory, but rather an excuse for conoisseurship…. Its attraction was that it cast the studio boss as the heavy and elevated the director to artist," allowing "close reading of film as literature."

Genre theory counters the concept of auteur theory by showing that directors can work in genres that do not require an auteur style to film them. One such well-known genre filmmaker is David Cronenberg, who has mainly worked in the body horror subgenre.

The auteur concept has also been applied in creative work outside of film, such as popular music, where the producer Phil Spector is considered the first music auteur and the Beach Boys' Brian Wilson the first pop musician to write, arrange, produce, and perform his own material. Likewise, in the creation of video games, Hideo Kojima is Japan's pre-eminent auteur video game designer and developer, Hidetaka Miyazaki is known for having "total direction" and a defined style for games such as Dark Souls, and Tim Schafer's work on Brütal Legend has distinct touches of "snappy dialog, quirky characters and strange dreamlike environments."

== Film ==
=== Origin ===
Before the formal development of auteur theory, the producer was considered a film's most important influence. In Germany, early film theorist Walter Julius Bloem explained that since filmmaking is "art for the masses", and the masses "are naturally accustomed to admire that artist who submits his creations to them in tangible, palpable, and finished form", the screenwriter is a film's artist or poet; other contributors such as the producer to a film are merely "apprentices" but not the artist who created "the completed and complex picture". During the decline of studio system in the 1940s, the film director was starting to be significantly held in filmmaking for e.g., James Agee, a leading film critic of that time, said that "the best films are personal ones, made by forceful directors". Meanwhile, the French critics André Bazin and Roger Leenhardt emphasized that directors vitalize films, and through their choices of lighting, camerawork, staging, editing, and so on, express their own worldviews and impressions of the film's subject matter. Alexandre Astruc had viewed the interior meaning in auteur theory as directors who attach their personality into the film. This elevates cinema as an art in what he defined as mise-en-scène. A lot of work in the development of auteur theory also comes from Astruc's caméra-stylo (transl. camera-pen) concept of 1948.

=== Development of theory ===
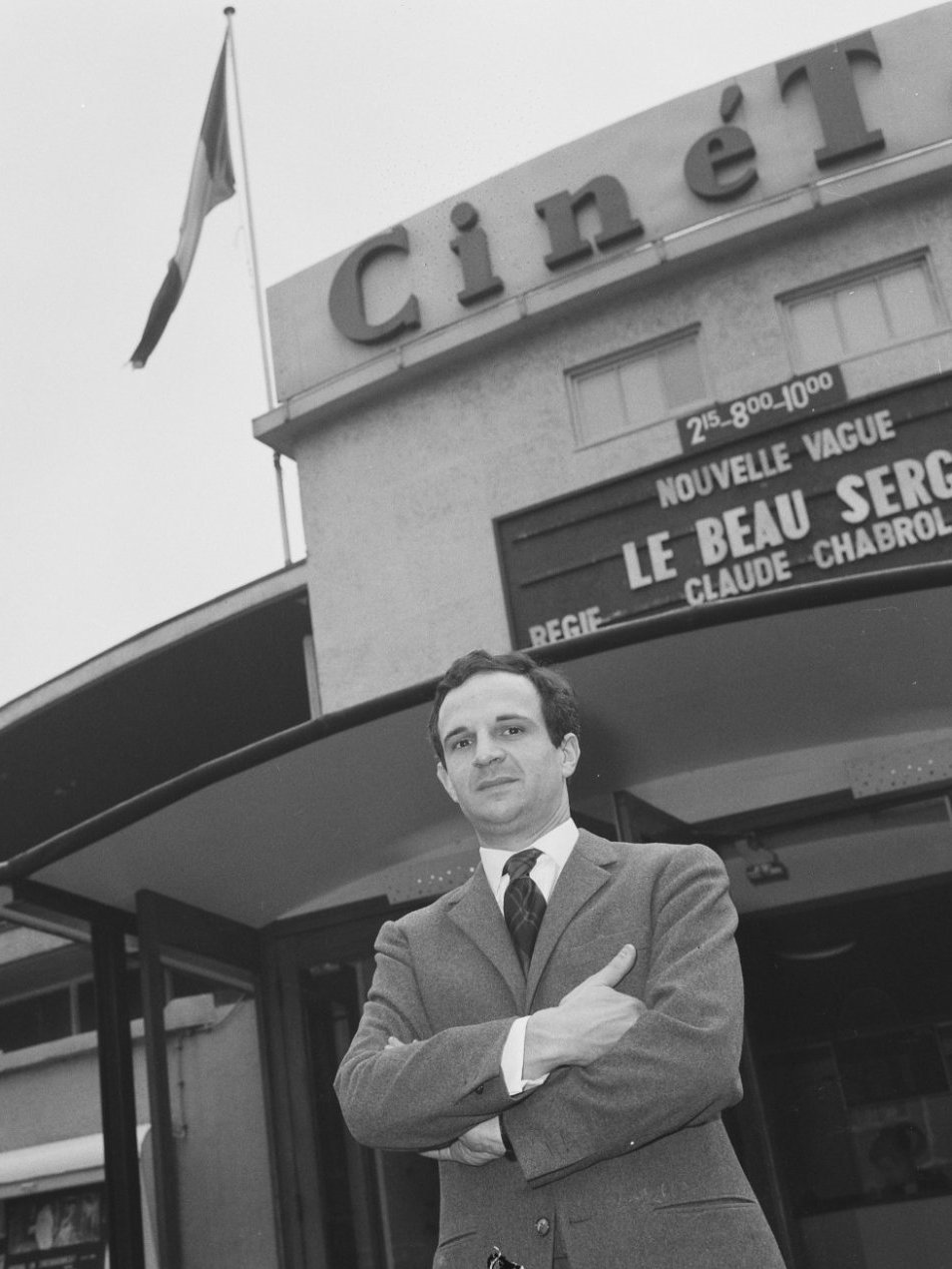
Film director and critic François Truffaut in 1965

As the French New Wave in cinema began, the French publication Cahiers du Cinéma, founded in 1951, became a hub of discourse about the pivotal role of the film director. In a 1954 essay, François Truffaut criticized the prevailing French cinema better known as "Tradition of Quality" (or La qualité française) whereby screenwriters for e.g., Aurenche and Bost, faithful to the script, merely adapt a literary novel. Truffaut added that this practice made the film already made as the screenwriter is metteur-en-scène (transl. scene-setter) when they handover the script to the film director and that they "failed when they tried their hand at comedy" genre. To represent the view that directors who put their personality into their work make better films, Truffaut coined the phrase "la politique des auteurs", or "the policy of the authors" in 1955. He named eight writer-directors, Jean Renoir, Robert Bresson, Jean Cocteau, Jacques Becker, Abel Gance, Max Ophüls, Jacques Tati, and Roger Leenhardt, as examples of these "authors".

Alfred Hitchcock, the well-known British filmmaker had very early on in his career used a directorial style that was at the time against the common norms of filmmaking. One of the devices that Hitchcock was known for is the MacGuffin which he used in Lady Vanishes (1938). In his own words commenting on how he used the device in Lady Vanishes, the MacGuffin is "the device, the gimmick, if you will, or the papers the spies are after... The only thing that really matters is that in the picture the plans, documents or secrets must seem to be of vital importance to the characters. To me, the narrator, they're of no importance whatsoever". His films had a significant impact on the suspense film genre.

Jerry Lewis, a comedic actor from the Hollywood studio system, directed his own 1960 star vehicle, The Bellboy. Lewis's influence on it encompassed business and creative roles, including writing, directing, lighting, editing, and art direction. French film critics, in Cahiers du Cinéma and in Positif, praised Lewis's results. For his mise-en-scene and camerawork, Lewis was likened to Howard Hawks, Alfred Hitchcock, and Satyajit Ray. In particular, Jean-Luc Godard credited Lewis's "personal genius" for making him "the only one in Hollywood doing something different, the only one who isn't falling in with the established categories, the norms, the principles", "the only one today who's making courageous films".

=== Popularization and influence ===
In his essay, "Notes on the Auteur Theory in 1962", published in Film Culture, Andrew Sarris translated the French phrase la politique des auteurs, first used by Truffaut in 1955, into the term "auteur theory". Sarris applied the theory in his writings and reviews for Film Culture and The Village Voice. In his landmark 1968 book, The American Cinema: Directors and Directions 1929–1968, Sarris ranked and classified over 200 auteur directors, which further introduced the term to English-speaking filmgoers.

With the rise of auteur theory, critical and public scrutiny of films shifted from their stars to the creators and filmmakers. In the late 1960s and '70s, a new generation of American directors, in the so-called New Hollywood era, revitalized filmmaking by wielding increased control over their work, at a time when studios granted directors more freedom to take risks. But then in the 1980s, after high-profile failures like Heaven's Gate, studios reasserted control, muting the auteur theory.

=== Commercial and blockbuster auteurs ===
While the term "auteur" is commonly associated with highbrow and critically acclaimed directors, there are examples of commercial filmmakers with a distinctive style who have been labelled auteurs. Director and producer Michael Bay, for instance, was described by Peter Suderman of Vox as a "subversive cinematic auteur". According to Suderman, "few filmmakers are as stylistically consistent as Bay, who recycles many of the same shots, editing patterns, and color schemes in nearly all of his films", which have the commonality of heavy use of special effects, computer-generated imagery and explosions, down to its color palettes and filters, which retain a pattern of "neon color contrasts (especially teal and orange)" while "his movies often appear to take place in a perpetual magic hour, with moody sunsets and sunrises looming in the background". As such, despite the mixed and negative reviews of many of Bay's films, Suderman sums up his filmmaking in being consistently "big, loud, and dumb", which makes him a "subversive auteur".

Another figure cited as a commercial auteur is the American actor and comedian, Adam Sandler. Ethan McGuire of The Dispatch observed that even when Sandler was not yet a husband or father, his film output "was reflecting seriously on what that should mean". Also Sandler is "one of the few remaining popular artists insisting ordinary people have a chance at happiness in America". The review regarded that although Sandler is an acclaimed actor, the films he produced are mostly "fun trash".

=== Criticism ===
Pauline Kael, an early critic of auteur theory, debated Andrew Sarris in magazines. In her 1971 essay "Raising Kane", she argued against characterizing the 1941 classic Citizen Kane as the handiwork of the auteur Orson Welles, claiming instead that the film was a collaboration in which co-screenwriter Herman J. Mankiewicz and cinematographer Gregg Toland were instrumental.

Richard Corliss and David Kipen asserted that a film's success relies more on screenwriting than directing. In 2006, Kipen coined the term "Schreiber theory" to define this point of view. According to French cinema critic Georges Sadoul, while a film's main "author" can be an actor, screenwriter, producer, or the novelist whose work the film is based on, the film itself is always a collective endeavor. In her book Round Up the Usual Suspects, film historian Aljean Harmetz used Casablanca to illustrate a case where the producer (Hal Wallis) and studio president (Jack L. Warner) provided key creative input that shaped the final product. Harmetz writes that auteur theory "collapses against the reality of the studio system".

==== Genre theory ====
In filmmaking, genre studies in film theory have shown that genre theory stands as a critical point against the concept of auteur theory. It suggests that every film belongs to a genre which caters to a film watching audience, film producers, cinematographers and everyone else involved in the process of filmmaking, and not just the film director. Another point made in the theory is that bringing more freedom to an artist (director) than others does not automatically make them a "better artist". The filmmakers belonging to the genre films where genre theory applies include David Cronenberg (body horror of horror genre), Radley Metzger (erotic art genre), and Roger Corman (B movie genre). Notably, the critics from Cahiers du cinéma in 1950s also praised Corman despite not being an auteur according to its standard definition. Film genres that do not commonly belong to the auteur style of films include melodrama and comedy because they depended far more on "narrative structures and ideology" than the touches or devices used by the auteurs in filmmaking.

Thus the theory shows that good and even great films have been made with a negligible directorial control, and that the film narrative is always a work of collaborative effort.

=== Law ===
In some law references, a film is treated as artwork while the auteur, as its creator, is the original copyright holder. Under European Union law as given in the Copyright Term Directive, it states that in all cases, the principal director is the auteur (or author) of an audiovisual work.

The principal director of a cinematographic or audiovisual work shall be considered as its author or one of its authors. Member states shall be free to designate other co-authors.

— Pascal Kamina, Film copyright in the European Union, 2002

Exceptions within some member states of the EU also exist for e.g., in Luxembourg, the general opinion is that the film producer is the owner of the film. Notably, the Luxembourg Copyright Act of 1972 did not use the term 'author' to note any person as the film's copyright holder hence in Luxembourg, the films made can have no author at all. More recently in Luxembourg, the copyright ownership in films has been put concretely by dividing it into Authors' rights and Related rights.

== Popular music ==
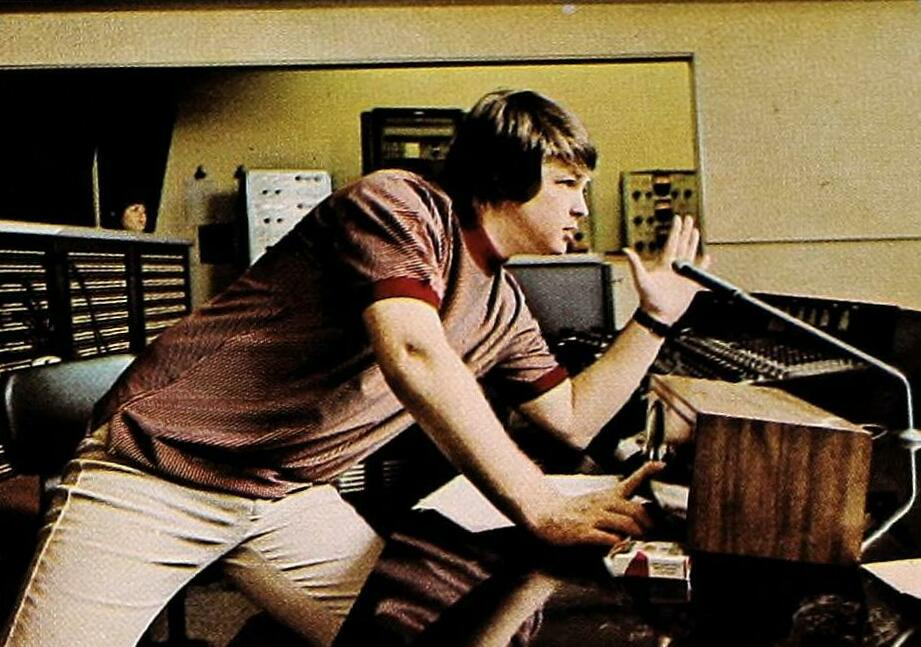
Brian Wilson, pictured in 1966 during the recording of The Beach Boys' Pet Sounds

Using the film's auteur theory, it is seen that the songs performed and written by artists always result in autobiographical connections and show the artist's integrity within popular music. For e.g., the song, 'I will always love you', originally sung by Dolly Parton had a distinct vocal rendition from which the listener would authentically perceive her to be the song's "auteur". Similar examples can be also found in the songs written by The Beatles' John Lennon for e.g., 'Happiness is a Warm Gun' and 'Cold Turkey'.

1960s record producer Phil Spector is considered the first auteur among producers of popular music. Author Matthew Bannister named him the first "star" producer. Journalist Richard Williams wrote:

Spector created a new concept: the producer as overall director of the creative process, from beginning to end. He took control of everything, he picked the artists, wrote or chose the material, supervised the arrangements, told the singers how to phrase, masterminded all phases of the recording process with the most painful attention to detail, and released the result on his own label.

Another early pop music auteur was Brian Wilson, influenced by Spector. In 1962, Wilson's band, the Beach Boys, signed to Capitol Records and swiftly became a commercial success, whereby Wilson became the first pop musician credited for writing, arranging, producing, and performing his own material. Before the "progressive pop" of the late 1960s, performers typically had little input on their own records. Wilson, however, employed the studio like an instrument, as well as a high level of studio control that other artists soon sought.

According to The Atlantic's Jason Guriel, the Beach Boys' 1966 album Pet Sounds, produced by Wilson, anticipated later auteurs, as well as "the rise of the producer" and "the modern pop-centric era, which privileges producer over artist and blurs the line between entertainment and art. [...] Anytime a band or musician disappears into a studio to contrive an album-length mystery, the ghost of Wilson is hovering near."

== Video games ==
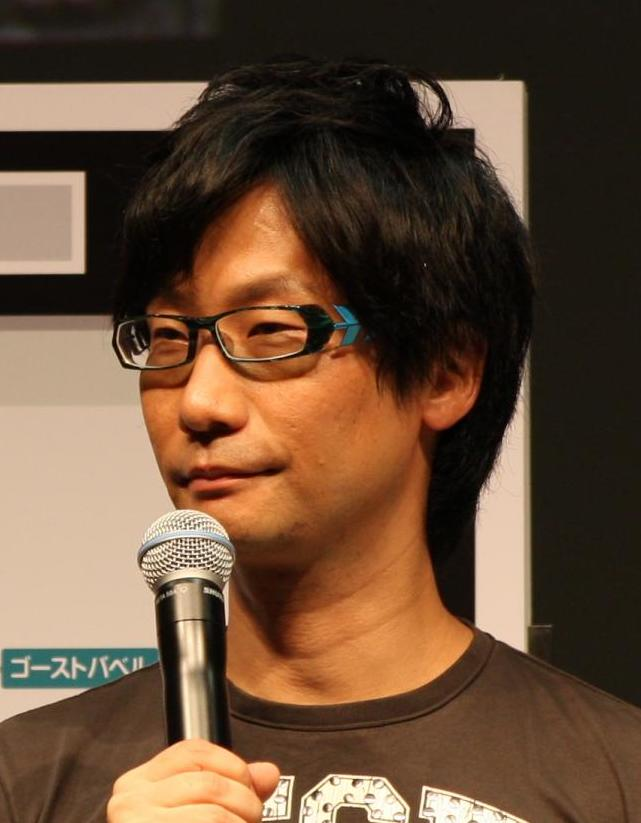
Hideo Kojima during the Tokyo Game Show in 2011

In the video game industry, Japanese developer Hideo Kojima—best known for the Metal Gear series—is often dubbed as gaming's first auteur. According to The Mancunion's Anna Pirie, Kojima's directorial style as an auteur is so easily noticeable that when the "trailer for The Phantom Pain was released in 2012 under the title of an unknown studio, his involvement with the project was immediately identified by fans online". In an interview with The Sydney Morning Herald, Kojima retracted on the auteur claim stating "Video games are interactive entertainment, created through the fusion of technology and art, and I create and deliver that experience for each user to enjoy. From that perspective my job is that of providing games as a service. So, rather than an 'auteur', I believe 'a creator with an auteurist approach' is a more apt description of myself".

Another Japanese video game auteur, Goichi "Suda51" Suda, is known for Killer7 and No More Heroes series. A review from PopMatters compared Hitchcock to Suda, as the latter had a similar "bizarre persona to match the sensibilities of his games".

Hidetaka Miyazaki, who is known for games such as Bloodborne, Elden Ring and most notably Dark Souls series is also regarded as a game auteur. A few months before releasing Dark Souls in 2011, Miyazaki had "total direction" over the game's development as he had provided inputs on "anything from the style of a costume's buttons to the precise angle of a plunging hillside". In a review from IGN, a defining pattern emerged in Miyazaki's games which included low music usage, lack of cutscenes, environmental hazards, areas of complete darkness and puzzling game mechanics.

Keita Takahashi, well known for Katamari Damacy and Noby Noby Boy, is seen as an auteur due to his games featuring unique designs of "playgrounds". The playable characters in both Katamari Damacy and Noby Noby Boy "affect their environment the larger they become" and also that each of the game stories are whimsical which "belie their cutesy visuals".

In North America, similar esteem has been granted to Tim Schafer who has made games such as Grim Fandango and Psychonauts. Glasser's review from Kotaku commented on Schafer's quality as an auteur by judging his work on Brütal Legend. The game satisfied all three of Schafer's distinct touches—"snappy dialog, quirky characters and strange dreamlike environments".

In Europe, Éric Chahi is a notable auteur, who is mostly well known for Another World. Despite directing only three games in over 20 years, Chahi has inspired other game auteurs such as Kojima and Suda, and his games "expose the player's vulnerability through certain game choices, particularly the cruelty of nature".

== See also ==
- Authenticity in art
- Film d'auteur
- La mort de l'auteur
- Philosophy of film
- Vulgar auteurism

== General and cited references ==
- Bannister, Matthew (2007). White Boys, White Noise: Masculinities and 1980s Indie Guitar Rock. Ashgate Publishing, Ltd. ISBN 978-0-7546-8803-7.
- Bloem, Walter Julius (1924). The Soul of the Moving Picture. E.P. Dutton.
- Butler, Jan (2012). "The Beach Boys' Pet Sounds and the Musicology of Record Production". In Frith, Simon; Zagorski-Thomas, Simon (eds.). The Art of Record Production: An Introductory Reader for a New Academic Field. Ashgate Publishing, Ltd. ISBN 978-1-4094-0678-5.
- Caughie, John (2013). Theories of Authorship. Routledge. ISBN 978-1-136-10268-4.
- Cogan, Jim; Clark, William (2003). Temples of Sound: Inside the Great Recording Studios. Chronicle Books. ISBN 978-0-8118-3394-3.
- Edmondson, Jacqueline, ed. (2013). "Producers". Music in American Life: An Encyclopedia of the Songs, Styles, Stars, and Stories that Shaped our Culture [4 volumes]: An Encyclopedia of the Songs, Styles, Stars, and Stories That Shaped Our Culture. ABC-CLIO. ISBN 978-0-313-39348-8.
- Eisenberg, Evan (2005). The Recording Angel: Music, Records and Culture from Aristotle to Zappa. Yale University Press. p. 103. ISBN 978-0-300-09904-1. "The first auteur among producers was Phil Spector, a singer and song writer who moved into production in mid career (at the age of twenty)."
- Kamina, Pascal (2002). Film Copyright in the European Union. Cambridge University Press. p. 153. ISBN 978-1-139-43338-9.
- Kipen, David (2006). The Schreiber Theory: A Radical Rewrite of American Film History. Melville House Pub. ISBN 978-0-9766583-3-7.
- Miller, Jim (1992). "The Beach Boys". In DeCurtis, Anthony; Henke, James; George-Warren, Holly (eds.). The Rolling Stone Illustrated History of Rock & Roll: The Definitive History of the Most Important Artists and Their Music. New York: Random House. ISBN 9780679737285.
- Min, Eungjun; Joo, Jinsook; Kwak, Han Ju (2003). Korean Film: History, Resistance, and Democratic Imagination. Greenwood Publishing Group. ISBN 978-0-275-95811-4.
- Sadoul, Georges; Morris, Peter (1972). Dictionary of Film Makers. University of California Press. ISBN 978-0-520-02151-8.
- Santas, Constantine (2002). Responding to Film: A Text Guide for Students of Cinema Art. Rowman & Littlefield. ISBN 978-0-8304-1580-9. Alt URL
- Thompson, Kristin; Bordwell, David (2010). Film History: An Introduction. McGraw-Hill Higher Education. ISBN 978-0-07-126794-6.
- Williams, Richard (2003). Phil Spector: Out of His Head. Music Sales Group. ISBN 978-0-7119-9864-3.
- Willis, Paul E. (2014). Profane Culture. Princeton University Press. ISBN 978-1-4008-6514-7.
