= Mary Letitia Jones =

City Librarian, Los Angeles
- In office 1900–1905
- Preceded by: Harriet Wadleigh
- Succeeded by: Charles Fletcher Lummis

Personal details
- Education: University of Wisconsin (1885) New York State Library School (1892)
- Occupation: librarian

Mary L. Jones was the Los Angeles City Librarian until she was fired in 1905 and replaced by a man, Charles Fletcher Lummis. Her firing set off a firestorm across the city that came to be called "the Great Library War of 1905."

Jones earned a B.A. degree from University of Wisconsin (1885) and later studied under Melvil Dewey at the New York State Library from which she graduated in 1892. She then served as a librarian at the University of Illinois and the State Library of Iowa.

In 1899, she came to Pasadena and began work at the Los Angeles Public Library, where she served as assistant librarian under Harriet Childs Wadleigh, Los Angeles City Librarian. Jones was hired as the City Librarian when Wadleigh retired in 1900. Jones was the first Los Angeles City Librarian working for the Los Angeles Public Library who was both a college graduate and a graduate of a library school.

Jones was asked to resign in June 1905 by the Board of Library Directors. She delivered a letter to the Board saying that she refused to resign simply to make way for a man: “At first it was my inclination immediately to yield to the request relayed upon me by the president. But, upon reflection, I have concluded that it would not be fitting for me to tender my resignation as the head of a department where only women are employed. When such a resignation is tendered solely on the grounds that the best interests of the department demand that its affairs no longer be administered by a woman. Ever since the adoption of the present city charter, the library has been presided over by a woman with a staff of assistants composed exclusively of women."

There ensued a lengthy debate among city leaders, women's clubs, the press, and librarians nationwide over the legality of her dismissal. Susan B. Anthony attended a library board meeting in support of Jones and later spoke of the library dispute at a women's rights meeting. Eight separate hearings produced over 500 pages of transcripts, but the council upheld Jones's termination.

Jones's record of service and the misogyny directed against her were well documented in newspaper articles of the time, in archival records of the LAPL, and in The Library Book, by Susan Orlean (ISBN 978-1476740188). L.A. City Archivist Michael Holland says although the Library Commission had expressed concerns about her, Jones had received glowing performance reviews year after year. The LAPL had also refused a modest raise in Jones’s salary despite the greater salary offered to Lummis. Wrote Holland, "Jones was fired just before a change to the civil service rules took effect that would have made it harder to fire her without cause. Not shockingly in 1906, several library commissioners said on the record that they preferred a man to be in charge of the library system."

After her firing, Jones left L.A. to work in Berkeley and at Bryn Mawr College outside Philadelphia. She returned in 1920 to help set up the new L.A. County library system.
