= Metteur en scène =

Notion in film criticism

Metteur en scène ("scene-setter") is a phrase that refers to the mise en scène of a particular film director. It suggests that the director has technical competence when it comes to film directing, but does not add personal style to the aesthetic of the film.

The term was coined by Cahiers du cinéma co-founder André Bazin, and the expanded meaning of the term was introduced by the French New Wave filmmaker and film critic François Truffaut in his 1954 essay "A Certain Tendency of the French Cinema", in which he contrasted the inferior products of the metteur en scène with the work of the great director or auteur. The term was adopted and given a new meaning by the American film critic Andrew Sarris's writings on 'the auteur theory' in the early 1960s, in which metteur en scène is the second of the three categories that define a director as an auteur. The term is meant to imply that an auteur's aesthetic style can be consistently detected in the scenography of his or her films.
