= Maguire Gardens =

Park in Los Angeles, California, U.S.

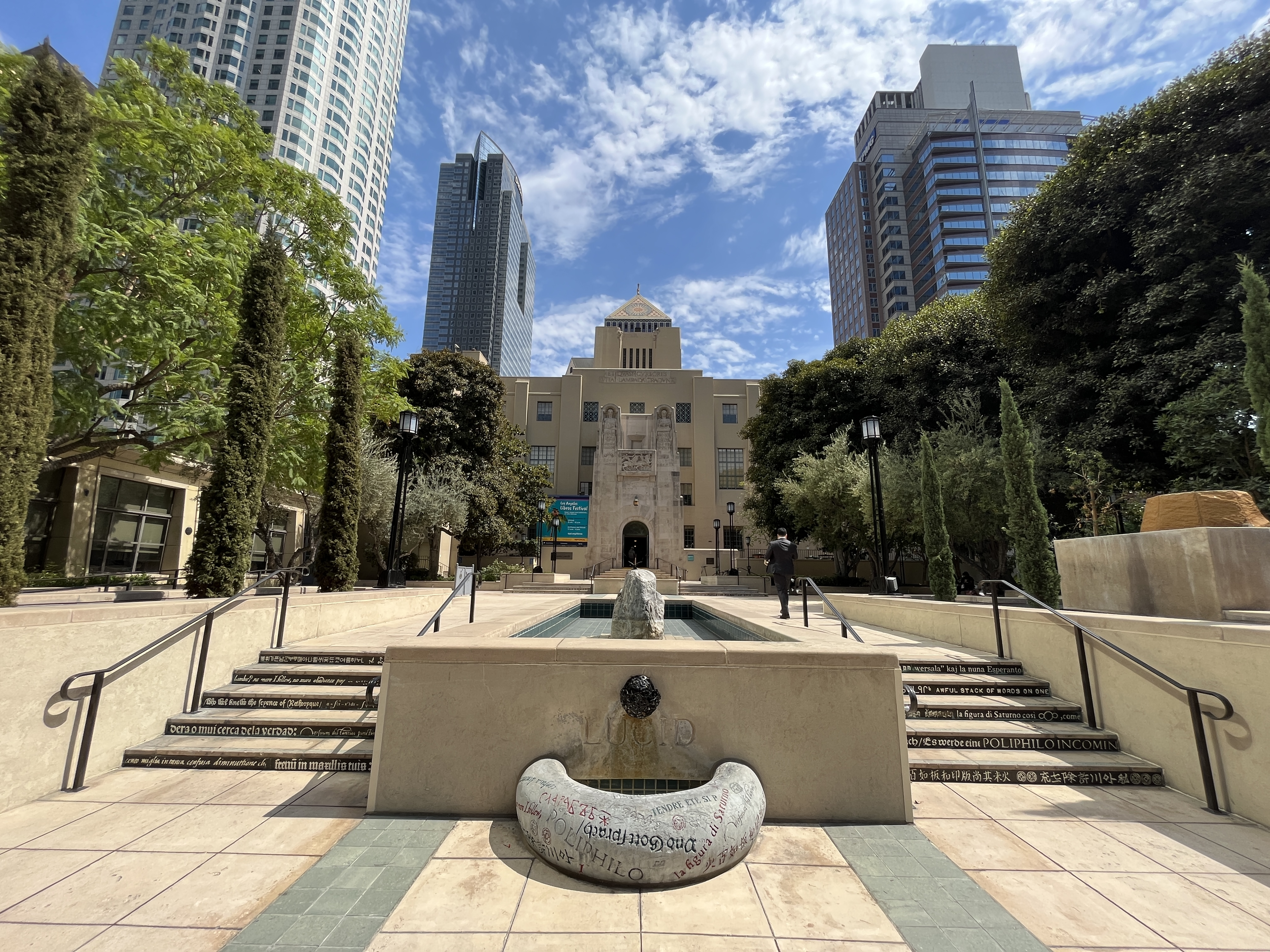
- The park in 2022
- Interactive map of Maguire Gardens
- Location: Los Angeles, California
- Coordinates: 34°3′4″N 118°15′22″W
- Area: 2.3 acres (0.93 ha)
- Designer: Robert Maguire
- Status: Open

Maguire Gardens is a 2.3-acre park in Los Angeles, California, United States. Adjacent to the Richard J. Riordan Central Library, the park is named after Robert Maguire.
