= Los Angeles Central Library =

Main branch of the Los Angeles Public Library

- U.S. National Register of Historic Places
- Los Angeles Historic-Cultural Monument
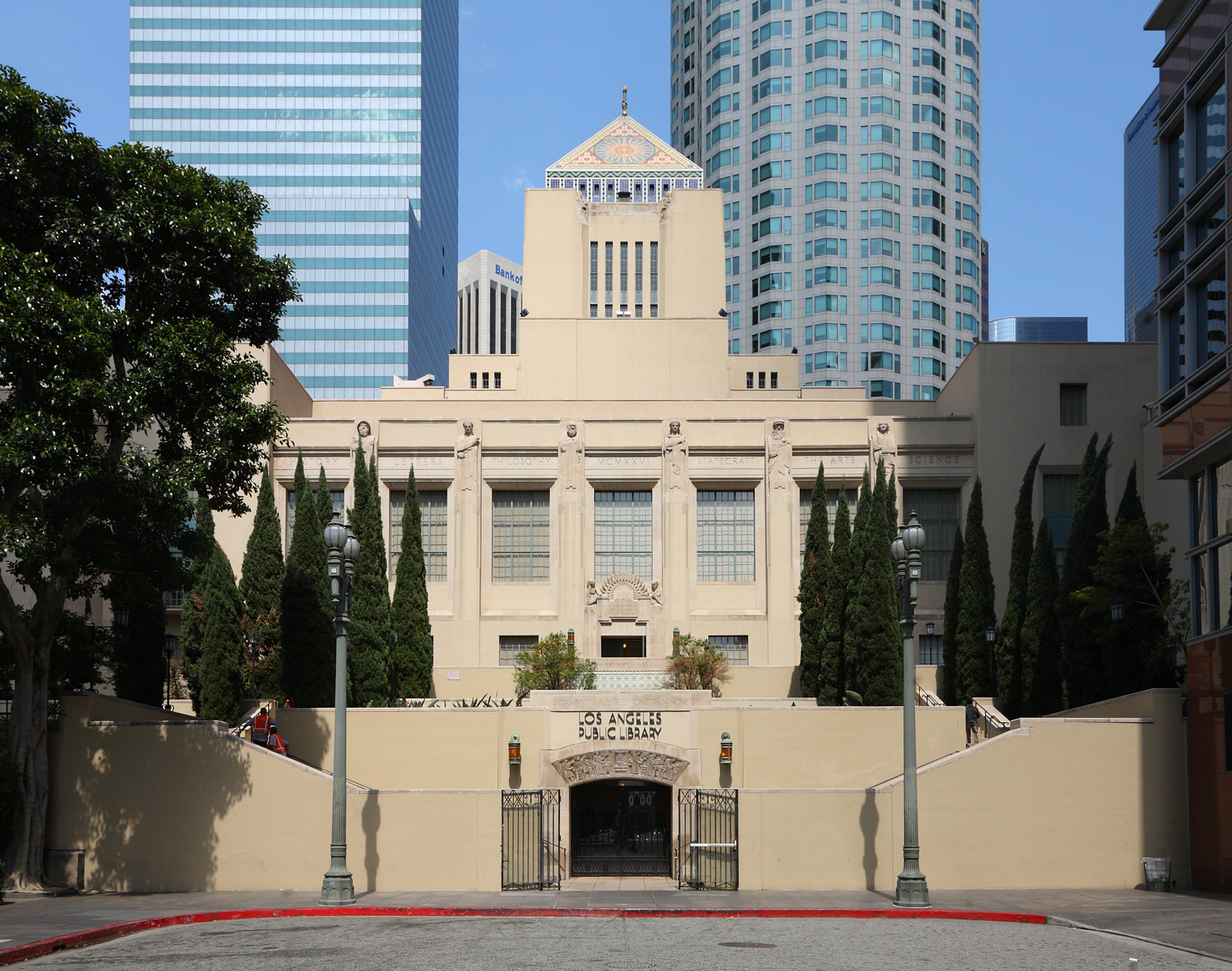
- South entrance at Hope Street

- Location within the Los Angeles metropolitan area Location within California Location within the United States
- Location: 630 W. 5th St., Los Angeles, California
- Coordinates: 34°03′01″N 118°15′18″W
- Area: less than 1-acre (0.40 ha)
- Built: 1925
- Architect: Bertram Grosvenor Goodhue
- Architectural style: Art Deco, Mexican Late Baroque
- NRHP reference No.: 70000136
- LAHCM No.: 46

Significant dates
- Added to NRHP: December 18, 1970
- Designated LAHCM: March 1, 1967

Richard J. Riordan Central Library, primarily known as the Los Angeles Central Library, is the main branch of the Los Angeles Public Library (LAPL), in Downtown Los Angeles. It is named after Mayor of Los Angeles Richard Riordan.

It consists of two buildings: the Goodhue Building and the Tom Bradley addition, from 1926 and 1993, respectively. The former was listed on the National Register of Historic Places (NRHP) on December 18, 1970.

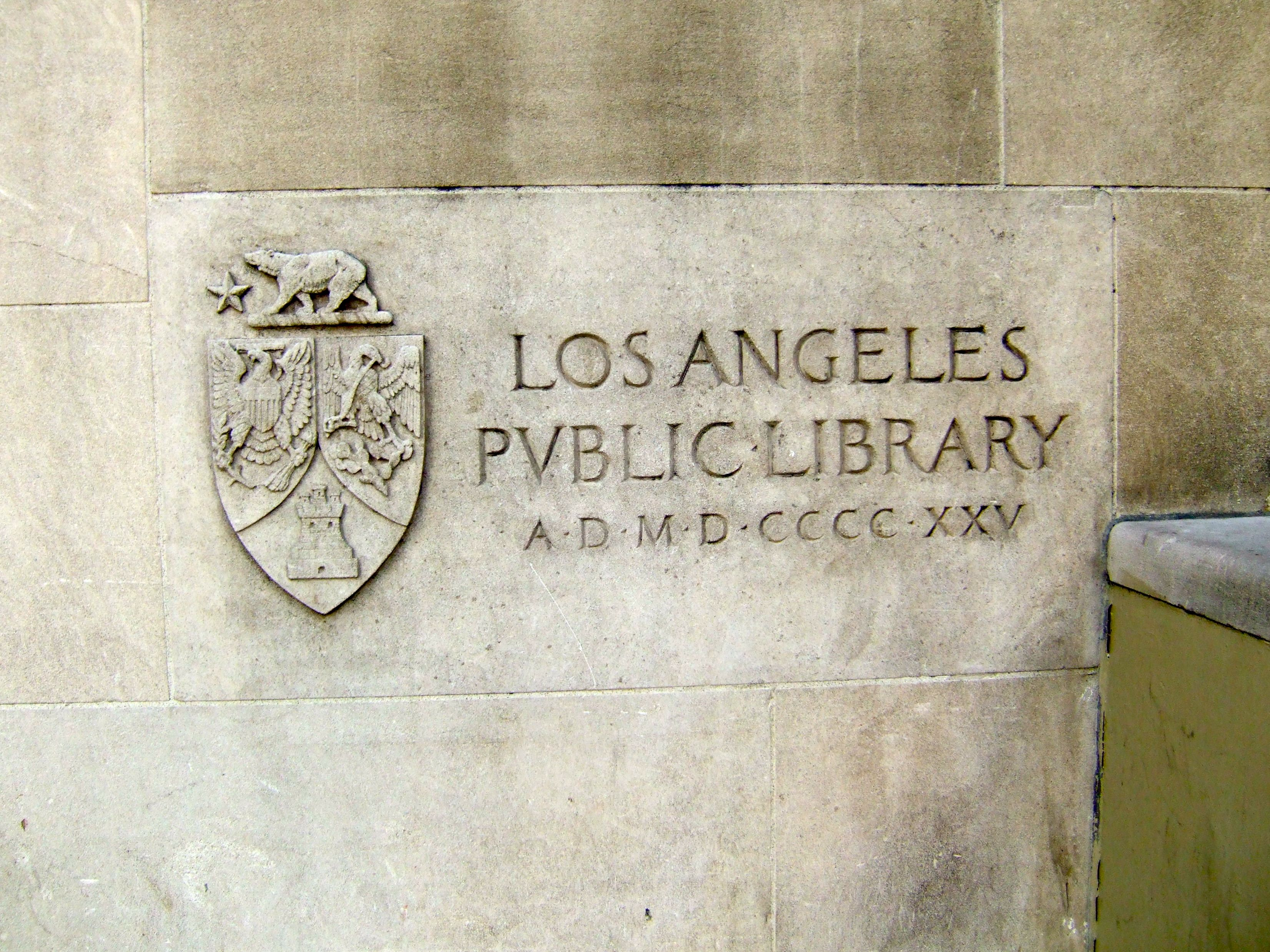
Cornerstone of the original building, laid in 1925

External videos
- "Los Angeles Public Library Tour", April 27, 1999, C-SPAN

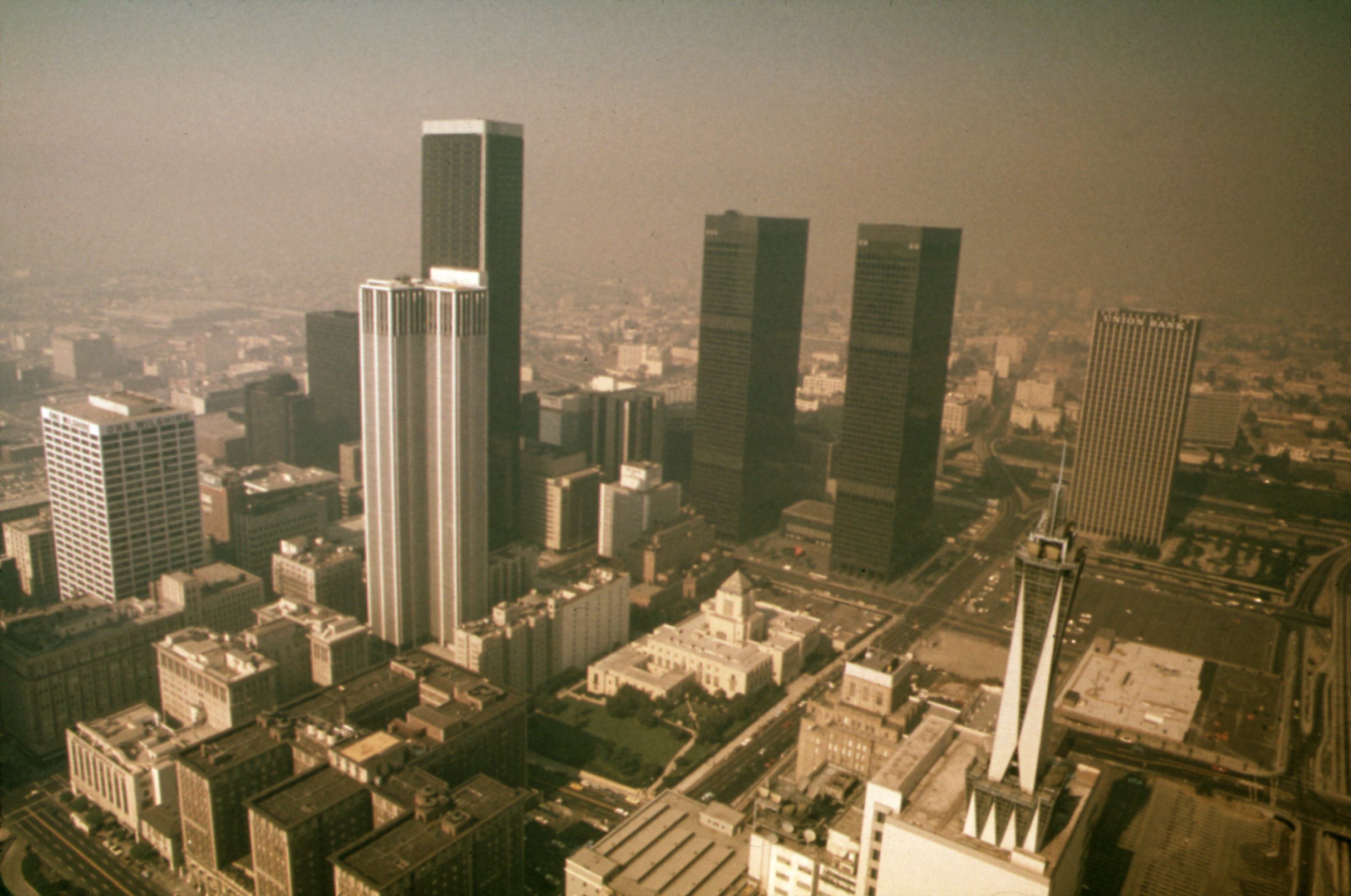
Los Angeles Central Library in 1973 (center of picture)

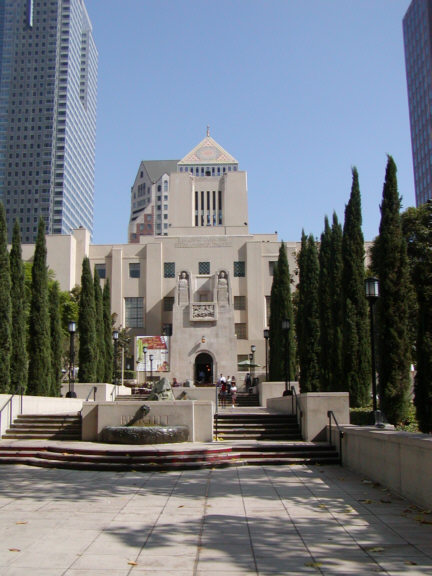
Los Angeles Central Library at Flower Street

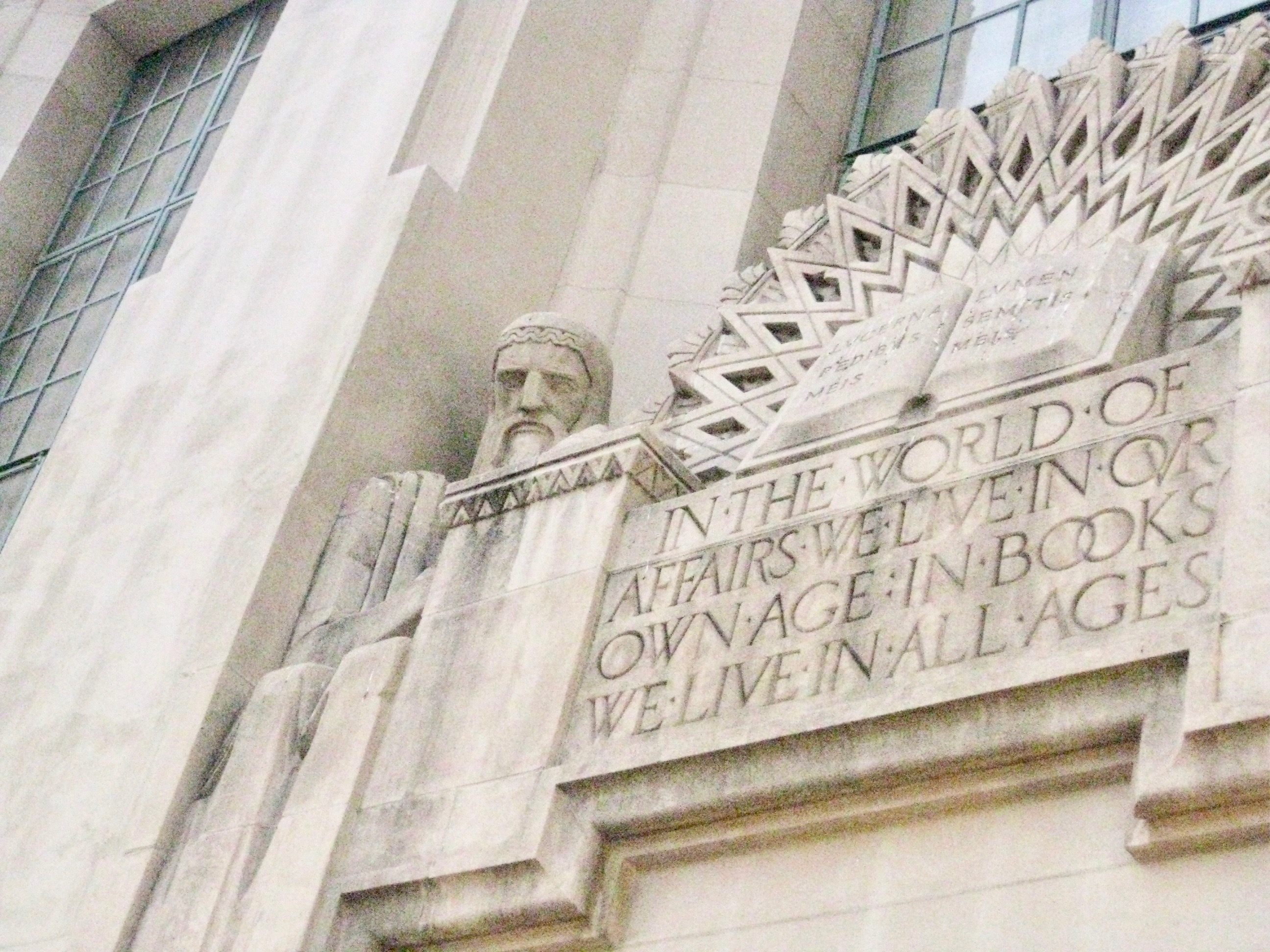
Inscription on exterior of the library.

== History ==
The historic Central Library Goodhue building was constructed between 1924 and 1926 and is a Downtown Los Angeles landmark. The Central Library opened its doors to the public in a soft opening on July 6, 1926 followed by a ceremonial formal opening on July 15, 1926. The Central Library was designed by the architect Bertram Goodhue. The Richard J. Riordan Central Library complex is the third largest public library in the United States in terms of book and periodical holdings. Originally named the Central Library, the building was first renamed in honor of the longtime president of the Board of Library Commissioners and President of the University of Southern California, Rufus B. von KleinSmid. The new wing of the Central Library, completed in 1993, was named in honor of former mayor Tom Bradley.

An expansion/renovation was proposed from circa 1966, but the library system did not enact them until 1986. From 1988 through 1993, the Central Library was extensively renovated and expanded in a Modernist/Beaux-Arts style, according to Norman Pfeiffer of Hardy Holzman Pfeiffer Associates, the principal architect of the renovation.

The building's limited access had caused a number of problems. Generally, the accessible public stacks in the reading rooms only displayed about 10 to 20 percent of the actual collections of the Central Library. For anything else, a patron had to submit a request slip and a clerk would retrieve the desired material from the internal stacks. The internal stacks, contained in two concrete structures joined by a catwalk, were packed very tightly and had very little headroom. For example, while the normal reading rooms had ceilings of anywhere from 10 to 15 feet (3.0 to 4.6 m), the internal stack areas were many shelves of about six-foot (1.8 m) height, stacked internally, so that while the public access area was about two floors plus the Science and Technology alcove, the internal stacks were approximately five or six floors. To fix this would have required substantial renovation, a cost the city was not willing to cover, especially after hours of operation were cut in response to the 1978 property tax reduction measure Proposition 13.

=== Arson ===
The library experienced two fires in 1986, one on April 29 and one on September 3, both due to arson. The April 29 arson fire "destroyed 20 percent of the central library collection" and came "amid prolonged public debate concerning the future of the Goodhue building, which for years had been cited for major fire and safety hazards". This fire was the catalyst for the renovation. Although the building was safely evacuated, its vintage construction precluded the ventilation of heat and smoke, and limited firefighter access. It took firefighters over seven hours to extinguish the fire and little fires continued to sprout for several days. Some 400,000 volumes—20 percent of the library's holdings—were destroyed, with significant water and smoke damage to 700,000 more. The estimated cost for replacing the 400,000 works lost was over $14 million.

A second fire, on September 3 of the same year, destroyed the contents of the music department reading room. After the second it remained closed until 1993, when its renovation was completed.

=== Renovation ===
As part of the rehabilitation plan, LAPL sold its air rights to developers, enabling the construction of the eponymous Library Tower across the street. The skyscraper was subsequently renamed the First Interstate World Center and later the U.S. Bank Tower. Additional funds were raised through corporate and personal contributions which flowed from the effort of the "Save the Books" campaign formed by Mayor Tom Bradley. Among the findings during the re-cataloguing of the library's collections was a Shakespeare Fourth Folio.

The campaign, co-chaired by Lodwrick Cook, then CEO of Atlantic Richfield Company (ARCO) had targeted a goal to raise $10 million through corporate and individual contributions ranging from schoolchildren's nickels and dimes to $50,000 contributions by Los Angeles businessman Marvin Davis and MCA Chairman Lew Wasserman. William Eugene "Gene" Scott, an LAPL neighbor and member of the 43 strong blue ribbon committee, donated the use of his University Network television studios and himself to what became a 48-hour telethon to raise $2 million towards the total objective.

The Library's renovation was completed in 1993. It included a large new underground parking facility, with a park designed by Lawrence Halprin over it. The Central Library reopened on October 3, 1993. The original Goodhue building and the Bradley wing was subsequently renamed in 2001 for former Los Angeles Mayor Richard Riordan, as the Richard Riordan Central Library. Michael Finnegan of the Los Angeles Times wrote that initially there was some "political uproar" but as the renaming came it "was all but forgotten".

=== Central 100 ===
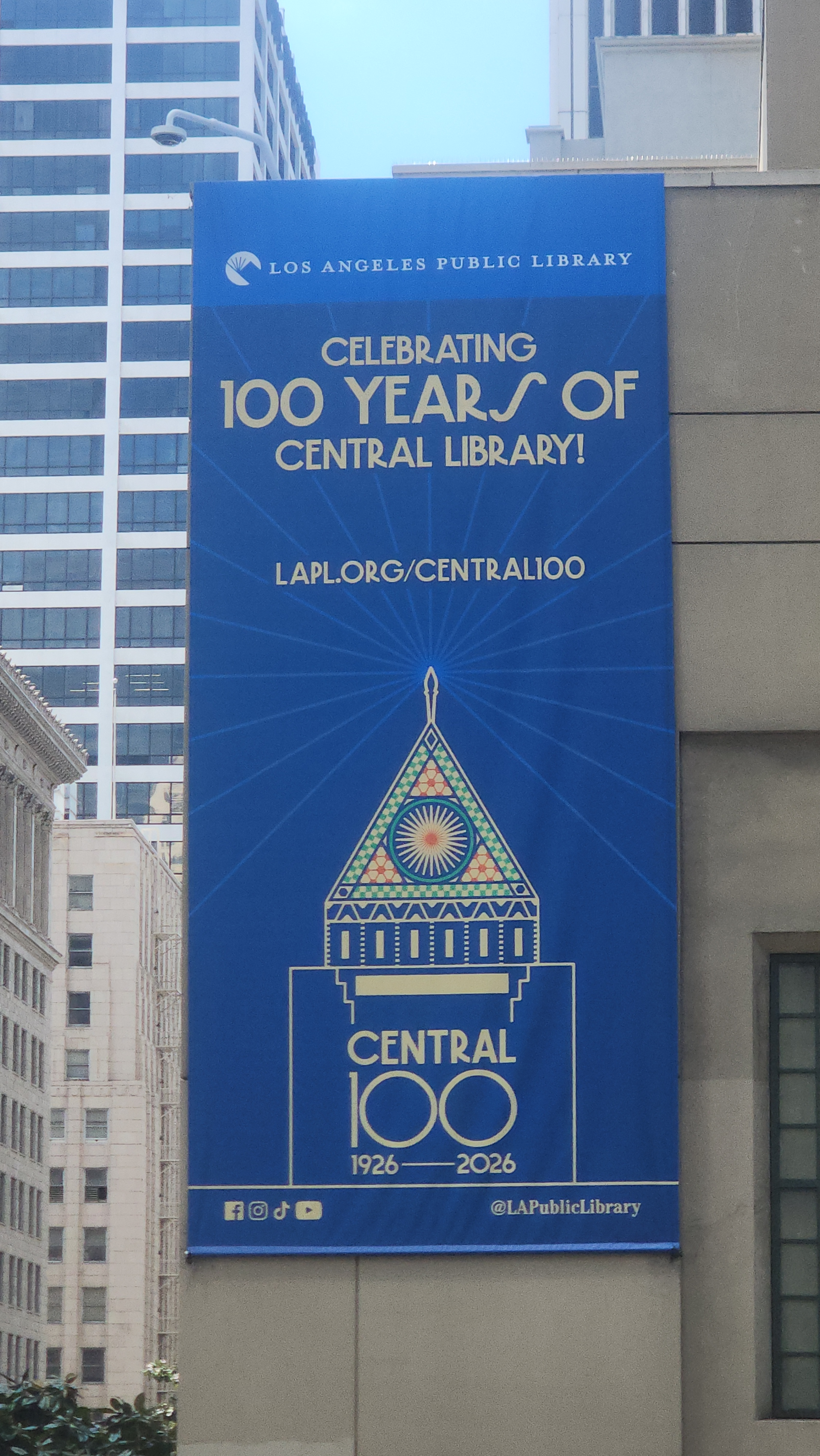
The 100th Anniversary Banner of Central Library located at the 5th Street entrance in 2026

In 2026, the Central Library Goodhue building is celebrating the 100th Anniversary of the construction and opening of the Central Library building under the theme of "Central 100." This included the opening of a 101 year old time capsule on January 29, 2026 that was placed in the building's cornerstone during construction in 1925. Exhibitions will be held throughout the Central Library building all throughout 2026 which will highlight the 100 year history of the building. A podcast series will also be aired each month called "Past Due: 100 of Central Library" about the history of the Central Library building and Los Angeles Public Library. A Central Library Centennial Festival will also being held on July 11, 2026, featuring free programs, performances, exhibits, hands-on activities, and special guests.

== Architecture ==
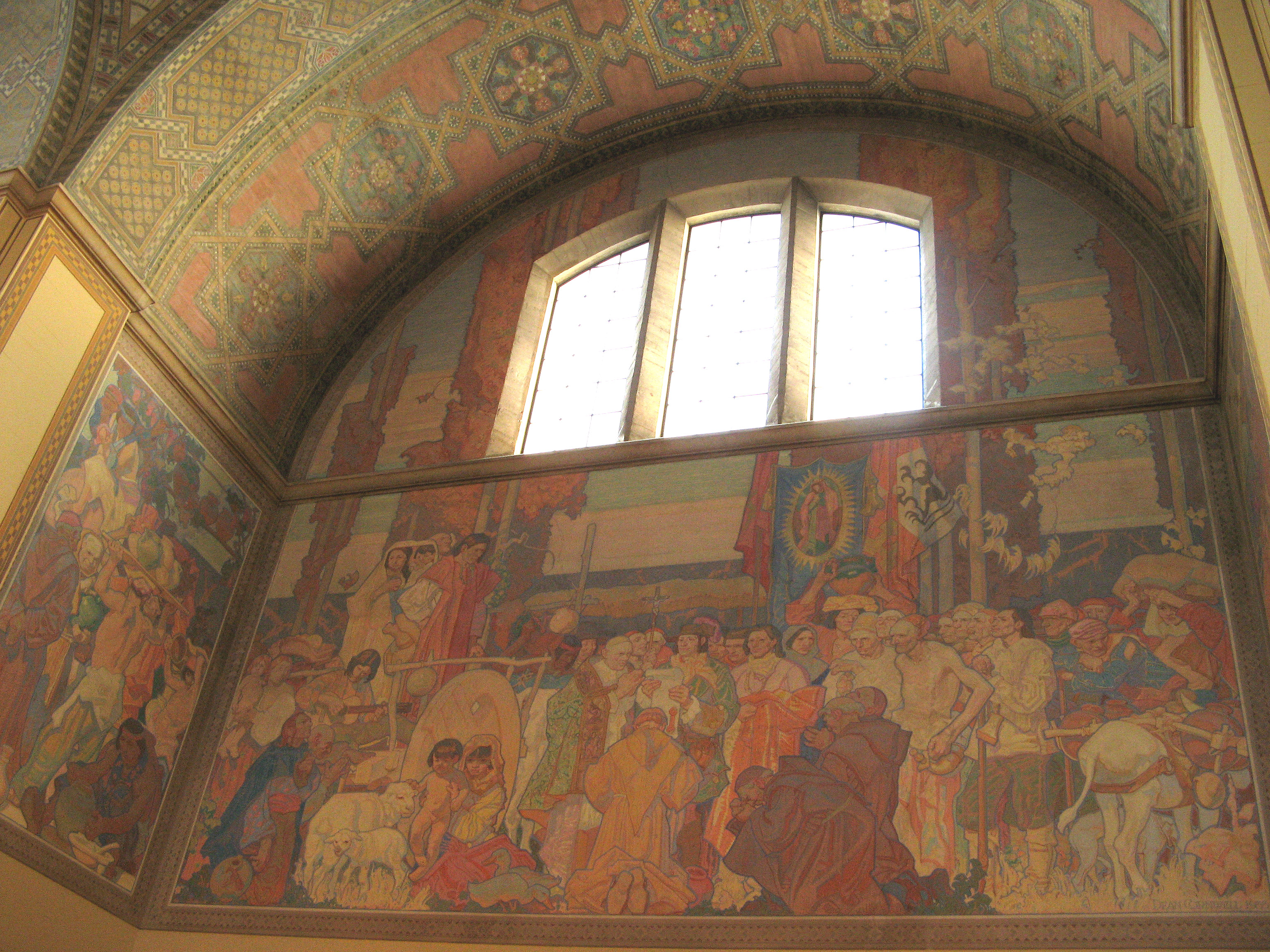
A portion of the four-part mural by illustrator Dean Cornwell depicted the stages of the history of California at the Los Angeles Central Library.

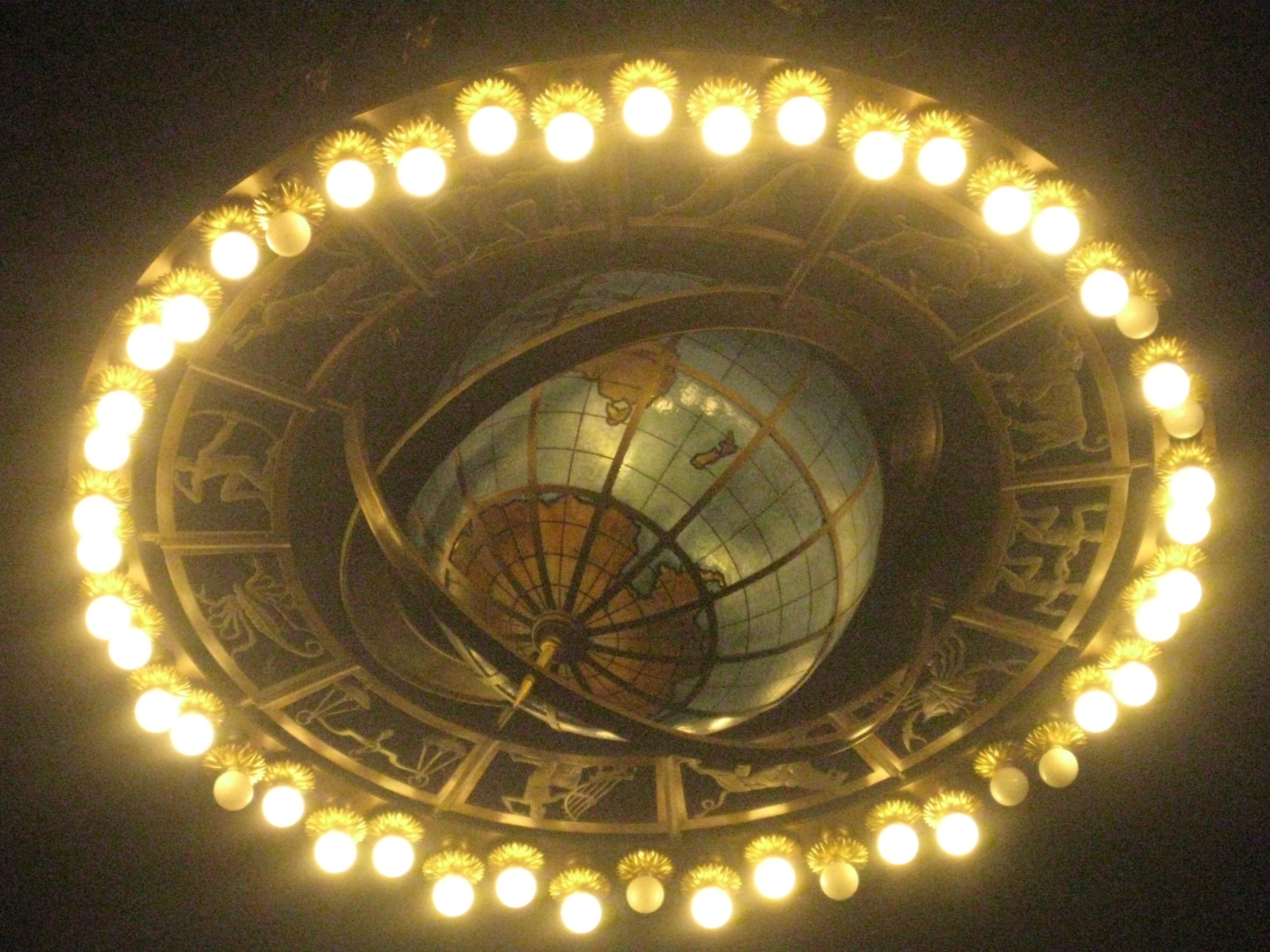
Showpiece zodiac chandelier designed by Lee Lawrie and modeled by Goodhue Associates.

Goodhue designed the original Los Angeles Central Library with influences of ancient Egyptian and Mediterranean Revival architecture. The central tower is topped with a tiled mosaic pyramid with suns on the sides with a hand holding a torch representing the "Light of Learning" at the apex. Other elements include sphinxes, snakes, and celestial mosaics. It has sculptural elements by the preeminent American architectural sculptor Lee Lawrie, similar to the Nebraska State Capitol in Lincoln, Nebraska, also designed by Goodhue. The interior of the library is decorated with various figures, statues, chandeliers, and grilles, notably a four-part mural by illustrator Dean Cornwell depicting stages of the History of California which was completed around 1933. The building is a designated Los Angeles Historic-Cultural Monument, and is on the National Register of Historic Places.

The 360,000-square-foot (33,000 m^{2}) addition, eight stories tall, had a cost of $213.9 million. The addition has about the same size as the original building. The project included a garage with 940 spaces, an atrium with a glass roof, an auditorium with capacity for 235 people, and a puppet theater. Amy Wallace of the Los Angeles Times wrote that "Where the old edifice was cramped, the new is expansive and imaginative". Christopher Knight of the Los Angeles Times described the wing as "a major architectural disappointment" but wrote that some of the public art commissioned to be installed in the building "partially mitigates the fiasco."

The expansion included an enormous, eight-story atrium wing dedicated to former mayor Tom Bradley. Now, the library contains an area of 538,000 square feet (50,000 m^{2}), and has nearly 89 miles (143 km) of shelves and seating for over 1,400 people.

== Collections and departments ==
TESSA (tessa.lapl.org), named after Tessa Kelso, is the Los Angeles Public Library website for online (photos and other digital) historical collections, that also includes scanned copies from these physical collections:

=== Los Angeles Public Library Photo Collection ===
The Central Library houses and archives the extensive Los Angeles Public Library Photo Collection of over 3 million historic photographs from varied sources and collection acquisitions. Many images can be viewed by the public via the online photo collection. The physical Photo Collection is an important resource for researchers, writers, curators, and educators.

==== Sources ====
The Photo Collection's sources have included: the former Los Angeles Herald-Examiner newspaper photo morgue (2.2 million images); the Security Pacific Bank Collection (250,000); the Los Angeles Chamber of Commerce image archives (60,000), Hollywood Citizen News/Valley Times Newspaper Collection (30,000), and the 'Turn of the century Los Angeles' collection (150,000).

Collection sources also include the portfolios by noted local and regional photographers, such as: the Ralph Morris Archives (25,000) of the Los Angeles area from 1939 to the late 1970s; a collection of 1940s L.A. images taken and donated by Ansel Adams, and the William Reagh Collection (40,000 with 800 online) of post-war Los Angeles to 1991.

==== Shades of L.A. ====
The "Shades of L.A. Collection" is an archive of more than 10,000 images donated/duplicated from family photo albums (collected by former Photo Collection director Carolyn Kozo Cole) that expanded the archives to include the many diverse ethnic histories of people in the city, beyond the already well represented 'Anglo' population.

The project's success expanded to the California State Library creating the "Shades of California" collection to represent the state's diverse communities, using the LAPL methods and model. The book "Shades of California: The Hidden Beauty of Ordinary Life" resulted from the successful statewide project. Over a dozen California city and county library districts also created local Shades of California collections, such as Monterey, Riverside, and Humboldt County.

=== Science, Technology & Patents Department ===
Located on Lower Level 2 of Central Library's Tom Bradley Wing, the Science, Technology & Patents Department's diverse collection covers agriculture, automobile repair, computers & computer science, cooking, construction (including building codes), consumer information, cosmetology, engineering, mathematics, medicine, nutrition, pets, psychiatry, UFOs, zoology, and more.

In partnership with the United States Patent and Trademark Office, the Science, Technology & Patents Department is a United States Patent & Trademark Resource Center, offering resources to assist with patent and trademark research. The department holds a complete collection of all Patent and Trademark Office (PTO) publications including the complete Patent Gazette and Trademark Gazette issues from the opening of the PTO, and a complete set of registration books published by the United States Copyright Office starting from Volume 1. The patent collection also includes United Kingdom Old Law Patents 1617–1981 and United Kingdom New Law Applications 1979–1994.

=== Feathers map collection ===
In 2012 Glen Creason, the map librarian for the central library, was invited to the Mount Washington home of John Feathers, who had died at age 56 with no known relatives. According to Creason, the cottage contained approximately 100,000 maps and the library was delighted to accept their donation. "This dwarfs our collection," he said, "and we've been collecting for 100 years." The maps were stored on shelves, in boxes, in file cabinets, and even in the cabinet of an old stereo system with its electronics removed.

Creason said it could take a year to catalog and organize the maps and 600 feet (180 m) of shelving would be needed, but the library would then have the fifth-largest map collection in the country. The collection has been sorted and organized by volunteers C.J. Moon and Audrey Dalton.

Creason retired from the library in October 2021. As of August 2023, Peter Hauge has served as the Map Librarian overseeing the collection.

== See also ==
- Maguire Gardens
