= Schreiber theory =

The Schreiber theory is a writer-centered approach to film criticism and film theory which holds that the principal author of a film is generally the screenwriter rather than the director. The term was coined by David Morris Kipen, Director of Literature at the US National Endowment for the Arts.

== Outline ==
In his 2006 book The Schreiber Theory: A Radical Rewrite of American Film History, Kipen says that the influential 1950s-era auteur theory has wrongly skewed analysis towards a director-centred view of film. In contrast, Kipen believes that the screenwriter has a greater influence on the quality of a finished work and that knowing who wrote a film is "the surest predictor" of how good it will be:

A filmgoer seeking out pictures written by, say, Eric Roth or Charlie Kaufman won't always see a masterpiece, but he'll see fewer clunkers than he would following even a brilliant director like John Boorman, or an intelligent actor like Jeff Goldblum. It's all a matter of betting on the fastest horse, instead of the most highly touted or the prettiest.

Kipen acknowledges that his writer-centred approach is not new, and he pays tribute to earlier critics of auteur theory such as Pauline Kael and Richard Corliss. He believes that the auteurist approach remains dominant, however, and that films have suffered as a result of the screenwriter's role being undervalued. Kipen refers to his book as a "manifesto" and in an interview with the magazine SF360 stated that he wished to use Schreiber theory as "a lever to change the way people think about screenwriting, and movies in general".

== Origin of term ==
In seeking a name for his theory, Kipen chose the Yiddish word for "writer" – "schreiber" – in honor of the many Jewish American screenwriters, many of whom had Yiddish as (at least part of) their mother tongue.

== Criticism ==
Writing in Variety, Diane Garrett said Kipen shows a degree of disingenuousness when he states that Schreiberism is "an attempt to rescue reviewing and scholarship from those who would have us forget just how collaborative filmmaking truly is". She said, "If that's really the goal, why spend 150 pages arguing for the supremacy of the writer? Instead say what you really mean: Don't forget the writer, please".

In an interview with Kipen, film writer Michael Fox said Schreiberism seemed less an attempt to discredit auteur theory outright than a ploy to "simply shift the auteur appellation from directors to screenwriters". Kipen's reply was that there was an element of "parody" in his writer-centred theory, in that he hoped to "overcorrect" the director-centred model in such a way that "the final average of the two is a more realistic representation".
