= David Kipen =

American writer and academic

David Kipen (born August 14, 1963) is an author, critic, broadcaster, arts administrator, full-time UCLA writing faculty member and nonprofit bilingual lending librarian. His fiction and nonfiction have appeared in the San Francisco Chronicle, The New York Times, the Los Angeles Times, Alta Magazine, The Atlantic Monthly, OZY.com and elsewhere. The former literature director of the National Endowment for the Arts, he lives in his native Southern California.

== Print and multimedia journalism ==
Kipen was born in Los Angeles and educated at public schools and Yale. After starting out editing sections for the Los Angeles city magazine Buzz and Variety, Kipen served from 1998 to 2005 as book critic and editor for the San Francisco Chronicle. While there he wrote the magazine essay on screenwriters that became his first book, The Schreiber theory: A Radical Rewrite of American Film History (Melville House). His op-ed "An open letter to Uniontown from Los Angeles" ran as part of the Pittsburgh Post-Gazette's Pulitzer-winning coverage of the 2018 synagogue shooting at the Tree of Life Congregation. Another op-ed, "85 Years Ago, FDR Saved American Writers. Could It Ever Happen Again?" ran in the Los Angeles Times in May 2020 and has helped create a groundswell of support for the revival of the Federal Writers' Project.

Kipen's radio show and podcast Overbooked ran for three years on KCRW-FM. Concurrently, he reviewed books every fortnight for NPR's Day to Day. On television, he has appeared on NBC's Today Show on MSNBC's Countdown with Keith Olbermann. While at the NEA, he served as the film correspondent for The Bob Edwards Show on Sirius XM Radio. In addition, he continues to talk frequently about books and culture on three Southern California public-radio stations, including his recurring segment Reading By Moonlight on KPCC-FM.

== National Endowment for the Arts ==
From 2005 to 2010 Kipen served as Director of Literature and National Reading Initiatives at the National Endowment for the Arts, where he helped develop and manage The Big Read. For over a decade, cities and towns all over America (with excursions to Mexico, Russia and Egypt) have welcomed this initiative to promote reading via One City, One Book-style programs. The Big Read has reached over a thousand municipalities, and enjoys ongoing dedicated funding from Congress. He also pioneered one of the first-ever federal blogs, which continues to this day.

In 2008, NEA chairman Dana Gioia tasked Kipen with fielding a delegation of over fifty Southern California writers and filmmakers to the 2009 Feria Internacional Del Libro (FIL) in Guadalajara, Mexico, the world's second largest book fair. Working with the Los Angeles Department of Cultural Affairs, Kipen spent 18 months planning and executing the literary and film programming of this cultural exploration of Los Angeles. Once there he moderated daily panels, interviews and screenings in both English and Spanish.

== Libros Schmibros ==
Upon his return from Washington to Los Angeles in 2010, Kipen founded Libros Schmibros, a nonprofit bilingual lending library that shares good free books with residents of its Boyle Heights neighborhood and Greater Los Angeles. Under his artistic direction, Libros Schmibros has produced several events and installations throughout Los Angeles, including a ten-week, held-over engagement at the Hammer Museum. Libros Schmibros' cultural contributions to Los Angeles also include a massive Literary Map of Los Angeles, since purchased by UCLA Special Collections for permanent public display.

== Programming ==
Kipen has programmed film retrospectives for both the American Film Festival in Moscow and the Norton Simon Museum, and given talks at film festivals in Thessaloniki, Greece; Utrecht, the Netherlands; and Cheltenham, England.

== Los Angeles ==
Along the way Kipen has assumed a prominent role in the Los Angeles cultural scene. He has worked with the city and county cultural affairs departments and juried several awards. He frequently addresses enthusiasts and students of the city in architectural, historical, and arts convenings. He appears regularly in conversations for the Los Angeles Public Library, Writer's Bloc, and Zócalo Public Square. There and elsewhere, he has engaged a wide range of creative people in interviews—public, published and broadcast—including Steve Martin, David Foster Wallace, John Cleese, Hal Holbrook, Salman Rushdie, Bruce Dern, Jonathan Franzen, Tommy Lee Jones, Forest Whitaker, Christopher Hitchens, Manohla Dargis, and Ray Bradbury.

== Teaching ==
He teaches on UCLA's full-time writing faculty.

== Books ==
Kipen is probably best known for his bestselling 2018 book Dear Los Angeles: The City In Diaries And Letters, 1542–2018 (Modern Library), which Dwight Garner, in his New York Times review, called "ebullient and often moving." He is also the author of The Schreiber Theory: A Radical Rewrite of American Film History (Melville House, 2006). A screenwriter-centric staple of film school syllabi. Lawrence Weschler has written of it, "I loved that book. It's still on my bookshelf and I lend it out occasionally."

Kipen's translation from Spanish into English of Miguel de Cervantes' novella The Dialogue of the Dogs appeared from the same publisher in 2009. In addition, one of his many articles about the author Thomas Pynchon was commissioned for and appears in the book Pynchon in Context (Cambridge University Press). A scholar of the Depression-era Federal Writers' Project, Kipen has also edited and introduced reissues of the WPA Guides to Los Angeles, San Francisco, San Diego, and California (UC PRESS).

== Fiction ==
Kipen has published early precursors to his novel-in-progress, "The Anniversarist," as "Time Turns Around at Musso & Frank" in Alta Magazine, and across five installments in Boom Magazine as "The Americas."
