= Tessa Kelso =

American librarian (1863–1933)

Teresa Kelso
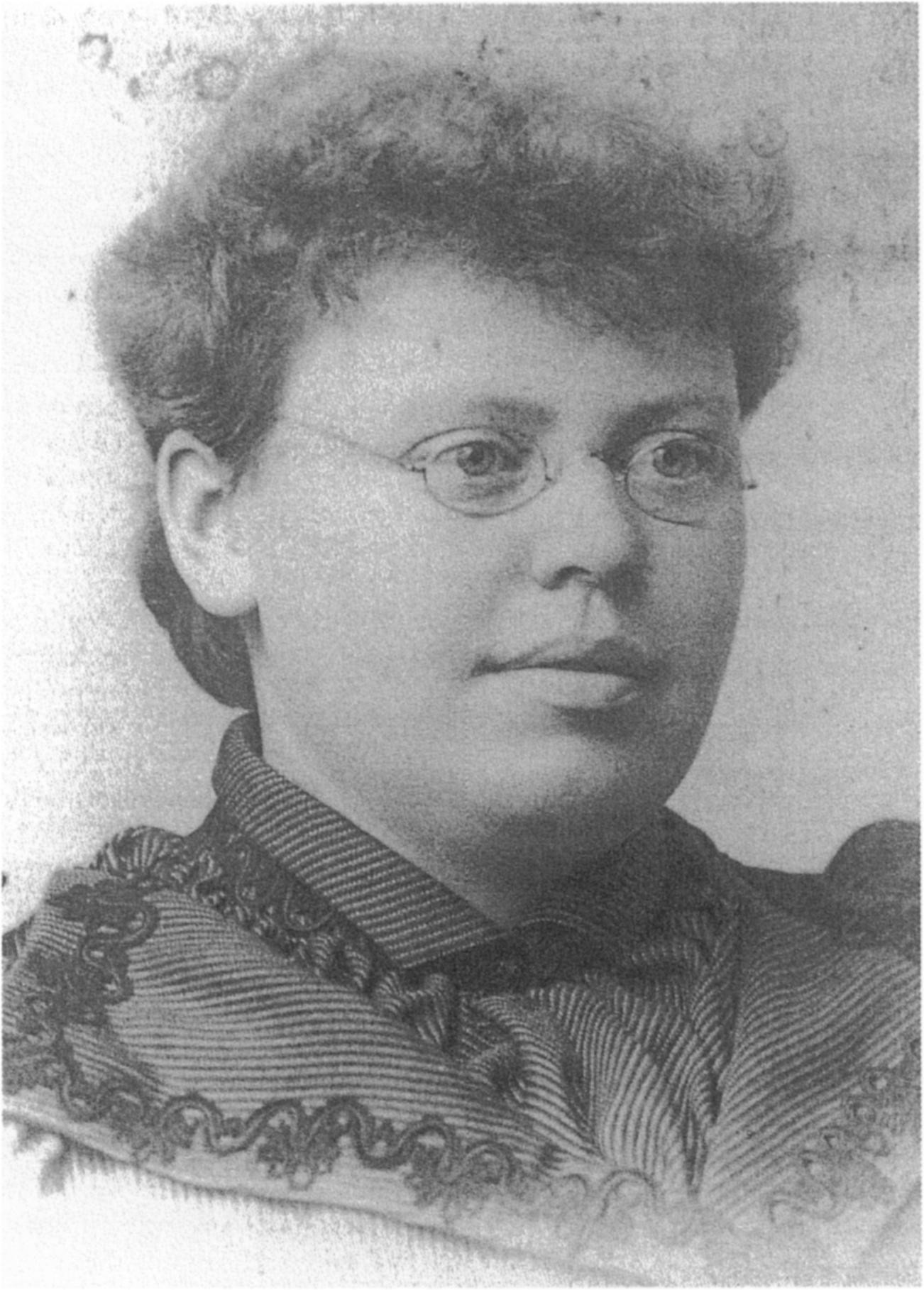
- Teresa Kelso
- Born: Teresa Laura Kelso; May 1, 1863; Dayton, Ohio
- Died: August 14, 1933 (aged 70); Santa Barbara, California
- Occupations: publicist, journalist, and librarian

Teresa Laura "Tessa" Kelso (May 1863 – August 14, 1933) was an American librarian, publicist and journalist who was head librarian of the Los Angeles Public Library. A local Methodist minister accused her of "sin" when the library stocked a book that offended him; she sued him for malicious slander, and the case was settled in her favor, in 1895. The digital collections portal of the Los Angeles Public Library is named "Tessa" after her.

== Early life ==
Teresa Laura Kelso was born in Dayton, Ohio, and lived in Cincinnati, Ohio, the daughter of Ephraim Walter Kelso and Mary Ellen Breisford Kelso. She moved to California in 1886.

== Career ==
Kelso started her working life as a journalist and publicist. She joined the American Library Association (ALA) in 1886, to cover their annual meeting in Milwaukee that year for the Cincinnati Illustrated News. She became an active member of the organization. She was a member of the Pacific Coast Women's Press Association, and attended their annual meeting in 1893. She founded the Association for the Preservations of the Missions in 1888, which is confirmed by the California government via California Legislature Senate Bill No. 987, Section 1:d. SB-987 California Missions, April 22, 2003; her work to save the missions is also mentioned by George Wharton James as "the first serious attempt to preserve the California missions." The Association's mission was taken up by the Landmarks Club with acknowledgment of her previous work, and she stayed on as a member of the organization's advisory board. She was also an officer of the Historical Society of Southern California, serving as its vice president in 1892. In 1893, she became one of the first two women elected to the Los Angeles Chamber of Commerce, alongside Harriet Williams Russell Strong.

With no previous library experience, Tessa Kelso was hired as head librarian of the Los Angeles City Library in 1889. She was the fourth consecutive woman to hold the head librarian role there; Mary Foy was the first. Under Kelso's watch, the library adopted the Dewey Decimal System, and began offering interlibrary loans. She reduced, and later abolished, user fees and extended hours of operation. During her tenure, the library gained its first card catalog. She also started the library on the path to branch locations, with "delivery stations" in outlying neighborhoods. She appointed Adelaide Hasse as assistant librarian, and offered a training class for young women who wanted to be librarians. She attended the World Congress of Librarians in Chicago in 1893, but this was criticized by city newspapers as frivolous, as when the Los Angeles Herald called her "the expensive appendage of an expensive institution".

In 1894, a Methodist minister, Rev. Dr. J. W. Campbell, spoke from the pulpit against Kelso's librarianship, leading prayers for her reformation, because the library added Le Cadet, a novel by Jean Richepin, to its shelves. Kelso, who did not speak French and did not personally choose that title for acquisition, sued Campbell for malicious slander, with Frank H. Howard, president of the Los Angeles Bar Association, as her attorney. The pastor settled the case in early 1895, with his church paying Kelso's legal expenses in recompense.

In April 1895, Kelso offered her resignation to the library's board of trustees. They asked her to withdraw her resignation at the same meeting, recognizing her experience and the lack of similarly qualified replacements on short notice. Her resubmitted resignation was accepted at a later meeting that spring.

After leaving the Los Angeles Public Library, she moved to New York City and worked at the publisher Baker & Taylor, running their library department. She also joined the New York Women's Municipal League, and wrote a weekly column for the New York Evening Post.

In 1924, Kelso objected to the New York Library Association (NYLA) planning to host their annual Library Week and conference at the Lake Placid, NY estate of Melvil Dewey, stating, "For many years women librarians have been the special prey of Mr. Dewey in a series of outrages against decency, having serious and far reaching effects upon his victims..." After interviewing both sides, a cadre of representatives from NYLA, ALA, and the American Library Institute - organizations all founded in part by Dewey - sided with Kelso and relocated the conference to Lake George, NY.

Kelso resigned from the Los Angeles Public Library on May 1, 1895. She died on August 14, 1933, in Santa Barbara, California, aged 70 years.

== Personal life ==
Kelso was striking in appearance, with short hair and glasses, often seen smoking in public, and not wearing a hat, as women generally did at the time. She and Adelaide Hasse worked and lived together from 1892, commuted to the library together on bicycles, and both moved east after they jointly resigned from the library. Hasse and Kelso had also been members of Charles Fletcher Lummis's "Bibliosmiles" librarians' social group together.

== Legacy ==
Kelso was inducted into the California Library Hall of Fame in 2017. The digital collections portal of the Los Angeles Public Library is named "Tessa" for Tessa Kelso.
