= Libros Schmibros =

Lending library in Los Angeles, CA, US

Coordinates: 34.04750°N 118.22002°W

Libros Schmibros is a lending library located in Boyle Heights, Los Angeles, a predominantly Latinx neighborhood. The diversity among the residents means there is great "language diversity within Boyle Heights" as there are many bilingual individuals. Local libraries in the Boyle Heights area started closing on Mondays, and not one of the public libraries offered "bilingual story hours for children". The literary desert forming in Boyle Heights and the lack of access to bilingual media were the founders' of Libros Schmibros, David Kipen and Colleen Jaurretche, primary motivations in creating the lending library.

== History ==
The library was founded by University of California: Los Angeles (UCLA) professors David Kipen and Colleen Jaurretche in 2010. Since its opening, over 20,000 books have been circulated in the community of Boyle Heights among the over 2,000 members of the lending library. with a large collection of bilingual books.

In 2018, the lending library relocated across the street to the "corner of Boyle Avenue and East First Street" and into the historic Boyle Hotel, a landmark for the city of Los Angeles with great significance to Boyle Heights. The hotel was originally a social hub for many residents of Boyle Heights until the building eventually fell into disrepair. The city of Los Angeles declared it a historical landmark which lead to the building's renovation in 2012. The application process for the Boyle Hotel location was competitive, but co-founder Kipen won the property through an essay contest. Libros Schmibros has since been redesigned. In September 2019, the co-founders hired the Rachel Allen Development Architecture Research (RADAR), a local interior design firm, to reorganize and redecorate their new location. The redesign has made the 800 square foot space more colorful and more open. The lending library has been working towards achieving their goal of providing all individuals regardless of background or wealth with books.

== Significance ==
Libros Schmibros' objective is to put "low-or no-cost books into all hands, native and immigrant, Eastside and West". Their mission statement highlights the fact that Libros Schmibros' intention is to bring the community of Boyle Heights regardless of an individual's background, together. The lending library's focus on supplying bilingual books has served community members that speak one language, multiple languages, or even those that do not speak English. Libros Schmibros specifically provides opportunities for children to engage with literature and books. At the lending library, they offer monthly Children's Reading Hour, services that put writers into local classrooms, and activities like Bicycle Libraries in collaboration with The Metabolic Studio, which gives students and children the ability to have libraries on the move with model bikes that have book carriers. Libros Schmibros frequently introduces new programs, services, and activities to keep members of the Boyle Heights community interacting with literature.
