= Los Angeles Public Library =

Public library system in Los Angeles, California

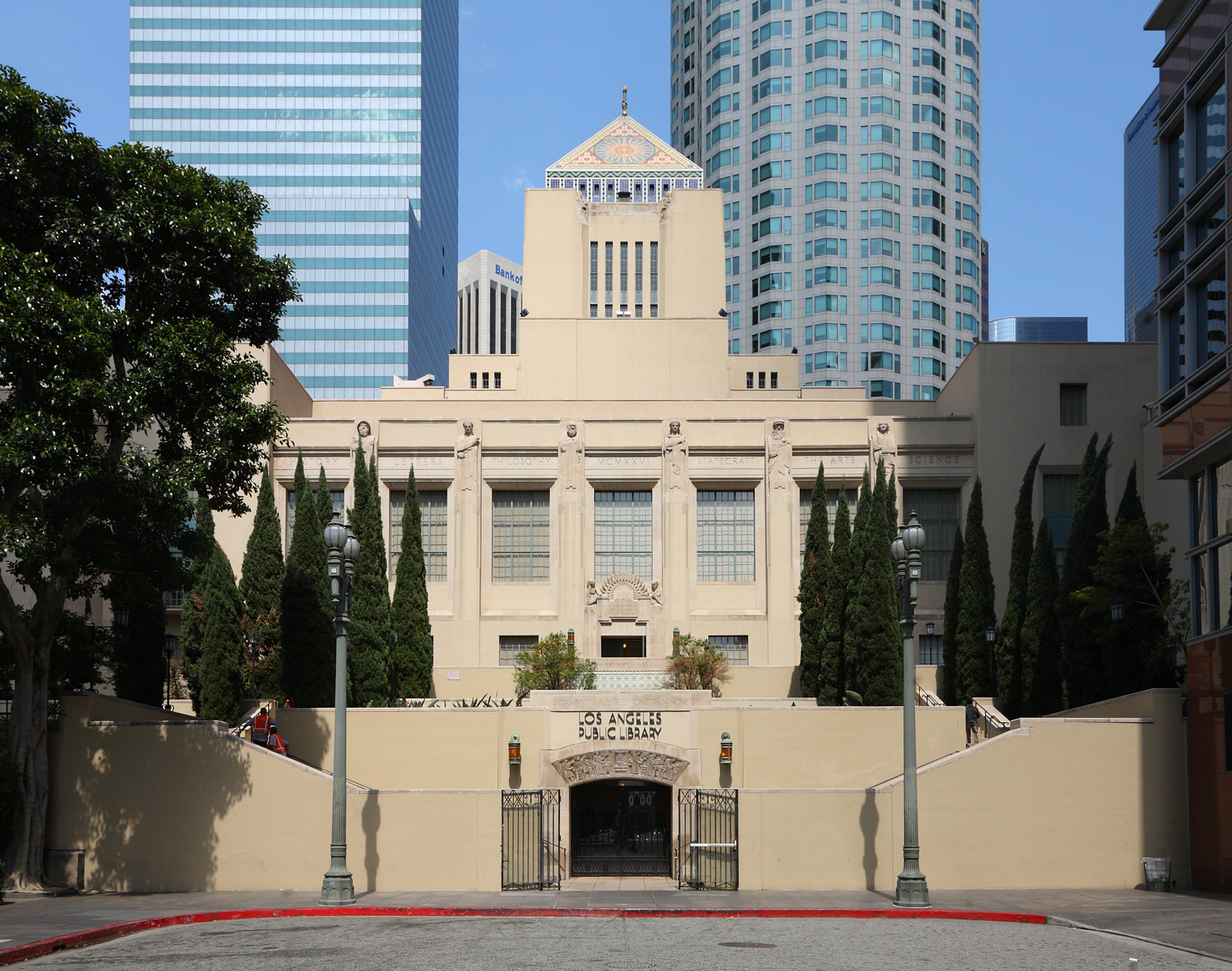
- South entrance of the Richard J. Riordan Central Library at Hope Street
- Location: 630 West 5th Street (Headquarters), Los Angeles, California, United States
- Type: Public
- Established: 1872; 154 years ago
- Branches: 72

Collection
- Size: 6,393,429

Access and use
- Circulation: 18 million (2008)
- Population served: 4,030,904 (city) 18,783,638 (metro)

Other information
- Budget: US$134,630,543
- Director: John F. Szabo (Fall 2012)
- Employees: 944
- Website: lapl.org

The Los Angeles Public Library (LAPL) is a public library system in Los Angeles, California, operating separate from the Los Angeles County Public Library system. The system holds more than six million volumes, and with around 19 million residents in the Greater Los Angeles area, it serves the largest metropolitan population of any public library system in the United States. The system is overseen by a Board of Library Commissioners with five members appointed by the mayor of Los Angeles in staggered terms, and operates 72 library branches throughout the city. In 1997 a local historian described it as "one of the biggest and best-regarded library systems in the nation."

== History ==
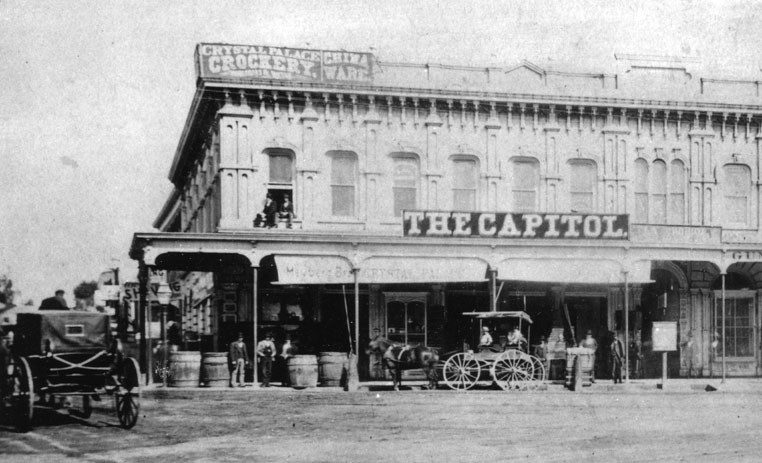
The Downey Block, 1880s

The Los Angeles Library Association was formed in late 1872, and by early 1873, a well-stocked reading room had opened in the Downey Block at Temple and Main streets under the first librarian, John Littlefield.

The original library consisted of two rooms. The larger room was called the "Book Room," and the smaller room was called the "Conversation Room," which contained newspapers, tables, chairs, and spittoons for the chess and checkers players who gathered there.

Women were not initially involved in the conception and development of the Los Angeles Library Association. First Lady of California Maria Downey was given an honorary membership out of "courtesy," but otherwise, no women were listed in the association's founding documents, women were not represented on the board, and women were denied access to the library's reading room. However, this changed in 1876 when the association decided to implement a "Ladies Room." While this new room did not offer any books, it did provide a number of magazines and comfortable sofa and chairs for local clubwomen to use.

After Mary Foy was appointed as the first head woman librarian in 1880, her appointment was viewed as an act of charity by Mayor Toberman, who may have thought Foy to be in need of a job. Joanne Passet even posited that Foy's nomination, and librarian nominations in general, were seen as "an honorable means of assisting needy men and women in the community." This notion was mostly confirmed when Foy was replaced by Jessie Gavitt, whose economic need was deemed greater than Foy's by the board. Following Foy's appointment, the LAPL would go on to be "headed by a series of women administrators" for the next 25 years. These administrators included, Mary E. Foy (1880–1884), Jessie Gavitt (1884–1889), Lydia Prescott (1889), Tessa Kelso (1889–1895), Clara Fowler (1895–1897), Harriet Child Wadleigh (1897–1900), and Mary L. Jones (1900–1905).

There was further speculation as to why the board decided on appointing Foy as the first head woman librarian. It may have been a political choice since she represented values that flourished in women's organizations, aiming to please the city's powerful women's clubs who may have been applying pressure. It's also suggested that Foy's nomination was a financial move; John Littlefield earned a salary of $100 while Mary Foy earned $75, which included janitorial work.

Tessa Kelso was appointed head librarian in 1889. She abolished the membership fee, increased membership from 100 to 20,000, increased the collection from 12,000 to 300,000 volumes, moved the books to open shelves, and permitted children to use the library. She set up an early system of branch libraries and moved the central library in to City Hall. She was forced out after a controversy over the library's acquisition of Jean Richepin's book La Cadet, which was considered indecent at the time.

Mary Jones, who was appointed Librarian in 1905, was fired by the library board in favor of Charles Fletcher Lummis. The only reason given for this was that the library should be run by a man, not a woman. This provoked "The Great Library War". Women in Los Angeles petitioned and marched in support of Jones but she was finally forced out; she took up a position as head of the library at Bryn Mawr College in Pennsylvania. Lummis established several special collections, including photography, autographs, and California and Spanish history. He oversaw two moves into larger buildings, and he greatly increased use of the library through several outreach programs.

c. 1914, the collection numbered 203,600. The central library was located in the "Hamburger Building at Eighth and Broadway" with plans to soon move to the "Metropolitan Building at Fifth and Broadway." The library had 22 branch "reading rooms" including two (San Pedro and Hollywood) housed in Carnegie library buildings. The library had a total of 41 "branches and distribution points" at that time, and cooperated with the "playground department" to offer "branch libraries" at "the Violet Street, Slauson, Hazard, and Echo Park playgrounds, and at the Recreation Center."

Aggressive expansion and growth of the system began in the 1920s. The first building dedicated exclusively for library use opened in 1926.

In 1970, Central Library was added to the National Register of Historic Places. In 1987, twenty-two additional branches built between 1913 and 1930 were added as part of a thematic listing.

On January 8, 2025, the Pacific Palisades Branch Library was destroyed in the 2025 Palisades Fire.

The world's largest pop-up book Luceros y Penumbras was unveiled during the Central Library's centennial celebration on July 11, 2026.

=== City librarians ===
- 1873–1879: John Littlefield
- 1879–1880: Patrick Connolly
- 1880–1884: Mary Foy
- 1884–1889: Jessie Gavitt
- 1889–1889: Lydia Prescott
- 1889–1895: Tessa Kelso
- 1895–1897: Clara Bell Fowler
- 1897–1900: Harriet Child Wadleigh
- 1900–1905: Mary Letitia Jones
- 1905–1910: Charles Fletcher Lummis
- 1910–1911: Purd Wright
- 1911–1933: Everett Robbins Perry
- 1933–1947: Althea Warren
- 1947–1969: Harold Hamill
- 1969–1990: Wyman Jones
- 1990–1994: Elizabeth Martinez
- 1995–2004: Susan Goldberg Kent
- 2004–2008: Fontayne Holmes
- 2009–2012: Martin Gomez
- 2012–present: John Szabo

== Locations ==
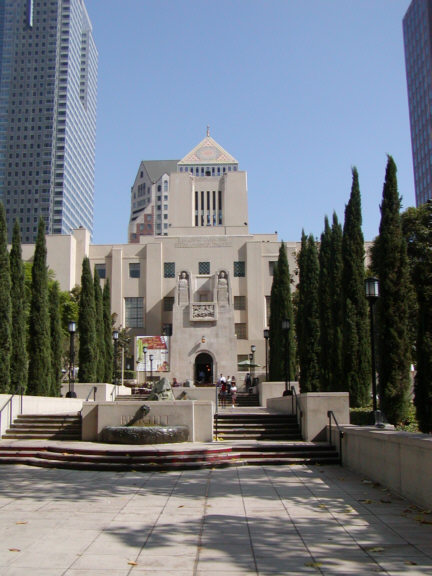
Los Angeles Central Library at Flower Street

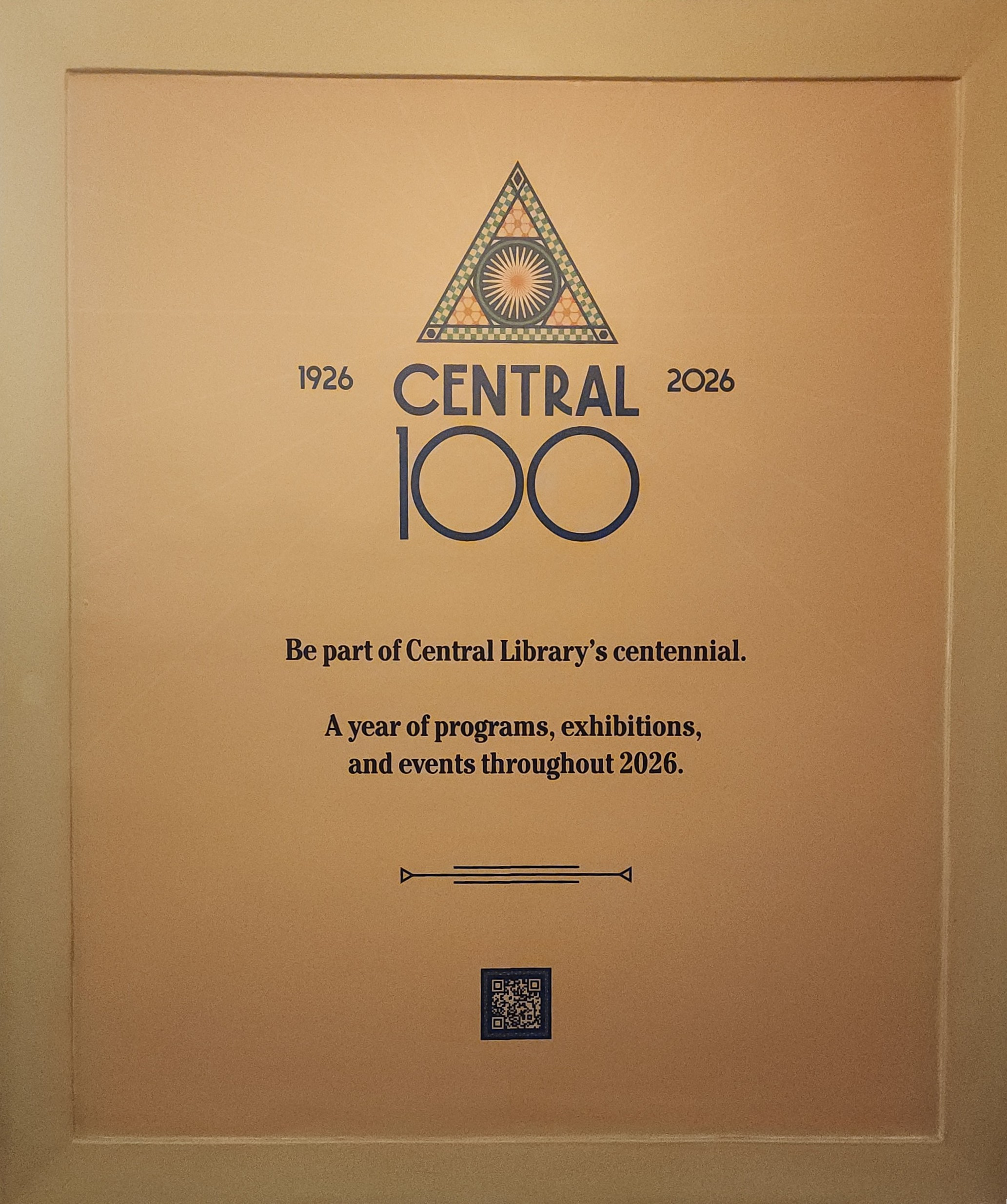
Los Angeles Central Library advertising its centennial in 2026

Central Library was constructed between 1924 and 1926, and first opened its doors to the public on July 6, 1926. It is considered a downtown Los Angeles landmark. It was designed by architect Bertram Goodhue. This would be Goodhue' last work before he died suddenly of a heart attack on April 24, 1924. The Richard Riordan Central Library complex is the third largest public library in the United States in terms of book and periodical holdings. Originally named the Central Library, the building was first renamed in honor of the longtime president of the Board of Library Commissioners and President of the University of Southern California, Rufus B. von KleinSmid. The new wing of Central Library, completed in 1993, was named in honor of former mayor Tom Bradley. The complex (i.e., the original Goodhue building and the Bradley wing) was subsequently renamed in 2001 for former Los Angeles Mayor Richard Riordan, as the Richard Riordan Central Library. The building was burned out by a catastrophic fire in 1986 when a million books and many other records (patents, play scripts, photographs) were damaged or totally destroyed. Arson was suspected but never proved.

In addition to Central Library, the Los Angeles Public Library system also operates 72 branch locations throughout the city. Eight of these are designated regional branches.

== Programs and services ==
TESSA is Los Angeles Public Library's digital portal for its historical collections, providing online access to thousands of photographs, maps, documents, and other archival materials related to the history and culture of Southern California. The platform is named after Tessa Kelso, the sixth Los Angeles City Librarian from 1889 to 1895, who was noted for her advocacy of open access and expanding library services.

In June 2019, the Los Angeles Public Library opened the Octavia Lab, located at Central Library. Named in honor of science fiction author Octavia E. Butler, the lab is a makerspace and audiovisual studio that provides free access to creative tools and technology for library cardholders. Available equipment includes 3D printers, a laser cutter, sewing machines, green screen video production tools, and digitization stations for preserving analog media such as VHS tapes, cassettes, and slides.

The library has also issued limited-edition library cards highlighting local culture and the arts. In 2016, it released a card featuring artwork by Shepard Fairey and Cleon Peterson. In 2019, artist Gajin Fujita created a Kintaro design fitted in Dodger gear as part of the library's second limited-edition card release. In 2023, a card was issued featuring the mountain lion P-22 in a National Geographic photo with the Hollywood Sign in the background.

The library offers an online program that allows adult patrons who have not completed high school to earn their high school diploma.

== Awards ==
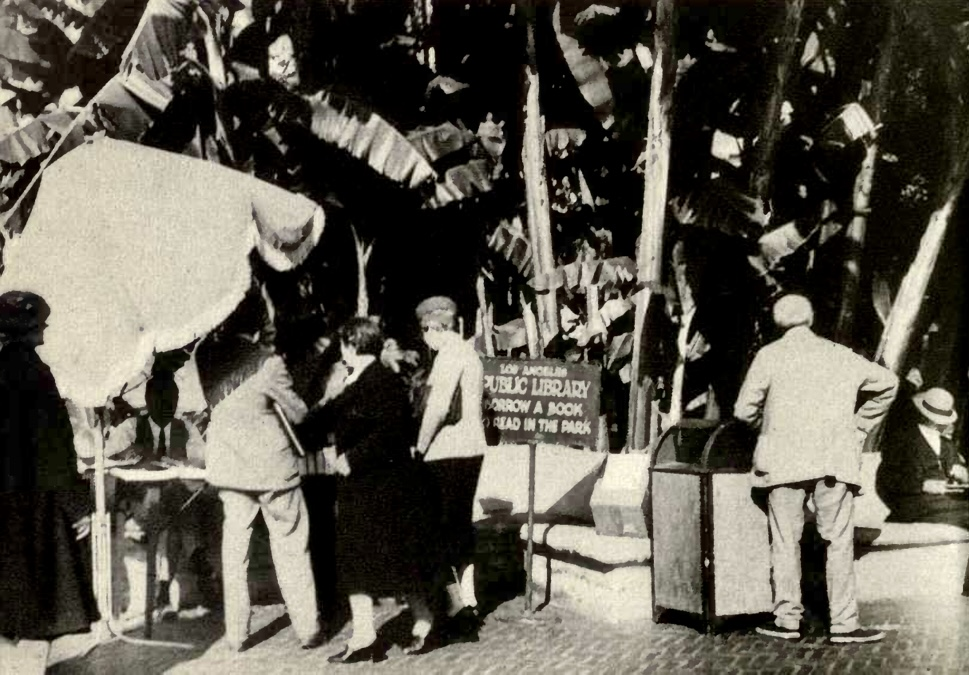
"Parasol Library in Pershing Square" c. 1938, photographed for the Federal Writers' Project

The Los Angeles Public Library received the National Medal for Museum and Library Service, the nation's highest honor given to museums and libraries for service to the community. City Librarian John F. Szabo and community member Sergio Sanchez accepted the award on behalf of the library from First Lady Michelle Obama during a White House Ceremony on May 20, 2015.

The Los Angeles Public Library was selected for its success in meeting the needs of Angelenos and providing a level of social, educational, and cultural services unmatched by any other public institution in the city. The award recognizes the library's programs that help people on their path to citizenship, earn their high school diploma, manage personal finances and access health and well-being services and resources.

== See also ==
- National Register of Historic Places listings in Los Angeles
- Samuel Bradford Caswell (1828–1898), one of the first trustees of the first Los Angeles public library, owned property where the Central Branch was built
- Donald D. Lorenzen, City Council member who supported renovation of library
- Althea Warren, head librarian, 1943–1947
- Leontyne Butler King, first black member of the Los Angeles Library Commission (appointed 1961)
- Victorian Downtown Los Angeles
