= Murder House =

Murder House or The Murder House may refer to:

== Fiction ==
=== Books ===
- The Murder House, by Alice Muriel Williamson
- The Murder House, by James Patterson
- The Murder House Trilogy, by Franklin W Dixon
  - Murder House (The Hardy Boys), final book of the trilogy

=== Film and TV ===
- American Horror Story: Murder House
  - "Murder House" (American Horror Story)

=== Games ===
- Murder House (video game)

== Places ==
- "Murder House", a villa outside the walls of Housesteads Roman Fort, where two skeletons were found beneath an apparently newly-laid floor when excavated
- Rosenheim Mansion, a historic building in Los Angeles
