= List of Los Angeles Public Library branch locations =

Branch locations in the Los Angeles Public Library system

The Los Angeles Public Library consists of a central location located downtown and 72 branches throughout Los Angeles. These branches are:

| No. | Name | Photograph | Address | Zip Code | Phone | Area | Neighborhood Served | Notes |
|---|---|---|---|---|---|---|---|---|
| | Benjamin Franklin | | 2200 E. First St. | 90033-3902 | 323-263-6901 | Northeast | Boyle Heights | Closed August 2, 2025. Reopening in 2027. |
| | Lincoln Heights | | 2530 Workman St. | 90031-2322 | 323-226-1692 | Northeast | Lincoln Heights | |
| | Pio Pico - Koreatown (피오 피코 코리아타운 도서관) | | 694 S. Oxford Ave. | 90005-2872 | 213-368-7647 | Hollywood | Koreatown | |
| | Vernon - Leon H. Washington Jr. Memorial | | 4504 S. Central Ave. | 90011-3632 | 323-234-9106 | Central Southern | South Central | |
| | Arroyo Seco Regional | | 6145 N. Figueroa St. | 90042-3565 | 323-255-0537 | Northeast | Highland Park/Garvanza | Regional Branch |
| | Exposition Park - Dr. Mary McLeod Bethune Regional | | 3900 S. Western Ave. | 90062-1111 | 323-290-3113 | Central Southern | Exposition Park | Regional Branch |
| | Junipero Serra | | 4607 S. Main St. | 90037-2735 | 323-234-1685 | Central Southern | South Park | |
| | Echo Park | | 1410 W. Temple St. | 90026-5605 | 213-250-7808 | Northeast | Echo Park | |
| | San Pedro Regional | | 931 S. Gaffey St. | 90731-3606 | 310-548-7779 | Central Southern | San Pedro | Regional Branch |
| | Wilmington | | 1300 N. Avalon Blvd. | 90744-2639 | 310-834-1082 | Central Southern | Wilmington | |
| | Frances Howard Goldwyn - Hollywood Regional | | 1623 Ivar Ave. | 90028-6304 | 323-856-8260 | Hollywood | Hollywood | Regional Branch |
| | John C. Fremont | | 6121 Melrose Ave. | 90038-3501 | 323-962-3521 | Hollywood | Hancock Park | |
| | Westchester-Loyola Village | | 7114 W. Manchester Ave. | 90045-3509 | 310-348-1096 | Western | Westchester | |
| | Vermont Square | | 1201 W. 48th St. | 90037-2838 | 323-290-7405 | Central Southern | Vermont Square | |
| | Palisades | | 861 Alma Real Dr. | 90272-3730 | 310-459-2754 | Western | Pacific Palisades | Destroyed by the 2025 Palisades Fire. Temporary branch in library parking lot opened January 31, 2026. |
| | Donald Bruce Kaufman - Brentwood | | 11820 San Vicente Blvd. | 90049-5002 | 310-575-8273 | Western | Brentwood | |
| | Jefferson-Vassie D. Wright | | 2211 W. Jefferson Blvd. | 90018-3741 | 323-734-8573 | Central Southern | Jefferson Park | |
| | Malabar | | 2801 Wabash Ave. | 90033-2604 | 323-263-1497 | Northeast | Boyle Heights | |
| | Robert Louis Stevenson | | 803 Spence St. | 90023-1727 | 323-268-4710 | Northeast | Boyle Heights | |
| | Cahuenga | | 4591 Santa Monica Blvd. | 90029-1937 | 323-664-6418 | Hollywood | East Hollywood | |
| | El Sereno | | 5226 S. Huntington Dr. | 90032-1704 | 323-225-9201 | Northeast | El Sereno | |
| | Palms - Rancho Park | | 2920 Overland Ave. | 90064-4220 | 323-840-2142 | Western | Palms & Rancho Park | |
| | Van Nuys | | 6250 Sylmar Ave. | 91401-2707 | 818-756-8453 | East Valley | Van Nuys | |
| | Canoga Park | | 20939 Sherman Way | 91303-1744 | 818-887-0320 | West Valley | Canoga Park | |
| | Studio City | | 12511 Moorpark St. | 91604-1372 | 818-755-7873 | East Valley | Studio City | |
| | Angeles Mesa | | 2700 W. 52nd St. | 90043-1953 | 323-292-4328 | Central Southern | Hyde Park/Leimert Park | |
| | West Los Angeles Regional | | 11360 Santa Monica Blvd. | 90025-3152 | 310-575-8323 | Western | West Los Angeles | Regional Branch |
| | Cypress Park | | 1150 Cypress Ave. | 90065-1144 | 323-224-0039 | Northeast | Cypress Park | |
| | Wilshire | | 149 N. St. Andrews Pl. | 90004-4019 | 323-957-4550 | Hollywood | Mid-Wilshire | |
| | Ascot | | 120 W. Florence Ave. | 90003-1805 | 323-759-4817 | Central Southern | Florence | |
| | Will & Ariel Durant | | 7140 W. Sunset Blvd. | 90046-4416 | 323-876-2741 | Hollywood | Hollywood | |
| | Eagle Rock | | 5027 Caspar Ave. | 90041-1901 | 323-258-8078 | Northeast | Eagle Rock | Article on the former building |
| | Hyde Park Miriam Matthews | | 2205 W. Florence Ave. | 90043-5101 | 323-750-7241 | Western | Hyde Park | |
| | John Muir | | 1005 W. 64th St. | 90044-3605 | 323-789-4800 | Central Southern | Vermont-Slauson | |
| | Sunland - Tujunga | | 7771 Foothill Blvd. | 91042-2137 | 818-352-4481 | East Valley | Sunland & Tujunga | |
| | Los Feliz | | 1874 Hillhurst Ave. | 90027-4427 | 323-913-4710 | Hollywood | Los Feliz | |
| | North Hollywood Amelia Earhart Regional | | 5211 Tujunga Ave. | 91601-3119 | 818-766-7185 | East Valley | North Hollywood | Regional Branch |
| | Mar Vista | | 12006 Venice Blvd. | 90066-3810 | 310-390-3454 | Western | Mar Vista | |
| | Panorama City | | 14345 Roscoe Blvd. | 91402-4222 | 818-894-4071 | East Valley | Panorama City | |
| | Venice - Abbot Kinney Memorial | | 501 S. Venice Blvd. | 90291-4201 | 310-821-1769 | Western | Venice | |
| | Washington Irving | | 4117 W. Washington Blvd. | 90018-1053 | 323-734-6303 | Hollywood | Arlington Heights/Mid-City | |
| | Robertson Branch Library | | 1719 S. Robertson Blvd. | 90035-4315 | 310-840-2147 | Western | Beverlywood/Cheviot Hills/Pico-Robertson | Closed Saturday and open Sunday due to widespread observation of Shabbat in this neighborhood |
| | Alma Reaves Woods - Watts | | 10205 Compton Ave. | 90002-2804 | 323-789-2850 | Central Southern | Watts | |
| | Atwater Village | | 3379 Glendale Blvd. | 90039-1825 | 323-664-1353 | Hollywood | Atwater Village | |
| | Mark Twain | | 9621 S. Figueroa St. | 90003-3928 | 323-755-4088 | Central Southern | Vermont Vista | |
| | Baldwin Hills | | 2906 S. La Brea Ave. | 90016-3902 | 323-733-1196 | Western | Baldwin Hills | |
| | Encino - Tarzana | | 18231 Ventura Blvd. | 91356-3630 | 818-343-1983 | West Valley | Encino & Tarzana | |
| | Felipe de Neve | | 2820 W. 6th St. | 90057-3114 | 213-384-7676 | Hollywood | Westlake | |
| | Memorial | | 4625 W. Olympic | 90019-1832 | 323-938-2732 | Hollywood | Country Club Park | |
| | West Valley | | 19036 Vanowen St. | 91335-5114 | 818-345-9806 | West Valley | Reseda | Regional Branch |
| | Sherman Oaks Martin Pollard | | 14245 Moorpark St. | 91423-2722 | 818-205-9716 | East Valley | Sherman Oaks | |
| | Sun Valley | | 7935 Vineland Ave. | 91352-4477 | 818-764-1338 | East Valley | Sun Valley | |
| | Pacoima | | 13605 Van Nuys Blvd. | 91331-3613 | 818-899-5203 | East Valley | Pacoima | |
| | Sylmar | | 14561 Polk St. | 91342-4055 | 818-367-6102 | East Valley | Sylmar | |
| | Playa Vista | | 6400 Playa Vista Dr. | 90094-2168 | 310-437-6680 | Western | Playa Vista | |
| | Granada Hills | | 10640 Petit Ave. | 91344-6452 | 818-368-5687 | West Valley | Granada Hills | |
| | Valley Plaza | | 12311 Vanowen St. | 91605-5624 | 818-765-9251 | East Valley | Valley Glen/North Hollywood | Formerly known as Vanowen Park Branch |
| | Woodland Hills | | 22200 Ventura Blvd. | 91364-1517 | 818-226-0017 | West Valley | Woodland Hills | |
| | Northridge | | 9051 Darby Ave. | 91325-2743 | 818-886-3640 | West Valley | Northridge | |
| | Chatsworth | | 21052 Devonshire St. | 91311-2314 | 818-341-4276 | West Valley | Chatsworth | |
| | Fairfax | | 161 S. Gardner St. | 90036-2717 | 323-936-6191 | Hollywood | Fairfax | |
| | Lake View Terrace | | 12002 Osborne St. | 91342-7221 | 818-890-7404 | East Valley | Lake View Terrace | |
| | Chinatown | | 639 N. Hill St. | 90012-2317 | 213-620-0925 | Northeast | Chinatown | |
| | Little Tokyo | | 203 S. Los Angeles St. | 90012-3704 | 213-612-0525 | Northeast | Little Tokyo | Special collection: Japanese language and arts |
| | Platt | | 23600 Victory Blvd. | 91367-1349 | 818-340-9386 | West Valley | West Hills | |
| | Mid-Valley Regional | | 16244 Nordhoff St. | 91343-3806 | 818-895-3650 | West Valley | North Hills | Regional Branch |
| | Porter Ranch | | 11371 Tampa Ave. | 91326-1729 | 818-360-5706 | West Valley | Porter Ranch | |
| | Harbor City - Harbor Gateway | | 24000 S. Western Ave. | 90710-1741 | 310-534-9520 | Central Southern | Harbor City & Harbor Gateway | |
| | Edendale | | 2011 W. Sunset Blvd. | 90026-3122 | 213-207-3000 | Northeast | Echo Park | |
| | Pico Union | | 1030 S. Alvarado St. | 90006-3712 | 213-368-7545 | Hollywood | Pico-Union | |
| | Westwood | | 1246 Glendon Ave. | 90024-4914 | 310-474-1739 | Western | Westwood | |
| | Silver Lake | | 2411 Glendale Blvd. | 90039-3217 | 323-913-7451 | Northeast | Silver Lake | |
