= House arrest (disambiguation) =

House arrest is the legal confinement of a person to his or her place of residence.

House arrest may also refer to:

- Grounding (discipline technique)

== Film and television ==
- House Arrest (1996 film), an American comedy directed by Harry Winer
- House Arrest (2019 film), an Indian comedy directed by Shashanka Ghosh and Samit Basu
- House Arrest (2021 film), a Russian film
- House Arrest (TV series), a 2011–2013 Bulgarian sitcom
- "House Arrest" (M*A*S*H), a television episode
- "House Arrest" (The Sopranos), a television episode
- House Arrest with Andy Dick, a 2009 web series by Andy Dick
- The House Arrest of Us, a 2020–2021 web series by Richard Arellano

== Literature ==
- House Arrest, a 2000 play by Anna Deavere Smith
- House Arrest, a 2008 Hardy Boys novel in the Murder House Trilogy

== Music ==
- House Arrest (album) or the title song, by Ariel Pink, 2002
- "House Arrest" (song), by Krush, 1987
- "House Arrest", a song by Bryan Adams from Waking Up the Neighbours, 1991
- "House Arrest", a song by Sofi Tukker and Gorgon City, 2020
