= Angelus Vista, Los Angeles =

- Neighborhood
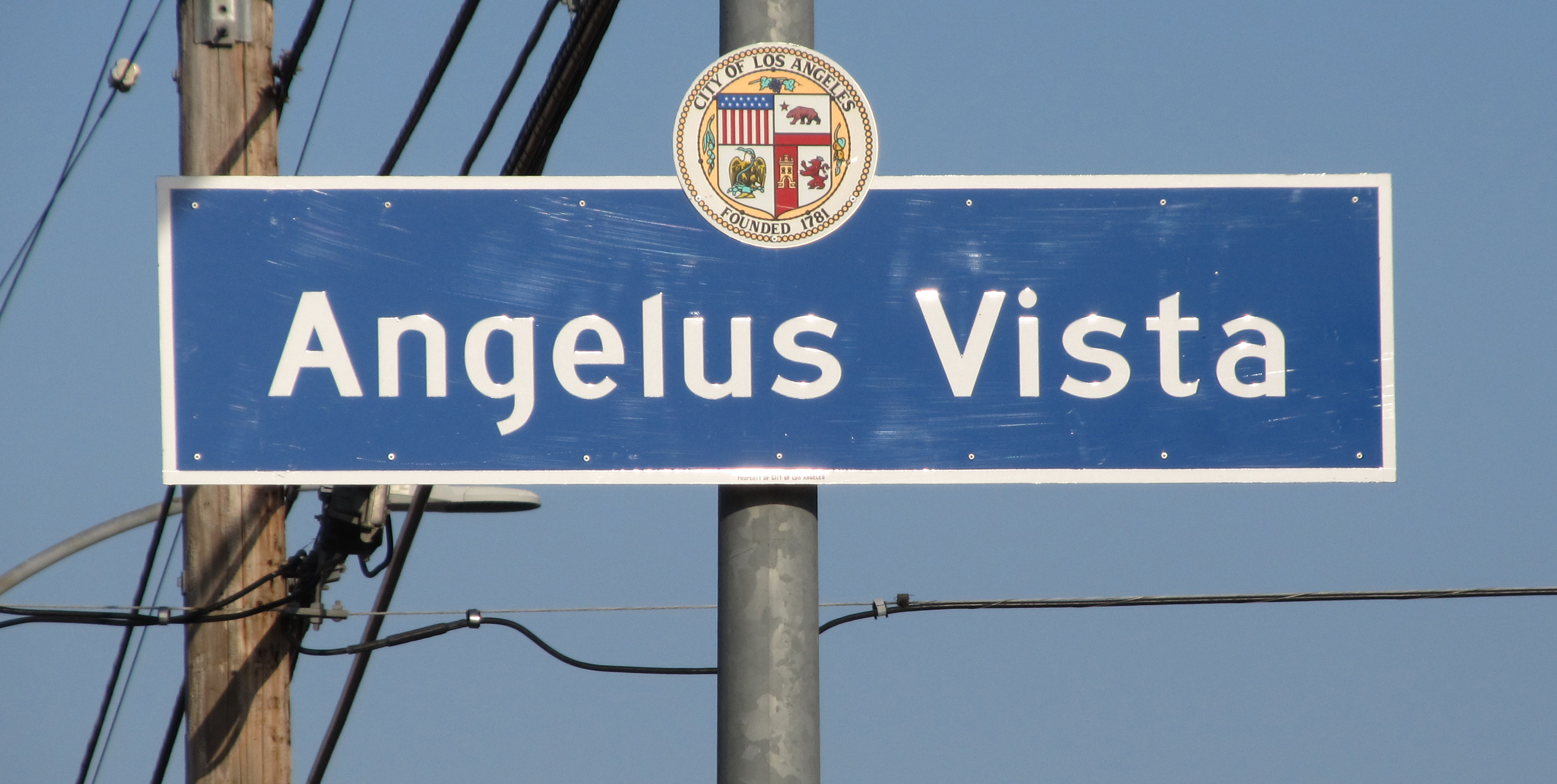
- Angelus Vista neighborhood sign at Pico Boulevard and Arlington Avenue

- Location within Central Los Angeles
- Coordinates: 34.046954°N 118.3174880°W
- Country: United States
- State: California
- County: Los Angeles
- Time zone: Pacific
- Zip Code: 90019
- Area code: 323

Angelus Vista is a neighborhood in Los Angeles, California. There is one Los Angeles Historic-Cultural Monument in neighborhood.

== Geography ==
Angelus Vista is bounded by Pico Boulevard on the north, Western Avenue on the east, Washington Boulevard on the south and Arlington Avenue on the west.

The City of Los Angeles has installed neighborhood signs identify the geographic boundaries of the neighborhood. Neighborhood signs are located at the corners of Pico and Arlington, Washington and Arlington, Pico and Western and Washington and Western.

Arlington Heights is to the west. Harvard Heights and West Adams Heights are located to the east. West Adams Terrace is to the south. Country Club Park is located north of Pico Boulevard.

== History ==
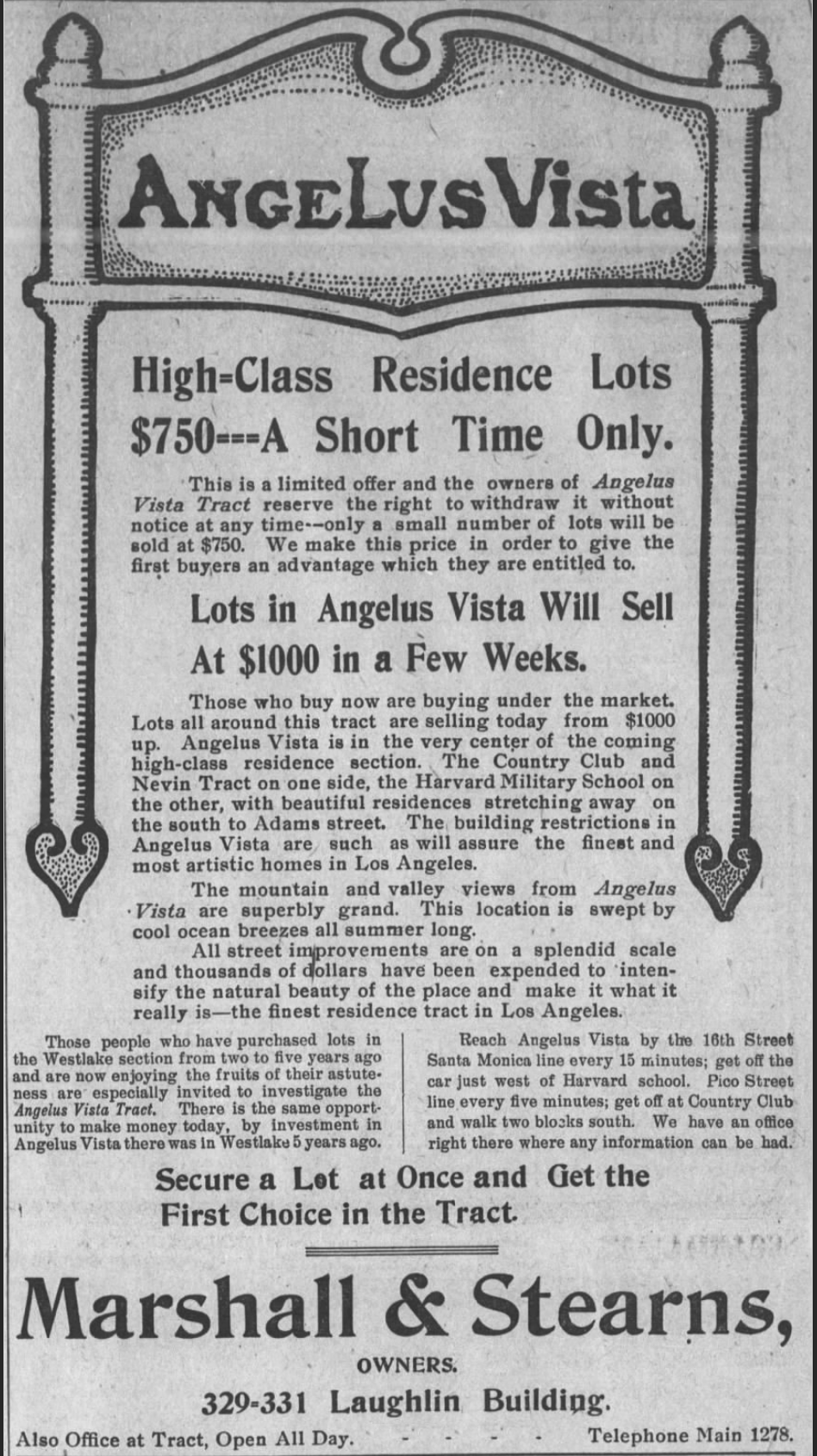
Angelus Vista, 1902

The Angelus Vista tract was subdivided between 1902 and 1904. Building restrictions required all homes to cost a minimum of $2,000, Wide streets were paved throughout the area as part of the initial subdivision. Advertisements described Angelus Vista as part of an up-and-coming section of the city with excellent views of the mountains to the north. Nearby amenities mentioned in early advertisements included the Los Angeles Country Club to the north and Harvard Military College, a private boys' school to the east. Historically, the Angelus Vista area was serviced by two streetcar lines: the 16th Street Santa Monica Electric Car along what is now Venice Blvd and the Pico Streetcar line.

In 1903, the Los Angeles Times ran a story boasting that many of the dwellings in new housing tracts were fine specimens of architectural work. An Angelus Vista home, located on St. Andrews Street was featured. The house was heated by hot air, lighted by gas and electricity, and estimated to have cost $8,500.

In 2018, a neighborhood property located at 1848 South Gramercy Place was nominated as a Los Angeles Historic-Cultural Monument. The West Adams Heritage Association asked members to write letters in support of the designation. The Cultural Heritage Commission site inspection determined that there had been a number significant of alterations. The commission determined that even though the subject property does date from the early period of the neighborhood’s development, it no longer retains sufficient integrity to individually convey its significance. The application was denied.

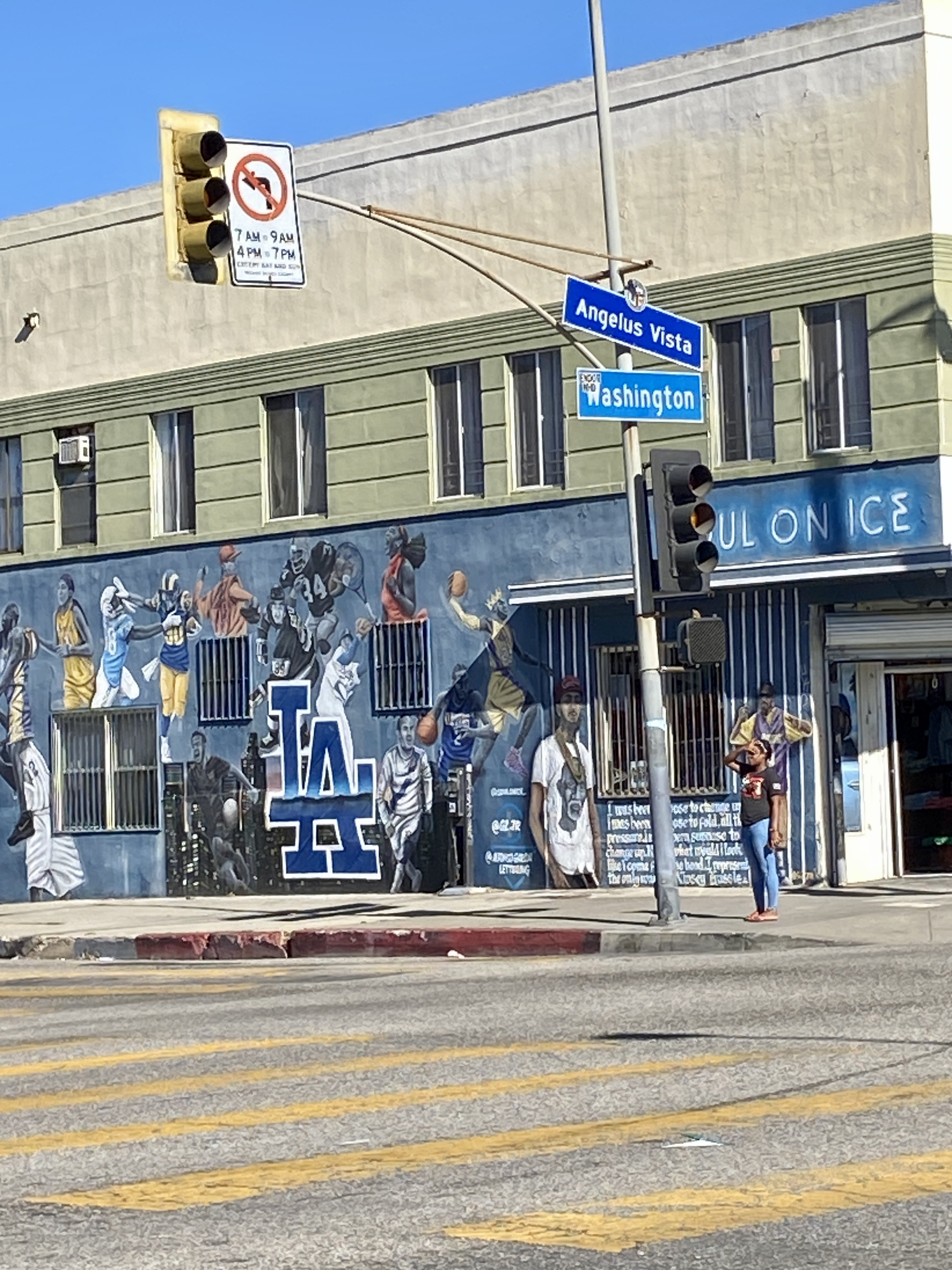
Angelus Vista neighborhood sign and mural at Arlington and Washington

== Angelus Vista Historic District ==
Within Angelus Vista is the Angelus Vista Historic District. It comprises 89 buildings on three blocks including Van Ness Avenue, Cimarron Street, and Wilton Place between Venice and Washington Boulevards. The irregularly-shaped district also includes the block of Van Ness Avenue between Venice and Pico Boulevard and five properties on Gramercy Place. The district is an example of a residential neighborhood comprising Craftsman and Period Revival-style single-family and multi-family homes representing the period of development associated with streetcar suburbanization.

== Los Angeles Historic-Cultural Monuments ==
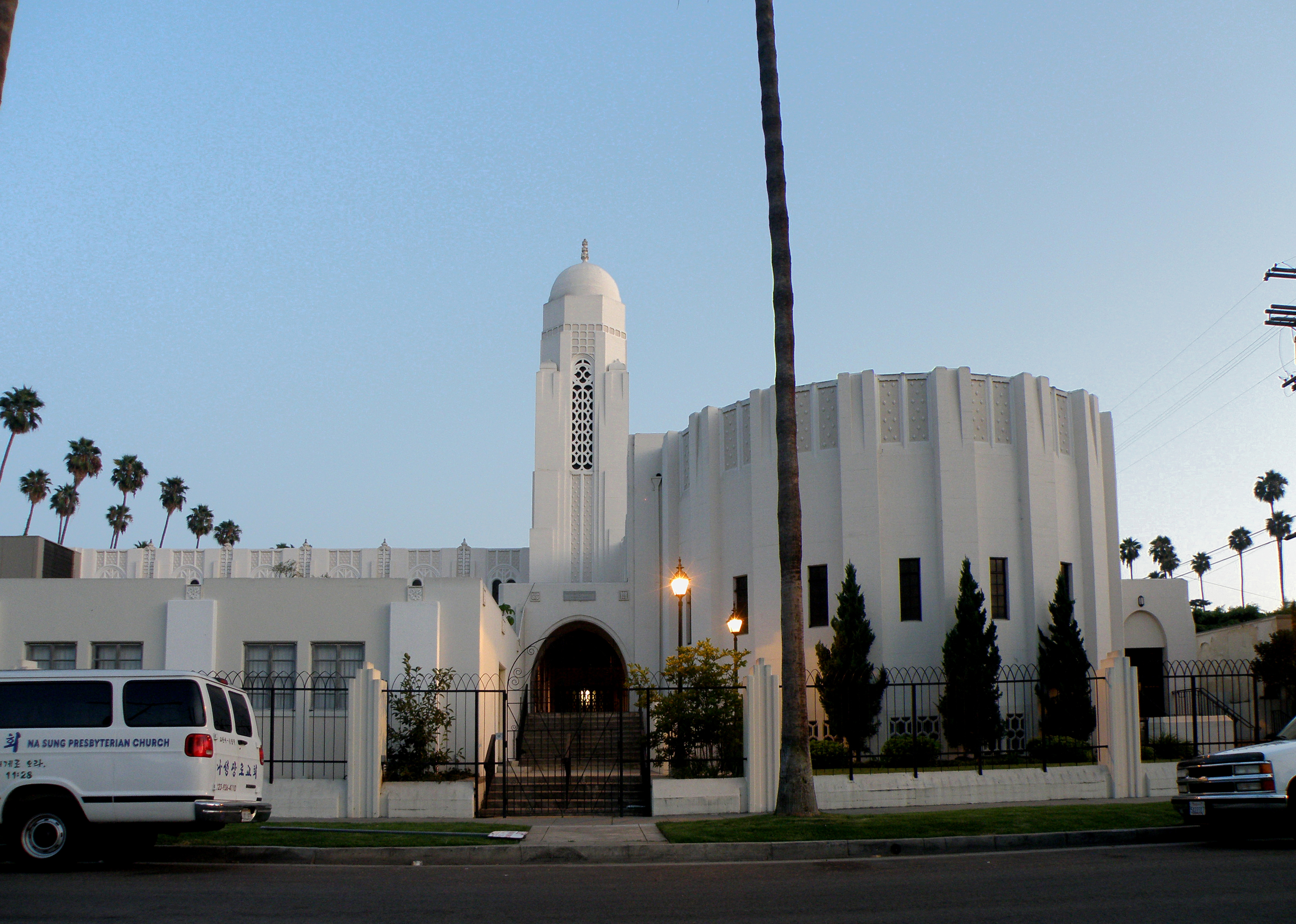
Wilshire Ward Chapel, 2013

There is one Los Angeles Historic-Cultural Monument in Angelus Vista:

- Wilshire Ward Chapel - Located at 1209 S. Manhattan Place, it became Los Angeles Historic-Cultural Monument #531 on May 10, 1991.

== Government ==
Angulus Vista is served by the United Neighborhoods Neighborhood Council. Arlington Heights, along with Angelus Vista, form Region 1.

== Education ==
- Pio Pico Middle School, LAUSD, 1512 South Arlington Avenue
