= Pilot (American Horror Story) =

- American Horror Story episode
- Twins Brian and Troy planning to enter the Murder House
- Episode no.: Season 1 Episode 1
- Directed by: Ryan Murphy
- Written by: Ryan Murphy; Brad Falchuk
- Production code: 1ATS79
- Original air date: October 5, 2011
- Running time: 51 minutes

Guest appearances
- Frances Conroy as Moira O'Hara; Alexandra Breckenridge as Young Moira; Christine Estabrook as Marcy; Jamie Brewer as Adelaide Langdon; Shelby Young as Leah; Andy Umberger as Dr. Day; Bianca Lawson as Abby; Christian Serratos as Becca

Episode chronology
← Previous —	Next → "Home Invasion"
- American Horror Story: Murder House

"Pilot" is the first episode and the series premiere of the television series American Horror Story, which premiered on the network FX on October 5, 2011. The episode was co-written by series creators Ryan Murphy and Brad Falchuk and directed by Murphy. Falchuk and Murphy had previously collaborated on the Fox musical comedy-drama Glee.

In this episode, the Harmon family – Ben (Dylan McDermott), Vivien (Connie Britton) and Violet (Taissa Farmiga) – move from Boston to Los Angeles after Vivien gives birth to a stillborn baby and Ben has an affair with one of his students. The family moves to a restored mansion, unaware that the home is haunted. While Vivien tries to deal with intrusive neighbor Constance (Jessica Lange), Violet connects with troubled teenager Tate (Evan Peters).

In the United States, the series premiere achieved a viewership of 3.18 million. The episode garnered a 1.6 rating in the 18–49 demographic, translating to 2.0 million viewers according to Nielsen Media Research. This made the episode the network's best series premiere ever. Critical reviews of the pilot episode were mostly positive, with Metacritic awarding it 62 out of 100 points. Pilot was nominated for a Primetime Emmy Award for Outstanding Art Direction for a Miniseries or Movie in 2012.

This episode makes use of the musical score to Vertigo composed by Bernard Herrmann. This episode is rated TV-MA (LSV).

== Plot ==
In 1978, twins Bryan and Troy arrive and enter an old mansion, despite a young Adelaide warning them they would die. The boys threaten her and proceed into the house anyway. They vandalize the house a bit with baseball bats before entering the basement where they are killed.

In 2011, Vivien and Ben Harmon move to Los Angeles from Boston, after Vivien has a miscarriage and walks in on Ben having sex with one of his students. Their teenage daughter Violet is unhappy about the move. They come across the mansion and the real estate agent Marcy mentions the previous owners, a gay couple, died from an apparent murder-suicide. The family decides to buy the house and move in. In the attic, they discover a latex bondage suit, which presumably belonged to the previous owners.

Vivien meets next door neighbor Constance and her daughter Adelaide who has Down syndrome. Vivien also re-hires the elderly maid Moira O'Hara who appears to be a young, seductive maid to Ben. The same night, Ben argues with Vivien, trying to apologize for his infidelity. Afterwards the two have sex.

On her first day of school, Violet is harassed by Leah and her friends, who later fight Violet. Ben begins therapy sessions with a possibly psychotic boy named Tate, who begins a relationship with Violet. To help Violet with her bullying problem, he suggests scaring Leah in the house. Ben finds Moira masturbating and he does the same thing. Ben then sees a burnt and disfigured man watching him from outside. When he goes to confront him, he is nowhere to be found.

Meanwhile, Violet tricks Leah into the basement by saying she has drugs, only to find Tate there. He and the creature that killed the twins in 1978 attack Leah, leaving the girl traumatized. Violet, terrified of Tate, tells him to leave. Later that night, a man wearing the gimp suit enters Vivien's bedroom and has sex with Vivien, with Vivien assuming him to be Ben. Downstairs a sleepwalking Ben is drawn to the stove and tries to burn his hand, but Constance stops him.

The next day, Ben sees the man from the previous day, who introduces himself as Larry Harvey. Larry tells Ben that he killed his family by setting them on fire, and warns him that if his family doesn't leave the house, they will die. Ben declines and tells him to stay away from him and his family. Vivien later tells Ben that she's pregnant. Ben hugs Vivien after hearing the news, waiting to finally start over again as a happy family.

== Production ==
=== Conception and development history ===
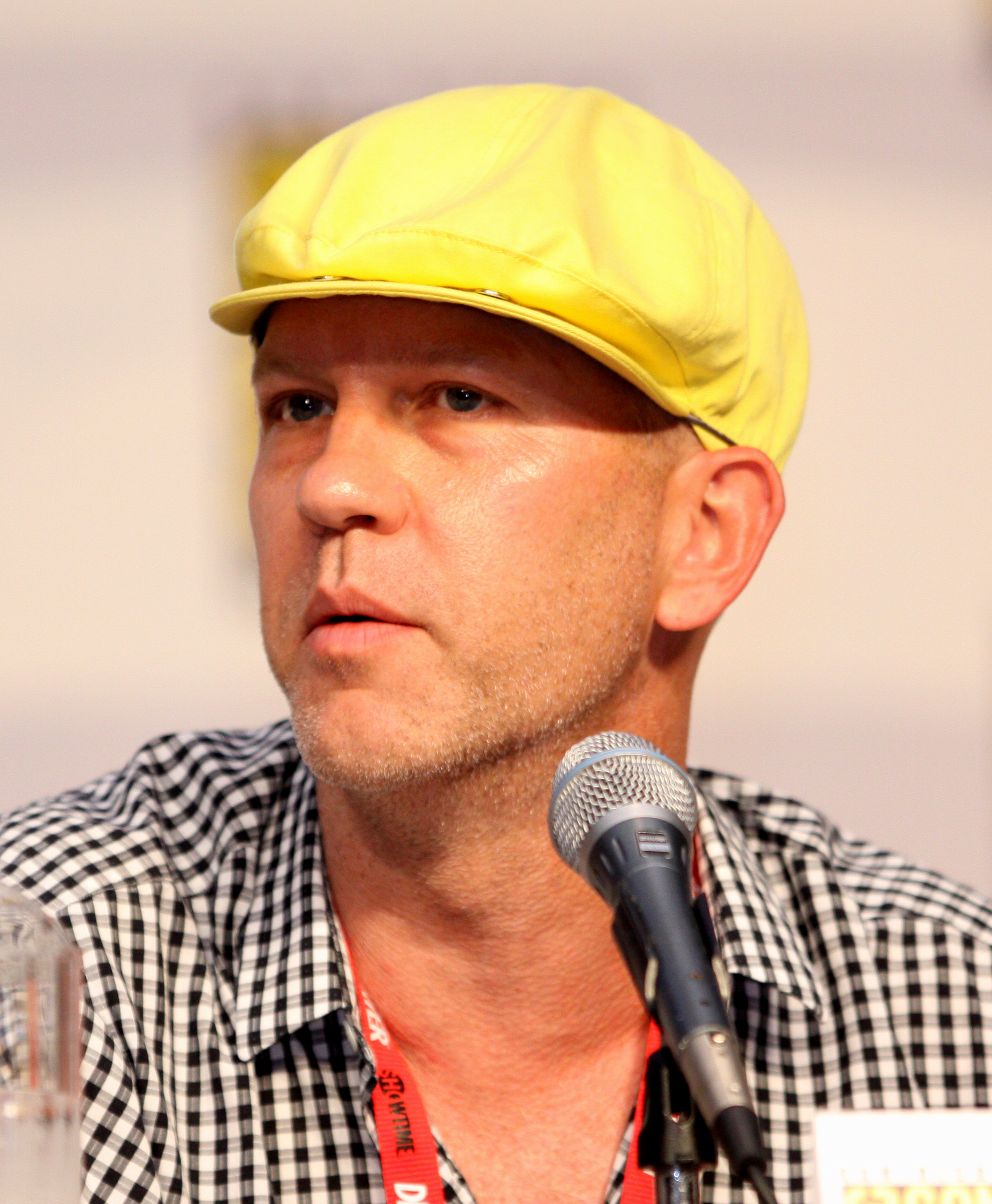
Ryan Murphy, co-writer and director of the pilot episode

Series co-creators Ryan Murphy and Brad Falchuk began working on American Horror Story before their Fox series Glee began production. Murphy wanted to do the opposite of what he'd done previously and thus began his work on the series. He stated, "We're doing some squeaky clean, sweet, optimistic, non-cynical piece, I wanted to do something that sorta tapped into the different side of my personality." Falchuk was intrigued by the idea of putting a different angle on the horror genre, stating that their main goal in creating the series was to scare viewers. He said, "You want people to be a little bit off balance afterwards." The dark tone of the series was influenced by the 1970s ABC soap opera Dark Shadows, which Murphy's grandmother forced him to watch when he was younger to toughen him up. In addition, the series draws inspiration from classic horror films such as Roman Polanski's Rosemary's Baby and Stanley Kubrick's The Shining.

In February 2011, FX officially announced that it had ordered a pilot for a possible series from Murphy and Falchuk, with both as episode writers and Murphy as director. Dante Di Loreto was announced as executive producer. Production on the series began in April 2011. On July 18, 2011, FX officially announced the project had been picked up to series. On August 3, 2011, it was announced that Tim Minear, Jennifer Salt, James Wong and Jessica Sharzer had joined the series as writers.

=== Casting and filming ===
Casting announcements began in March 2011, with Connie Britton first to be cast, portraying female lead Vivien Harmon. Britton stated that she took a risk in taking the role of Vivien. When Ryan Murphy presented the role to her he said, "This is something we've never seen you do before. It will be turning what you've just been doing on its ear." She was intrigued by what he had presented her and ultimately decided to take the part. Denis O'Hare joined the cast in late March as Larry Harvey. Jessica Lange joined the cast in April as Constance, marking her first regular role on television. Lange was attracted to the role because it didn't require a 22 episode commitment. "That was huge for me!" she said. "I wasn't about to commit to, you know, six months. It was cable, rather than network...I've been offered network [shows] before, and determined not to do it, just because I can't make that kind of time commitment."

Dylan McDermott was cast as the lead, Ben Harmon, in late April 2011. His character was initially described as "a handsome and masculine but sensitive therapist who loves his family but has hurt his wife." McDermott stated that he wanted to do the role to break away from his previous role as Bobby Donnell in the ABC series The Practice. "This was exactly why I wanted to do this show – to change it up and do a different kind of character," he said. "People think of me as the guy from The Practice...I wanted to turn that [notion] on its head and hopefully I'm doing that [with this show]."

In May 2011, Taissa Farmiga and Evan Peters were the last lead actors to be cast, portraying Violet Harmon and Tate Langdon, respectively. Farmiga said that she loved Violet "immediately" and that "she had spunk to her, she had attitude." Ryan Murphy has described Tate as the "true monster" of the series, adding, "To Evan's great credit and the credit of the writers, I think Evan's done an amazingly difficult job making a monster sympathetic."

The pilot episode was shot on location in a house in Country Club Park, Los Angeles, California, which serves as the haunted house and crime scene in the series. Designed and built around 1908 by Alfred Rosenheim, the president of the Los Angeles chapter of the American Institute of Architects, the Tudor or Collegiate Gothic-style single family home was previously used as a convent. The series is filmed on sets that are an exact replica of the house. Details such as Lewis Comfort Tiffany stained glass windows, and hammered bronze light fixtures, were re-created to preserve the look of the house.

== Promotion ==
As part of the promotion for the series, FX launched a "House Call" campaign, in which viewers at home could sign up and come face-to-face with a character from the series. Prior to the series premiere, FX released several clues to shine light on the series. They were offered on the show's official YouTube channel. Ten clues were released, entitled "Cello", "Baby", "Couples", "Coffin", "Lying Down", "Fire", "Stairs", "Melt", "Red Cello" and "Rubber Bump".

== Reception ==
In its original American broadcast, the premiere of American Horror Story was seen by an estimated 3.18 million household viewers and gained a 1.6 ratings share among adults aged 18–49, according to Nielsen Media Research. These were the best numbers FX had ever received for a series premiere. Taken together with equally strong numbers for the station's returning original series – Sons of Anarchy, It's Always Sunny in Philadelphia and The League – the episode helped make October the most-watched month on FX ever. The pilot episode aired on November 7, 2011, across Europe and Latin America on Fox International Channels, ranking #1 or #2 among all Pay-TV in most metered markets across Latin America and Europe for its time slot. In the UK, it premiered on non-terrestrial channel FX, with 128,200 viewers. The episode was seen by 3.2 million viewers total in 59 countries.

The pilot episode scored 62 out of 100 on Metacritic based on 30 reviews, and Rotten Tomatoes reports a 75% approval rating, based on 8 reviews. Ken Tucker from Entertainment Weekly awarded the pilot episode a B+, stating, "American Horror Story is pretty much all scare, all the time: a whole lotta screams, sex, jolts, mashed faces, psychotic behavior, and dead babies." Chuck Barney of the San Jose Mercury News said, "Most TV shows, after all, quickly fade from memory. This one will haunt your dreams." Hank Stuever from The Washington Post said in his review that "overdoing things is one of Murphy's trademark flaws, but this show has a captivating style and giddy gross-outs." IGN TV's Matt Fowler wrote that the pilot episode contained a lot of "style over substance" but that it was also "totally watchable." Fowler went on to write that it was a "haunting, subversive television experiment" and enjoyed the references to Amityville Horror, The Shining and Twin Peaks. Not all reviews were favorable. Alan Sepinwall of HitFix gave the series a D−, saying, "It is so far over the top that the top is a microscopic speck in its rearview mirror, and so full of strange sounds, sights and characters that you likely won't forget it – even though many of you will wish you could."
