= Murder House (The Hardy Boys) =

2008 novel by Franklin W. Dixon

- Author: Franklin W. Dixon
- Cover artist: Michael Frost
- Series: The Murder House Trilogy and The Hardy Boys Undercover Brothers
- Genre: Young adult crime novel
- Publisher: Aladdin Paperbacks
- Publication date: September 30, 2008
- Media type: Print (Paperback)
- Pages: 160 pp
- ISBN: 1-4169-6409-6
- OCLC: 181602231
- Preceded by: House Arrest
- Followed by: Double Trouble

Murder House is the final book in The Murder House Trilogy and the 24th book in The Hardy Boys Undercover Brothers series. It was published on September 30, 2008.
