= Rosenheim Mansion =

Historic building in California

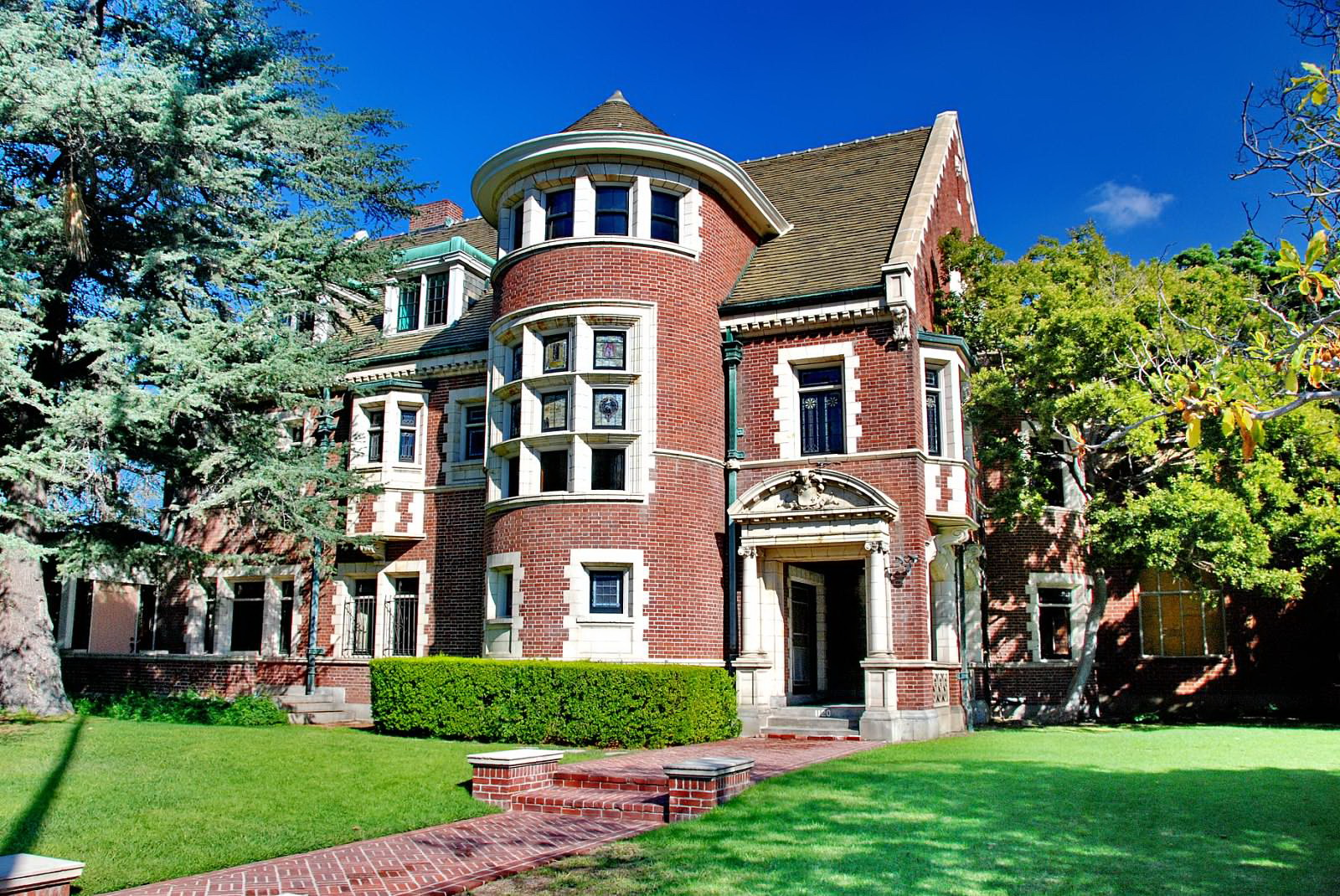
- The mansion in 2014

- Location within the Los Angeles metropolitan area Location within California Location within the United States

General information
- Architectural style: Tudor Revival and Gothic Revival
- Location: 1120 Westchester Pl, Los Angeles, CA 90019
- Coordinates: 34.0501°N 118.3173°W
- Named for: Alfred Rosenheim
- Year built: 1908
- Owner: Angela Oakenfold; Dr. Ernst von Schwarz

Technical details
- Material: Bricks and Peruvian mahogany
- Floor count: 3
- Floor area: 10,440 sq ft (970 m^{2})
- Grounds: 30,000 sq ft (2,800 m^{2})

Design and construction
- Architect: Alfred Rosenheim
- Known for: Filming location

Los Angeles Historic-Cultural Monument
- Designated: June 22, 1999
- Reference no.: 660

The Rosenheim Mansion, also known as the Murder House, is a historic building in the Country Club Park neighborhood of Los Angeles. It was the home of architect Alfred Rosenheim, who built the mansion in 1908. It is also known for its popularity as a filming location, especially for the series American Horror Story.

== History ==
Rosenheim built the mansion in 1908. After living in the house for ten years, the Rosenheims sold it to A.J. McQuatters, the president of the Alvarado Mining and Milling Company, in 1918. Edward Everett Horton then lived there in the early 1930s. The Sisters of Social Service then took over the mansion in 1930, using it as a convent and adding a chapel to the building in 1932. The nuns left the residence in 1994. In 1999, the site was declared a Los Angeles Historic-Cultural Monument.

The property was put on the market again by real estate agent Joe Babajian for $4.5 million in 2011. In early 2012, it was listed for $12 million, but by July it had decreased to $7.8 million. In 2014, it was priced at $5 million but was eventually sold in 2015 for $3.2 million. Its buyers were cardiologist Dr. Ernst von Schwarz and Angela Oakenfold, the ex-wife of record producer Paul Oakenfold. Oakenfold and von Schwarz sued the sellers of the house in 2018 for not disclosing that the property was featured on American Horror Story, as fans frequently visit the area. In 2016, it was listed in Airbnb for $1,450 a night, accommodating 16 people.

== Design ==
The building, built in a Tudor Revival and Gothic Revival style, covers 10,440 sq ft (970 m^{2}) on a 30,000 sq ft (2,800 m^{2}) lot. The house has three stories and is made from Italian bricks with Peruvian mahogany paneling. A 56 ft (17 m)-tall chapel adjoining the building was converted into a ballroom but is mainly used as a recording studio. Some display cases and a pair of doors are made from Tiffany glass. The mansion also contains six Batchelder fireplaces. There is a hidden room in the basement and a gym, and most of the building's ceilings are hand-painted.

== Media filmed at the mansion ==
Numerous films and TV series have been filmed at the mansion, including:

- The Twilight Zone (1959)
- Dragnet (1987)
- Buffy the Vampire Slayer (S4E4 - "Fear, Itself") (1999)
- Seabiscuit (2003)
- American Horror Story: Murder House (2011)
- Alfred Hitchcock Presents
- Californication
- CSI: Miami
- Grey's Anatomy
- Law & Order
- The Mentalist
- The X-Files
- American Horror Story: Apocalypse (2018)
- Sweet Deceit (S1E3 - "Trick or Treat: Horror Story House") (2026)
