= Murder House (American Horror Story episode) =

- American Horror Story episode
- Episode no.: Season 1 Episode 3
- Directed by: Bradley Buecker
- Written by: Jennifer Salt
- Production code: 1ATS02
- Original air date: October 19, 2011
- Running time: 42 minutes

Guest appearances
- Kate Mara as Hayden McClaine; Frances Conroy as Moira O'Hara; Alexandra Breckenridge as Young Moira; Lily Rabe as Nora Montgomery; Matt Ross as Charles Montgomery; Christine Estabrook as Marcy; Geoffrey Rivas as Detective Jack Colquitt; Adina Porter as Sally Freeman; David Anthony Higgins as Stan; Eve Gordon as Dr. Hall; Eric Close as Hugo Langdon; Abbie Cobb as Dorothy Hudson

Episode chronology
| ← Previous "Home Invasion" | Next → "Halloween" |
- American Horror Story: Murder House

"Murder House" is the third episode of the first season of the television series American Horror Story, which premiered on the network FX on October 19, 2011. The episode was written by Jennifer Salt and directed by Bradley Buecker. The episode is rated TV-MA (LSV).

In the episode, Ben (Dylan McDermott) is paid a visit by an upset Hayden (Kate Mara), who demands he tell his wife the truth. Vivien (Connie Britton) learns about the house's former residents: a crazed surgeon, Charles Montgomery (Matt Ross), and wife, Nora (Lily Rabe), who provided illegal abortions in their basement, until their bitter marriage mysteriously ended. Kate Mara guest stars as Hayden McClaine.

== Plot ==
Flashing back to 1983, Hugo Langdon, the husband of Constance, begins making unwanted sexual remarks/advances to a young Moira who's fixing up a bed in the room. She keeps on turning him down in order to keep her job. Hugo throws her on the bed and rapes her. Constance walks in on them, misinterpreting his advances on Moira as consensual. As a result, a heartbroken Constance kills them both by shooting Moira in the eye and Hugo in the chest.

The Harmons' finances take a blow, making moving impractical. Meanwhile, Ben falls asleep during an appointment and wakes up in the yard having dug a hole, but with no memory.

Moira continues to sexually harass Ben, and he threatens to fire her. He is unable to convince Vivien about Moira's sexual advances, and Moira threatens to sue if they try to fire her without just cause.

Hayden arrives, announces that she is keeping the baby and moving nearby, and wants Ben to continue their affair.

Vivien goes on a bus tour of haunted places in Los Angeles, after finding the house is on the tour, where the origin of the house is explained. Charles Montgomery, the original owner of the house and a doctor, had developed an addiction to anesthesia and began to conduct Frankenstein-like experiments. With the aid of his wife, Nora, Charles started performing abortions on young women. On the bus, Vivien worries that she is miscarrying again, due to vaginal bleeding. The doctor assures Vivien that the baby is fine, but advises that the stress of moving could cause a miscarriage.

Ben encounters Larry, who asks for money. When Ben returns home he blacks out again, and wakes up in the same spot in the yard. As he begins to dig, Constance encourages him to stay with the house and to build something over that spot.

Hayden arrives at the house to speak with Vivien, but Ben manages to calm her down and they share a kiss. She recommends they both go to a restaurant to get something to eat. When he walks Hayden out, she is killed by Larry who bludgeons her with a shovel Ben used earlier. He buries her in the hole Ben had dug, where Moira is also buried. Ben builds a gazebo over the spot, and Constance taunts Moira, telling her that now she is stuck in the house forever.

== Production ==
The episode was written by co-executive producer Jennifer Salt, and directed by editor Bradley Buecker.

== Reception ==
Rotten Tomatoes reports a 67% approval rating, based on 6 reviews. Matt Fowler, in his review for IGN, gave the episode an overall score of 7.5, stating that, ""Murder House" took a bit of a step backwards from the forward momentum we got in "Home Invasion", but it still offered up some wickedly puzzling frights and gave us all a new past atrocity to mull over." Emily VanDerWerff from The A.V. Club gave the episode a D+ grade, and said that American Horror Story is "a terrible, messed-up television show. And yet by doing virtually everything horribly, it becomes preposterously entertaining."

In its original American broadcast, the third episode of American Horror Story was seen by an estimated 2.58 million household viewers and gained a 1.5 ratings share among adults aged 18–49, according to Nielsen Media Research. The episode rose a tenth from the previous episode.
