= Washington Irving Branch =

- Washington Irving Branch (Original)
- U.S. National Register of Historic Places
- Los Angeles Historic-Cultural Monument
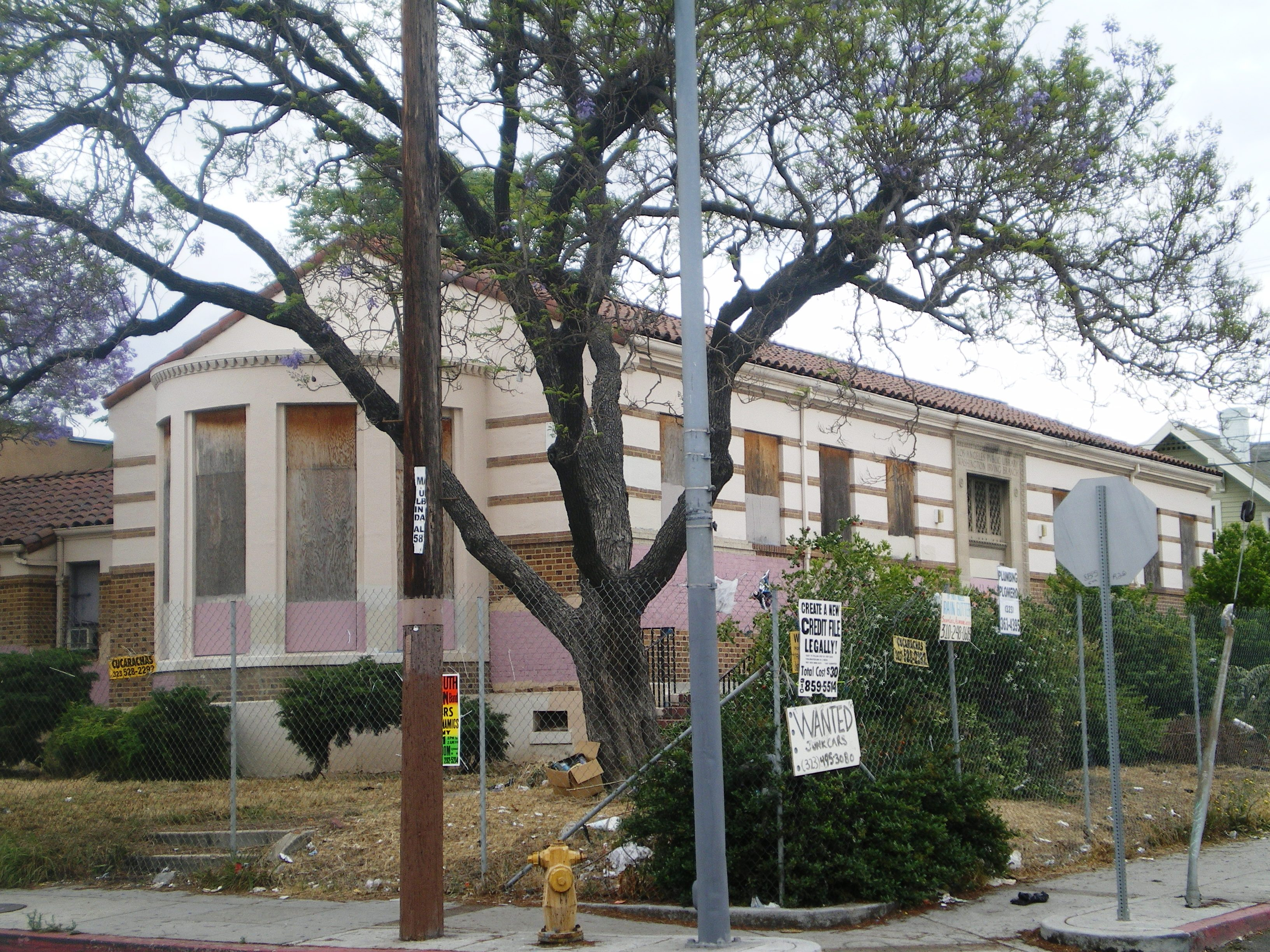
- Original Washington Irving Branch, May 2008

- Location within Los Angeles Location within the Los Angeles metropolitan area Location within California Location within the United States
- Location: 1802 South Arlington Avenue, Los Angeles, California
- Coordinates: 34°2′22″N 118°19′1″W
- Built: 1926
- Architect: Allison & Allison
- Architectural style: Late 19th and 20th Century Revivals, Romanesque Revival-Mediterranean Revival
- MPS: Los Angeles Branch Library System
- NRHP reference No.: 87001010
- LAHCM No.: 307

Significant dates
- Added to NRHP: May 19, 1987
- Designated LAHCM: June 27, 1986

The original Washington Irving Branch library, located at 1802 South Arlington Avenue in Los Angeles, is listed on the National Register of Historic Places. Built in 1926, it was closed and replaced by a new branch, located at 4117 West Washington Boulevard, in 2000.

== Original branch ==
The original branch was located at 1802 South Arlington Avenue, Los Angeles, California. The Romanesque Revival-Mediterranean Revival building was built in 1926 and designed by Allison & Allison. The building has been vacant, boarded and fenced for many years. Built in 1926, the Irving Branch had a long, airy room with exposed wood trusses and rafters. At the time of its closure, no major physical changes had been made to the building since its construction, and books remained housed on thick wood shelves.

The Washington Irving Branch was designated as a Historic-Cultural Monument by the Los Angeles Cultural Heritage Commission in April 1984.

In 1987, the Washington Irving Branch and several other branch libraries in Los Angeles were added to the National Register of Historic Places as part of a thematic group submission. The application noted Irving Branch was a one-story Mediterranean building, constructed of hollow tile and finished with brick and stucco. It has a rectangular plan with side-facing gables, a symmetrical front elevation, a tiled roof and a bay window on the east side.

When the Los Angeles Library Commission proposed closing the old Irving Branch and re-locating to a modern facility at a new location, the Los Angeles Times wrote: "It is comforting to know that residents of one Mid-City Los Angeles neighborhood are arguing vehemently with City Hall because of a library. ... The city proposes a more complete and modern library that would be just 13 blocks away, currently the site of a carwash. This makes sense. So would upgrading the historic building that houses the present branch, perhaps as a community center - where that 'neighborhood' feeling it now encourages would continue to be nurtured."

In June 1990, the Los Angeles Library Commission voted to close the old library and re-open the Washington Irving Branch in a different location. The majority of 62 speakers at a public forum on the closure spoke in favor of saving the old branch by renovating and expanding the existing structure. Commission President Martha D. Katsufrankis said at the time: "I'm old and I appreciate old things, but we have to think about serving the whole community for the future." At the time, City Councilman Nate Holden guaranteed that another "viable funded" use, such as a community center, would be found for the old structure. Area residents, however, were skeptical about promises to preserve the old building, one stating, "I don't believe that for one second. What are they going to turn it into-a police station? A fire station? It's a library, damn it." The library commission agreed in 1991 not to move the Irving branch from its historic Mid-City home of 65 years until a new tenant could be found to take over the building. Residents had feared that the library would be closed and the building left vacant. Library Commissioner Douglas Ring noted at the time: "Everyone knows if you vacate a building and don't have an alternative tenant it is the same as destroying it. That's not what anyone wants."

The library continued in operation, with events listed in the Los Angeles Times, through March 1999. Despite the promises, a new tenant or use was not found. The building has been vacant, boarded up, and fenced for many years. As of 2008, it was marred with graffiti and the lot covered with weeds and litter.

== New branch ==
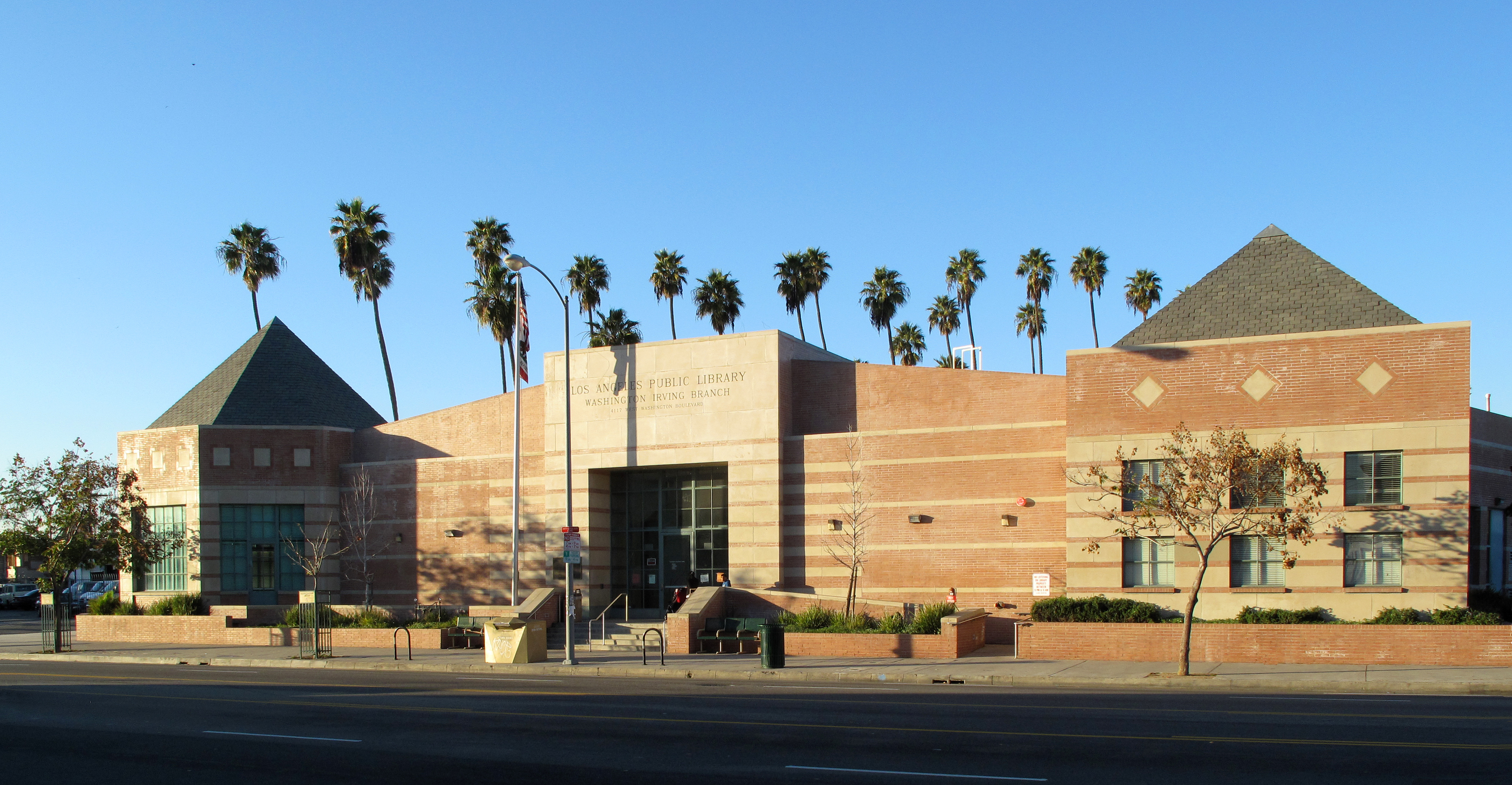
The new library building

The new Washington Irving branch library was dedicated on March 6, 2000. The 12,269-square-foot building is located at 4117 W. Washington Boulevard in the Arlington Heights neighborhood. On July 16, 2022, the Washington Irving Pocket Park opened next to the library. Then-councilman Herb Wesson said "“This park is a great example of the community, the Council Office, and the two departments (Recreation & Parks and Library) all working together to utilize this space more effectively.”"

== See also ==
- List of Registered Historic Places in Los Angeles
- List of Los Angeles Historic-Cultural Monuments in South Los Angeles
- Los Angeles Public Library
