= Arlington Heights, Los Angeles =

Arlington Heights
- Neighborhood
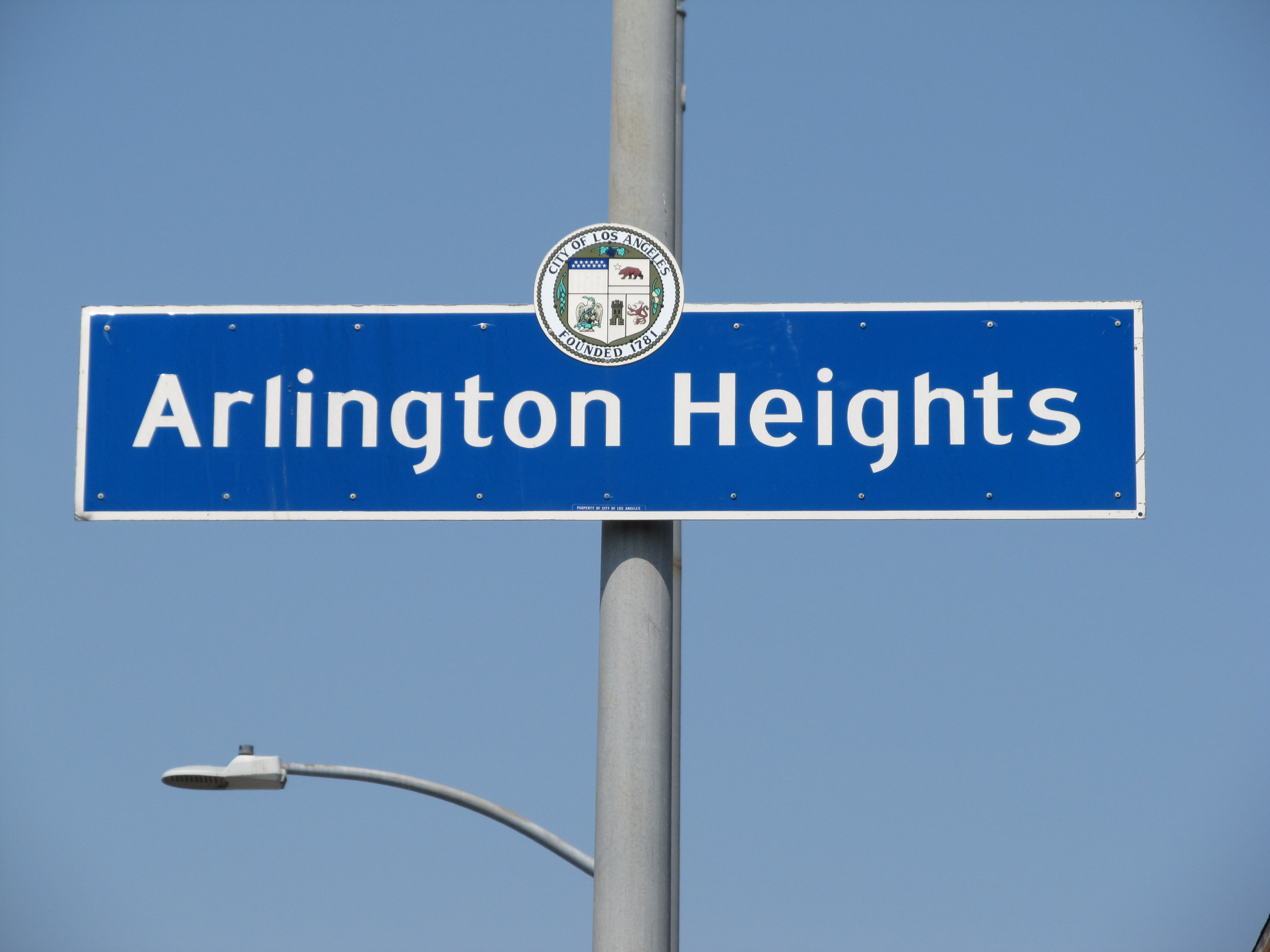
- Arlington Heights neighborhood sign located at the intersection of Arlington Avenue and Washington Boulevard

- Location in Central Los Angeles
- Coordinates: 34°02′32″N 118°19′08″W
- Country: United States
- State: California
- City: Los Angeles

Arlington Heights is a neighborhood in Central Los Angeles, California.

== History ==
=== Origin ===
In July 1904, the Los Angeles Evening Express reported the sale of a sixty acre tract known as Arlington Heights for the price of $75,000. The parcel fronted Pico Street and Washington Streets with the Sixteenth Street car line running through the tract. It noted that the property was to be sub-divided and the streets "finely improved". By 1906, sub-divided lots were listed with selling prices from $995 to $2900.

In 1910, the Arlington Heights Improvement Association announced that they spent $16,000 to purchase 10 lots (between Washington and Eighteenth Street) to put up a school that would cost an additional $25,000.

=== Demolition threat ===
In February 1988, Mount Vernon Junior High was considering an expansion that would have torn down 29 homes in the neighborhood. At that time, the Los Angeles Times described Arlington Heights as an "Inner City Oasis". The school district was considering one of two options: demolition of existing homes or adding new stories to existing buildings. The following month, the Times reported that the expansion plan had been shelved and homes would not be taken. Homeowners said that they still planned to seek historic status for their homes to prevent future condemnation should the district change position.

=== Renaming of Mount Vernon Junior High ===
In the 1990s, there was a movement to rename Mount Vernon Junior High after Wyatt Earp of O.K. Corral fame. The school is located on the site of the gunfighter’s last home at 4004 W. 17th Street. At the time, then-councilman Nate Holden said “I like the sound of ‘Wyatt Earp Junior High.’” Holden's proposal ran into opposition and was later dropped. In 2006, the school was renamed after attorney Johnnie L. Cochran Jr. and 17th Street was rechristened as Johnnie Cochran Vista. Cochran had attended Mount Vernon and had been a member of the debating team.

== Geography ==
The neighborhood is located within the West Adams District.

Per Council File: 02-2353, adopted on October 30, 2002, the City of Los Angeles defined Arlington Heights as the area bounded by the west side of Arlington Avenue, the east side of Crenshaw Boulevard, the north side of Washington Boulevard and the south side of Pico Boulevard. At that time, The Los Angeles Department of Transportation was instructed to install neighborhood signs at the following locations: Arlington and Pico Boulevard (southwest corner), Arlington Avenue and Washington Boulevard (northeast corner), Crenshaw and Washington Boulevards (northeast corner), Crenshaw and Venice Boulevards (southeast corner), Crenshaw and Pico Boulevards (southeast corner), Arlington Avenue and Venice Boulevard (northwest corner).

The neighborhood of Country Club Park is located north of Pico Boulevard. Angelus Vista is located east of Arlington Avenue. The neighborhoods of Victoria Park and Lafayette Square are located west of Crenshaw Boulevard. West Adams Terrace is to the south.

== Population ==
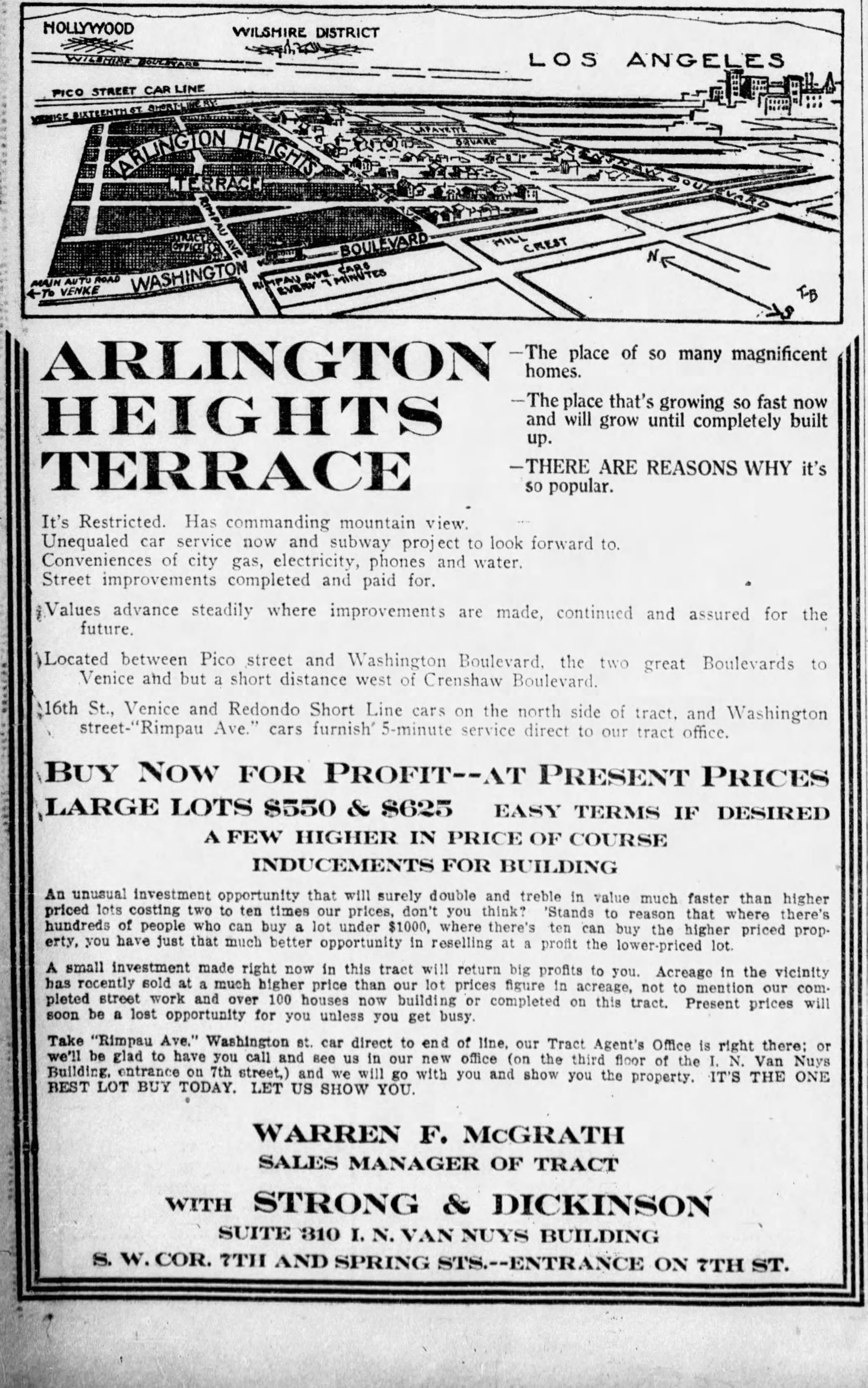
"Arlington Heights Terrace" The Los Angeles Times, February 9, 1913

The following statistics apply only to the area defined by the Mapping L.A. project, which combines the neighborhoods of Arlington Heights, Country Club Park, Western Heights and Angeulus Vista:

The 2000 U.S. census counted 22,096 residents in the 1.03-square-mile neighborhood—an average of 21,423 people per square mile, among the highest population densities in the county. In 2008, the city estimated that the population had increased to 23,330. The median age for residents was 31, about average for both the city and the county.

Arlington Heights was said to be "highly diverse" when compared to the city at large. The ethnic breakdown in 2000 was: Latinos, 56.6%; blacks, 24.5%; Asians, 12.9%; whites, 4.7%; and others, 1.2%. Mexico (34,9%) and El Salvador (20.2%) were the most common places of birth for the 49.8% of the residents who were born abroad, a figure that was considered high in comparison with foreign-born in the city as a whole.

The median household income in 2008 dollars was $31,421, considered low for both the city and the county. The percentage of households earning $20,000 or less was high, compared to the county at large. The household size of three people was just about average for Los Angeles. Renters occupied 81.6% of the housing units, and home- or apartment owners the rest.

The percentages of never-married men (42.4%) and never-married women (35.9%) were among the county's highest. The census found 1,165 families headed by single parents, the 23.5% rate being considered high for both the city and the county.

Arlington Heights residents aged 25 and older holding a four-year degree amounted to 13.9% of the population in 2000, about average for both the city and the county, although there was a high percentage of residents with less than a high school diploma.

== Historic-Cultural Monuments ==
- Original building for the Washington Irving branch library - 1802 South Arlington Avenue. Built in 1926, it became Los Angeles Historic-Cultural Monument 307 in 1986.
- Tate-McCoy Homestead - 1463–1469 S. Norton Avenue. In 2005, it became Los Angeles Historic-Cultural Monument 811.

== Landmarks and attractions ==
- Jewel's Catch One - Opened in 1973 at 4067 West Pico Boulevard, it was the nation's first black gay and lesbian disco. Since 2015, it has operated as a more traditional nightclub with an array of live DJ sets and performances by house music and rap artists.

== Parks and recreation ==
- Washington Irving Pocket Park - 4103 West Washington Boulevard. It is a 13-acre park adjacent to the library.

== Public libraries ==
The neighborhood is served by the Los Angeles Public Library system. There is one branch in Arlington Heights.

- Washington Irving - 4117 West Washington Boulevard, just east of Crenshaw Boulevard

== Public schools ==
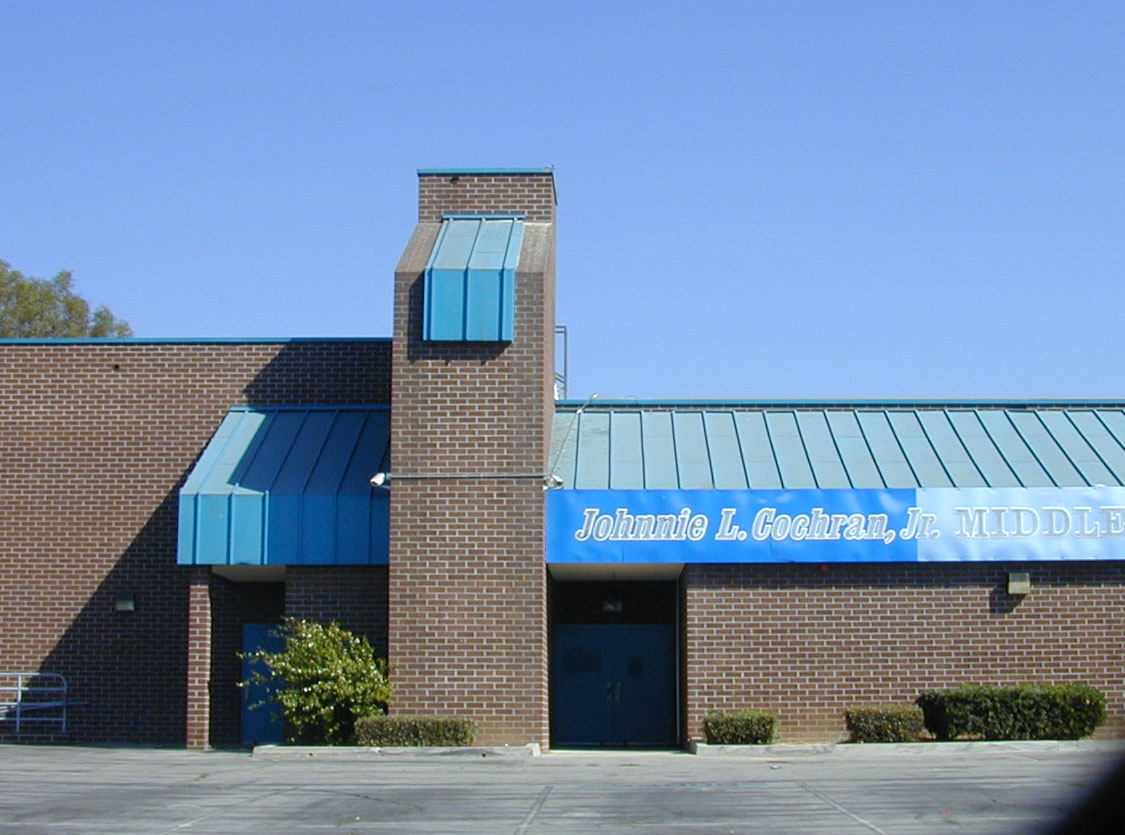
Johnnie L. Cochran Jr. Middle School

- Los Angeles Technology Center, LAUSD adult education, 3721 Washington Boulevard
- Johnnie L. Cochran Jr. Middle School, LAUSD, 4066 West Johnnie Cochran Vista
- Arlington Heights Elementary School, LAUSD, 1717 Seventh Avenue

== Notable residents ==
- James Hanley - 1152 Norton Avenue
- Wyatt Earp - 4004 W. 17th Street
- Melanie Lomax
