= The Murder House Trilogy =

Book miniseries by Franklin W. Dixon

- Cover art for the first two books in the trilogy.
- Author: Franklin W. Dixon
- Cover artist: Michael Frost
- Language: English
- Genre: Detective, mystery novel
- Publisher: Aladdin Paperbacks
- Publication date: May 20, 2008
- Publication place: United States
- Media type: Print (paperback)
- Pages: 496
- Preceded by: Comic Con Artist

The Murder House Trilogy is a three-part detective fiction mini-series in The Hardy Boys Undercover Brothers, published by Aladdin Paperbacks (an imprint of Simon & Schuster). The first book in the trilogy, Deprivation House, was published on May 20, 2008, with books #2 House Arrest and #3 Murder House published on July and September respectively.

The words "Undercover Brothers" are written inside the "B" in "Boys" on both covers, but this does not necessarily mean that these three books will be part of the main Undercover Brothers series, as is seen with the Super Mystery series, the Nancy Drew/Hardy Boys SuperMystery series, and the graphic novel series, which all say "Undercover Brothers" on their covers, but are not part actually part of the main series.

The Murder House Trilogy is the first Hardy Boys mini-series since 1993 and only the third official one ever. The other two are the Operation Phoenix Trilogy and the Ring of Evil Trilogy, with Casefiles #8 See No Evil, 16 Line of Fire and #55 Beyond The Law being the only unofficial trilogy.

Also noteworthy is that The Hardy Boys Super Mystery #3 Haunted was published on August 8, right in between the release dates for House Arrest and Murder House. At the time, it was not known why Simon & Schuster would want to disrupt The Murder House Trilogy. Some speculation was Haunted may tie-in with the trilogy.

Aladdin Paperbacks also published a Nancy Drew Girl Detective mini-series; the Perfect Mystery Trilogy which ran from June 2008 – October 2008.
