= Country Club Park, Los Angeles =

Country Club Park
- Neighborhood of Los Angeles
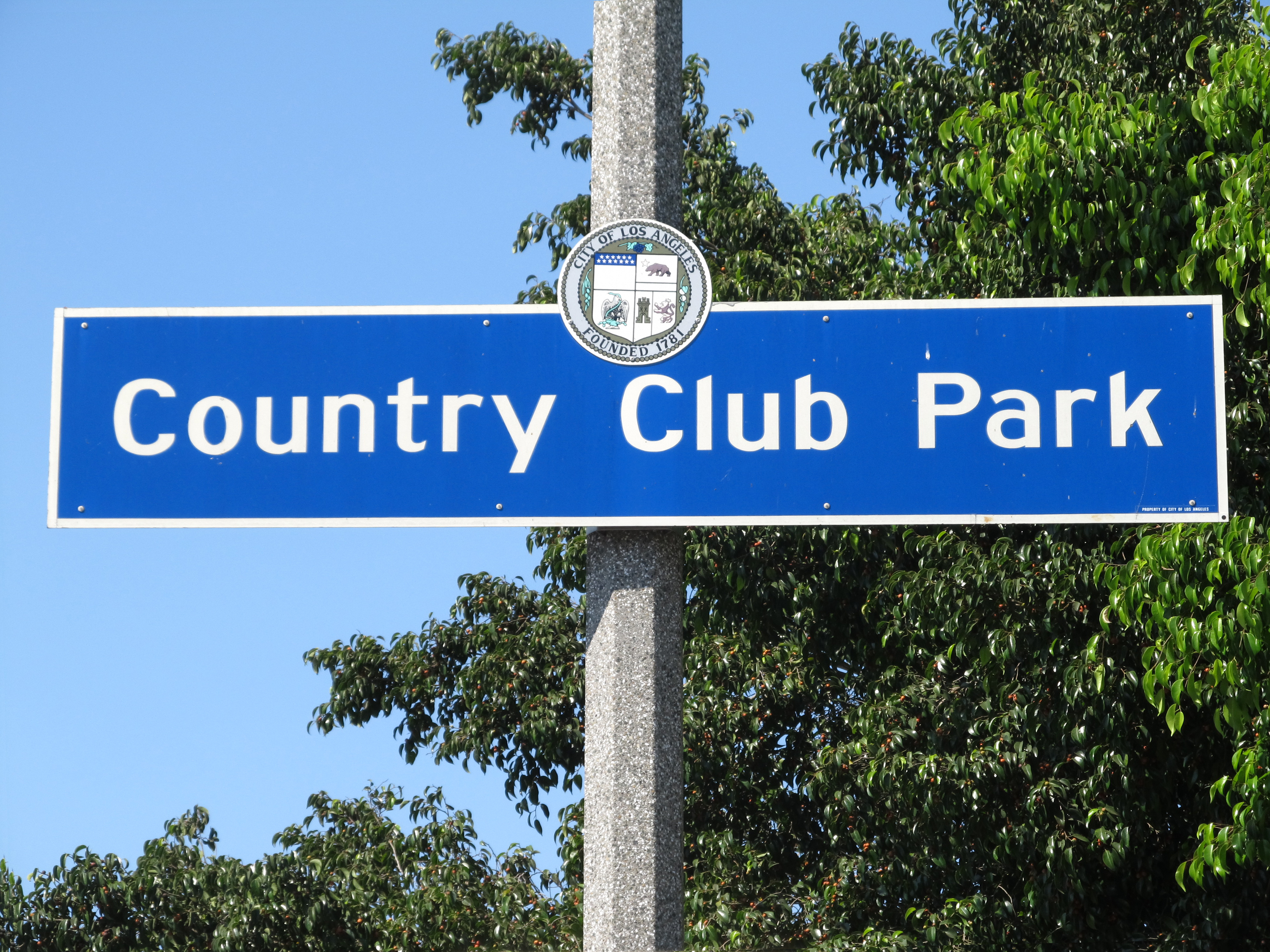
- Country Club Park neighborhood sign located at Crenshaw Boulevard immediately north of Pico Boulevard

- Location within Central Los Angeles
- Coordinates: 34.0511512°N 118.3218523°W
- Country: United States
- State: California
- County: Los Angeles
- Time zone: Pacific
- Zip Code: 90019
- Area code: 323

Country Club Park is a neighborhood in Los Angeles, California.

== History ==
The name Country Club Park refers to the area's previous use. In 1897, The Los Angeles Golf Club established a 9-hole course called the Windmill Links at Pico and Alvarado Street. Overcrowding inspired the organizers to move west and in 1899, the club moved to the corner of Pico and Western (the area that is now Country Club Park). The course remained there until 1910, at which time it moved to Holmby Hills.

After The Los Angeles Golf Club moved west, Isaac Milbank, with partner George Chase, subdivided the property for mostly large homes and mansions. Country Club Park matured in the 1920s and homes were constructed in the latest architectural styles: Craftsman, Tudor Revival, Spanish Colonial Revival, Colonial Revival and Mediterranean Revival.

In the wake of the U.S. Supreme Court ruling in Shelley v. Kraemer (1948) which struck down racial exclusionary covenants, Country Club Park was one of the first affluent neighborhoods in Los Angeles to allow blacks to purchase homes.

In 2010, the neighborhood was designated a Los Angeles Historic Preservation Overlay Zone because of the large number of intact buildings dating back to the earliest phases of Los Angeles’ development.

== Geography ==
Country Club Park is bounded by Olympic Boulevard on the north, Crenshaw Boulevard on the west, Pico Boulevard on the south, and Western Avenue on the east. The neighborhood of Arlington Heights is directly south. Wilshire Park is north. Oxford Square is west.

Country Club Park is partially gated; three streets that intersect Pico Boulevard are closed to through-traffic and pedestrians.

The closed streets at Pico Boulevard, 2017

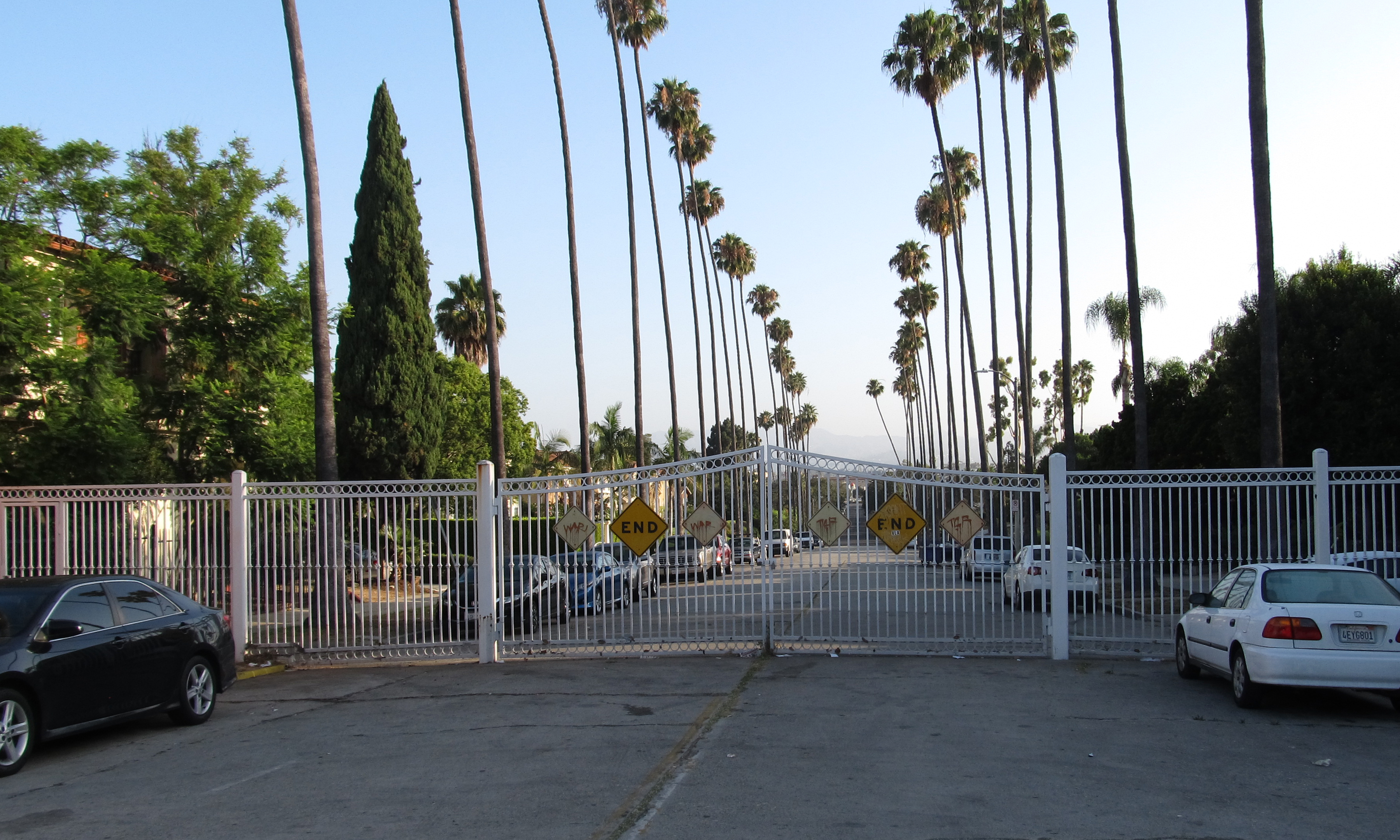
Wilton Place

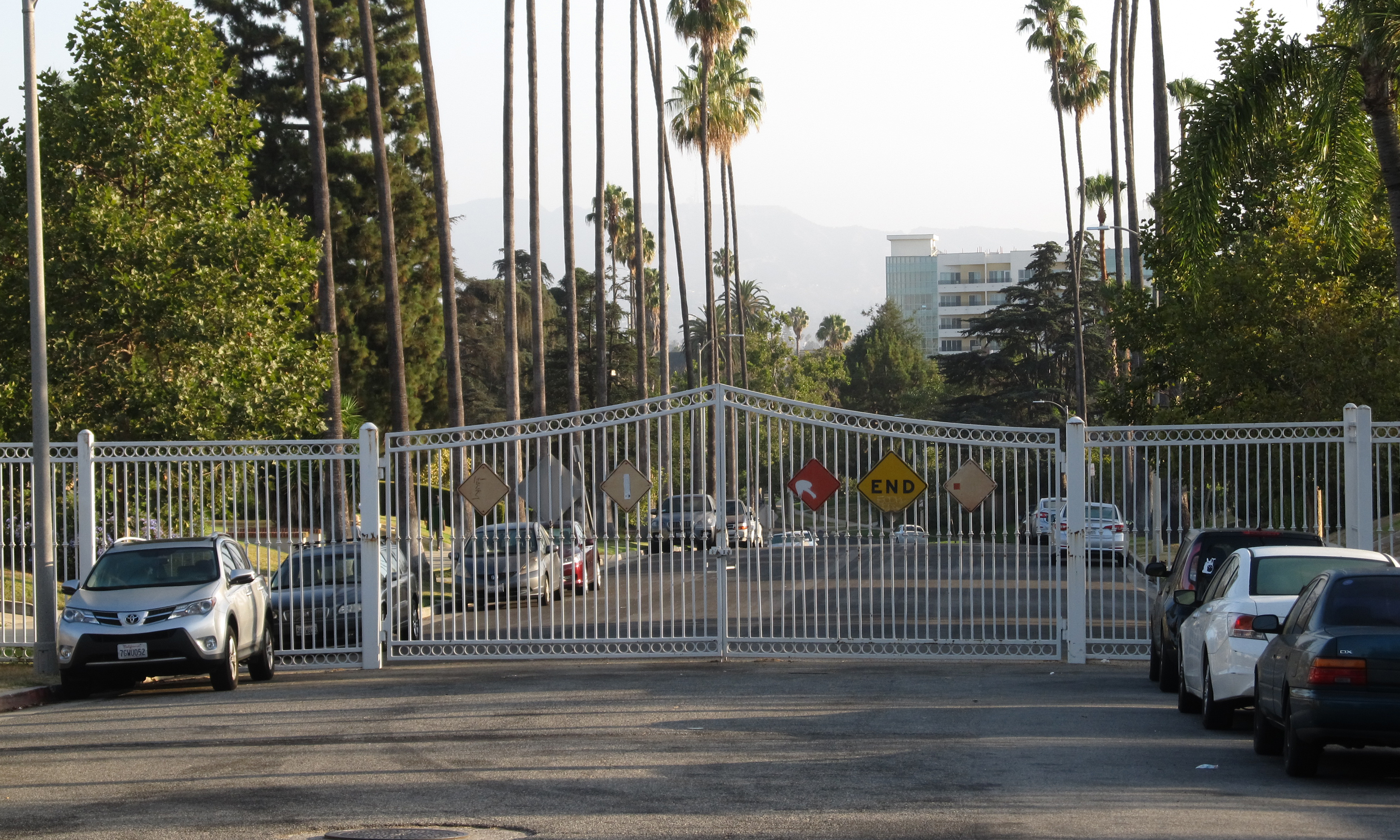
Gramercy Place

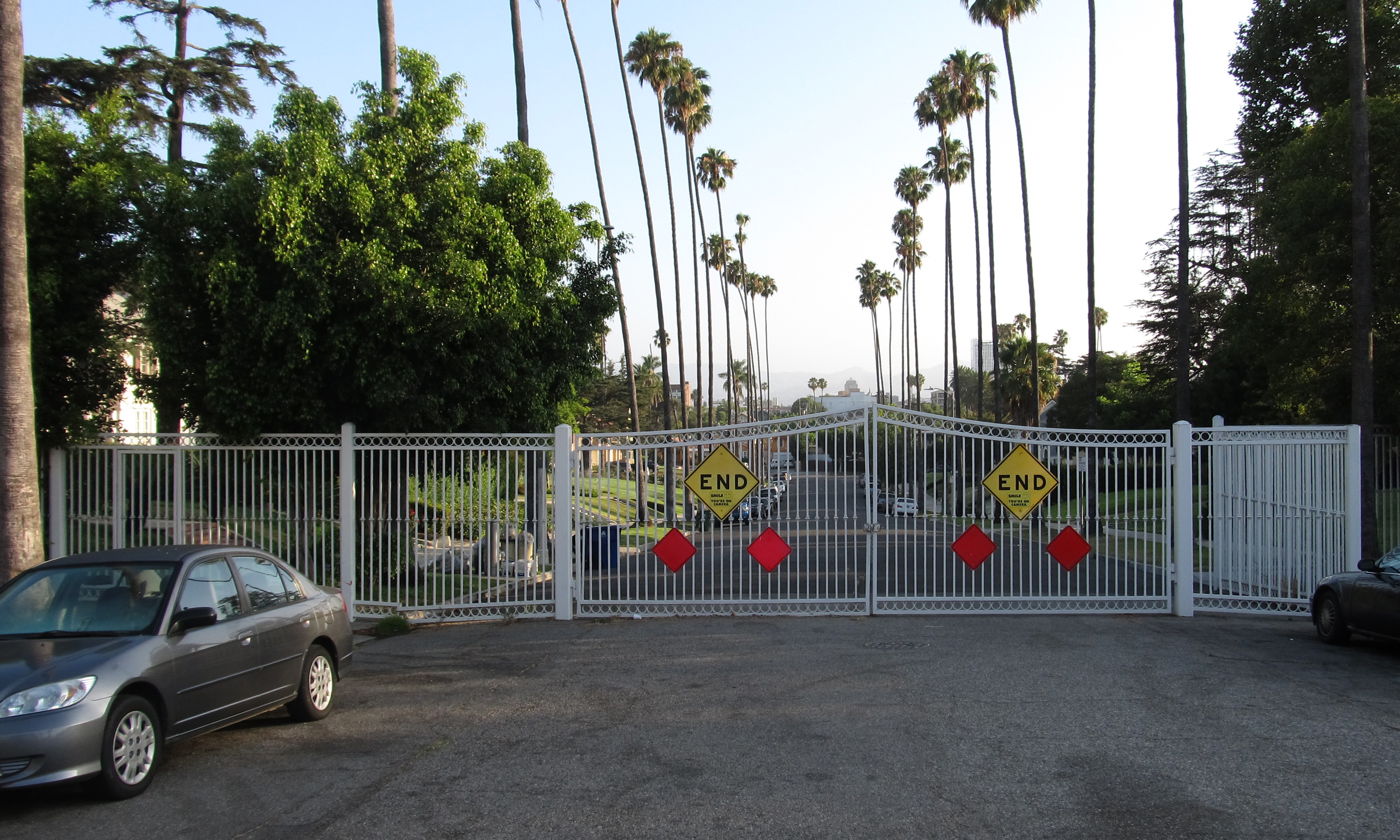
St. Andrews Place

== Parks and recreation ==
- Country Club Park Heritage Plaza - 1015 South Wilton Place. It has a children's play area, picnic tables, and a walking path.

== In Media ==
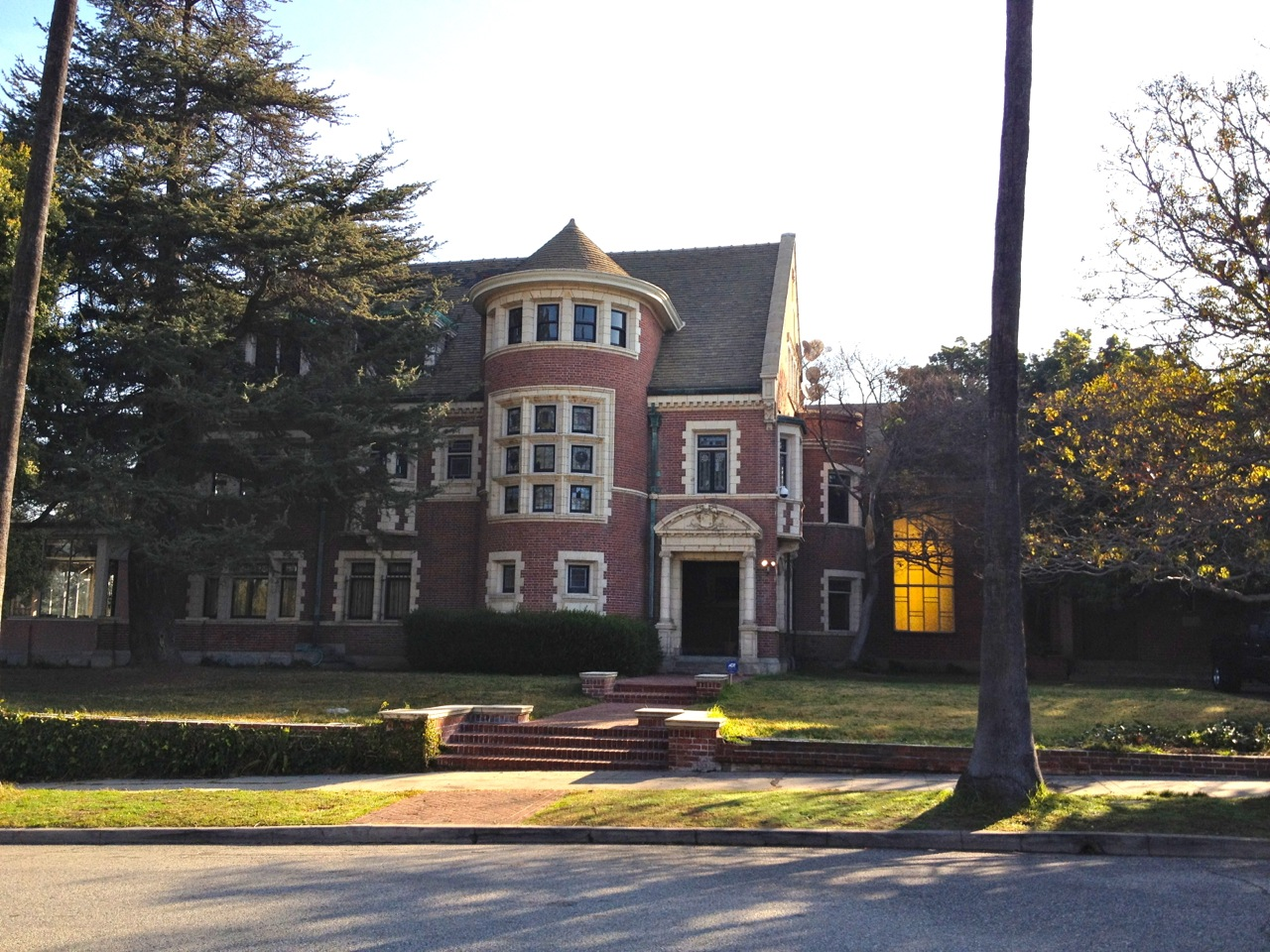
1120 Westchester Place in Country Club Park

- American Horror Story (pilot episode)

Designed and built in 1902 by Alfred Rosenheim, the president of the American Institute of Architects' Los Angeles chapter, the Collegiate Gothic-style single family home is located at 1120 Westchester Place. It is known as the Rosenheim Mansion. The home was previously used as a convent. An adjoining chapel was removed from exterior shots using CGI.

After the pilot episode, filming continued on sets constructed to be an exact replica of the house. Details such as Lewis Comfort Tiffany stained glass windows, and hammered bronze light fixtures, were re-created to preserve the look of the house.

- Ali
- Daddy Day Care
- Running with Scissors

== Notable residents ==
- Joel Fluellen, actor
- Lena Horne, entertainer
- Mahalia Jackson, gospel singer
- Thomas Kilgore Jr., clergyman and human rights activist
- Hattie McDaniel, actress
- Lou Rawls, singer
- Marl Young, musician and arranger
