= List of Dragon Striker characters =

Fictional characters

The animated series Dragon Striker features various characters created by Sylvain Dos Santos and Charles Lefebvre. The series is set in a world called Asteria and features people who have tamas, which are essentially superpowers, and use them to play the sport Gorotama. The series centers on Key Nagatatsu, a 12-year-old farm boy who possesses the Dragon tama, the most powerful tama, and is destined to become the Dragon Striker. He attends the school Kal Asterock and befriends a group of outcasts to form the team the Knights and play against the school's other banner teams.

This is a list of characters who appear in the show.

== Main ==
=== Key Nagatatsu ===
Key Nagatatsu
- Created by: Sylvain Dos Santos; Charles Lefebvre
- Voiced by: Akshay Kumar
- Age: 12

In-universe information
- Alias: Dragon Striker
- Nicknames: Keith; Farm Boy
- Species: Human
- Gender: Male
- Occupation: Gorotama player
- Affiliation: The Knights
- Family: Dino Nagatatsu (father); Edina Nagatatsu † (mother)

Key Nagatatsu is a 12-year-old boy who was raised on the farm by his widowed father Dino. Having grown up loving the sport Gorotama, he was excited to head into Mestras with his father in hopes of seeing a game up close. He meets Ssyelle Tournefeuille, who has similar hopes and whom he bonds with over a shared love of the sport. His wish to see a game comes true when he convinces an exhibition match to let Ssyelle play for them when one of their players is unable to. When Key believes that harsh player Ragno is about to harm Ssyelle, his Dragon tama awakens, catching the attention of Goyen Sugoi. Sugoi, having known Key's mother Edina, convinces him that he is the destined Dragon Striker and that he must attend Kal Asterock.

Key is an outgoing, emotional young boy who often tries to make light of situations. He has difficulty "picking his fights" and will go out of his way to defend his friends or talk up against someone whom he deems as disrespectful, such as Ragno. He occasionally has trouble controlling his temper, which is implied to be due to the severity of his tama and his lack of control over it. Key is also easily amazed at other people's tamas and tries to be supportive of those who might feel inferior, with his ability to make others feel better usually resulting in him getting supported back. He usually feels like he has something to prove and wants to please people or live up to their expectations.

Key's tama is the Dragon tama, which manifests as flames that he is able to produce from his body. This becomes apparent when he kicks the ball into a flaming spire or exerts fire blasts from his feet, allowing him to essentially rocket across the field. When he unleashes the full might of the Dragon tama, he develops flaming horns and wings and gets a draconic looking eye. As the series progresses, it becomes apparent that his tama is difficult to control and, if not utilized properly, could lead to destruction. It is later revealed that he has a literal dragon in his subconscious that is rooted into his abilities.

His last name is of Japanese origin and directly translates to "eternal dragon".

=== Ssyelle Tournefeuille ===
Ssyelle Tournefeuille
- Created by: Sylvain Dos Santos; Charles Lefebvre
- Voiced by: Rebecca LaChance
- Age: 12

In-universe information
- Species: Human
- Gender: Female
- Occupation: Gorotama player
- Affiliation: The Knights
- Family: Mr. Tournefeuille (father)

Ssyelle Tournefeuille (pronounced see-ell turn-a-foy) is a 12-year-old girl who dreams of becoming a Gorotama player. After meeting Key, she starts to seriously pursue wanting to be a goalkeeper and ends up joining Kal Asterock with him. When Key and Milo Stonegarden fail to pass the banner trials, Ssyelle refuses to join any of the other banner teams and tries to find a loophole. She eventually discovers that the Knights, a long abandoned banner team, can be reinstated if she can meet the required minimum and recruits her friends, along with her roommate Ameline and Milo's reluctant older brother Odward. Because of her determination, she becomes the Knights' informal team captain and wants her and her friends to play for glory.

Ssyelle is a smart, determined, and studious girl. While mature, she can also be playful and spastic, making her come off as somewhat eccentric. Having experienced numerous hits to the head, she sometimes experiences minor bouts of forgetfulness. She is also emotional and quick to cry during intense moments. Because of Key's kindness and supportiveness, she has a strong attachment to him, giving the impression of a mutual attraction. Ssyelle and Key later realize that their personalities are similar when, in the heat of the moment, the former begins to display a highly competitive urge that rivals the latter's. Ssyelle is a comforting person and acts as the den mother of the team.

Ssyelle's tama allows her to create bubbles that slow down time. She usually creates them around herself, but occasionally creates one around other people. Anything that enters her bubbles slows down significantly, though they are still able to comprehend it. Her time bubbles only seem to affect her when she allows it to.

=== Milo Stonegarden ===
Milo Stonegarden
- Created by: Sylvain Dos Santos; Charles Lefebvre
- Voiced by: Yeukayi Ushe
- Age: 12

In-universe information
- Species: Human
- Gender: Male
- Occupation: Gorotama player
- Affiliation: The Knights
- Family: Odward Stonegarden (older brother)

Milo Stonegarden is a soft-hearted, kind boy who reluctantly pursues Gorotama. Implied to have come from a wealthy family, Milo attended Kal Asterock with his older brother, Gorotama veteran Odward. Milo did not appear to want anything to do with Gorotama, but, thanks to Key and Ssyelle, sums up the courage to eventually try out for the banner trials. Unfortunately, he and Key do not pass, but Ssyelle, refusing to give up on her friends, convinces them to help rebuild the Knights so that they can play together. Milo ultimately convinces Odward to join their team after he has a bad breakup with Casper and the Bards. Milo soon becomes a major player for the Knights and even gains a following of his own.

Milo is a shy young boy who suffers from self-deprecation and seems to not believe in his own abilities, but makes up for this by being observant and enjoying the finer things in life. As the series progresses, he becomes more determined and supportive, and even begins to see his own value and self-worth. However, he is also cowardly, listing Pregrina Freaks and ghosts as his two biggest fears. When he learns that his tama perfectly combats them, he becomes much more upbeat and ecstatic. He relies on the support of his friends, particularly Key, whom he admires for standing up for him. While he can be pushed to his limits, he can also easily bounce back from trouble and display a courageous attitude.

Milo's tama is the ability to produce jelly, which is multicolored, inedible, and slippery, so much so that Milo occasionally slips on it himself. When he learns to control it, he uses the jelly to slide across the field and slip up the opposing team's players. His tama is also very malleable, as he can easily fuse it with Key's tama to make a jelly dragon, or with Ameline's tama to make power sapping jelly.

=== Odward Stonegarden ===
Odward Stonegarden
- Created by: Sylvain Dos Santos; Charles Lefebvre
- Voiced by: Waylon Jacobs

In-universe information
- Species: Human
- Gender: Male
- Occupation: Gorotama player
- Affiliation: The Knights; The Bards (formally)
- Family: Milo Stonegarden (younger brother)
- Significant other: Casper Ferreiro (ex-boyfriend)

Odward Stonegarden is a fourth-year Gorotama player. Implied to have come from a wealthy family, Odward made a name for himself as part of the Bards at Kal Asterock and formed a romantic attachment to his teammate and captain Casper Ferreiro. By this time his younger brother Milo started attending Kal Asterock, Odward had grown tired of Casper's elitist attitude and soon broke up with him, quitting the Bards when Milo was insulted. Odward initially blamed Milo for his predicament, but after turning him down and seeing no other alternative, he decides to join the recently reinstated team, the Knights. He first viewed them as a group that lacked severe coordination, but over time eventually comes to see them as his proper teammates and friends.

Odward is an arrogant and egotistical person, but, ironically, left his old team because he thought the same of them. Short-tempered and occasionally mean-spirited, Odward started off as a harsh critic, belittling his teammates, particularly Key, for their inability to catch up with the rest of the banner teams. When everyone chooses to have Ssyelle lead them, Odward briefly doubts himself until he begins to receive compliments for his skills and his tall flattop. He begins to mellow out significantly and even begins to become more open to his teammates. He hides a soft and sensitive side that plays to his deepest desires and fears, particularly his unresolved feelings for Casper, whom he is still smitten with. He eventually grows to trust his fellow Knights and comes to rely on them for support.

Odward's tama is the ability to make reflective duplicates of people or objects. He usually uses this to create reflections of himself or the ball to throw off other players. His reflective abilities are so effective that Anansi of the Dragons is unable to detect the real one. He can also use the reflections to mimic other people's voices. However, the downside is that these reflections are brittle and fragile.

=== Ameline ===
Ameline
- Created by: Sylvain Dos Santos; Charles Lefebvre
- Voiced by: Evanna Lynch

In-universe information
- Species: Human
- Gender: Female
- Occupation: Gorotama player
- Affiliation: The Knights

Ameline is a mysterious student at Kal Asterock. Often keeping her nose in her book, Ameline apparently came to Kal Asterock with certain intentions. She kept plenty of books in her dorm, ultimately befriending her new roommate Ssyelle. Later, she met Key and Milo when they were trying to expand their roster for the revived Knights. Without skipping a beat, Ameline accepted being the fourth member of the team. It quickly became apparent that Ameline possessed certain gifts that made her an asset to the team. Ameline continues to refrain from revealing certain aspects about herself, but heavily involves herself with the team whenever they need her.

Ameline is a quiet and studious girl who comes off as enigmatic. She is a bit of a nerd and has an interest in magic and the history of Kal Asterock. She is childlike, often running into and hugging people like a small child would do and speaking in a strange dialect where she simplifies her sentences, saying things like "Need bathroom!" instead of "I need to use the bathroom!" Even though she doesn't talk much about her past, she is sensitive to when people show some doubt or distrust with her. Ameline is smarter than she lets on and holds her teammates near and dear to her.

Ameline's tama is the ability to absorb other tamas. In order for her to do this, she needs to be close to the person in question and literally suck the tama out. She must keep her mouth shut and hold her breath afterwards, or otherwise the tama will leave her and revert to the original host. She can fuse her tama with her teammates like Milo, making a tama sapping jelly.

== Goyens ==
=== Noreen Sugoi ===
Noreen Sugoi (voiced by Flora Montgomery) is the coach for the Dragons, who once played for the team in her youth alongside Edina Nagatatsu, her best friend. Many years later, Sugoi would become the Goyen for the Dragons and invited Edina to her first year. Unfortunately, a situation that was supposedly caused by Edina resulted in her supposed death. Sugoi has since felt that it is her duty to train Key by having him enroll at Kal Asterock. While she failed to have Key become a member of her team, he would bounce back under the Knights, causing her to still keep an eye on him and occasionally pull him to the side to properly teach him certain things about himself.

Sugoi is a calm, yet stern individual who holds the importance of the school and Gorotama above all else. While calculative, she is also warm and caring and holds genuine concern for the students, especially Key. Sugoi has a dry sense of humor, though she rarely shows it, but also has an implied sad longing for her friend Edina. When Key continued to show lack of understanding of his tama, Sugoi was noticeably irate, though later acknowledged this was her problem rather than Key's. Sugoi is very intellectual and carries a good amount of wit.

Sugoi's tama is the ability to mimic other tamas. She has to be touching the other person when she does this, for she loses the ability if she lets go. It is also heavily implied that she can have great mastery over the ability regardless of whether the person she is touching is well skilled at their own tama or not.

=== Surya Sunspear ===
Surya Sunspear (voiced by Silas Carson) is the coach for the Bards. He once played for the team himself when he was younger, but despite his skills was unable to defeat Edina Nagatatsu, giving him growing resentment towards her. On the day Edina sacrificed herself, Surya's face was horrifically scarred, which he uses magic to hide. This caused his hatred toward the Nagatatsus to grow, especially when Edina's son, Key, came to Kal Asterock. Surya appears to have taken it upon himself to see that Key fail or be humiliated at every turn at Kal Asterock, though this usually results in him being disappointed. However, he seems to know things about Edina that later haunts Key.

Surya is a charming, yet conceited and slightly egotistical person. While he takes great pride in his team, he does seem to view them almost like pawns in his own twisted game. Having not won the championship in years, Surya has become somewhat bitter and hides a cynical and furious side to him. He does not seem to care about harming those to get what he wants and seems willing to stoop to murder, but appears to have his own sense of justice and thinks that what he is doing is for the betterment of the school.

Sunspear's tama is the ability to create blinding solar light, which he can manipulate in various ways. It is implied that he can also use it to alter his appearance, as he did with his face.

He is named after Surya, the Hindu God of the sun.

=== Mara O'Gargine ===
Mara O'Gargine is the coach for the Roses. Much like her fellow Goyens, she has been teaching at the school for presumably years. However, she is also implied to be hiding numerous secrets, specifically information regarding the Knights, a team she has been trying to prevent from returning. O'Gargine is presented as a kind, yet tough older woman with a penchant for seeing the best Gorotama players. However, she is also shown to have a tougher and more archaic side to her. After thinking that Ameline stole the powers of one of her students, she was willing to take vigilantism by tracking her down and going so far as to torture her. O'Gargine is someone not to be trifled with.

O'Gargine's tama is the ability to control vines, which she can manipulate at will and change the size of.

=== Sanga ===
Sanga (voiced by Patrice Naiambana) is the coach for the Shadows. Possibly the oldest Goyen, he has been leading his team to the point that everyone seems to find him scary. His history is enigmatic, but he also seems to have bad history with the Knights and its current iteration, going so far as to send his own students to ransack their dorms for a missing item of his. While he is much more restrained than his fellow Goyens, Sanga does have a malicious side to him, though he is willing to let things go if they meet his approval. He was also up to acting as a guinea pig for the Goyens to see if Ameline was behind the theft of Falco's tama, showing that he does have a selfless side to him.

Sanga's tama is the ability to control ravens and presumably other avian creatures. He can also duck into the shadows, fitting for his team.

== Banner teams ==
=== Dragons ===
==== Ragno Garanthar ====
Ragno Garnathar (voiced by Joshua Collins) is the team leader and striker of the Dragons. Short tempered, classist, and determined, he runs the Dragons with an iron fist and is considered something of a dangerous individual who was suspended at one point. He is said to be the Dragon Striker, but Goyen Sugoi plans to replace him with Key. He considers him a nuisance and even put his life in danger to prove a point to him. He does seem to enjoy getting admirers however and is even willing to sign autographs. His tama is supposedly the Dragon tama, but his character card lists it as telekinesis. He can create gigantic physical forces of energy, which he chooses to do in the visage of a dragon.

==== Skadi Savarog ====
Skadi Savarog (voiced by Aimee-Ffion Edwards) is a midfielder for the Dragons. Reserved, yet respectable, she is the younger sister of Freki Savarog, who plays on the Shadows. She is an amputee, as she is missing an arm and has a metal canine-like leg. She apparently doubted herself and her abilities until she received help and support from Key during the banner trials. Since then, she has had deep respect and admiration for him and even jumped to his rescue at one point without hesitating. Her tama is cryokinesis and she can create giant walls of ice. She also uses her abilities to fashion an ice arm and leg to help her perform better. Her name and powers are a reference to Skaði, the Norse ice goddess.

- Timotheus "Behemoth" Bem - A large bulky boy with a spiked shell who, though tough, is also fairly respectful of other players. He is the Dragons' sweeper and his tama is the ability to create seismic waves that can alter the terrain.
- Ondine McKraken (voiced by Arina Ii) - A creepy young girl with a sarcastic and sinister personality. She is the Dragons' stopper and her tama is the ability to shoot water from her mouth and create geysers.
- Hilal Sarawi - A cautious and foreign sounding player. He is the Dragons' midfielder and his tama is the ability to create massive sand and windstorms.
- Anaïan "Anansi" Sillas - An tough player who wears goggles with three eyes on them. She is the Dragons' goalkeeper and her tama is to create webs. Her name and powers are a reference to Anansi the Akan spider god.

=== Bards ===
==== Casper and Callista Ferreiro ====
Casper and Callista Ferreiro (voiced by Stefan Trout and Díana Bermudez, respectively) are the co-team leaders and wingers of the Bards. The twins are known for their playful, yet antagonistic, attitude towards other players. They are also equally egotistical and consider themselves the best players on their team. Callista is shown to be the more maniacal of the two and most unrestrained, to the point that she can be murderous. Casper, while also malicious, is slightly more restrained and level headed. He is also the ex-boyfriend of Odward, whom he still has feelings for. Both their tamas are the ability to create magnetic fields, letting them draw and repel metal objects.

- Alvince "Snooker" Lumni - A large muscular player. He is the Bards' striker and his tama is the ability to create kinetic fields. He appears to close Sachama of the Roses.
- Eclair Ademor - A rabbit-like player. She is the Bards' sweeper and her tama is super speed.
- Baü Rimbe - The "rookie" of the team. He is the Bards' goalkeeper and his tama is soundwave generation.
- Tiffania "Bubble Tiff" Obolas - A snooty and conceited player. She is the Bards' sweeper and her tama can create bubble shields and traps.

=== Roses ===
==== Lilas Glasmearin ====
Lilas Glasmearin (voiced by Christine Allado) is the team leader and sweeper of the Roses. She is a sporty and domineering player who is gladly willing to take on any challenge given to her. She can be arrogant, but understands other players very well and is even willing to admit when someone is good. She is shown to be quite fond of Ssyelle, whom she admits would have been a terrific player for the Roses. She also cares deeply for her teammates and can get very aggressive with other players, especially when she assumed that Ameline was the reason for Falco's missing tama. Her tama is the ability to control vines.

==== Falco Sunspear ====
Falco Sunspear is a striker for the Roses. He is the nephew of the Bards' coach, Surya, whom he is implied to have a tumultuous relationship with, as well as his family in general. He is considered something of a star player and is well liked by many, considered the stand out of the new league players. Like the other players, he looked down on the Knights and Key in particular, whom he saw as "a lost cause", but quickly gained respect for him when he showed control of his tama. He had his tama drained by a mysterious entity. His tama was the ability to create blinding solar light, which he can manipulate in various ways.

- Lotus Daatura - A small mushroom like player. They are the Roses' goalkeeper and their tama is the ability to create hallucinatory smog.
- Tamara "Tammy" Oakenheart - A large muscular player. She is the Roses' stopper and her tama is to coat herself in oakwood armor.
- Beatrix D. "Rumble Bee" Rumble (voiced by Sarah Pitard) - A small and athletic player. She is the Roses' striker and her tama is to produce bee-like wings and fly.
- Dionysos "Dio" Pinecontis - A tall and limber player. He is the Roses' stopper and his tama can control tree sap.
- Sachama "Sacha" Curupira - A wild looking player with face paint and horns. He is the Roses' stopper and his tama can control tree roots. He appears to be close to Alvince of the Bards.

=== Shadows ===
==== Pregrina Freaks ====
Pregrina Freaks (voiced by Arina Ii) is the former team leader of the Shadows and the goalkeeper. She is a deviously macabre girl who enjoys frightening others, particularly Milo, whose fear of ghosts she likes to exploit. She was implied to have been a socially awkward young girl who, with the help of a diadem supplied to her by Goyen Sanga, gained better control over her tama and became the vicious player she is known as. Because of her ruthlessness, she does not seem to care much for her teammates and only sees them as playthings. Her tama is the ability to summon ghosts, which she can also use to possess her teammates.

- Conan Villani - A small, well-dressed, and grim speaking player. He is the Shadows' goalkeeper and acting team leader and his tama is precognition.
- Freki Savarog - A large animalistic player and Skadi's brother. He is the Shadows' striker and his tama is lycanthropy (werewolf).
- Kamoho "Kamo" Ali - A large savage player. She is the Shadows' midfielder and her tama is galeanthropy (wereshark).
- Kaiulani "Kai" Kahanamoku - A lesser known player. She is the Shadows' striker and her tama is mainly water based. She is named after Hawaiian icons Kaʻiulani and Duke Kahanamoku.
- Griffin Wells (voiced by Gregg Lowe) - A sneaky and gremlin like player. He is the Shadows' sweeper and his tama is invisibility. His name is a reference to the titular character of H. G. Wells novel The Invisible Man.
- Cleo Philopatra (voiced by Shala Nyx) - A gothic like player. She is the Shadows' stopper and her tama is to create mummy-like wrappings. Her name is a reference to famous Egyptian ruler Cleopatra.

== Other characters ==
- Dino Nagatatsu - Key's widowed father and a farmer. He is a very tough and principled man who often tries to keep his son out of trouble. It is heavily implied that he does not approve of Kal Asterock, but has connections to the people there. He knows about Edina's dangerous tama.
- Edina Nagatatsu - Key's mother, who was once the Dragon Striker. She was often regarded as the best, but was implied to be very dangerous as well. She apparently sacrificed herself to save the school from destruction that she apparently caused. Her tama was the Dragon tama.
- Mr. Tournefeuille - A local chef and Ssyelle's father. He is dramatic, over-the-top, and sensitive to his craft. He apparently dislikes Key.
- Caliban Ferreiro - A blacksmith living in Mestras and the father of twins Casper and Callista. He is widely regarded as the best smithy around and his shop has a giant factory in the back. He is a jovial man, but takes his work seriously.
- Brunelca Ostercrumble (voiced by Sarah Pitard) - An overly excited girl who is a big fan of Gorotama players and asks for autographs. She initially did not care for Key, but after the Knights won their first game, she became a fan and started a fan club called the Squires. Her tama is the ability to change her hair color.
- Nurse Volgora (voiced by Ellen Thomas) - A kindly, yet eccentric nurse who is willing to try anything when curing her students. Despite this, she is well-educated and seems to know her stuff, even though her remedies are seen as questionable.
- Ralfio - A young boy who apparently suffers from a queasy stomach and is constantly throwing up. His tama is the ability to create color powder similar to Holi. His name is a pun on an alternate word for vomiting, "to ralph".
