= List of Good Trouble characters =

The following is a list of fictional characters who appear in the Freeform drama series Good Trouble (2019–2024).

== Overview ==
Main cast of Good Trouble
Actor	Character	Season				
Actor	Character	Season 1	Season 2	Season 3	Season 4	Season 5
Main characters
Maia Mitchell	Callie Adams Foster	Main (Note: In season four, Mitchell is only credited in the first two episodes and episode six.)	Main	Main	Main	Special Guest (Note: Mitchell is credited as a special guest star in a recurring capacity.)
Cierra Ramirez	Mariana Adams Foster	Main	Main	Main	Main	Main
Zuri Adele	Malika Williams	Main	Main	Main	Main	Main
Sherry Cola	Alice Kwan	Main	Main	Main	Main	Main
Tommy Martinez	Gael Martinez	Main	Main	Main	Main	Main
Roger Bart	Curtis Wilson	Main	Main	Guest		
Emma Hunton	Davia Moss	Recurring	Main	Main	Main	Main
Josh Pence	Dennis Cooper	Recurring	Main	Main	Main	Main
Beau Mirchoff	Jamie Hunter	Recurring	Recurring	Main (Note: In season four, Mirchoff is credit only in the first two episodes.)	Main	Guest
Bryan Craig	Joaquin Peréz				Main	Main
Priscilla Quintana	Isabella Tavez		Recurring	Recurring	Main	Guest
Booboo Stewart	Luca Ryusaki				Recurring	Main
Recurring characters
Molly McCook	Rebecca	Recurring				
Ken Kirby	Benjamin	Recurring	Recurring	Guest		
Dustin Ingram	Alex Wood	Recurring	Recurring	Guest		
Dhruv Uday Singh	Raj Patil	Recurring	Recurring	Recurring		
Max Cutler	Sam Higgins	Recurring	Recurring	Guest		
Michael Galante	Bryan	Recurring				
Chloe Wepper	Casey Pierce	Recurring	Recurring			
Heather Mazur	Angela Miller	Recurring	Recurring			
Charlie Bodin	Josh Mandela	Recurring				
Nicki Micheaux	Sandra Thompson	Recurring	Guest			
Kara Wang	Sumi Liu	Recurring	Recurring	Recurring	Recurring	Recurring
TJ Linnard	Evan Speck	Recurring	Recurring	Recurring	Recurring	Recurring
Briana Venskus	Meera Mattei	Recurring	Guest			
Daisy Eagan	Joey Riverton	Recurring	Recurring			
Sarunas J. Jackson	Isaac Hall	Recurring	Recurring	Recurring	Guest	Guest
J. Mallory McCree	Dom Williams	Recurring	Recurring	Guest		Guest
Dianne Doan	Kate Nguyen	Recurring				
Chris Sheffield	Jeff Maxwell	Recurring	Guest			
Anastasia Leddick	Kelly Campbell	Recurring	Recurring	Recurring	Recurring	Recurring
Maisie Klompus	Rachel Boyle	Recurring	Recurring	Recurring	Recurring	Recurring
Seri DeYoung	Claire Badgley	Recurring	Recurring	Recurring	Recurring	Recurring
Rachel Rosenbloom	Gina Spero	Recurring	Recurring	Recurring	Recurring	Recurring
Alex Fernandez	Hugo Martinez		Recurring		Guest	Guest
Ruth Zalduondo	Adriana Martinez		Recurring	Recurring	Guest	Guest
Denim Richards	Elijah Adrieux		Recurring			
Juan Antonio	Marcus		Recurring			
Lisandra Tena	Teresa		Recurring			
Amin El Gamal	Cary Plack		Recurring			
Nicole Lynn Evans	Gwen Tuckerman		Recurring			
Richard Brooks	Joseph Turner		Recurring			
Melina Abdullah	Herself		Recurring			
Jojo T. Gibbs	Fundraiser Guest		Recurring			
Caitlin Kimball	Sydney		Recurring			
Zsane Jhe	Tiana		Recurring			
River Butcher	LB Brady		Recurring	Recurring	Guest	
Patrisse Cullors	Herself	Guest	Recurring	Guest		
Azita Ghanizada	Kendra Zahir		Recurring			
Shawntay Dalton	Lisa		Recurring			
Presliah Nunez	Sariya		Recurring			
Constance Zimmer	Kathleen Gale			Recurring	Guest	
Jayson Blair	Tony Britton			Recurring		
Marcus Emanuel Mitchell	Dyonte Davis			Recurring	Recurring	
Terrell Ransome Jr.	Andre Johnson		Guest	Recurring	Guest	
Craig Parker	George Yuri Ellwin			Recurring	Recurring	Guest
Erik Stocklin	Matt Gordon			Recurring	Guest	
Stephen Guarino	Scott Farrell			Recurring		
Shannon Chan-Kent	Ruby Chen			Recurring		
Aisha Alfa	Jordan			Recurring		
Chris L. McKenna	Marc Rothman			Recurring		
Marissa Rivera	Magdalena Calderón			Recurring	Guest	
Nabeel Muscatwalla	Derek Payden			Recurring	Guest	
Zainne Saleh	Sanjana Shan			Recurring		
Nicole Dele	Stacey Quarren			Recurring		
Kye Tamm	Shaun			Recurring		
Catherine Haena Kim	Nicolette Baptiste			Recurring		
Mark Adair-Rios	Martin Gutierrez			Recurring		
Dinora Walcott	Imani Lytell			Recurring		
Stephen Oyoung	Ken Sung			Recurring	Guest	
Jennifer Jalene	Julia Sung			Recurring	Guest	
Kevin David Lin	Tommy Sung			Recurring	Guest	
Peyton Woolf	Katie Parker			Recurring		
Tim Martin Gleason	Dan Soloman			Recurring		
Emmett Preciado	Rowan Albarran			Recurring	Guest	
Tiffany Dupont	Jackie Morton			Recurring	Guest	
Odelya Halevi	Angelica Sofer			Recurring		
Yasmine Aker	Angelica Sofer				Recurring	Guest
Liisi LaFontaine	Tanya Martin			Recurring		
Nicole Maines	Liza Davis				Recurring	
Malaya Rivera Drew	Lucia Morales			Guest	Recurring	Recurring
Izzy Diaz	Will				Recurring	Guest
Marisela Zumbado	Tracey				Recurring	Guest
Maiara Walsh	Jenna Peréz				Recurring	Recurring
Brooke Nevin	Ryan Jones				Recurring	Guest
Michael Cassidy	Asher Bowen				Recurring	
Jesse Berry	Elliot Bowen				Recurring	Guest
Graham Sibley	Silas Thompson				Recurring	Recurring
Gabriel Tigerman	Dylan Almendros					Recurring
Hailie Sahar	Jazmin Martinez	Guest	Guest	Guest	Guest	Recurring
Joseph Piccuirro	Spencer			Guest	Guest	Recurring
Miguel Pinzon	Ethan					Recurring
Sunkrish Bala	Ranjit					Recurring
Myko Olivier	Tyler Banks					Recurring
David Terry	Brayden					Recurring
Garrett M. Brown	Murray					Recurring
Alan Blumenfeld	Morris					Recurring
Joel Brooks	Morty					Recurring
Tetona Jackson	Mabel					Recurring
Zane Philips	Jay					Recurring
Carina Conti	Riley					Recurring

== Main ==
=== Callie Adams Foster ===
Callie Adams Foster (portrayed by Maia Mitchell; seasons 1–4), is a recent graduate of UCSD Law School and Mariana's adopted sister.

She leaves to join the ACLU in Washington, D.C., in the second episode of season 4, though she has spoken to Mariana occasionally through web chat.

Callie returned to the Coiterie in season five to support Mariana after Evan was shot by Silas Thompson's minion Adam and give her advice when she is made the acting CEO of Speckulate. A flashback revealed that Jamie has proposed to her. Callie then accompanied her mothers and Jamie in attending a Coiterie Thanksgiving. She accepts Jamie's marriage proposal.

=== Mariana Adams Foster ===
Mariana Adams Foster (portrayed by Cierra Ramirez) is a software engineer and Callie's adopted sister who recently graduated from MIT.

=== Malika Williams ===
Malika Williams (portrayed by Zuri Adele) is a bartender and political activist who lives with Callie and Mariana in the Coterie.

=== Alice Kwan ===
Alice Kwan (portrayed by Sherry Cola) is the building manager of The Coterie apartment building.

=== Gael Martinez ===
Gael Martinez (portrayed by Tommy Martinez) is a bisexual graphic designer and artist who falls for Callie.

=== Judge Curtis Wilson ===
Judge Curtis Wilson (portrayed by Roger Bart; seasons 1–2, guest season 3) is a conservative judge for whom Callie worked as a clerk.

=== Davia Moss ===
Davia Moss (portrayed by Emma Hunton; season 2–present, recurring season 1) is a body-positive influencer and teacher.

=== Dennis Cooper ===
Dennis Cooper (portrayed by Josh Pence; season 2–present, recurring season 1) is the oldest tenant in the Coterie who is an aspiring musician.

=== Jamie Hunter ===
Jamie Hunter (portrayed by Beau Mirchoff; seasons 3–4, recurring seasons 1–2) is a lawyer and Callie's on-again-off-again boyfriend.

In season five, Jamie had proposed to Callie in a flashback. During the Coterie Thanksgiving dinner, Callie accepted Jamie's proposal.

=== Joaquin Peréz ===
Joaquin Peréz (portrayed by Bryan Craig; season 4) is a mysterious new resident to the Coterie and investigative journalist who is looking for his estranged sister Jenna.

=== Isabella Tavez ===
Isabella Tavez (portrayed by Priscilla Quintana as Isabella Tavez; season 4, recurring seasons 2–3) is an aspiring actress and model

=== Luca Ryusaki ===
Luca Ryusaki (portrayed by Booboo Stewart; season 5, recurring season 4) is a homeless man whom Joaquin interviews for a story and is befriended by The Coterie inhabitants.

== Recurring ==
=== Rebecca ===
Rebecca (portrayed by Molly McCook; season 1) is a clerk for Judge Wilson.

=== Benjamin ===
Benjamin (portrayed by Ken Kirby; seasons 1–2, guest season 3), another clerk for Judge Wilson

=== Alex Wood ===
Alex Wood (portrayed by Dustin Ingram; seasons 1-2, guest season 3) is Mariana's co-worker at Speckulate.

=== Raj Patil ===
Raj Patil (portrayed by Dhruv Uday Singh; seasons 1-3; guest season 5) is Mariana's co-worker at Speckulate and later boyfriend.

=== Sam Higgins ===
Sam Higgins (portrayed by Max Cutler; seasons 1-2, guest season 3) is Mariana's co-worker at Speckulate.

=== Bryan ===
Bryan (portrayed by Michael Galante; season 1) is an event planner at the Standard Hotel who is gay.

=== Casey Pierce ===
Casey Pierce (portrayed by Chloe Wepper; seasons 1-2) is a software engineer at Speckulate.

=== Angela Miller ===
Angela Miller (portrayed by Heather Mazur; seasons 1–2) is the head of HR at Speckulate.

=== Josh Mandela ===
Josh Mandela (portrayed by Charlie Bodin; season 1) is a sexist.

=== Sandra Thompson ===
Sandra Thompson (portrayed by Nicki Micheaux; season 1, guest season 2) is a political activist.

=== Sumi Liu ===
Sumi Liu (portrayed by Kara Wang; seasons 1-4) is Alice's ex-girlfriend and now best friend.

=== Evan Speck ===
Evan Speck (portrayed by TJ Linnard; seasons 1-5) is Mariana's boss and the CEO of Speckulate. He later becomes one of Mariana’s main love interests.

=== Meera Mattei ===
Meera Mattei (portrayed by Briana Venskus); season 1, guest season 2) is Sumi's former fiancée.

=== Joey Riverton ===
Joey Riverton (portrayed by Daisy Eagan; seasons 1–2) is Alice's love interest.

=== Isaac Hall ===
Isaac Hall (portrayed by Sarunas J. Jackson; seasons 1-3, guest season 4) is a former professional basketball player and Malika's boyfriend.

=== Dom Williams ===
Dom Williams (portrayed by J. Mallory McCree; seasons 1-2, guest season 3) is Malika's brother.

=== Kate Nguyen ===
Kate Nguyen (portrayed by Dianne Doan; season 1) is a judicial clerk for Judge Wilson.

=== Jeff Maxwell ===
Jeff Maxwell (portrayed by Chris Sheffield; season 1, guest season 2) is a businessman. He is the ex-boyfriend of Davia Moss and the estranged husband of Lily.

=== Kelly Campbell ===
Kelly Campbell (portrayed by Anastasia Leddick; season 1-4, guest season 5) is a resident at The Coterie and former member of Dennis' improv group.

=== Rachel Boyle ===
Rachel Boyle (portrayed by Maisie Klompus; seasons 1-4) is Marianna's friend and business partner for Bulk Beauty.

=== Claire Badgley ===
Claire Badgley (portrayed by Seri DeYoung; seasons 1-4) is Marianna's friend and business partner for Bulk Beauty and Raj's new girlfriend.

=== Gina Spero ===
Gina Spero (portrayed by Rachel Rosenbloom; seasons 1-4) is Marianna's friend and business partner for Bulk Beauty.

=== Elijah Adrieux ===
Elijah Adrieux (portrayed by Denim Richards; season 2) is Gael's first love.

=== Marcus ===
Marcus (portrayed by Juan Antonio; season 2) is a lawyer at Legal Aid.

=== Teresa ===
Teresa (portrayed by Lisandra Tena; season 2) is a lawyer at Legal Aid.

=== Cary Plack ===
Cary Plack (portrayed by Amin El Gamal; season 2) is a research assistant at Legal Aid.

=== Gwen Tuckerman ===
Gwen Tuckerman (portrayed by Nicole Lynn Evans; season 2), a research assistant at Legal Aid.

=== Joseph Turner ===
Joseph Turner (portrayed by Richard Brooks; season 2) is the father of Malika.

=== Melina Abdullah ===
Melina Abdullah (portrayed by Herself; season 2) is an actress and Black Lives Matter activist.

=== Sydney ===
Sydney (portrayed by Caitlin Kimball; season 2)

=== Tiana ===
Tiana (portrayed by Zsane Jhe; season 2)

=== LB Brady ===
LB Brady (portrayed by River Butcher; seasons 2-3, guest season 4) is Sumi's love interest.

=== Patrisse Cullors ===
Patrisse Cullors as (portrayed by Herself; season 2, guest seasons 1, 3) is a Black Lives Matter activist.

=== Kendra Zahir ===
Kendra Zahir (portrayed by Azita Ghanizada; season 2) is the COO of Spekulate.

=== Lisa ===
Lisa (portrayed by Shawntay Dalton; season 2) is a single mother

=== Sariya ===
Sariya (portrayed by Presliah Nunez; season 2)

=== Hugo Martinez ===
Hugo Martinez (portrayed by Alex Fernandez; season 2) is the father of Gael.

=== Kathleen Gale ===
Kathleen Gale (portrayed by Constance Zimmer; season 3, guest season 4) is an intimidating defense attorney who becomes Callie's boss and mentor while being investigated by the FBI for her connection with Albert Chen.

=== Tony Britton ===
Tony Britton (portrayed by Jason Blair; season 3) is a charismatic lawyer who works for Kathleen

=== Dyonte Davis ===
Dyonte Davis (portrayed by Marcus Emanuel Mitchell; seasons 3-4) is a fellow intern at the non-profit that Malika works at.

=== Andre Johnson ===
Andre Johnson (portrayed by Terrel Ransom Jr.; season 3, guest seasons 2, 4) is a student that attends Diane Hash Elementary.

=== George Yuri Ellwin ===
George Yuri Ellwin (portrayed by Craig Parker; seasons 3-4) is a high-profile artist.

=== Matt Gordon ===
Matt Gordon (portrayed by Erik Stocklin; season 3, guest season 4) is a fellow teacher and friend of Davia.

=== Scott Farrell ===
Scott Farrell (portrayed by Stephen Guarino; season 3)

=== Ruby Chen ===
Ruby Chen (portrayed by Shannon Chan-Kent; season 3) is a lesbian who works for BTV as a scout.

=== Jordan ===
Jordan (portrayed by Aisha Alfa; season 3)

=== Marc Rothman ===
Marc Rothman (portrayed by Chris L. McKenna; season 3)

=== Magdalena Calderón ===
Magdalena Calderón (portrayed by Marissa Rivera; season 3, guest season 4)

=== Derek Payden ===
Derek Payden (portrayed by Nabeel Muscatwalla; season 3, guest season 4)

=== Sanjana Shan ===
Sanjana Shan (portrayed by Zainne Seleh; season 3)

=== Stacey Quarren ===
Stacey Quarren (portrayed by Nicole Dele; season 3)

=== Shaun ===
Shaun (portrayed by Kyle Tamm; season 3)

=== Nicolette Baptiste ===
Nicolette Baptiste (portrayed by Catherine Haena Kim; season 3) is a kind yet fierce attorney that becomes Callie's rival

=== Martin Gutierrez ===
Martin Gutierrez (Mark Adair-Rios; season 3)

=== Imani Lytell ===
Imani Lytell (portrayed by Dinora Walcott; season 3) is the manager of DPN.

=== Ken Sung ===
Ken Sung (portrayed by Stephen Oyoung; season 3, guest season 4) is Kathleen's client.

=== Julia Sung ===
Julia Sung (portrayed by Jennifer Jalene; season 3, guest season 4) is Ken's wife.

=== Tommy Sung ===
Tommy Sung (Kevin David; season 3, guest season 4), Ken and Julia's son who is on trial for the murder of his best friend.

=== Katie Parker ===
Katie Parker (portrayed by Peyton Woolf; season 3)

=== Dan Soloman ===
Dan Soloman (portrayed by Tim Martin Gleason; season 3)

=== Rowan Albarran ===
Rowan Albarran (portrayed by Emmett Preciado; season 3, guest season 4) is a lawyer who works for Kathleen Gale.

=== Jackie Morton ===
Jackie Morton (portrayed by Tiffany Dupont; season 3, guest season 4)

=== Angelica Sofer ===
Angelica Sofer (portrayed by Odelya Halevi; season 3) and Yasmine Aker (season 4-5) is a queer waitress at Duoro.

=== Tanya Martin ===
Tanya Martin (portrayed by Liisi LaFontaine; season 3) is the girlfriend of Dyone Davis.

=== Liza Davis ===
Liza Davis (portrayed by Nicole Maines; season 4), the project supervisor at Revitalize Beauty.

=== Lucia Morales ===
Lucia Morales (portrayed by Malaya Rivera Drew; season 4, guest season 3) is a city councilwoman who Malika works for.

=== Will ===
Will (portrayed by Izzy Diaz; season 4)

=== Tracey ===
Tracey (portrayed by Marisela Zumbado; season 4)

=== Jenna Peréz ===
Jenna Peréz (portrayed by Maiara Walsh; season 4) is the estranged sister of Joaquin.

=== Ryan Jones ===
Ryan Jones (portrayed by Brooke Nevin; season 4)

=== Asher Bowen ===
Asher Bowen (portrayed by Michael Cassidy; season 4)

=== Elliot Bowen ===
Elliot Bowen (portrayed by Jesse Berry; season 4)

=== Silas Thompson ===
Born Gary Brecker, Silas Thompson (portrayed by Graham Sibley; season 4-5) is a man who was arrested for filing fake health insurance claims. After serving time, he has become a cult leader who Jenna has fallen in with while using a farm as a front for his activities. When Adam pointed his shotgun at a fleeing Marianna, Joaquin, and Jenna, Silas tried to stop him.

In season five, Silas and Adam were brought in by the police. He avoided arrest by stating that Adam disobeyed his orders not to fire his shotgun. Marianna and Joaquin still plan to find a way to bring Silas to justice. Silas later snuck into the Coterie and carefully got information from Mariana's room while also stealing the doll of Callie. Joaquin's police contact later dusted for finger prints and eventually found them by the fire escape. Callie later visited Silas and gave him a restraining order to stay away from Marianna as he claims that he was not responsible for the disappearance of a former worker on his farm. Callie warns him that she will have him arrested if he violates the restraining order.

==== Adam ====
Adam (portrayed by Jake Richardson; season 4-5) is a member of Silas' cult who is loyal to Silas and keeps an eye on Jenna. When Joaquin and Marianna managed to work on rescue Jenna, Adam tried to shoot them against Silas' orders.

The opening of season five revealed that the bullet from Adam's gun struck Evan when the bullet passed by Mariana. Adam was later arrested for attempted murder while Silas avoided arrest by stating that Adam disobeyed his orders not to use his shotgun.

== Notable guest stars ==
- Hailie Sahar as Jazmin Martinez (seasons 1-5), Gael's sister
- Megan West as Eliza Foster (seasons 2-3), Brandon's wife and Jamie's sister
- Margaret Cho as Herself (season 3)
- Philip Anthony-Rodriguez as Marc Tavez (season 4), the father of Isabella

=== Reprised roles from The Fosters ===
The following reprised their roles from The Fosters:

- Hayden Byerly as Jude Adams Foster (special guest seasons 1-5), Callie's half-brother and the youngest adopted sibling of Mariana
- Teri Polo as Stef Adams Foster (special guest seasons 1-5), the adoptive mother of Callie and Mariana
- Sherri Saum as Lena Adams Foster (special guest seasons 1-5), the adoptive mother of Callie and Mariana
- Noah Centineo as Jesus Adams Foster (special guest seasons 1-2), Mariana's twin brother and adopted brother of Callie
- David Lambert as Brandon Foster (special guest seasons 1-3, 5), the adoptive sibling of Mariana and Callie
- Robert Gant as Jim Hunter (seasons 2-3, 5), Jamie and Eliza's father and Brandon's father in-law
- Susan Walters as Diane Hunter (seasons 2-3, 5), Jamie and Eliza's mother and Brandon's mother in-law
- Amanda Leighton as Emma Kurtzman (guest season 2), Jesus' fiance
- Gavin MacIntosh as Connor Stevens (guest season 3), Jude's childhood boyfriend
- Bailee Madison as Sophia Quinn (guest Season 5), Sophia is Callie's biological younger half-sister.
