= Spilt Milk =

Spilt Milk, a play on the idiom there's no point crying over spilt milk, may refer to:

== Film and television ==
- Spilt Milk (film), a 2024 Irish film directed by Brian Durnin
- Spilt Milk, a 2010 film starring Jake Johnson
- Spilt Milk, a 2019 film starring Zuri Adele
- "Spilt Milk" (American Horror Story), a 2013 TV episode

== Literature ==
- Spilt Milk (novel), by Chico Buarque, 2009

== Music ==
- Spilt Milk (festival), held in Canberra, Australia
- Spilt Milk (Jellyfish album), 1993
- Spilt Milk (Kristina Train album) or the title song, 2009
- Spilt Milk, an album by Laurie Styvers, 1972
- "Spilt Milk", a song by the Cure from Bloodflowers, 2000

== See also ==
- "Spilled Milk", a 2021 episode of The Good Doctor
