= The Halcyon =

- Genre: Drama
- Created by: Charlotte Jones
- Written by: Charlotte Jones; Jack Lothian; Martha Hillier; Sarah Dollard
- Directed by: Stephen Woolfenden; Rob Evans; Justin Hardy; Philip John
- Composer: Samuel Sim
- Country of origin: United Kingdom
- Original language: English
- No. of series: 1
- No. of episodes: 8

Production
- Executive producers: Sharon Hughff; Jack Lothian; Andy Harries
- Producer: Chris Croucher
- Production locations: London, England
- Editors: Crispin Green; Dominic Strevens; Paul Endacott
- Running time: 47–48 minutes
- Production company: Left Bank Pictures

Original release
- Network: ITV
- Release: 2 January – 20 February 2017

The Halcyon is a British television period drama broadcast on ITV which began airing on 2 January 2017. It was created and written by Charlotte Jones. The series focused on examining World War II London from 'a new perspective', and was set in 1940 at a five-star hotel "at the centre of London Society and a world at war", aiming to show London life "through the prism of war and the impact it has on families, politics, relationships and work across every social strata." Steven Mackintosh and Olivia Williams play major roles. The first episode was broadcast on 2 January 2017, and the series concluded on 20 February 2017.

The show was cancelled after one series.

== Production ==
The Halcyon was first announced on 3 December 2015. It was commissioned by ITV's Director of Drama Steve November and Controller of Drama Victoria Fea. The show was produced by Chris Croucher, executive produced by Sharon Hughff, Jack Lothian (also lead series writer) and Andy Harries. Left Bank Pictures were the production company of the series.

Croucher called The Halcyon "a similar beast" to Downton Abbey, although Left Bank Pictures founder and managing director Marigo Kehoe explained that the show had been in development "for a long time", and the development of the show came at a time when "new ideas were needed". Producer Chris Croucher added that "Downton has a serenity to it, but the modern world is arriving in The Halcyon", as well as revealing The Halcyon's dialogue "is more punchy" and that the show "has more energy". Radio Times wrote that The Halcyon has a "little bit of Downton Abbey and a little bit of Mr Selfridge in the mix".

The cast consists of about twenty main characters. The cast was officially announced on 4 April 2016, with the news that Olivia Williams and Steven Mackintosh would star in The Halcyon. Williams commented on her character, stating that Lady Hamilton is "a trope, but wonderful to play" before adding that her character is also "an inherited aristocrat with a sharp wit who is racist, classist, homophobic...Everything you'd want her to be, to be truly hateful!". Mackintosh revealed his character as "interesting", and that "on first impressions, you might think the surface is all there is". Tointon said of her casting that "it's a lovely compliment". She also stated The Halcyon cast will be a "sexier Downton".

A cover of the song "Marvellous Party" performed by UK soul singer Beverley Knight was released as part of the series' soundtrack.

In her nude bathtub scene, Kara Tointon didn't request a body double.

== Location ==
The Halcyon was filmed in West London Film Studios. The exterior of the set was provided by 32 Lincoln's Inn Fields in Central London, the former Land Registry Building now owned by The London School of Economics, while further outdoor scenes were shot at Spa Fields. Further locations include Serle Street and Portugal Street, two areas around Lincoln's Inn Fields. The hotel's basement was filmed at the House of Detention in Clerkenwell's Sans Walk. The Chatham Historic Dockyard in Kent was used in episodes 5 and 6 for scenes depicting bombed London streets.

== Cast ==
=== Main cast ===
- Annabelle Apsion as Lillian Hobbs, housekeeper
- Mark Benton as Dennis Feldman, head concierge
- Jamie Blackley as Lord Freddie Hamilton, a newly qualified RAF fighter pilot who inherits The Halcyon
- Edward Bluemel as the Honourable Toby Hamilton, Freddie's twin brother, university researcher, later civil servant
- Alex Boxall as Tom Hill, waiter
- Nick Brimble as Skinner, doorman
- Michael Carter as Wilfred Reynolds, reception manager
- Lauren Coe as Kate Loughlin, chambermaid
- Hermione Corfield as Emma Garland, receptionist, later assistant manager, Richard's daughter
- Sope Dirisu as Sonny Sullivan, West Indian bandleader and pianist
- Kevin Eldon as George Parry, head chef
- Gordon Kennedy as Robbie, chef
- Akshay Kumar as Adil Joshi, barman
- Ewan Mitchell as Billy Taylor, bellboy, Peggy's son
- Nico Rogner as Max Klein, kitchen porter and later sous chef, Austrian Jewish refugee
- Matt Ryan as Joe O'Hara, American radio correspondent and hotel guest
- Kara Tointon as Betsey Day, singer
- Charity Wakefield as Charity Lambert, Lord Hamilton's mistress and Nazi sympathiser
- Liz White as Peggy Taylor, telephonist
- Steven Mackintosh as Richard Garland, general manager
- Olivia Williams as Priscilla Hamilton, Lady Hamilton
- Charles Edwards as Lucian D'Abberville, Lady Hamilton's new amour, (mercenary) German spy

=== Guest stars ===
- Jamie Cullum as Club Singer
- Eric Godon as the Comte De St Claire, French refugee and hotel guest
- Alex Jennings as Laurence Hamilton, Lord Hamilton, hotel owner and politician, dies in first episode
- Beverley Knight as Ruby, singer
- Danny Webb as Mortimer, Special Branch officer

=== Supporting cast ===
- Doug Allen as Jim Taylor, Peggy's husband
- Jonathan Aris as Asper, German spy
- Geoffrey McGivern as Lord Ambrose, politician and former friend of Lord Hamilton
- Matthew Marsh as Delane, O'Hara's boss
- Maggie O'Neill as Gloria, Betsey's mother
- Tim Plester as Douglas, wartime acquaintance of Richard Garland
- Sophie Stanton as Evelyn, WVS ambulance driver

== Episodes ==
No.	Title	Directed by	Written by	Original release date	UK viewers (millions)
1	"Episode 1"	Stephen Woolfenden	Jack Lothian and Charlotte Jones	2 January 2017	7.28
May 1940:- At the Halcyon hotel in London discreet manager Richard Garland turns a blind eye when the promiscuous owner Lord Hamilton smuggles in his flighty mistress Charity Lambert to sit in on a secret meeting of the appeasement party. When his wife Lady Hamilton arrives unexpectedly Richard and his receptionist daughter Emma, assisted by housekeeper Lilian and porter Feldman, act quickly to prevent her from catching the couple together. Emma is mutually attracted to RAF pilot Freddie, the Hamiltons' elder son who turns up with researcher brother Toby but Betsey, the out-spoken dance band singer, warns Emma that Freddie is out of her league. At a party for Freddie his father's indiscretions are common knowledge with the staff and Lady Hamilton despite the pair putting up a united front. They are all observed by American journalist Joe O'Hara, whose plan to expose Hamilton's political stance in a broadcast home leads to disaster.
2	"Episode 2"	Stephen Woolfenden	Jack Lothian and Charlotte Jones	9 January 2017	6.16
May 1940:- After Lord Hamilton's death, his eldest son Freddie becomes the new lord, but refuses to take charge of the hotel, having already committed to the RAF, yet his mother doesn't know how to do it, forcing her to put the last person she wants, Richard, in charge. Meanwhile the kitchen gets a new employee named Max Klein, an Austrian refugee, but head chef George Perry treats him like a German and is resentful (he even imprisoned Max in the freezer at one point). Betsey tries to get Emma and Freddie together, but they fall out when Freddie spilled that he was forced to fire Emma's father at Priscilla's request. Richard, in an attempt to find another job, steals some money from the hotel's safe and tries to gamble with it to get more, but has second thoughts after Dennis stops him (though Richard wins anyway). Charity finds herself in trouble due to her German sympathies, so Richard warns her to go into hiding, then returns the money he took to Freddie, though he insists Richard keep said money. In the end, Richard is kept and becomes the new manager, his daughter gets promoted to assistant manager, and she and Freddie are officially in a relationship.
3	"Episode 3"	Rob Evans	Jack Lothian	16 January 2017	6.05
June 1940:- French people start piling in England, one being Count Comte De St Claire and his assistant Lucian D'Abberville. It was also Billy's eighteenth birthday, where he could finally apply for the war effort, specifically the artillery (which he didn't want), unfortunately he also steals the count's golden-gun, which is his family heirloom. George racially accuses Max of it, although he didn't steal the gun, but he did steal the Hamilton family's couplings with the intent to get his family out of France with them. This gets him arrested, and only Emma and Joe are willing to help him. Toby has applied to the war-office while Kate finds out about the count's gun and tries to cheer up the count himself, but he ruins it by forcefully trying to kiss her, which provokes Billy. Lucian tries to compensate to Kate with an envelope with money, but she rejects it, and Billy gets into a fight with Comte, as well as returns the gun and comes clean to everyone else, not that this doesn't get him into trouble. Lucian even quits serving Comte to be with Lady Hamilton, who also takes pity on Max via persuasion from Emma and gets him back in the hotel's kitchen, much to George's dismay, and his racism becomes too burdening to be allowed to fester anymore, forcing Emma to fire him and replace him with Robbie. Finally, Richard finds out about Emma and Freddie being together.
4	"Episode 4"	Rob Evans	Jack Lothian and Martha Hillier	23 January 2017	5.92
August 1940:- As the war continues, a plane in 392 Squadron (which Freddie is serving in) is shot down and Toby breaks the news to everyone else, though Freddie turns up alive – the one shot down was a Polish man named Stanislav Radimsky, but as Emma and Freddie get closer Richard worries she'll be heartbroken. At the same time Betsey's mother Gloria pays a visit, but Sonny doesn't find her to be a good parent as she tends to act before thinking and conceived Betsey by accident. Various Americans flee back to their country, although Joe is being sent there for a new show, but he feels his boss Delane is being apathetic toward the British, and after Stanislav's death decides to stay in England. Lucian tries to get Priscilla to get out more, starting with a movie-theater, but this backfires when some of her employees, who happen to be there too, look at her. Luckily, she gets over it and tries to bond with them even. Sonny pawns his father's trumpet to give money to Gloria so she can get back on her feet, and she and Betsey start rekindling.
5	"Episode 5"	Justin Hardy	Jack Lothian and Charlotte Jones	30 January 2017	5.69
September 1940:- A wedding is held at the hotel between the Ashworth family while Richard is given the day off with Peggy, but unfortunately, he runs into a man from his past, and we learn that Richard used to serve in the army, but the other man was about to be executed for cowardice, only for Richard to kill the executioner and that "Richard Garland" isn't even his real name, it's "Sam Green". Priscilla tries to set up Toby with Lady Teresa, much to his chagrin, while Freddie is worried that the possibility of dying will devastate Emma and decides to break up with her, though she doesn't take it well. Trouble comes when German fighters and bombers are seen flying over the city and ravage it. The wedding is moved to the hotel's basement, but Robbie and Max remain in the kitchen to finish the wedding cake and Robbie reveals he used to be a sailor, and the sole survivor of his assigned ship. Richard and Peggy brave the barrage to save the former's daughter Dora: the house is destroyed and the neighbor Ada killed, but Dora survived. Betsey discovers that Sonny pawned the trumpet for her mother in the previous episode, causing their friendship to strain, Thankfully the danger passes, the hotel escapes unscathed and the wedding is a success, additionally Toby and Adil begin to bond with the implication they're gay.
6	"Episode 6"	Justin Hardy	Sarah Dollard	6 February 2017	5.55
October 1940:- Emma has joined the Woman's Voluntary Service, though Richard is worried it will kill her. Billy returns on leave and begins a relationship with Kate. Joe interviews the rescuers cleaning up the damage from the previous episode, but when another air raid arrives takes part in the work with Emma, where they find an injured woman with her dead mother. Sonny and Betsey stay in the bar during the air raid due to their fallout but make amends in the end. Once again, the hotel is spared, but tragically Billy wasn't as lucky due to a parachute mine getting him. Lucian finds Toby and Adil getting flirty with each other, but at first keeps it to himself, only to use it to his advantage into bribing Adil (along with knowing about his personal life) into being a pawn in some twisted game.
7	"Episode 7"	Philip John	Martha Hillier and Jack Lothian	13 February 2017	5.74
November 1940:- Due to a lot of paperwork, Toby decided to bring some to the hotel to continue it, but in doing so, Adil steals them for Lucian. It doesn't go unnoticed though as Toby's boss Mortimer discovers the espionage and assumes Toby is a traitor. Betsey suddenly finds herself being romantically pursued by a man named Wilson, becoming competition to Sonny. Freddie begins to regret dumping Emma, but she starts to hang out with Joe and they start getting close, unwittingly creating a love-triangle. Richard suggests Freddie try to ask his father's ex-friend Lord Ambrose to help clear Toby's name, and they succeed, but Toby himself confronts Adil and discovers how Lucian has dirt on him, but is unable to stop it, and worse, Lucian and Priscilla are engaged to be married.
8	"Episode 8"	Philip John	Jack Lothian	20 February 2017	5.63
December 1940:- The hotel's fiftieth anniversary has arrived, and a party is in the making. Richard's army friend stops by to ask for a job, but is turned away. Lucian, seeing an opportunity to get more dirt on another pawn, quickly talks to him. Max's family is found and they reunite. Emma and Freddie get back together and Joe doesn't dare compete. A desperate Toby reveals Lucian's true colors to Richard, who quickly tries to warn Priscilla, but she is skeptical and assumes Toby is just resentful. Nevertheless she tries to find out for herself and discovers his passport and travel-ticket to Germany, proving her otherwise. Lucian catches her and tries to play coy, but she doesn't fall for it, tears up the passport and ticket to shreds and tries to call the cops. Lucian stops and tries to use her as leverage, but she accidentally kills him. Luckily Richard comes to her aid. Adil feels so guilty (coupled with being hated by Toby now) that he tries to commit suicide, but Toby doesn't want him dead and saves him in the nick of time. Another air raid shows up during the celebration, but everyone decides to stay for five minutes before taking shelter, which becomes a mistake as a bomb hits the hotel, obliterating a section of it and killing a few people, plus wounding several like Betsey, though it also did Priscilla and Richard a favor by vaporizing Lucian's corpse and destroying all traces of their incident, but the future of the hotel and its workers remain uncertain.
