= Pandora (TV series) =

2019 American sci-fi series

- Genre: Science fiction; Action
- Created by: Mark A. Altman; Steve Kriozere
- Starring: Priscilla Quintana; Oliver Dench; Raechelle Banno; John Harlan Kim; Ben Radcliffe; Banita Sandhu; Martin Bobb-Semple; Noah Huntley; Akshay Kumar; Nicole Castillo-Mavromatis
- Composers: Joe Kraemer; Penka Kouneva
- Country of origin: United States
- Original language: English
- No. of seasons: 2
- No. of episodes: 23

Production
- Executive producers: Mark A. Altman; Steve Kriozere; Thomas P. Vitale; Karine Martin; Chris Philip
- Production location: Bulgaria
- Production companies: Radioactive Fishtank; Vital Signs Entertainment; Starlings Television; Sony Pictures Television

Original release
- Network: The CW
- Release: July 16, 2019 – December 13, 2020

Pandora is an American science fiction television series that aired on The CW. The series premiered on July 16, 2019. It consisted of two seasons, for a total of 23 episodes. The final episode aired on December 13, 2020.

== Premise ==
Pandora is a sci-fi action series about a young woman named Jax who survives an attack on the New Portland colony. She loses her parents in the attack and decides to investigate on her own after the official investigation ends without conclusion. Jax returns to Earth and enrolls at the Space Training Academy, where she makes new friends who assist her in her adventures and enemies who are after her secret.

== Cast and characters ==
- Priscilla Quintana as Jacqueline "Jax" Zhou, aka Pandora, a young woman whose parents were killed in a surprise attack on the planet colony they were living on, and who arrives to Earth Space Training Academy as a student, but soon discovers that there are things about herself that she doesn't know or understand.
- Oliver Dench as Xander Duvall, Professor Osborn's teaching assistant at Earth Space Training Academy, he is hiding secrets from Jax despite being attracted to her.
- Raechelle Banno as Atria Nine (season 1), a fellow student at Earth Space Training Academy and a good friend of Jax.
- John Harlan Kim as Greg Li (season 1; guest season 2), (Note: Kim is credited in the main cast for episodes 1 to 3 of the first season. He is credited as a guest in "A Simple Twist of Fate".) a fellow student at Earth Space Training Academy and was briefly Jax's boyfriend.
- Ben Radcliffe as Ralen, an alien Zatarian and a fellow student at Earth Space Training Academy, and who is generally distrusted by Earth students due to the Zatarian's earlier war with Earth.
- Banita Sandhu as Delaney Pilar (season 1), a fellow student at Earth Space Training Academy and Jax's roommate.
- Martin Bobb-Semple as Thomas James Ross (season 1), a fellow student at Earth Space Training Academy and Jax's friend.
- Noah Huntley as Professor Donovan Osborn, Jax's uncle, and a professor at the Earth Space Training Academy who knows more about Jax and her past than he's revealing.
- Akshay Kumar as Jett Annamali (season 2; guest season 1), a trouble-making student who was suspended from Earth Space Training Academy, but who has returned looking for forgiveness and a second chance.
- Nicole Castillo-Mavromatis as Zazie (season 2), Jax's new roommate at Earth Space Training Academy.

The following cast members are only credited as part of the main cast in the episodes in which they appear.

- Tehmina Sunny as Regan Fried (season 1), the daughter of industrialist Harlan Fried.
- Vikash Bhai as Martin Shral, a professor at Earth Space Training Academy who becomes a mentor to some of the students including Jax.
- Tommie Earl Jenkins as Ellison Pevney (season 1), a professor at Earth Space Training Academy.
- Manu Bennett as Leone Vokk (season 1) (Note: Bennett is credited in the main cast in "Knocking on Heaven's Door" only.)
- Tina Casciani as Tierney (season 2; recurring season 1), who has unexplained ties to Thomas's father, and who is ultimately revealed to be more powerful than first assumed. She is head of the Hypatia Crime Syndicate.
- Tegen Short as Matta (season 2), Ralen's wife from Zatar. Amy McPherson played the character in season 1.
- Shani Erez as Admiral Meredith Lucas (season 2), a leader in EarthComm, and Xander's and Jax's supervisor
- Roxanne McKee as Eve (season 2), Jax's mother whom Jax thought had died in the attack on the colony. Charisma Carpenter portrayed the character in the first-season finale.
- Luke Fetherston as Harlan Fried (season 2; recurring season 1), an industrialist who transferred his consciousness into a younger clone body.

Ben Cross appears in the first season as the original Harlan Fried.

== Episodes ==
Season	Episodes	Originally released	
Season	Episodes	First released	Last released
1	13	July 16, 2019	October 1, 2019
2	10	October 4, 2020	December 13, 2020

=== Season 1 (2019) ===
Each episode of the first season is named after a Bob Dylan song title except episode seven, which is named for Dylan's 30th studio album.

No. overall	No. in season	Title	Directed by	Written by	Original release date	U.S. viewers (millions)
1	1	"Shelter from the Storm"	Steve Hughes	Mark A. Altman	July 16, 2019	0.72
After losing her parents in an attack, Jax Zhou, aka Pandora, leaves the New Portland colony and travels back to Earth. She joins Space Training Academy and meets Atria Nine who invites her to Black Hole, the campus bar where students drink and have fun. There, she gets introduced to Thomas James Ross and Greg Li and meets with Ralen, the Zatarian ambassador's son. At the evening party organized by her uncle, professor Donovan Osborne, Jax discovers the investigations of her parents’ death have not been closed and decides to find out the truth on her own. With Ralen's lead, they steal a space ship and travel to where she hopes to find some clues. She finds Xander Duvall, her uncle's teacher assistant, waiting for her; he wants to stop her from getting expelled. She defies him and walks down the cave until she reaches a mysterious portal. She enters the portal dragging Xander with her, but soon after that, they hear gunfire outside and quickly head back through the portal to find themselves under attack. Back to the academy, professor Osborne tells his assistant they must stop Pandora before she becomes responsible for the death of every human being in existence.
2	2	"Chimes of Freedom"	Steve Hughes	Mark A. Altman	July 23, 2019	0.59
Shortly after the destruction of the Tereshkova, an Earth vessel, Professor Osborn tasks Xander with spying on Ralen, who was aboard two days prior to the accident. Seeker Hubbel, the Adari religious leader, arrives to Earth to give a speech on campus, but Atria Nine, a former Adari, is outraged about his visit. Atria Three, an Adari clone, meets Nine and asks her to lead the revolution and liberate the clones. They agree to swap roles with Atria Nine leaving back home with Seeker. Jax decides to travel to Adar and rescue her friend.
3	3	"Masters of War"	Christian Gossett	Steve Kriozere	July 30, 2019	0.52
4	4	"I Shall Be Released"	Brett Simmons	Thomas P. Vitale & Brett Simmons	August 6, 2019	0.56
5	5	"Most Likely to Go Your Way (And I'll Go Mine)"	Brett Simmons	Story by : Steve Kriozere; Teleplay by : Darin Scott	August 13, 2019	0.59
6	6	"What Was It You Wanted"	Jenn Wexler	Story by : Mark A. Altman; Teleplay by : Lisa Klink	August 20, 2019	0.62
7	7	"Time Out of Mind"	Mike Hurst	Story by : Mark A. Altman; Teleplay by : Mike Hurst	August 27, 2019	0.52
8	8	"Under the Red Sky"	Tirsa Hackshaw	Marco Schnabel	September 3, 2019	0.46
9	9	"It Ain't Me Babe"	Christian Gossett	John C. Kelley & Steve Kriozere	September 10, 2019	0.62
10	10	"Hurricane"	Brett Simmons	Thomas P. Vitale & Brett Simmons	September 17, 2019	0.54
11	11	"I'll Be Your Baby Tonight"	Brea Grant	Teleplay by : Gabrielle Stanton	September 24, 2019	0.45
12	12	"Knocking on Heaven's Door"	Chris LeDoux	Teleplay by : Steve Kriozere	October 1, 2019	0.50
13	13	"Simple Twist of Fate"	Mark A. Altman	Teleplay by : Mark A. Altman	October 1, 2019	0.38

=== Season 2 (2020) ===
No. overall	No. in season	Title	Directed by	Written by	Original release date	U.S. viewers (millions)
14	1	"Things Have Changed"	Brett Simmons	Mark A. Altman	October 4, 2020	0.33
15	2	"Don't Think Twice, It's All Right"	Brett Simmons	Story by : Mark A. Altman; Teleplay by : Mark A. Altman & Steve Kriozere	October 11, 2020	0.38
16	3	"Gates of Eden"	Chris LeDoux	Steve Kriozere	October 18, 2020	0.37
17	4	"Beyond Here Lies Nothin'"	Brea Grant	Story by : Mark A. Altman; Teleplay by : Susan Estelle Jansen	October 25, 2020	0.27
18	5	"On A Night Like This"	Brea Grant	Story by : Steve Kriozere; Teleplay by : Susan Estelle Jansen & Mark A. Altman	November 1, 2020	0.22
19	6	"Pay In Blood"	Buddy Giovinazzo	Thomas P. Vitale	November 8, 2020	0.26
20	7	"A Fool Such As I"	Christian Gossett	Darin Scott & Steve Kriozere	November 22, 2020	0.25
21	8	"Tell me That It Isn't True"	Maximilian Schmige	Story by : Mark A. Altman; Teleplay by : Lisa Klink & Peter Holmstrom	November 29, 2020	0.29
22	9	"All Along the Watchtower"	Buddy Giovinazzo	Story by : Mark A. Altman; Teleplay by : Brea Grant & Steve Kriozere	December 6, 2020	0.35
23	10	"I Forgot More Than You'll Ever Know"	Buddy Giovinazzo	Mark A. Altman	December 13, 2020	0.24

== Production ==
Pandora was created and written by Mark A. Altman, who is also executive producer along with Steve Kriozere, Thomas P. Vitale, Karine Martin, and Chris Philip. Pandora was produced by Radioactive Fishtank, Vital Signs Entertainment and Starlings Television. The filming for Pandora took place in Bulgaria. Pandora premiered on July 16, 2019, as mid-summer entry during the 2018–19 U.S. network television season. On October 16, 2019, it was announced that The CW Pandora had been renewed for a second season by The CW, which premiered on October 4, 2020. In May 2021, it was revealed that Pandora was quietly cancelled after two seasons.

In October 2021, the producers of Pandora announced plans of seeking a different network for season 3 with production expected to start in early 2022, however nothing materialized.

== Reception ==
=== Critical response ===
Daniel Fienberg of The Hollywood Reporter criticized the show for "some of the cheapest and flattest-looking visuals", adding, "There's no character I particularly liked, no relationship that seems particularly interesting and no mystery embedded in the pilot to which I'd like to get any answers." The review aggregator website Rotten Tomatoes reported a 14% approval rating with an average score of 4.67/10, based on seven reviews.

=== Ratings ===
==== Season 1 ====
Viewership and ratings per episode of Pandora
No.	Title	Air date	Rating/share (18–49)	Viewers (millions)	DVR (18–49)	DVR viewers (millions)	Total (18–49)	Total viewers (millions)
1	"Shelter from The Storm"	July 16, 2019	0.1/1	0.72	0.1	0.25	0.2	0.97
2	"Chimes of Freedom"	July 23, 2019	0.1/1	0.59	0.0	0.15	0.1	0.74
3	"Masters of War"	July 30, 2019	0.1/1	0.52	0.1	0.19	0.2	0.71
4	"I Shall Be Released"	August 6, 2019	0.1/1	0.56	0.0	0.15	0.1	0.71
5	"Most Likely To Go Your Way (And I'll Go Mine)"	August 13, 2019	0.1/1	0.59	0.1	0.13	0.2	0.72
6	"What Was It You Wanted"	August 20, 2019	0.2/1	0.62	0.0	0.14	0.2	0.76
7	"Time Out of Mind"	August 27, 2019	0.1/1	0.52	0.1	0.15	0.2	0.67
8	"Under the Red Sky"	September 3, 2019	0.1/1	0.46	0.1	0.17	0.2	0.63
9	"It Ain't Me Babe"	September 10, 2019	0.1/1	0.62	0.1	0.14	0.2	0.76
10	"Hurricane"	September 17, 2019	0.1/1	0.54	0.1	0.17	0.2	0.71
11	"I'll Be Your Baby Tonight"	September 24, 2019	0.1/1	0.45	0.1	0.21	0.2	0.66
12	"Knocking on Heaven's Door"	October 1, 2019	0.1/1	0.50	0.1	0.17	0.2	0.67
13	"Simple Twist of Fate"	October 1, 2019	0.1/0	0.38	0.0	0.16	0.1	0.54

==== Season 2 ====
Viewership and ratings per episode of Pandora
No.	Title	Air date	Rating/share (18–49)	Viewers (millions)	DVR (18–49)	DVR viewers (millions)	Total (18–49)	Total viewers (millions)
1	"Things Have Changed"	October 4, 2020	0.1	0.33	0.0	0.12	0.1	0.45
2	"Don't Think Twice, It's Alright"	October 11, 2020	0.1	0.38	—N/a	—N/a	—N/a	—N/a
3	"Gates of Eden"	October 18, 2020	0.1	0.37	—N/a	—N/a	—N/a	—N/a
4	"Beyond Here Lies Nothin'"	October 25, 2020	0.0	0.27	—N/a	—N/a	—N/a	—N/a
5	"On A Night Like This"	November 1, 2020	0.0	0.22	0.0	0.10	0.0	0.32
6	"Pay in Blood"	November 8, 2020	0.0	0.26	0.1	0.14	0.1	0.40
7	"A Fool Such As I"	November 22, 2020	0.0	0.26	TBD	TBD	TBD	TBD
8	"Tell me That It Isn't True"	November 29, 2020	0.1	0.29	TBD	TBD	TBD	TBD
9	"All Along the Watchtower"	December 6, 2020	0.1	0.35	TBD	TBD	TBD	TBD
10	"I Forgot More Than You'll Ever Know"	December 13, 2020	0.0	0.24	TBD	TBD	TBD	TBD
