= Emma Hunton =

American actress

- Born: Los Angeles, California, U.S.
- Occupation: Actress
- Years active: 1999–present
- Spouse: Ryan Duval (m. 2017; div. 2021)

Emma Hunton is an American actress. She is best known for playing Davia Moss in the drama series Good Trouble (2019–2024).

== Early life ==
Hunton was born in Los Angeles, California. Her mother was hesitant at her desire to be an actress as she also entered the industry at a young age. She has revealed that she was bullied as a child and didn't have any friends growing up. As a response to the bullying her mother put her in a community theater group. The casting director of the theater said Hunton had the talent to make a career as an actress.

== Career ==
Early on in her career Hunton made appearances in various television shows such as the sitcom The Drew Carey Show, the drama series Judging Amy and the sitcom Sonny with a Chance. Hunton is best known for playing Davia Moss in Good Trouble She said her character is very similar to her real life perso Hunton has also done many theater shows and musicals. Her theatre credits include roles in the Broadway, Off-Broadway, and national touring casts of Wicked (Elphaba), Spring Awakening (Ilse), Next to Normal (Natalie), and Rent (Maureen).

== Personal life ==
Hunton married chef Ryan Duval in October 2017 but ended up divorcing in 2021. Within three seasons of Good Trouble she experienced huge weight loss. In the first season she weighed 275 pounds but by season 4 she was weighing just 142 pounds.

== Filmography ==
=== Film ===
Year	Title	Role	Notes
2005	Happy Endings	Becca	

=== Television ===
Year	Title	Role	Notes
1999	Judging Amy	Sophie	Episode; Witch Hunt
1999	Chicken Soup for the Soul	Carrie	Episode; Carrie's Plan
2003	Angel	Connor's sister	Episode; Home
2003	The Drew Carey Show	Madison	Episode; What's Love Got to Do with It?
2010	Sonny with a Chance	Martha	Episode; High School Miserable
2022	Melon's House Party	Goldie	Episode; Doctor Madam Mayor
2023	Station 19	Monica	Episode; Could I Leave You?
2019-2024	Good Trouble	Davia Moss	88 episodes
