= Based on a True Story (TV series) =

2023 American dark comedy thriller television series

- Genre: Dark comedy; Thriller
- Created by: Craig Rosenberg
- Starring: Kaley Cuoco; Chris Messina; Tom Bateman; Priscilla Quintana; Liana Liberato; Natalia Dyer
- Music by: Sherri Chung
- Country of origin: United States
- Original language: English
- No. of seasons: 2
- No. of episodes: 16

Production
- Executive producers: Craig Rosenberg; Jason Bateman; Michael Costigan; Alex Buono; Kaley Cuoco; Annie Weisman; Chris Messina; Jaclyn Moore
- Producers: Kyle Weber; P. Todd Coe; Missy Mansour; Patrick Ward
- Cinematography: Mark Schwartzbard; Michelle Lawler
- Editors: Varun Viswanath; Chris A. Peterson; Nick Olah; Marissa Mueller; Peter Forslund; Steven Wang
- Running time: 25–55 minutes
- Production companies: Overlook Productions; Aggregate Films; Universal Content Productions; Parasox

Original release
- Network: Peacock
- Release: June 8, 2023 – November 21, 2024

Based on a True Story is an American dark comedy thriller television series created by Craig Rosenberg, starring Kaley Cuoco, Chris Messina, and Tom Bateman. The series premiered on Peacock on June 8, 2023. In October 2023, the series was renewed for a second season, which premiered on November 21, 2024. In April 2025, the series was canceled after two seasons.

== Cast and characters ==
=== Main ===
- Kaley Cuoco as Ava Bartlett, a pregnant real estate agent who is passionate about true crime
- Chris Messina as Nathan Bartlett, Ava's husband and a tennis coach at the Beverly Club who used to be a famous tennis player before a career-ending knee injury
- Tom Bateman as Matt Pierce, a plumber who befriends Nathan
- Priscilla Quintana as Ruby Gale (season 1; guest season 2), Ava's affluent friend
- Liana Liberato as Tory Thompson, a pre-law student and Ava's younger sister who lives with her and Nathan
- Natalia Dyer as Chloe Lake (season 1), a bartender who catches the eye of Matt and Nathan at a bar one night

=== Recurring ===
- Li Jun Li as Michelle (season 1), Nathan's colleague at the country club who briefly dates Matt
- Annabelle Dexter-Jones as Serena, one of Ava's best friends
- Aisha Alfa as Carolyn, another of Ava's best friends
- Alex Alomar Akpobome as Ryan (season 1), a client of Ava's who is looking to buy a mansion
- June Diane Raphael as Romy Lipinski, one of the hosts of the Sisters in Crime podcast
- Brandon Keener as Paul (season 1), Serena's husband
- Miles Mussenden as Detective Quincy Burrell (season 1)
- Jessica St. Clair as Rochelle Lipinski, the other host of the Sisters in Crime podcast
- Aaron Staton as Simon, Ruby's husband with whom she has an open marriage
- Sebastian Quinn as Carlos (season 1), Ruby's paramour
- Kellen Patino as Ollie, Matt's young son
- Melissa Fumero as Drew/Olivia Carter (season 2), a single mother whom Ava befriends
- Sara Paxton as Paige (season 2), Chloe's sister

=== Guest ===
- Pierson Fodé as Jamie (season 1), Chloe's date
- Timm Sharp as Richard (season 1), Carolyn's husband
- Yvonne Senat Jones as Detective Jessie Peterson (season 1)
- Lizze Broadway as Dahlia Stone (season 1)
- Ever Carradine as Melissa Lake (season 1), Chloe's mother
- Claire Holt as a TV writer (season 1)
- George Sear as Jacob (season 1), Tory's Bumble date
- Kingston Rumi Southwick as Jaden (season 2), a teenager whom Nathan coaches for a tennis match
- Stephanie Allynne as Christa (season 2), Jaden's socialite mother
- Casey Wilson as Boobie Bev (season 2), the host of a popular breastfeeding podcast
- Briana Cuoco as a park mom (season 2)
- Josh Stamberg as Danny Merrick (season 2), a famous tennis player and Nathan's rival
- Joe Williamson as Detective Drew Stephens (season 2)
- Willa Holland as Matt's stepmother (season 2), whom he murdered when he was younger

== Episodes ==
=== Series overview ===
Season	Episodes	Originally released
1	8	June 8, 2023
2	8	November 21, 2024

=== Season 1 (2023) ===
No. overall	No. in season	Title	Directed by	Written by	Original release date
1	1	"The Great American Art Form"	Alex Buono	Craig Rosenberg	June 8, 2023
Ava and Nathan Bartlett are a Los Angeles couple expecting their first child in the midst of financial struggles and a failing marriage. They hire a charming plumber, Matt Pierce, to install their new toilet and Nathan quickly befriends him. While at a bar with Matt one night, Nathan shares a flirty interaction with a bartender, Chloe Lake, who is later brutally murdered in her apartment. The media reports Chloe as the latest victim of the "Westside Ripper", a local serial killer targeting young women. When the police find the same shoe covers as Matt's at the crime scene, Ava, a true-crime enthusiast, deduces that Matt is the Westside Ripper. She also noticed scratches on Matt's arms and connects him to the unsolved murder of a young woman in his apartment building in Pomona two years earlier. Instead of contacting the police, Ava proposes to Nathan that they start their own podcast so they can interview Matt. Despite initially declining, Nathan confronts Matt on a secluded beach and accuses him of being the Westside Ripper while Ava watches them from afar.
2	2	"BDE"	Anu Valia	Craig Rosenberg	June 8, 2023
A flashback reveals that Matt killed Chloe after following her for some time. In the present, Nathan offers Matt the opportunity to join his podcast in exchange for his silence, but Matt scoffs at Nathan's accusation. At the Beverly Club, LAPD detectives Quincy Burrell and Jessie Peterson question Nathan about his connection to Chloe and Matt. Nathan claims he vaguely remembers Chloe while admitting that Matt is his friend. Unnerved, Nathan insists to Ava that they hand Matt over to the police. The following day, Nathan discusses his proposal with Matt, denying Ava's involvement in order to protect her. To support his accusation, Nathan cites Matt's bloodstained shoe covers, his scratches, and the murdered Pomona woman. After Matt agrees to participate in the podcast, Ava and Nathan choose an empty warehouse as their recording location. Instead of meeting Nathan at the warehouse, Matt surprises Ava on her doorstep.
3	3	"Who's Next"	Anu Valia	Craig Rosenberg	June 8, 2023
Matt tells Ava that he knows she is the one who figured out that he is the Westside Ripper. He brings her to the warehouse with him and supplies the Bartletts with burner phones, while insisting on a new location for the podcast where they will not be easily identified. Matt also reveals that he has named Nathan as his alibi when the LAPD visited him. Ava learns from Ruby that the new season of Sisters in Crime, a hugely popular true-crime podcast, will also focus on the Westside Ripper. Matt takes Ava and Nathan to the new location, a mansion where he once installed a toilet. Matt names the podcast Based on a True Story and the trio records the first episode, in which Matt confesses he has murdered over 20 women. Dissatisfied with Ava and Nathan's cut of the first episode, Matt persuades them to upload his own cut, which he feels is more original. Ava convinces a hesitant Nathan to confirm Matt's alibi to the LAPD detectives. As the podcast goes live, the Bartletts anxiously check the download numbers.
4	4	"The Survivor"	Jennifer Arnold	Craig Rosenberg	June 8, 2023
The Bartletts and Matt attend CrimeCon, a true-crime convention in Las Vegas, in an effort to improve their podcast, which has reached just over 100 downloads. The Lipinski sisters, the hosts of Sisters in Crime, introduce a surprise live speaker named Dahlia Stone, the supposedly sole survivor of the Westside Ripper, who is raising money for charity. During the panel, she recounts how she survived the Westside Ripper and asserts that she would instantly recognize him if she saw him again. Indignant, Matt assures Ava and Nathan that he has never met Dahlia and sets out to discredit her. Ava and Nathan run into Ruby and her lover Carlos, who are also attending CrimeCon. That night, Matt confronts Dahlia at the rooftop bar, accusing her of fabricating her survival story and running a charity fraud. Shortly afterward, Dahlia falls from the rooftop to her death, impaling herself on a patio umbrella in front of Ava, Nathan, Ruby, and Carlos while they are having dinner.
5	5	"Ted Bundy Bottle Opener"	Jennifer Arnold	Craig Rosenberg	June 8, 2023
Ava immediately suspects Matt of pushing Dahlia off the rooftop, though he denies murdering her. Nathan dissuades Ava from confessing everything to the police, as he has already lied about Matt's alibi. At a CrimeCon stall selling Westside Ripper merchandise, Matt meets a television writer who helps him realize that audiences crave "fresh content". Nathan, Ruby, and Carlos take ecstasy during a wild night of partying. The next morning, the Lipinski sisters' memorial tribute for Dahlia is interrupted by Matt hosting a live episode of Based on a True Story in another room. Using a voice changer, Matt remotely identifies himself as the Westside Ripper and confesses to pushing Dahlia to her death. As a large crowd gathers for the event, the Bartletts go to confront Matt, whereupon Ava drops her burner phone. Matt explains to Ava and Nathan that he lied about killing Dahlia because their listeners are interested in new murders. Ruby picks up Ava's burner phone and reads her latest message to Matt accusing him of killing Dahlia.
6	6	"Love You, Buzzfeed"	Francesca Gregorini	Craig Rosenberg	June 8, 2023
Thanks to Matt's stunt at CrimeCon, Based on a True Story becomes a nationwide sensation. Ava, Nathan, and Matt attend a charity auction at Ruby and Simon's mansion. Ruby calls Matt on Ava's burner phone and sees him answer the call on his own burner. She confronts Ava with the burner, suspecting that Matt is the Westside Ripper. Ava convinces Ruby that she and Nathan, desperate for money, created a fake podcast where Matt merely pretends to be the Ripper. Nathan wants to reclaim his dog McEnroe, whom the Bartletts gave to Simon because their backyard was too small. During dinner, Carlos leaves Ruby after Simon bribes him. When Ava goes to console Ruby, Ruby blackmails Ava into letting her join the podcast, threatening to take Matt's glass with his fingerprints to the police, but Ava rebuffs Ruby. The podcast faces online backlash from numerous celebrities for its glorification of violence. During a heated argument with Ruby, Simon shoots McEnroe dead, then points his gun at Nathan in front of the other guests. Matt defuses the situation, before receiving a notification that the podcast has been removed from Spotify.
7	7	"National Geographic"	Francesca Gregorini	Craig Rosenberg	June 8, 2023
After Based on a True Story is removed from all major platforms, Nathan proposes that they create their own subscription-based platform. Matt wants to resume his killing spree in order to offer exclusive content to their subscribers, which Ava and Nathan strongly oppose. Matt takes Nathan to their usual bar to play darts, during which Matt attempts to convince Nathan to let him kill again to keep the podcast alive. Matt also advises Nathan not to feel guilty about McEnroe's death, leading Nathan to punch Matt in the face and strangle him to the ground. When Nathan returns home, Ruby stops by and seduces him in an effort to persuade him to let her into the podcast. Nathan drives Ava to the Malibu beach house that they have always wanted, but she feels that they need to resolve their marital problems before buying a house. An argument ensues, with Ava declaring that Nathan gave up on life after his tennis injury. Just as Ava is about to leave, she and Nathan are horrified to find Ruby's dead body with a dart in her neck on the doorstep.
8	8	"The Universe"	Alex Buono	Craig Rosenberg	June 8, 2023
Ava and Nathan frantically call Matt and demand that he deal with Ruby's body. Matt claims that Ruby was planning to turn the couple in to the police and instructs them to bring her body to their house. After placing the body in their car trunk, the Bartletts rush home and are greeted with a surprise 10-year anniversary party, which Ava's sister Tory organized with Matt. Simon, who arrives uninvited at the party, steps outside with Nathan and proposes a reconciliation. When Ruby's phone starts ringing in the trunk, Nathan tells Simon that all is forgiven and rushes him back inside. Ava and Nathan find a voicemail on Ruby's phone from Detective Burrell regarding the Westside Ripper, confirming Matt's claim. While Matt and Tory are having a secret affair, the Bartletts go to the Beverly Club at night and bury Ruby's body in a pit on the tennis court, which will be sealed with cement the next day. Later that night, while the Bartletts are scrubbing Ruby's blood off the floor of their Malibu house, Simon arrives unexpectedly at their doorstep.

=== Season 2 (2024) ===
No. overall	No. in season	Title	Directed by	Written by	Original release date
9	1	"Liquid Gold"	Alex Buono	Annie Weisman	November 21, 2024
Ava and Nathan have welcomed a baby boy, Jack. Simon is arrested for Ruby's murder after being framed by Matt, who is supposedly undergoing psychotherapy to suppress his murderous impulses. When the Bartletts discover that Matt is actually at a luxury wellness center in Mexico with Tory, Nathan flies to Mexico to retrieve Tory. Matt assures Nathan that he is cured of his "disease". Tory tells Nathan that she knows about Matt's past and acknowledges his healing journey. Matt reveals to Nathan that when he went to Ruby's house to kill her in order to prevent her from going to the police, he secretly witnessed Simon killing Ruby during an argument; Matt then snuck Ruby's dead body out of the house. Tormented by hallucinations of Ruby, a guilt-ridden Ava visits Simon, who has been placed under house arrest. When Nathan texts Ava that Simon killed Ruby, Simon becomes agitated and insists he had no intention of killing Ruby, prompting Ava to flee. Matt and Tory return from Mexico and announce their engagement to the Bartletts.
10	2	"Control F for Murder"	Alex Buono	Jaclyn Moore	November 21, 2024
The Bartletts attempt to dissuade Tory from marrying Matt, but she insists that he has reformed. Nathan reluctantly agrees to become Matt's sobriety sponsor. Now working as a private tennis coach, Nathan has been coaching teenager Jaden for an upcoming match. However, Jaden's mother Christa fires Nathan for parking his Jeep in front of her mansion. The next day, at the urging of Matt, Nathan persuades Christa to rehire him, which she reluctantly does after Jaden demands to keep Nathan as a coach. Since playing in front of his mother makes Jaden nervous, Matt offers to handle Christa, which worries Nathan. After Jaden wins his match, Matt returns with Christa and tells Nathan that he resisted the urge to kill her. Encouraged by Tory to make new friends, Ava befriends Drew Stephens, a single mother who has had her second child. Some time later, Drew, revealed to be a homicide detective, is at the crime scene of a murdered young woman, deducing that the Westside Ripper is back.
11	3	"Relapse"	Anu Valia	Sono Patel	November 21, 2024
As the media attributes the recent murder to the Westside Ripper, Ava immediately confronts Matt, causing friction between Ava and Tory. Matt denies any involvement in the murder and proclaims that someone is tarnishing his "legacy". Ava confides in Drew about Tory's problematic boyfriend. Nathan learns that a charity auction will offer the chance to bid on a tennis match with his rival, star player Danny Merrick, who defeated Nathan in the 2006 match that resulted in his career-ending knee injury. Drew informs Ava that she is a homicide detective and is determined to catch the Westside Ripper. Ava surreptitiously takes photos of the case files in Drew's purse. Matt goads a dejected Nathan into bidding all of his and Ava's savings on the match with Danny, with Nathan winning the bid. Ava realizes that the new serial killer is a copycat killer mimicking the Westside Ripper and other notorious serial killers.
12	4	"Y'all Ready for This?"	Anu Valia	Max Searle	November 21, 2024
Ava investigates the connection between the Copycat Killer's three victims—a journalist (who wrote an exposé on the pharmaceutical industry), a sex therapist, and a mother (who used to attend underground sex parties). Under the guise of reigniting their sex life, Ava takes Nathan to a sex party to further her investigation. Although initially upset to discover Ava's ulterior motives, Nathan helps her investigation as they question a man who discloses that the mother was his "naughty nurse" and that he was at another party the night she was killed. Following an AA meeting, Matt approaches Chloe's sister, Paige, and offers condolences for her loss, though she rebuffs his suggestion to attend a grief support group. Realizing that all three victims are connected to the medical field, Ava, using a bunny filter to conceal her identity and calling herself "Murder-Bunny", divulges her findings on a TikTok video. On the set of a Dr. Fauci biopic, Jared Leto, who is playing the title role, is found dead in his trailer.
13	5	"Double Fault"	Jenée LaMarque	Spindrift Beck	November 21, 2024
Ava becomes furious when Nathan confesses that he bid their savings on a rematch against Danny Merrick. Drew gives Tory her card, offering to talk to her about her fiancé. As Ava's Murder-Bunny account suddenly becomes popular, the Copycat Killer contacts her, threatening to kill people unless she solves a cipher in 24 hours. Ava decodes the cipher with Matt's help and, as Murder-Bunny, announces on TikTok that the killer's next target is a doctor at Cedars-Sinai. During their match, an enraged Nathan blames Danny for his knee injury and physically attacks him, leading to Nathan's arrest. Unbeknownst to Ava, Matt has solved a portion of the cipher in which the Copycat Killer addresses him, which he shows to Tory. After learning that she named the wrong Copycat Killer victim, Ava goes to Drew's office but instead finds a male detective named Drew Stephens. In her house, the woman known as Drew, whose real name is Olivia Carter, has assembled her own evidence board containing photos of Ava, Nathan, and Matt.
14	6	"Based on a Drew Story"	Jenée LaMarque	Amelia Swedeen	November 21, 2024
Tory suggests to Matt that they move their wedding up to that night, in order to grant her spousal privilege and thus prevent her from testifying against him. After Ava bails Nathan out of jail, they find that Olivia's house is empty. The Bartletts confront the real Detective Stephens with the possibility that Olivia stole case files from him pertaining to the Copycat Killer, but he scares them off. Ava discovers that the baby Olivia claimed to be hers is actually the child of a woman who had hired Olivia as a nanny. Matt calls Nathan and asks him to be his best man at his and Tory's wedding that night, which they organized in the Bartletts' backyard without their knowledge. While on the phone with Nathan, Matt sneaks into Detective Stephens' house and fatally stabs him. Shortly after Ava and Nathan return home for the wedding, Olivia arrives looking for Matt, aware that he is the Westside Ripper. While Olivia holds the Bartletts and Tory at gunpoint in the living room, Matt arrives and reveals that Olivia is his ex-wife.
15	7	"Shotgun Wedding"	Alex Buono	Max Searle & Debbie Ezer	November 21, 2024
While Matt and Olivia are arguing, Tory impulsively stabs Olivia to death. Matt and Tory proceed with the wedding, since they both need spousal privilege. As they bury Olivia's body in the woods, Nathan denounces Matt as manipulative and they engage in a physical altercation, after which Nathan abandons Matt. The next day, the Bartletts resolve to protect themselves after discovering that Matt has left the Copycat Killer a cipher surrounding Olivia's body. Ava posts one final TikTok video as Murder-Bunny, but unwittingly exposes herself when the filter glitches. As a result, Ava and her family have their personal information leaked. Posing as a friend of Olivia's, Tory picks up Matt and Olivia's son, Ollie, and reunites him with Matt. The Copycat Killer texts Matt, confirming they have seen his cipher. The Lipinski sisters blackmail the Bartletts into appearing anonymously as guests on Sisters in Crime to discuss their Based on a True Story podcast. At the sisters' studio, they zip-tie Ava and Nathan to chairs, before the Copycat Killer murders both sisters and announces the Bartletts as the next victims.
16	8	"This Week's Guest"	Alex Buono	Jaclyn Moore & Sono Patel	November 21, 2024
Paige reveals herself as the Copycat Killer and proceeds to torment Ava and Nathan. As Matt becomes the prime suspect in Ollie's kidnapping, Matt, Tory, and Ollie retreat into a hotel room, while Tory grows concerned about Ava. When Paige has Ava call Tory back to assuage her concerns, Ava uses a code word to alert Tory that she is in trouble. Paige reveals she has been targeting people who profited from true crime following her sister Chloe's murder. After Tory pinpoints Ava's location using the latter's AirPods, Matt breaks into the Sisters in Crime studio. Holding Ava at knifepoint, Paige demands a recorded confession from Matt, before Nathan knocks Paige unconscious. Tory drops Ollie at a police station and leaves a voicemail for Ava using their code word. Matt informs the Bartletts that he will turn himself in. As the trio exits the studio, the police arrest Nathan (who realizes Matt has been framing him all along) for murder, while Matt and Paige are gone. In an empty room, Paige wakes up tied to a chair as Matt declares that they need to talk.

== Production ==
In April 2022, it was announced that Peacock had given a straight-to-series order to a comedy thriller series created by Craig Rosenberg and Jason Bateman. In August, it was announced that Kaley Cuoco had joined the main cast as a realtor, Ava Bartlett. In October, it was announced that Chris Messina had been cast as Nathan, the husband of Ava, with additional casting including Tom Bateman, Liana Liberato, Priscilla Quintana, Natalia Dyer, and Li Jun Li announced the following month. In October 2023, Peacock renewed the series for a second season. In March 2024, Rosenberg had been replaced by Annie Weisman as showrunner for the second season. He still remained as an executive producer, but he wanted to pursue other projects as well.

The series was executive produced by Jason Bateman and Michael Costigan through Aggregate Films, and Craig Rosenberg. Roxie Rodriguez served as co-executive producer for Aggregate Films. Production companies for the series include Aggregate Films and Universal Content Productions.

== Release ==
All eight episodes of the first season were released to stream on Peacock on June 8, 2023. The eight-episode second season was released on November 21, 2024.

== Reception ==
=== Critical response ===
The review aggregator website Rotten Tomatoes reported an approval rating for the first season of 74% based on 50 critic reviews, with an average rating of 6.7/10. The website's critics consensus reads, "True crime enthusiasts have been satirized more sharply, but engaging leads and a lightly humorous touch make Based on a True Story worth investigating." Metacritic, which uses a weighted average, assigned a score of 59 out of 100 based on 24 critics, indicating "mixed or average reviews".

The second season has an 83% approval rating on Rotten Tomatoes, based on 12 critic reviews, with an average rating of 7.6/10.

=== Accolades ===
Award	Year	Category	Recipient(s)	Result	Ref(s)
Astra TV Awards	2024	Best Actress in a Streaming Comedy Series	Kaley Cuoco	Nominated	
California On Location Awards	2023	Location Manager of the Year – Episodic TV – 1/2 Hour	David Flannery	Nominated	
California On Location Awards	2023	Location Team of the Year – Episodic TV – 1/2 Hour	David Flannery, Aaron Cota, Armando Boquiren, Elizabeth Reynolds, Justin Rowland, Ken Daroca, Todd Duffey, Constance Nava	Nominated	
Venice TV Awards	2023	Best TV Series	Based on a True Story	Nominated	
