= Inside Man: Most Wanted =

2019 American crime thriller film

- Promotional poster
- Directed by: M. J. Bassett
- Written by: Brian Brightly
- Produced by: Ogden Gavanski
- Starring: Aml Ameen; Rhea Seehorn; Roxanne McKee; Urs Rechn
- Cinematography: Manoel Ferreira
- Edited by: Vanick Moradian
- Music by: Sonya Belousova; Giona Ostinelli
- Production companies: Universal 1440 Entertainment; Imagine Entertainment
- Distributed by: Universal Pictures Home Entertainment
- Release date: September 24, 2019
- Running time: 105 minutes
- Country: United States
- Language: English

Inside Man: Most Wanted is a 2019 American crime thriller film directed by M. J. Bassett and starring Aml Ameen, Rhea Seehorn, and Roxanne McKee. A sequel to the 2006 film Inside Man, it was released direct-to-video in the United States on September 24, 2019. It was also released onto Netflix and other pay-on-demand digital platforms.

== Plot ==
Five years after Dalton Russell's gang stole loot from the bank of Arthur Case, exposing him as a Nazi collaborator, a group of bank robbers led by Ariella Barash take over the Federal Reserve Bank of New York and take everyone in the building hostage. Their goal: to steal a large stash of Nazi gold stored inside the building. In response, a joint task force led by FBI negotiator Brynn Stewart and NYPD negotiator Remy Darbonne is deployed to resolve the situation.

While negotiating with Ariella, who calls herself Most Wanted, Stewart and Darbonne separately learn of her motivations behind participating in the heist. Arthur Case has died while under ongoing house arrest. His son, Dietrich, takes Dalton (revealed to be David Barash) hostage, and forces Ariella, his sister, to participate in order to financially compensate Dietrich for the earlier loss of Arthur's treasure.

Unknown to the two negotiators and the rest of the robbery crew, Ariella and her sister Ava engineer the robbery to make it look like a failure. They leave behind subtle clues for Stewart and Darbonne to pick up on in the aftermath. Ava is on the outside and manages to talk with Darbonne by claiming her abusive ex-boyfriend is one of the robbers. Ariella leaves a family photo revealing their biological relationship to brother David in the safety deposit box. She also leaves Stewart a cell phone to guarantee the arrest of Dietrich and recovery of the stolen gold.

Dietrich is arrested by the FBI and the gold is recovered, but not before he can order David's execution, who had been held hostage by Nazis in Berlin. During the aftermath of Dietrich's arrest, Darbonne and Stewart speculate on the fates of Ariella and Ava. He states he believes Ariella is alive and that people will die when she learns that her brother is gone. In a mid-credits scene, a disguised Ariella enters a bar in Berlin to shoot Dietrich's men, avenging her brother's death.

== Cast ==
- Aml Ameen as Remy Darbonne, NYPD hostage negotiator
- Rhea Seehorn as Dr. Brynn Stewart, FBI hostage negotiator
- Roxanne McKee as Ariella Barash, bank robber
- Urs Rechn as Joseph, bank robber
- Akshay Kumar as Ansh Ramachandra, FBI agent
- Jessica Sutton as Ava Barash, bank robber

== Production ==
In November 2006, it was announced that a sequel to Inside Man was in development, with Russell Gewirtz reprising screenwriting duties. Under the working title Inside Man 2, the film would have Brian Grazer again serve as producer. Spike Lee was in negotiations to reprise his directing duties while serving as an executive producer alongside returning member Daniel M. Rosenberg. In 2008, Terry George was in negotiations to write the screenplay for the sequel; he later replaced Gewirtz, whose screenplay was abandoned. The plot for the sequel was intended to continue after the events of the first film, with Dalton Russell (played by Clive Owen) masterminding another robbery, and again matching wits with NYPD hostage negotiator Keith Frazier (Denzel Washington). Lee confirmed that Washington, Owen, Jodie Foster and Chiwetel Ejiofor would all reprise their roles. He also expressed interest in filming Inside Man 2 during the fall of 2009.

In 2011, it was announced that plans to make Inside Man 2 had been cancelled. Lee confirmed this, expressing that he could not secure funding for the project. "Inside Man was my most successful film, but we can't get the sequel made," he said. "And one thing Hollywood does well is sequels. The film's not getting made. We tried many times. It's not going to happen."

In November 2018, Aml Ameen was cast in the film.

Sonya Belousova and Giona Ostinelli composed the film score. Back Lot Music released the soundtrack.
