= Dragon Striker =

Animated sports fantasy series

- Genre: Epic; Sports; Fantasy
- Created by: Sylvain Dos Santos; Charles Lefebvre
- Directed by: Charles Lefebvre
- Voices of: Akshay Kumar; Rebecca LaChance; Yeukayi Ushe; Waylon Jacobs; Evanna Lynch
- Theme music composer: Cash Callaway
- Opening theme: "Power of the Dragon" by Sarah West
- Ending theme: "The Very End" by Kieran Rhodes
- Composer: Kevin Penkin
- Countries of origin: United States; France
- Original language: English
- No. of seasons: 1
- No. of episodes: 11

Production
- Executive producer: Sylvain Dos Santos
- Production companies: La Chouette Compagnie; Disney Television Animation (Note: Uncredited)

Original release
- Network: Disney XD (United States); Disney Channel/Disney+/Hulu (U.S./Worldwide)
- Release: June 9, 2026 – present

Dragon Striker is an animated epic sports fantasy television series created by Sylvain Dos Santos and Charles Lefebvre, and produced by La Chouette Compagnie in association with Disney Television Animation. It follows farmboy Key, who joins a team that plays a game called gorotama - a football-like game that is augmented by magic. The series debuted on June 9, 2026 on Disney XD, and premiered worldwide on Disney Channel and Disney+ on June 10. Initially labeled as a Disney+ Original, the series was relabeled as a Disney Channel Original at the 2025 edition of the Annecy International Animation Film Festival. A second season is scheduled for release in early 2027.

== Synopsis ==
In an elite academy where sports and magic combine, farm boy Key discovers his ultrapowerful natural talent and learns he may be destined to become the legendary Dragon Striker. He joins the fierce goalkeeper Ssyelle to form a scrappy team of underdogs who take on the school champions. As Key struggles to control the raging dragon inside him and Ssyelle captains the team to a series of upset victories, they learn dark secrets of the past and uncover an ancient evil that threatens them all.

— Disney Branded Television

== Cast and characters ==
- Akshay Kumar as Key Nagatatsu
- Rebecca LaChance as Ssyelle Tournefeuille
- Yeukayi Ushe as Milo Stonegarden
- Waylon Jacobs as Odward Stonegarden
- Evanna Lynch as Ameline

=== Additional voice cast ===
- Laura Aikman
- Christine Allado as Lilas Glasmearin
- Díana Bermudez as Callista Ferreiro
- Emily Carey
- Silas Carson as Surya Sunspear
- Christopher Chung
- Joshua Collins as Ragno Garanthar
- Aimee-Ffion Edwards as Skadi Savarog
- Ruthie Henshall
- Arina Ii as Pregrina Freaks, Ondine McKraken
- Luke Kempner
- Gregg Lowe as Griffin Wells
- Omar Malik
- Shai Matheson as Announcer
- Joseph May
- Flora Montgomery as Noreen Sugoi
- Patrice Naiambana as Sanga
- Shala Nyx as Cleo Philopatra
- Sarah Pitard as Beatrix D. "Rumble Bee" Rumble, Brunelca Ostercrumble
- Cherrelle Skeete
- Ellen Thomas as Nurse Volgora
- Stefan Trout as Casper Ferreiro

== Episodes ==
No. overall	No. in season	Title	Directed by	Written by	Original release date
1	1	"The Awakening"	Charles Lefebvre	Sylvain Dos Santos Martins Rodrigues; Paul McKeown	June 9, 2026
Key Nagatatsu and his father, Dino, travel to Mestras to drop off produce. Key is excited as they will be near Kal Asterock, the school that teaches Gorotama, his favorite sport. Key meets Ssyelle Tournefeuille, a girl with a time bubble tama, who is training to be a goalkeeper. When the Gorotama teams, the Dragons and the All Stars stop by for food, one of the players Pregrina Freaks, suddenly is unable to play. Key suggests Ssyelle fill in, as they are able to attend a Gorotama game. Despite Ssyelle struggling to use her tama, she manages to block the ball. Dragons leader Ragno Garanthar, frustrated over constantly missing, decides to unleash his Dragon Fury ability. Key, believing Ssyelle will get hurt, rushes the field and unlocks a powerful Dragon tama, sequestering Ragno's tama and wrecking the field. Later, the Dragons' coach Goyen Sugoi visits Key and Dino and explains that the former is the Dragon Striker (just like his late mother Edina) and asks that he join Kal Asterock.
2	2	"Welcome to Kal Asterock − Part 1"	Charles Lefebvre	Todd Garfield	June 9, 2026
Key and Ssyelle arrive at Kal Asterock with Sugoi offering to show Key around, while Ssyelle looks for her dorm. Key encounters the Bards' coach Surya Sunspear who immediately takes a dislike towards Key because he is Edina's son. He later meets Milo Stonegarden, a nervous student, whom he finds impressive because of his jelly tama, as well as his conceited brother Odward, who can make reflective duplicates. Ssyelle meets her dormmate, the quiet and studious Ameline. Sugoi has the aggressive Ragno, who is also said to be the Dragon Striker, show Key around. Key obliviously fails to realize that Ragno despises him. Despite Ssyelle and Milo's concern, Key takes an invitation to the Dragons' training ground, the Dragon Eyrie, a floating training ground within a windstorm. Key is hazed by Ragno and the Dragons and left dangling on a breaking flag. Realizing Key is in trouble, Ssyelle and Milo rush to save him as he falls from the Eyrie.
3	3	"Welcome to Kal Asterock − Part 2"	Charles Lefebvre	Jono Howard	June 9, 2026
Ssyelle and Milo manage to save Key as they collectively land on one of the floating islands above Kal Asterock. Ssyelle notices odd patterns. Key admits that he doesn't know how to activate his tama properly and Ssyelle and Milo do quick training with him so that they can prepare for the banner trials. Despite Key still lacking the understanding of his own tama, the three proceed to the trials where their skills are put to the test. Near the end, Sunspear has Key and Milo play opposite Ssyelle. Despite cutting it close, Ssyelle manages to pass the trial while Key and Milo fall short. Not wanting to join the Bards or Roses, Ssyelle attempts to look for a way to play with Key and Milo and discovers that the symbols on the island were for another long abandoned banner team: The Knights.
4	4	"The Fifth Banner"	Charles Lefebvre	Megan Atkinson	June 9, 2026
Ssyelle approaches Key and Milo with the news that they can still play together if they revive the Knights banner, but they need to recruit two more players to be a team. While everyone turns them down, Ameline readily accepts joining them. Milo approaches his brother Odward, who had just left the Bards after breaking up with Casper Ferreiro, but he refuses to play for an underdog team. While cleaning what was supposed to be the Knights' field, they discover that the Roses have been using it to make compost. They challenge the Knights for the field. Should the Knights lose, Ssyelle must play for them (permanently benched). During the game, Ameline reveals that her tama allows her to absorb other tamas, and Odward decides to join. They successfully defeat the Roses and rush to the banner ceremony, allowing the Knights to officially be reinstated. Later, Sunspear and Roses coach Mara O'Gargine secretly plot to disband the Knights.
5	5	"The Armorer of Mestras"	Charles Lefebvre	Todd Garfield	June 9, 2026
Key, Ssyelle, Milo, and Odward head into Mestras to look for a blacksmith to fix their armor (Ameline stayed behind to continue reading). While Milo leaves to enjoy himself, the other three encounter Casper and his twin sister Callista who mock the three, especially Odward for leaving the Bards. Key and Ssyelle drop the armor off at blacksmith Caliban's shop. When Key accidentally causes a stampede, Ssyelle loses her wallet and they head back to the blacksmith's, only to find Casper and Callista (they are Caliban's children). They challenge them to a street match with the victor getting the armor back. Key and Ssyelle start to function better as a duo when Callista starts using her magnetic tama to viciously attack them. Caliban returns to find the factory in ruins and the armor destroyed. To make up for it, he gives Key and Ssyelle leftover armor. Key and Ssyelle realize they are more alike and happily present their armor to Milo and Odward. Casper and Callista plot revenge against the Knights.
6	6	"Out of Their League"	Charles Lefebvre	Megan Atkinson; Sylvain Dos Santos Martins Rodrigues; Paul McKeown	June 9, 2026
Odward takes the Knights to a game between the Dragons and the Roses to explain how intense the matches are. Milo has a rough encounter with Pregrina leaving him shaken. Made all the worse when they learn that her team the Shadows are who they are playing against first. Odward puts the group through rigorous training, angering them as he positioned himself as leader. Key, Milo, and Ameline agree that Ssyelle should lead them, which Odward reluctantly agrees to. When Pregrina continues mocking the group, Key decides to take Milo to a crypt to help him get over his fear of ghosts, while Ssyelle goes to explore to look up the Shadows' history. Ssyelle discovers something about Pregrina, only for someone to catch her, while Key and Milo encounter ghosts and get chased into a corner.
7	7	"The Sum of its Parts"	Charles Lefebvre	Megan Atkinson; Sylvain Dos Santos Martins Rodrigues; Paul McKeown	June 9, 2026
Milo's jelly tama allows him to fend the ghosts off as he and Key escape. Ssyelle is confronted by the Shadows' coach Goyen Sanga who ominously rebuffs her. Angered over being put in a terrible position, Milo quits the Knights. Key later apologizes for forcing Milo to confront his fear and Ssyelle admits that he convinced him to come back. The Knights play off against the Shadows with the match getting dangerous when Pregrina uses her tama to summon ghosts of older players. The Knights realize that Pregrina's diadem is the source of her power and the Knights manage to knock it off her head. Key and Milo suddenly perform a fused tama ability and win the game. The Knights suddenly gain positive attention from fans as they celebrate their first win.
8	8	"Dragon Fever"	Charles Lefebvre	Todd Garfield	June 9, 2026
Key is frustrated that he still cannot summon his tama, or repeat the feat he did with Milo during the game. The Knights are confronted by the Shaodws, who have a new team captain in Conan Villani, who accuse the Knights of stealing Pregrina's diadem. Key begins to overheat and visits the nurse who tells him to keep calm. The Shadows begin ransacking the Knights' dorm rooms. Ameline reveals that she took the diadem due to its powerful magic. The Shadows, along with Sanga, attack The Knights' base. As Ameline returns the diadem, Key suddenly loses control of his tama and explodes. Ssyelle and Milo use their tamas to keep Key restrained while the Shadows leave with the diadem. When Key calms down, he claims that he can control his tama now. The next day, Key and Milo are able to perform their fusion again. That night, Key has a vision of a blue flaming dragon and realizes that he had awoken something within himself and causes his dorm to blow up.
9	9	"The Dragon Within"	Charles Lefebvre	Jean-Luc Cano; Todd Garfield	June 9, 2026
Milo ends up in the hospital, but is actually quite glad over getting admirers. Key is scolded by the Goyens who want him expelled, but Sugoi fights for him to stay and takes it upon herself to train him. If he is not able to control his tama within the week, he will be expelled. Sugoi shows history of Edina using her Dragon tama and states that she gave her life protecting the school. Sugoi pushes Key to control his tama, but he still has trouble mastering it. As Key goes to tell Ssyelle and Milo that he might leave Kal Asterock, they tell him that he doesn't need to be like his mother. Key speaks to the dragon in his dreams and is able to fully grasp his tama. Key succeeds with passing and rejoins his friends. Later, Falco, Surya's nephew, is in the gym when a mysterious force attacks him.
10	10	"The Leech"	Charles Lefebvre	Marine Lachenaud	June 9, 2026
Falco awakens to see Ameline standing over him, but she flees when the rest of the Roses find him. His tama is completely drained. O'Gargine is convinced that Ameline is indeed the culprit, but the other Goyens are uncertain. The Roses angrily search for Ameline and the Knights admit that they don't know anything about her. Odward poses as O'Gargine and gets Falco to admit that he doesn't know if Ameline actually took his tama. Key, Ssyelle, and Milo find Ameline in the library, but they are suddenly attacked by an irate O'Gargine who traps them with her vine tama. She is stopped by the rest of the Goyens who are able to prove that Ameline is innocent as her tama is not powerful enough. The Knights regroup with a better appreciation for each other and decide to prep for their match against the Bards, only to find their base has been broken into.
11	11	"Revelations"	Charles Lefebvre	Todd Garfield	June 9, 2026
The Knights discover that their armor has been taken and disposed of in a pit (revealed to have been done by the Ferreiro Twins). While down there, they find a tomb for former Knights, but are forced to leave to make it to the match. Key learns that Dino is there and wants to use his tama to impress him, but Ssyelle convinces him to hold off until the second half of the match. The game is intense, but as Key becomes more agitated, Sunspear orders the Ferreiro Twins to take him out "permanently". When Casper insinuates having Key "join" his mother, Key unleashes the Dragon tama and wins the game. However, Casper is horrifically scarred, causing Key to run away in terror. Sunspear confronts Key and reveals that his face was scarred by Edina and that she was no hero, being the one who nearly destroyed the school. Dino stops him as Key realizes that he also knew the truth about his mother.

== Production ==
In June 2022, the series was announced as a greenlit production at the Annecy International Animation Film Festival, among other new productions, noting it would be produced by Cyber Group Studios and La Chouette Compagnie for Disney EMEA. A sneak peek for the series was revealed at the 2023 Annecy International Animation Film Festival. Following the insolvency of Cyber Group in November 2024 and their eventual liquidation in April 2025, the company is not credited or listed as being involved in the final product.

In April 2025, Animation Magazine described the series as "anime-inspired", produced by Disney Television Animation and the "creative team at Chouette Studios", with Claire Sun as art director, with a presentation at 2025 Annecy International Animation Film Festival on the series "creative development journey...[and] the artistic complexities involved in the production process." The series was later featured at a Studio Focus panel at Annecy on June 10, 2025, during which Disney EMEA was said to have "spotlighted Paris-based Chouette Studios' Dragon Striker" and noted its anime influences. Variety noted that, at the festival, series co-creator Sylvain Dos Santos stated that the series has a heavy influence from anime, and on all the work by the studio, saying it had "200 artists, 75 of them animators," and was founded by those who loved "Japanese animation and comics and dreamed of making something in that style." The article further noted that series director Charles Lefebvre listed other series inspirations, such as The Vision of Escaflowne, Final Fantasy IX, and Chrono Trigger, and the real-world city Rio de Janeiro. ScreenRant described the series as "first original anime" produced by Disney, saying it combines "sports action with supernatural elements that effectively channel the energy of classic shōnen anime," drawing inspiration from various anime, with the site predicting the series would "deliver unforgettable and cinematic moments throughout its run."

In March 2026, Animation Magazine profiled various "rising stars" in animation, including Claire Sun, a concept artist on the series, who was noted as graphic author of Taki Tanuki and said that the series had a "team of talented people," with Sun praising series director Charles Lefebvre as teaching her about storytelling, art direction, and design. She also said that all the crew members put "so much heart" into the series, calling it "ambitious" due to the world-building, cast, storyboards, and "beautiful landscapes of the world of Asteria," and said that she had created a lot of "fan content about my favorite characters, twins named Casper and Callista, including stickers, fan art, fan comics, plushies, [and] magnets."

On May 6, 2026, the cast and crew were announced, noting that the series score was "recorded in Japan with an 80-piece orchestra," the writers and producers of the theme song ("Power of the Dragon"), specifically Cash Callaway as writer and producer and Sarah West as performer, and the end credits song ("The Very End") which Kieran Rhodes wrote and performed. The official release state was noted, and an official trailer was posted. Animation Magazine said that the series would blend "European fantasy with Japanese animation influences," while following the hero's journey of an underdog character, with the series "brought to life through high-stakes battles, visually stunning action and expansive mythology." Disney Television Animation is producing the series in collaboration with La Chouette Compagnie.

The series was renewed for a second season on July 2, 2026, and it will be released in early 2027.

== Release ==
The first eleven episodes of the series premiered on June 9, 2026 on Disney XD. It streamed on Disney+ and Hulu the following day. It eventually made its debut on Disney Channel later that same week on June 12, 2026. Prior to the series release, a series of animated shorts was posted on Disney YouTube channels on May 13, 2026, introducing viewers to the "world of Dragon Striker."

== See also ==
- Messi and the Giants, an upcoming television series with similar premise.
