= Akshay Kumar (British actor) =

British actor

- Education: Drama Centre London
- Years active: 2011–present

Akshay Kumar is an English actor. On television, he is known for his roles in the ITV war drama The Halcyon (2017) and the CW series Pandora (2019–2020).

== Early life ==
Kumar was born in the East London Borough of Redbridge. When he was 10, his mother enrolled him in a Saturday stage school. Kumar decided to pursue acting professionally when he performed Shakespeare for the first time at age 15 and subsequently joined the National Youth Theatre. He also took up dancing. He trained at the Drama Centre London, and took a pause from his studies when he was cast in Homeland.

== Career ==
Upon leaving drama school, Kumar joined the recurring cast of the Showtime thriller series Homeland for its fourth season as Rahim, a Pakistani medical student, which aired in 2014. He then appeared in the second season of the TNT crime drama Legends as Ifti Bulfati, as well as the films Legacy and One Crazy Thing.

In 2017, Kumar had a main television credit as barman Adil Joshi in the ITV World War II drama The Halcyon. He also had small roles in the CTV series The Indian Detective and the film Star Wars: The Last Jedi. Kumar played FBI agent Ansh Ramachandra in the 2019 crime thriller film Inside Man: Most Wanted with Aml Ameen, Rhea Seehorn, and Roxanne McKee.

After making a guest appearance in the first season of the CW science fiction series Pandora, also in 2019, Kumar joined the main cast as student Jett Annamali for its second season in 2020. He played Ray in the FX on Hulu miniseries Devs and starred in Syndrome at the Tristan Bates Theatre. The cast were nominated for a 2021 Offie. Kumar starred in the 2023 film Double Blind with Millie Brady. That same year, he appeared in the romantic drama film Beautiful Disaster and the ITVX sitcom Count Abdulla.

In 2021, Kumar wrote an article for Backstage on a two-year period of his career when he worked a day job.

== Filmography ==
=== Film ===
Year	Title	Role	Notes
2011	Paper Boy	Salim	Short film
2012	The Telemachy	Imran	
2015	Legacy	Cam	
2016	One Crazy Thing	Nikki Veer	
2017	Unlocked	Technician	
2017	Star Wars: The Last Jedi	Mega-Destroyer First Order Monitor	
2018	The Agency	Mr Leaves	Short film
2019	Land's End	Adam	Short film
2019	Inside Man: Most Wanted	Ansh Ramachandra	
2023	Beautiful Disaster	Adam	
2023	Double Blind	Amir	

=== Television ===
Year	Title	Role	Notes
2012	White Heat	Aasif	Episode: "The Personal is Political"
2014	The Suspicions of Mr Whicher	Roshan Jabour	Episode: "Beyond the Pale"
2014	Homeland	Rahim	3 episodes (season 4)
2015	Legends	Ifti Bulfati	3 episodes (season 2)
2017	The Halcyon	Adil Joshi	Main role
2017	The Indian Detective	Aarav Pitale	3 episodes
2019–2020	Pandora	Jett Annamali	Guest, season 1 Main role, season 2
2020	Devs	Ray	4 episodes
2022	Death in Paradise	Zach Ogilvy	1 episode
2023	Count Abdulla	Rishi	3 episodes
2026-present	Dragon Striker	Key Nagatatsu (voice)	Main cast
