= Zuri Adele =

American actress

- Occupation: Actress
- Years active: 2010–present

Zuri Adele is an American actress. She is best known for playing Malika Williams in the drama series Good Trouble.

== Early life ==
Adele grew up in a family of performance poets, dancers, writers, actors, and educators. She attended the Oprah Winfrey Leadership Academy for Girls and the University of California, Los Angeles.

== Career ==
Adele made her debut in 2010 in a short film called Russian Roulette.

She is best known for playing Malika Williams in Good Trouble. She had to audition four times for the role, and was starting to think she wouldn't make it in the acting business. She hopes to act in a sports film in the future.

== Personal life ==
Adele is very spiritual. She practices prayer, yoga, meditation, crystal sound bowl healing, connections with loved ones, and continuous self-care.

== Filmography ==
=== Film ===
Year	Title	Role	Notes
2010	Russian Roulette	Michelle	Short
2014	The Social Worker	Margo Winters	Short
2016	Plenty	Rae	
2018	C.R.E.A.M. & Butter	Vawn	Short
2019	Spilt Milk	Lena	Short

=== Television ===
Year	Title	Role	Notes
2013	Under the Dome	Mother	Episode; Witch Hunt
2019-2024	Good Trouble	Malika Williams	88 episodes
