= Priscilla Quintana =

American actor, model

- Occupations: Actress, model
- Years active: 2014–present

Priscilla Quintana is an American actress and model. Quintana starred in The CW science fiction series Pandora as Jacqueline "Jax" Zhou. She appears as Ruby Gale in the Peacock comedy Based on a True Story, and has the recurring role of Isabella on Freeform's Good Trouble.

== Early life ==
Quintana is from Downey, California. Her mother found time to help out pregnant teen girls that had been thrown out of their homes. This, combined with her maternal grandparents' work rehabilitating female drug addicts, formed Quintana's core values of community service. She remembers a Christmas tradition of her family volunteering at soup kitchens, helping feed the homeless.

After spending her early years around the entertainment industry in Southern California, Quintana decided to study the business side of movie making. She won a scholarship to film school, helping support herself by waitressing. It was during this period she was approached by a modeling agency, and Quintana decided to move to Los Angeles to pursue this new opportunity.

== Career ==
While booking modelling jobs, Quintana also started getting offers for acting roles in commercials. This quickly led to small acting roles in television and films. Among these were a couple of uncredited parts as a Casino Hostess in The Gambler (2014) and as a Foam Girl in Fast & Furious 7 (2015). Bigger parts followed, and in 2017 Quintana landed a major supporting role in Polaroid (2019), where she met and starting dating her on-screen boyfriend, Keenan Tracey.

In 2018, Quintana was cast as lead Jacqueline "Jax" Zhou, in The CW science fiction series Pandora. In January 2020, it was announced that Quintana would also have a recurring role as Isabella, in Freeform's Good Trouble.

== Charity work ==
Quintana has expressed a strong affinity for animals, and has fostered homeless dogs that were otherwise at risk of being euthanized. While filming Pandora in Bulgaria, she decided to bring many of the stray dogs she met back to the United States. Quintana now continues this work by volunteering with the LA-based rescue organization Wag and Walks.

She often volunteers with Feeding America and rescues dogs with Tobie's small dog rescue.

== Personal life ==
Quintana dated New York Yankees outfielder Giancarlo Stanton.

== Filmography ==
=== Film ===
Year	Title	Role	Notes
2014	The Gambler	Casino Hostess (uncredited)	
2015	Furious 7	Foam Girl (uncredited)	
2018	Traffik	Christine	Listed first in cast by order of appearance
2019	Polaroid	Mina	

=== Television ===
Year	Title	Role	Notes
2015	Web Atlas	Dana / Olivia	Web series; 3 episodes
2016	VR Startup	Jenny	Episode: "Pilot"
2016	Masters of Sex	Fabiana (uncredited)	Episode: "The Pleasure Protocol"
2017	Training Day	Girl (uncredited)	Episode: "Sunset"
2018	Lethal Weapon	Phoebe Clarke	Episode: "Jesse's Girl"
2019–2020	Pandora	Jacqueline "Jax" Zhou	Lead role
2020–2024	Good Trouble	Isabella Tavez	Main (season 4); recurring (seasons 2–3, 5)
2023–2024	Based on a True Story	Ruby Gale	Main (season 1); guest (season 2)

=== Commercials ===
Year	Title	Role	Notes
2014	Scion FR-S TV Commercial	Woman walking from car	'Makes Everything Epic'
