= Good Trouble (TV series) =

American drama television series

- Genre: Social issues drama
- Created by: Joanna Johnson; Bradley Bredeweg; Peter Paige
- Showrunner: Joanna Johnson
- Starring: Maia Mitchell; Cierra Ramirez; Zuri Adele; Sherry Cola; Tommy Martinez; Roger Bart; Emma Hunton; Josh Pence; Beau Mirchoff; Bryan Craig; Priscilla Quintana; Booboo Stewart
- Opening theme: Bel Ami by Kim Bingham
- Composers: Michael Brook; Amanda Jones
- Country of origin: United States
- Original language: English
- No. of seasons: 5
- No. of episodes: 88

Production
- Executive producers: Joanna Johnson; Peter Paige; Bradley Bredeweg; Greg Gugliotta; Christine Sacani; Maia Mitchell; Cierra Ramirez; Jennifer Lopez; Benny Medina; Elaine Goldsmith-Thomas; Jon M. Chu; Megan Lynn; Wade Solomon; Samantha Humphrey
- Cinematography: Marco Fargnoli; Patrick Rousseau; Frank Barrera
- Editors: Myron Kerstein; Adam K. Tiller; Debra Weinstein; Sharon Silverman; Geoff Saville; Dylan Merriman; Reed Flocks
- Running time: 42–61 minutes
- Production companies: Freeform Studios; J.J. Productions; Blazing Elm Entertainment; Nuyorican Productions

Original release
- Network: Freeform
- Release: January 8, 2019 – March 5, 2024

Related
- The Fosters

Good Trouble is an American drama television series created by Joanna Johnson, Bradley Bredeweg, and Peter Paige for Freeform. A continuation of the Freeform series The Fosters, it follows Callie Adams Foster (Maia Mitchell) and Mariana Adams Foster (Cierra Ramirez) after they move out of the family home (Note: As seen in The Fosters series finale.) and into a communal living space in Los Angeles, while embarking on the next phase of their lives. A supporting ensemble cast includes Sherry Cola, Tommy Martinez, Roger Bart, Emma Hunton, Josh Pence, Beau Mirchoff, Bryan Craig, Priscilla Quintana and Booboo Stewart.

The series premiered in January 2019, and was followed by a second season in June 2019, a third in February 2021, a fourth in 2022, and a fifth and final season in 2023, airing its final episode in March 2024. It received universal praise from critics, with the ensemble cast performances, tone, and diverse representations of Gen Z being specifically lauded. Among its accolades, it was nominated for three Teen Choice Awards and two GLAAD Media Awards.

== Plot ==
Taking place shortly after the finale of The Fosters, Adams-Foster siblings Callie and Mariana relocate to Los Angeles to begin the next phase of their lives. As they move into a communal living apartment building called The Coterie, Callie becomes a law clerk working for Judge Wilson, while Mariana becomes a software engineer. The two of them navigate their young adult lives while interacting with their neighbors and the people they befriend.

== Cast and characters ==
- Maia Mitchell as Callie Adams Foster (seasons 1–4; special guest season 5), a recent graduate of UCSD Law School and Mariana's adopted sister. She leaves to join the ACLU in Washington, D.C., in the second episode of season 4, though she has spoken to Mariana occasionally through web chat.
- Cierra Ramirez as Mariana Adams Foster, a software engineer and Callie's adopted sister who recently graduated from MIT
- Zuri Adele as Malika Williams, a bartender and political activist who lives with Callie and Mariana in the Coterie
- Sherry Cola as Alice Kwan, an aspiring stand-up comedian and building manager of The Coterie apartment building
- Tommy Martinez as Gael Martinez, a bisexual graphic designer and artist who falls for Callie
- Roger Bart as Judge Curtis Wilson (seasons 1–2; guest season 3), a conservative judge for whom Callie worked as a clerk
- Emma Hunton as Davia Moss (seasons 2–5; recurring season 1), a body-positive influencer and teacher
- Josh Pence as Dennis Cooper (seasons 2–5; recurring season 1), the oldest tenant in the Coterie who is an aspiring musician
- Beau Mirchoff as Jamie Hunter (seasons 3–4; recurring seasons 1–2; guest season 5), a lawyer and Callie's on-again-off-again boyfriend
- Bryan Craig as Joaquin Peréz (seasons 4–5), a mysterious new resident to the Coterie and investigative journalist who is looking for his estranged sister Jenna
- Priscilla Quintana as Isabella Tavez (season 4; recurring seasons 2–3; guest season 5), an aspiring actress and model
- Booboo Stewart as Luca Ryusaki (season 5; recurring season 4), a homeless man whom Joaquin interviews for a story and is befriended by The Coterie inhabitants

== Episodes ==
=== Series overview ===
Season	Episodes		Originally released	
Season	Episodes		First released	Last released
1	13		January 8, 2019 (Note: The episode was first released online on December 31, 2018.)	April 2, 2019
2	18	8	June 18, 2019	August 6, 2019
2	18	2	December 16, 2019	
2	18	8	January 15, 2020	March 4, 2020
3	19	10	February 17, 2021	April 21, 2021
3	19	9	July 14, 2021	September 8, 2021
4	18	9	March 9, 2022	May 4, 2022
4	18	9	July 7, 2022	September 1, 2022
5	20	10	March 16, 2023	May 18, 2023
5	20	10	January 2, 2024	March 5, 2024

=== Season 1 (2019) ===
No. overall	No. in season	Title	Directed by	Written by	Original release date	U.S. viewers (millions)
1	1	"DTLA"	Jon M. Chu	Joanna Johnson and Peter Paige & Bradley Bredeweg	January 8, 2019	0.41
2	2	"The Coterie"	Peter Paige	Joanna Johnson	January 15, 2019	0.33
3	3	"Allies"	Laura Nisbet Peters	Kris Q. Rehl	January 22, 2019	0.33
4	4	"Playing the Game"	Michael Medico	Cristian Martinez	January 29, 2019	0.31
5	5	"Parental Guidance Suggested"	Bradley Bredeweg	Joanna Johnson	February 5, 2019	0.36
6	6	"Imposter"	Geoff Haley	Megan Lynn & Wade Solomon	February 12, 2019	0.35
7	7	"Swipe Right"	Troian Bellisario	Ally Musika	February 19, 2019	0.33
8	8	"Byte Club"	Peter Paige	Nicole Paulhus	February 26, 2019	0.39
9	9	"Willful Blindness"	Kelli Williams	Lauren Moon	March 5, 2019	0.41
10	10	"Re-Birthday"	Aprill Winney	Claudia Forestieri & Dan Richter	March 12, 2019	0.31
11	11	"Less Than"	Bradley Bredeweg	Kimberly Ndombe	March 19, 2019	0.33
12	12	"Broken Arted"	Peter Paige	Megan Lynn & Wade Solomon	March 26, 2019	0.34
13	13	"Vitamin C"	Joanna Johnson	Joanna Johnson	April 2, 2019	0.36

=== Season 2 (2019–20) ===
No. overall	No. in season	Title	Directed by	Written by	Original release date	U.S. viewers (millions)
Part 1
14	1	"Percussions"	Peter Paige	Joanna Johnson	June 18, 2019	0.31
15	2	"Torn"	Peter Paige	Joanna Johnson	June 25, 2019	0.32
16	3	"Doble Quince"	Bradley Bredeweg	Joanna Johnson & Ashly Perez	July 2, 2019	0.36
17	4	"Unfiltered"	Laura Nisbet Peters	Resheida Brady	July 9, 2019	0.29
18	5	"Happy Heckling"	Erica Dunton	Adam Starks	July 16, 2019	0.31
19	6	"Twenty-Fine"	Chandra Wilson	Joanna Johnson & Ashly Perez	July 23, 2019	0.30
20	7	"In the Middle"	Jay Chandrasekhar	Nicole Paulhus	July 30, 2019	0.23
21	8	"Disruptions"	Peter Paige	Joanna Johnson	August 6, 2019	0.29
Specials
22	9	"Nochebuena"	Bradley Bredeweg	Joanna Johnson	December 16, 2019	0.33
23	10	"A Very Coterie Christmas"	Peter Paige	Joanna Johnson	December 16, 2019	0.33
Part 2
24	11	"Clapback"	Michael Medico	Megan Lynn & Wade Solomon	January 15, 2020	0.25
25	12	"Gumboot Becky"	Marco Fargnoli	Cristian Martinez	January 22, 2020	0.16
26	13	"Daylight"	Finola Hughes	Megan Lynn & Wade Solomon	January 29, 2020	0.18
27	14	"In Good Conscience"	Aprill Winney	Cristian Martinez & Nicole Paulhus	February 5, 2020	0.22
28	15	"Palentine's Day"	Heather Tom	Teleplay by : Madeline Hendricks; Story by : Chelsea Maccani	February 12, 2020	0.18
29	16	"Fragility"	Troian Bellisario	Cristian Martinez	February 19, 2020	0.16
30	17	"Truths and Dares"	Aprill Winney	Megan Lynn & Wade Solomon	February 26, 2020	0.12
31	18	"Trap Heals"	Jeff Byrd	Teleplay by : Joanna Johnson; Story by : Patrisse Cullors	March 4, 2020	0.10

=== Season 3 (2021) ===
No. overall	No. in season	Title	Directed by	Written by	Original release date	U.S. viewers (millions)
Part 1
32	1	"Capoeira"	Peter Paige	Joanna Johnson	February 17, 2021	0.17
33	2	"Arraignment Day"	Jeff Byrd	Megan Lynn & Wade Solomon	February 24, 2021	0.19
34	3	"Whoosh, Pow, Bang"	Troian Bellisario	Nicole Paulhus	March 3, 2021	0.22
35	4	"Klompendansen"	Bradley Bredeweg	Joanna Johnson	March 10, 2021	0.15
Brandon and Eliza are moving to Amsterdam for work so the Hunters host a dutch themed party for their farewell. The Adams Fosters are in attendance.
36	5	"Because, Men"	Heather Tom	Albert Torres	March 17, 2021	0.17
37	6	"Help"	Yoko Okumura	Thomas Wong	March 24, 2021	0.18
38	7	"New Moon"	Jay Chandrasekhar	Chelsea Maccani	March 31, 2021	0.18
39	8	"Trust"	Katrelle Kindred	Boafoa Offei-Darko	April 7, 2021	0.12
40	9	"Driver's Seat"	Marco Fargnoli	Megan Lynn & Wade Solomon	April 14, 2021	0.15
41	10	"She's Back"	Peter Paige	Joanna Johnson	April 21, 2021	0.19
Part 2
42	11	"Knocked Down"	Laura Nisbet Peters	Joanna Johnson	July 14, 2021	0.12
43	12	"Shame"	Constance Zimmer	Racquel Baker	July 21, 2021	0.21
44	13	"Making a Metamour"	Bradley Bredeweg	August Osterloh & Brit Wigintton	July 28, 2021	0.14
Mariana takes a job working for Kathleen, she provides a different insight into the case the Callie is working on.
45	14	"Picks and Strikes"	Laura Nisbet Peters	Thomas Wong	August 4, 2021	0.12
46	15	"Lunar New Year"	Erica Dunton	Albert Torres	August 11, 2021	0.14
47	16	"Opening Statements"	Charissa Sanjarernsuithikul	Megan Lynn & Wade Solomon	August 18, 2021	0.21
48	17	"Anticipation"	Kristin Windell	Joanna Johnson	August 25, 2021	0.17
49	18	"Blindside"	Michael Medico	Megan Lynn & Wade Solomon	September 1, 2021	0.12
50	19	"Closing Arguments"	Joanna Johnson	Joanna Johnson & Dan Richter	September 8, 2021	0.23

=== Season 4 (2022) ===
No. overall	No. in season	Title	Directed by	Written by	Original release date	U.S. viewers (millions)
Part 1
51	1	"Turn and Face the Strange"	Michael Medico	Joanna Johnson	March 9, 2022	0.10
52	2	"Kiss Me and Smile for Me"	Constance Zimmer	Joanna Johnson	March 16, 2022	0.15
53	3	"Meet the New Boss"	Katrelle Kindred	Megan Lynn & Wade Solomon	March 23, 2022	0.15
54	4	"It's Lonely Out in Space"	Troian Bellisario	Albert Torres	March 30, 2022	0.12
55	5	"So This Is What the Truth Feels Like"	Marco Fargnoli	Samantha Humphrey	April 6, 2022	0.13
56	6	"Something Unpredictable, but in the End It's Right"	Charissa Sanjarernsuithikul	A. Zell Williams	April 13, 2022	0.08
57	7	"Take These Chances"	Sadé Clacken Joseph	Taylor Hamra	April 20, 2022	0.10
58	8	"I Don't Belong Here"	Jeff Byrd	Brian Shin	April 27, 2022	0.12
59	9	"That's Me in the Spotlight"	Laura Nisbet Peters	Megan Lynn & Wade Solomon	May 4, 2022	0.11
Part 2
60	10	"What I Wouldn't Give for Love"	Troian Bellisario	Joanna Johnson	July 7, 2022	0.08
61	11	"Baby, Just Say 'Yes"	Jay Chandrasekhar	Chelsea Maccani	July 14, 2022	0.07
62	12	"Pick a Side, Pick a Fight"	Carla Dauden	August Osterloh & Dan Richter	July 21, 2022	0.05
63	13	"A Penny with a Hole in It"	Michael Medico	Boafoa Offei-Darko	July 28, 2022	0.07
64	14	"Life Is What Happens"	Bradley Bredeweg	Albert Torres	August 4, 2022	0.05
65	15	"You Know You Better Watch Out"	Yoko Okumura	Jo Rochelle & Eva Taylor	August 11, 2022	0.10
66	16	"Mama Told Me"	Michael Traynor	Samantha Humphrey	August 18, 2022	0.06
67	17	"Wake Up from Your Reverie"	Chandra Wilson	Megan Lynn & Wade Solomon	August 25, 2022	0.07
68	18	"This Is Not My Beautiful House"	Joanna Johnson	Joanna Johnson	September 1, 2022	0.08

=== Season 5 (2023–24) ===
No. overall	No. in season	Title	Directed by	Written by	Original release date	U.S. viewers (millions)
Part 1
69	1	"Shot in the Dark"	Marco Fargnoli	Joanna Johnson	March 16, 2023	N/A
70	2	"It Was Not Your Fault But Mine"	Sadé Clacken Joseph	Megan Lynn & Wade Solomon	March 23, 2023	0.08
71	3	"About Damn Time"	Jay Chandrasekhar	Samantha Humphrey	March 30, 2023	0.08
72	4	"Under Pressure"	Troian Bellisario	Albert Torres	April 6, 2023	0.07
73	5	"I Gotta Feeling"	Yoko Okumura	Taylor Hamra	April 13, 2023	0.11
74	6	"Once a Cheater"	Tchaiko Omawale	Brian Shin	April 20, 2023	0.11
75	7	"Turkey for Me, Turkey for You"	Constance Zimmer	Chelsea Maccani	April 27, 2023	0.12
76	8	"I'll Take All the Blame"	Adam K. Tiller	Boafoa Offei-Darko	May 4, 2023	N/A
77	9	"Tell Me Sweet Little Lies"	Michael Medico	Megan Lynn & Wade Solomon	May 11, 2023	0.10
78	10	"Opening Night"	Laura Nisbet Peters	Joanna Johnson	May 18, 2023	0.13
Part 2
79	11	"I Am Doll Parts"	Marco Fargnoli	Joanna Johnson	January 2, 2024	0.11
80	12	"With a Little Help From My Friends"	Sherri Saum	Jo Rochelle	January 9, 2024	0.08
81	13	"Hanging by a Moment"	Carla Dauden	August Osterloh	January 16, 2024	0.09
82	14	"Party of One"	Cierra Ramirez	Samantha Humphrey	January 23, 2024	0.04
83	15	"It's My Party, I Can Die if I Want To"	Sadé Clacken Joseph	Joanna Johnson & Eva Taylor	January 30, 2024	0.08
84	16	"One Way or Another"	Bradley Bredeweg	Albert Torres	February 6, 2024	0.08
85	17	"You Can't Always Get What You Want"	Michael Traynor	Taylor Hamra	February 13, 2024	0.09
86	18	"All These Engagements"	Laura Nisbet Peters	Dan Richter	February 20, 2024	0.09
87	19	"It's All Coming Back to Me Now"	Michael Medico	Megan Lynn & Wade Solomon	February 27, 2024	0.08
88	20	"What Now?"	Marco Fargnoli	Joanna Johnson	March 5, 2024	0.07

== Production ==
=== Development ===
After announcing the ending of The Fosters, Freeform ordered a spin-off series of the show, featuring Callie Adams Foster and Mariana Adams Foster living in Los Angeles five years after the series finale of the parent show. It was given a 13-episode order. On December 10, 2018, it was reported that the California Film Commission had approved $6.6 million of tax credits for a potential second season should Freeform decide to renew the series. On February 5, 2019, the series was renewed for a second season which premiered on June 18, 2019. On January 17, 2020, Freeform renewed the series for a third season which premiered on February 17, 2021. On September 8, 2021, Freeform renewed the series for a fourth season which premiered on March 9, 2022. On August 2, 2022, Freeform renewed the series for a fifth season which premiered on March 16, 2023. On December 8, 2023, Freeform canceled the series after five seasons.

=== Casting ===
On June 11, 2018, Tommy Martinez, Zuri Adele, Sherry Cola, and Roger Bart were cast in regular roles as Gael, Malika, Alice, Judge Wilson respectively. Additionally, Emma Hunton and Ken Kirby were cast in recurring roles as Davia and Benjamin. On November 6, 2019, Shannon Chan-Kent was cast in a recurring role for the second season. On January 24, 2020, Priscilla Quintana joined the cast in a recurring capacity for the second season. On January 28, 2021, Marcus Emanuel Mitchell and Jayson Blair were cast in recurring roles for the third season. On March 3, 2021, Catherine Haena Kim and Craig Parker joined the cast in recurring capacities for the third season. On August 16, 2021, Odelya Halevi was cast in a recurring role for the third season. On February 7, 2022, Quintana was promoted to series regular while Bryan Craig joined the cast as a new series regular and Booboo Stewart was cast in a recurring capacity for the fourth season. On February 24, 2022, Yasmine Aker was cast to replace Halevi in a recasting.

Maia Mitchell later stepped down from her role and her position as an executive producer in order to be with her family in Australia. Her character's final main cast appearance was in the second episode of season four, later returning as a guest star in season 5. On March 24, 2023, it was reported that David Terry and Miguel Pinzon were cast in recurring capacities for the fifth season.

=== Filming ===
Principal production on season 1 commenced on June 11, 2018.

== Reception ==
=== Critical response ===
On the review aggregation website Rotten Tomatoes, the series holds an approval rating of 100% with an average rating of 8.93/10, based on 13 reviews. The website's critical consensus reads, "Good Trouble is a spinoff that leaves the nest and takes graceful flight, bringing a deft comedic touch to the trials and tribulations facing Generation Z." Metacritic, which uses a weighted average, assigned the series a score of 83 out of 100 based on 4 critics, indicating "universal acclaim".

=== Ratings ===
Viewership and ratings per season of Good Trouble
Season	Timeslot (ET)	Episodes	First aired		Last aired		TV season	Avg. viewers (millions)
Season	Timeslot (ET)	Episodes	Date	Viewers (millions)	Date	Viewers (millions)	TV season	Avg. viewers (millions)
1	Tuesday 8 p.m.	13	January 8, 2019	0.41	April 2, 2019	0.36	2018–19	TBD
2	Tuesday 8 p.m. (1–8); Monday 9 p.m. (9); Monday 10 p.m. (10); Wednesday 10 p.m. (11–18)	18	June 18, 2019	0.31	March 4, 2020	0.10	2019–20	TBD
3	Wednesday 10 p.m.	19	February 17, 2021	0.17	September 8, 2021	0.23	2020–21	TBD
4	Wednesday 10 p.m. (1–9); Thursday 10 p.m. (10–18)	18	March 9, 2022	0.10	September 1, 2022	0.08	2021–22	TBD
5	Thursday 10 p.m. (1–10); Tuesday 10 p.m. (11–19); Tuesday 9:30 p.m. (20)	20	March 16, 2023	TBD	March 5, 2024	0.07	2022–23	TBD

==== Season 1 ====
Viewership and ratings per episode of Good Trouble
No.	Title	Air date	Rating (18–49)	Viewers (millions)	DVR (18–49)	DVR viewers (millions)	Total (18–49)	Total viewers (millions)
1	"DTLA"	January 8, 2019	0.2	0.41	0.1	0.24	0.3	0.65 (Note: Live +7 ratings were not available, so Live +3 ratings have been used instead.)
2	"The Coterie"	January 15, 2019	0.2	0.33	—N/a	0.30	—N/a	0.64
3	"Allies"	January 22, 2019	0.1	0.33	0.2	0.36	0.3	0.69
4	"Playing the Game"	January 29, 2019	0.1	0.31	0.2	0.37	0.3	0.68
5	"Parental Guidance Suggested"	February 5, 2019	0.2	0.36	0.1	0.27	0.3	0.63
6	"Imposter"	February 12, 2019	0.1	0.35	0.2	0.31	0.3	0.66
7	"Swipe Right"	February 19, 2019	0.1	0.33	0.2	0.36	0.3	0.69
8	"Byte Club"	February 26, 2019	0.2	0.39	0.1	0.19	0.3	0.58
9	"Willful Blindness"	March 5, 2019	0.2	0.41	0.1	0.25	0.3	0.66
10	"Re-Birthday"	March 12, 2019	0.1	0.31	0.2	0.35	0.3	0.66
11	"Less Than"	March 19, 2019	0.2	0.33	0.1	0.34	0.3	0.67
12	"Broken Arted"	March 26, 2019	0.1	0.34	0.2	0.35	0.3	0.70
13	"Vitamin C"	April 2, 2019	0.2	0.36	0.1	0.27	0.3	0.63

==== Season 2 ====
Viewership and ratings per episode of Good Trouble
No.	Title	Air date	Rating (18–49)	Viewers (millions)	DVR (18–49)	DVR viewers (millions)	Total (18–49)	Total viewers (millions)
1	"Percussions"	June 18, 2019	0.1	0.31	—N/a	0.27	—N/a	0.58
2	"Torn"	June 25, 2019	0.1	0.32	—N/a	—N/a	—N/a	—N/a
3	"Doble Quince"	July 2, 2019	0.1	0.36	0.2	0.28	0.3	0.64
4	"Unfiltered"	July 9, 2019	0.1	0.29	0.2	0.25	0.3	0.54
5	"Happy Heckling"	July 16, 2019	0.1	0.31	0.2	0.26	0.3	0.57
6	"Twenty-Fine"	July 23, 2019	0.1	0.31	—N/a	0.28	—N/a	0.59
7	"In The Middle"	July 30, 2019	0.1	0.23	—N/a	0.31	—N/a	0.54
8	"Disruptions"	August 6, 2019	0.1	0.29	—N/a	0.26	—N/a	0.55
9	"Nochebuena"	December 16, 2019	0.1	0.33	0.1	—N/a	0.2	—N/a
10	"A Very Coterie Christmas"	December 16, 2019	0.1	0.33	0.1	—N/a	0.2	—N/a
11	"Clapback"	January 15, 2020	0.1	0.25	0.1	0.27	0.2	0.52
12	"Gumboot Becky"	January 22, 2020	0.1	0.16	0.1	0.31	0.2	0.47
13	"Daylight"	January 29, 2020	0.1	0.18	0.1	0.29	0.2	0.47
14	"In Good Conscience"	February 5, 2020	0.1	0.22	0.1	0.28	0.2	0.50
15	"Palentine's Day"	February 12, 2020	0.1	0.18	0.1	—N/a	0.2	—N/a
16	"Fragility"	February 19, 2020	0.1	0.16	0.1	0.27	0.2	0.43
17	"Truths and Dares"	February 26, 2020	0.1	0.12	0.1	0.29	0.2	0.41
18	"Trap Heals"	March 4, 2020	0.0	0.10	—N/a	—N/a	—N/a	—N/a

==== Season 3 ====
Viewership and ratings per episode of Good Trouble
No.	Title	Air date	Rating (18–49)	Viewers (millions)	DVR (18–49)	DVR viewers (millions)	Total (18–49)	Total viewers (millions)
1	"Capoeira"	February 17, 2021	0.1	0.17	TBD	TBD	TBD	TBD
2	"Arraignment Day"	February 24, 2021	0.1	0.19	TBD	TBD	TBD	TBD
3	"Whoosh, Pow, Bang"	March 3, 2021	0.1	0.22	TBD	TBD	TBD	TBD
4	"Klompendansen"	March 10, 2021	0.1	0.15	TBD	TBD	TBD	TBD
5	"Because, Men"	March 17, 2021	0.1	0.17	TBD	TBD	TBD	TBD
6	"Help"	March 24, 2021	0.1	0.18	TBD	TBD	TBD	TBD
7	"New Moon"	March 31, 2021	0.1	0.18	TBD	TBD	TBD	TBD
8	"Trust"	April 7, 2021	0.1	0.12	0.1	0.28	0.1	0.40
9	"Driver's Seat"	April 14, 2021	0.1	0.15	0.1	0.25	0.1	0.40
10	"She's Back"	April 21, 2021	0.1	0.19	0.1	0.22	0.1	0.41
11	"Knocked Down"	July 14, 2021	0.1	0.12	0.1	0.24	0.1	0.37
12	"Shame"	July 21, 2021	0.1	0.21	0.1	0.20	0.2	0.41
13	"Making a Metamour"	July 28, 2021	0.0	0.14	TBD	TBD	TBD	TBD
14	"Picks and Strikes"	August 4, 2021	0.0	0.12	TBD	TBD	TBD	TBD
15	"Lunar New Year"	August 11, 2021	0.1	0.14	0.1	0.23	0.1	0.37
16	"Opening Statements"	August 18, 2021	0.1	0.21	0.1	0.25	0.2	0.46
17	"Anticipation"	August 25, 2021	0.1	0.17	TBD	TBD	TBD	TBD
18	"Blindside"	September 1, 2021	0.0	0.12	TBD	TBD	TBD	TBD
19	"Closing Arguments"	September 8, 2021	0.1	0.23	TBD	TBD	TBD	TBD

No DVR ratings are available after the third season.

=== Accolades ===
Year	Award	Category	Nominee(s)	Result	Ref.
2019	Teen Choice Awards	Choice Drama TV Show	Good Trouble	Nominated	
2019	Teen Choice Awards	Choice TV Actress Drama	Cierra Ramirez	Nominated	
2019	Teen Choice Awards	Choice TV Actress Drama	Maia Mitchell	Nominated	
2020	Imagen Foundation Awards	Best Primetime Program - Drama	Good Trouble	Nominated	
2021	ReFrame Stamp	IMDbPro Top 200 Scripted TV Recipients	Good Trouble	Won	
2022	GLAAD Media Awards	Outstanding Drama Series	Good Trouble	Nominated	
2023	GLAAD Media Awards	Outstanding Drama Series	Good Trouble	Nominated	
