= Dench =

Dench is an English surname. Notable people with the name include:

- Charles Dench (1873–1958), English cricketer and umpire
- David Dench (born 1951), former Australian rules footballer, father of Michelle Dench
- Doug Dench (1930–2012), Australian rules footballer
- Emma Dench, English ancient historian, classicist, and academic administrator
- Geoff Dench (1940–2018), British social scientist
- Henry Dench, Mayor of Port Chalmers, New Zealand 1871–1873
- Ian Dench (born 1964), English songwriter and musician
- Jeffery Dench (1928–2014), English actor, older brother of Judi Dench
- Judi Dench (born 1934), English actress
- Michelle Dench, Australian sportswoman
- Oliver Dench (born 1993), English actor and theater maker
- Patricia Dench (born 1932), Australian sports shooter
- Peter Dench (born 1972), English photojournalist
- Rosemarie Dench (born Rosemarie Stewart, 1914–2001), English pair skater
- Sacha Dench, Australian biologist, conservationist and adventurer
- William Dench (christened 1797), English cricketer

== See also ==
- Ethel Dench Puffer Howes (1872–1950), American psychologist and feminist organizer
