= William L. Langer =

American historian (1896–1977)

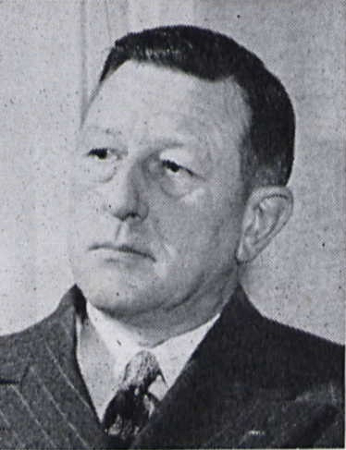
- Langer in 1946

Chief of Research and Analysis Branch of OSS
- In office 1943–1945
- Preceded by: James Phinney Baxter III
- Succeeded by: Office Abolished

Personal details
- Born: April 16, 1896 Boston, Massachusetts, U.S.
- Died: December 26, 1977 (aged 81) Boston, Massachusetts, U.S.
- Spouses: Susanne Katherina Knauth, philosopher (Sept. 3, 1921–div. 1942) *Rowena Morse Nelson (Apr. 9, 1943–1975)
- Relations: Rudolf Ernest Langer (elder brother); Walter Charles Langer (younger brother)
- Children: 2
- Education: Harvard University (BA, PhD)
- Occupation: academic historian, intelligence analyst, policy advisor

Military service
- Allegiance: United States
- Branch/service: United States Army
- Years of service: 1917–1919
- Rank: Sergeant
- Unit: Company E; 1st Gas Regiment; United States Army Chemical Warfare Service
- Battles/wars: World War I; Battle of Saint-Mihiel; Meuse–Argonne offensive

William Leonard Langer (March 16, 1896 – December 26, 1977) was an American historian, intelligence analyst and policy advisor. He served as chairman of the history department at Harvard University. He was on leave during World War II as head of the Research and Analysis Branch of the Office of Strategic Services (OSS). He was a specialist on the diplomacy of the periods 1840–1900 and World War II. He edited many books, including a series on European history, a large-scale reference book, and a university textbook.

== Early life and education ==
Born in South Boston, Massachusetts on March 16, 1896, he was the second of three sons of recent German immigrants, Charles Rudolph and Johanna Rockenbach. His elder brother, Rudolf Ernest Langer, became a mathematician and his younger brother, Walter Charles Langer, a psychoanalyst.

When William was only three, his father died unexpectedly, leaving the family in difficult circumstances. Nevertheless, his mother, who supported the family by working as a dressmaker, made education a priority for her children. After studying at the Boston Latin School, Langer attended Harvard University until 1922.

== Career ==
Langer was fluent in German, and taught German at Worcester Academy while furthering his own education with courses on international relations at Clark University.

His job and education were interrupted by military service World War I. After the war, he returned to his studies and obtained his Ph.D. in 1923. In 1921 he married Susanne Katherina Langer (née Knauth) who became a noted philosopher. They had two sons together before divorcing in 1942.

He taught modern European history at Clark University for four years before accepting an assistant professorship at Harvard. In 1936 Langer became the first to hold the Archibald Coolidge chair.

Langer was remembered at Harvard especially for his History 132 course on modern European history, History 157 on the Ottoman Empire, and the graduate seminars held at his home. He also taught at the Harvard Extension School.

With the help of other scholars during the 1930s, Langer completely revised the Epitome of History by German Scholar Karl Ploetz. Langer's massive work was published in 1940 under the title An Encyclopedia of World History. Its fifth edition (1972) is the last to be edited by Langer. Peter N. Stearns and thirty other prominent historians edited the sixth edition, published in 2001. Stearns paid tribute to Langer's great achievement in the introduction to the new edition.

In 1932, as an associate professor Langer was chosen by Harpers as editor for their series on modern Europe. He wrote the volume covering 1832–1852, "Liberalism, Nationalism and Socialism." Originally in hardcover, the series was republished in the 1960s in paperback as "The Rise of Modern Europe."

== Later career ==
In 1957, Langer urged historians to expand their insights with techniques from modern psychology.

=== War service ===
Langer was an enlisted man in the United States Army Chemical Service in World War I, and saw combat in a chemical weapons unit on the Western Front in France. He described the experience in a book he wrote with another man in his company.

During World War II, Langer served in the new Office of Strategic Services (OSS) as deputy chief and later chief of the Research and Analysis Branch until the end of the war. In correspondence he was identified as OSS 117, a codename which entered French popular culture in 1949 for an unrelated iconic fictional character of books and film. He was special assistant for intelligence analysis to U.S. Secretary of State James F. Byrnes. In 1950 Langer organized the office of National Estimates in the newly established Central Intelligence Agency.

=== After war ===
After the war, Langer returned to academia, but from 1961 to 1977 he served on the President's Foreign Intelligence Advisory Board.

The US government asked Langer to justify policy that had initially been very favorable to Vichy France: this book was entitled Our Vichy Gamble (1947) and it almost totally whitewashed the policy. Langer's book was then used as new evidence to request a review of the trial of Pétain by his lawyer in 1950 (the case was eventually dismissed). According to one reviewer, this book should have been called Our Vichy Fumble.

== Honors ==
William Langer was awarded the Medal for Merit by President Truman in July 1946 in recognition of his wartime service. He was also awarded the Bancroft Prize in 1954. Postwar, both Harvard and Yale University awarded Langer LL.D. degrees as did the University of Hamburg in 1955. Among his many involvements, Langer served as president of the American Historical Association for 1957. Langer received the Golden Plate Award of the American Academy of Achievement in 1965.

== Selected bibliography ==
- Langer, William L.; MacMullin, Robert Burns (1919). With "E" of the First Gas. Brooklyn: Holton printing co. revised as: Gas and Flame in World War I (1965) online
- An Encyclopedia of World History: Ancient, Medieval, and Modern, Chronologically Arranged. © 1972, 1968, 1952, 1948, & 1940. 1948 edition online
- The Franco-Russian Alliance 1890–1894 (1929) online
- European Alliances and Alignments 1871–1890 (1931) (second edition with supplementary bibliographies, Vintage, 1950). online
- The Diplomacy of Imperialism, 1890–1902 (1935, 2nd ed. 1950) online
- Our Vichy Gamble (1947)
- The Challenge to Isolation, 1937–1940 (1952) with S. Everett Gleason online
- The Undeclared War, 1940–1941 (1953) with S. Everett Gleason online
- Conyers Read, 1881–1959: Scholar, Teacher, Public Servant (M. and V. Dean, 1963)
- Political and Social Upheaval, 1832–1852 (1969) online
- In and out of the ivory tower (1977), autobiography online

== Sources ==
- In and Out of the Ivory Tower: The Autobiography of William L. Langer (Neele Watson Academic Publications, 1977) ISBN 978-0-88202-177-5
