= Silas Marcus MacVane =

Canadian-American historian

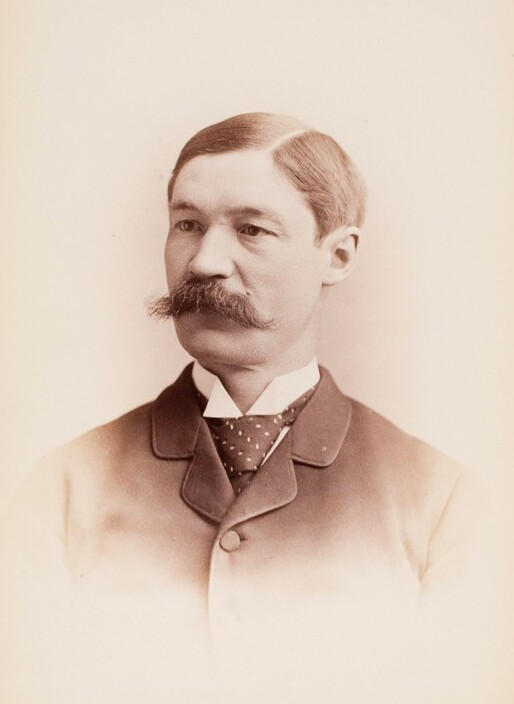
- Born: June 4, 1842; Bothwell, Prince Edward Island, British North America
- Died: January 19, 1914 (aged 71); Rome, Italy
- Education: Acadia College (1865); Harvard University (1873)
- Notable work: Working Principles of Political Economy
- Children: Dorothea Alastair MacVane

4th McLean Professor of Ancient and Modern History
- In office 1886–1911
- Preceded by: Ephraim Whitman Gurney
- Succeeded by: Edward Channing

Silas Marcus MacVane (Macvane) (June 4, 1842 – January 19, 1914) was a Canadian-American historian and economist. He was the McLean Professor of Ancient and Modern History at Harvard University starting in 1887. He was a professor of economics at Harvard from 1873 to 1878 and a professor of history from 1887 to 1911.

MacVane was born in the town of Bothwell on Prince Edward Island. He received his undergraduate degree from Acadia College in Nova Scotia in 1865. From 1865 until 1870 he taught at a school in Nova Scotia, then studied at Harvard University in 1871-1873 under Henry Adams, who instilled in him a love for scientific history. He joined the faculty of Harvard in 1873 in the department of political economy, but transferred to the history department in 1878.

MacVane's main focus of study was modern political history of both the United States and European countries. He was a frequent contributor to The Quarterly Journal of Economics. One of his most popular books was Working Principles of Political Economy (1890; 4th ed., 1897).

Both Presidents Roosevelt attended history courses taught by Professor MacVane at Harvard.

MacVane was the father of Dorothea Alastair MacVane. He died in Rome in 1914, shortly before the start of WWI.

== Sources ==
- Joshua Lawrence Chamberlain, John de Witt and John Howard Van Amringe.Universities and Their Sons: History, Influence and Characteristics of American Universities, with Biographical Sketches and Portraits of Alumni and Recipients of Honorary Degrees (R. Herndon Company, 1899), p. 18.
- Jan. 17, 1911 article from Harvard Crimson on MacVane's resignation
