= Finty Williams =

English actress (born 1972)

- Born: Tara Cressida Williams; 24 September 1972 (age 53); London, England
- Education: Central School of Speech and Drama, 1994
- Occupations: Actress, voice actress
- Years active: 1993–present
- Children: 1
- Parents: Michael Williams (father); Judi Dench (mother)
- Relatives: Jeffery Dench (uncle); Emma Dench (cousin); Oliver Dench (cousin)

Tara Cressida "Finty" Williams (born 24 September 1972) is an English actress. She is best known as the voice of Angelina Mouseling in the ITV animated series Angelina Ballerina.

== Biography ==
Williams was born on 24 September 1972 in London, the only child of Judi Dench and Michael Williams. "Finty" is a nickname coined by her father that stuck, and is the first name Williams uses both personally and professionally. Williams trained at the Central School of Speech and Drama in London, graduating in 1994.

She has one son. Her mother, Judi Dench, has said that Williams did not tell her she was going to be a grandmother until days before the birth.

Williams' picture appears in the opening credits of the British romantic comedy television series As Time Goes By, starring her mother.

Williams was charged with drunk driving in 1998 and 2005. In both instances she was found guilty; she received no jail sentence, but her driving licence was suspended (for two years in the first instance, five years in the second), and she was required to perform community service. She admitted publicly to alcoholism, and sought help. By 2022, she had celebrated her third year of sobriety.

== Filmography ==
=== Film ===
- The Mystery of Edwin Drood (1993)
- The Secret Rapture (1993)
- Mrs Brown (1997)
- Gosford Park (2001)
- The Importance of Being Earnest (2002)
- Ladies in Lavender (2004)
- Even Girls Cry Sometimes (2009)
- Delicious (2013)
- Macbeth (2014)
- We Can Be Heroes (2017)

=== Television ===
- The Torch (1992)
- Tales from the Crypt (1996)
- Wives and Daughters (1999)
- Angelina Ballerina (2001) – Angelina Mouseling, Mrs. Hodgepodge, Aunt Lavender Mouseling, Miss Quaver, Mrs. Thimble, and Miss Twitchett
- Courage the Cowardly Dog (2002) – Tulip (uncredited)
- Born and Bred
- Cranford (2007)
- The Vote (2015)
- Doc Martin (Series 7 Episode 5) (2015)
- The A List (2021)
- Comic Relief - The Repair Shop sketch (2022)

=== Radio ===
- Doctor Who: Demon Quest - The Demon Of Paris - La Charlotte

=== Audiobooks ===
- Hawkmaiden Spellmonger Cadet Series Book One (2019)
- Hawklady Spellmonger Cadet Series Book Two (2019)
- Skyrider Spellmonger Cadet Series Book Three (2019)
- Chain of Gold: The Last Hours Book One (2020)
- Evelina: Or, The History of a Young Lady's Entrance into the World (2016)
- The Girl with All the Gifts (2014)
- I've Got Your Number (2012)
- Lord of Stariel (2018)
- Three Sisters (2021)
- The Tail of Emily Windsnap (2006)
- The Beatryce Prophecy (2021)
- Hetty Feather (2014)
- Sapphire Battersea (2014)
- Emerald Star (2014)
- Queenie (2014)
- The Perfect Nanny by Leïla Slimani (2019)
- The Boy On the Bridge (2017)
- Lullaby (2018)
- Adele (2019)
- Swiss & Chips (2020)

=== Theatre ===
- Pack of Lies (Menier Chocolate Factory, 2018)
- The Ocean at the End of the Lane (UK and Ireland Tour, 2022–2023)
- Here & Now (The Alexandra, Birmingham, 2024)
- Here & Now (UK Tour, 2025–2026)
