= Angelina Ballerina (TV series) =

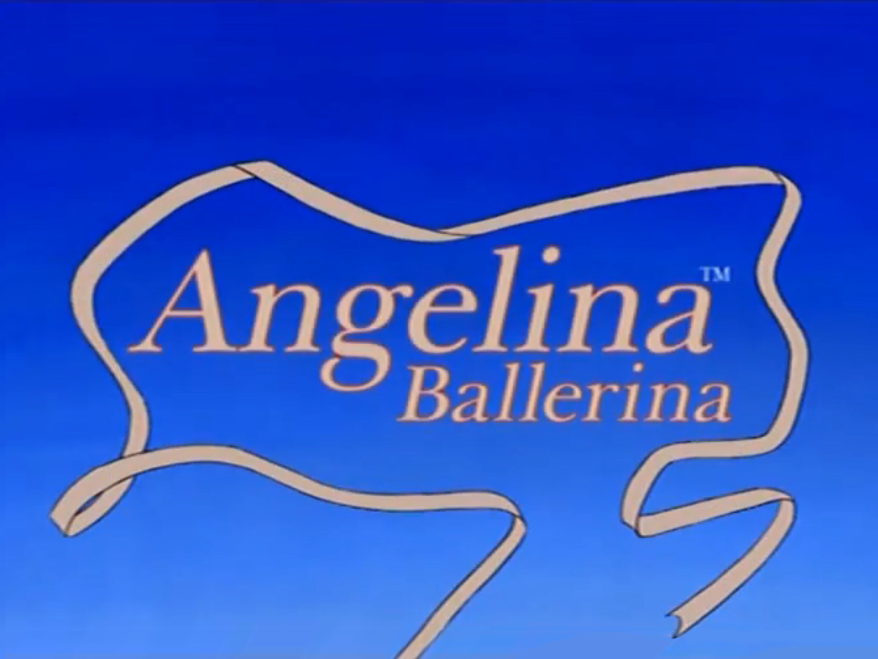
- Genre: Children's television series; Preschool; Comedy
- Based on: Angelina Ballerina by Katharine Holabird; Helen Craig
- Developed by: Barbara Slade
- Directed by: Roger McIntosh; Kitty Taylor
- Voices of: Finty Williams; Judi Dench; Jonell Elliott; Jo Wyatt; Keith Wickham; Adrienne Posta; Rob Rackstraw; Derek Jacobi
- Composer: Colin Towns
- Country of origin: United Kingdom
- Original language: English
- No. of series: 2
- No. of episodes: 20 (40 segments) +3 specials (6 segments)

Production
- Executive producers: Kate Fawkes (series 1); Madeleine Warburg (series 2)
- Producer: Ginger Gibbons
- Running time: 15 minutes 55 minutes (specials); 4-5 minutes (Little Stars)
- Production companies: Grand Slamm Children's Films; HIT Entertainment

Original release
- Network: ITV (CITV)
- Release: 15 October 2001 – 5 September 2006

Related
- Angelina Ballerina: The Next Steps

Angelina Ballerina (TV series) logo

Angelina Ballerina is a British animated preschool children's television series based on the Angelina Ballerina series of children's books by author Katharine Holabird and illustrator Helen Craig. The series is produced by HIT Entertainment with animation production by Grand Slamm Children's Films, and aired on CITV for two series from 2001–03, with three direct-to-video specials following afterward. The series centres on a young mouse named Angelina Mouseling who loves dancing ballet, her family, and her classmates. Finty Williams performed the voice of Angelina and her mother Judi Dench performed the voice of Miss Lilly.

A CGI revival series: Angelina Ballerina: The Next Steps, which continued where the series left off; aired for four series from 2009–2010.

== Characters ==
- Angelina Mouseling (voiced by Finty Williams) is a helpful, feisty, quiet, and soft-voiced little white dancing mouse who loves to dance and always dreams of becoming a famous prima ballerina. Angelina has the tendency to come off as rather hot-headed and demanding at times, but she ultimately means quite well.
- Miss. Lilly (voiced by Judi Dench) is Angelina's Russian-accented ballet teacher. Miss. Lilly is a very kind and loving ballet instructor and mother figure to the mouselings that attend her class. Although she has good intentions, can come across as quite negative at times as she scolds her class if they make mistakes. She grew up in Dacovia, which is a faraway land from Mouseland.
- Alice Nimbletoes (voiced by Jo Wyatt) is Angelina's soft-voiced Yorkshire-accented best friend, who is very skilled at gymnastics. She has a very big appetite and also appears slightly lighter in colour in Angelina Ballerina: The Next Steps.
- Henry Mouseling (voiced by Jo Wyatt) is Angelina and Polly's soft-voiced paternal cousin, Lavender and Louis's son, Grandma and Grandpa's grandson, and Matilda and Maurice's nephew.
- William Longtail (voiced by Keith Wickham) is the only boy in Miss Lilly's ballet class. In some of the episodes, it's shown that he has a crush on Angelina.
- Mr. Longtail (also voiced by Keith Wickham) is William's father who works as a Station Porter and praises his son for any efforts he tries to make, especially if it is his first time.
- Priscilla (voiced by Jo Wyatt; Jonell Elliott in Angelina Sets Sail) and Penelope Pinkpaws (also voiced by Jonell Elliott; Jo Wyatt in Angelina Sets Sail) are twin sisters who are grumpy and very rude together. They tease and belittle nearly everyone, including each other. They are particularly very jealous of Angelina for her dancing talent. They also have a baby brother in the episodes Angelina's Surprise and The Ballet Tickets.
- Sammy Watts (also voiced by Jo Wyatt) is one of Angelina's classmates in school. Sammy is a bully who often causes trouble for William and Angelina particularly, but has a heart of gold.
- Mr. Watts is Sammy's dad who only appeared in a few episodes. His first name is never used.
- Mr. Maurice Mouseling (also voiced by Keith Wickham) is Angelina and Polly's father and the proprietor of the Mouseland Gazette.
- Mrs. Matilda Mouseling (voiced by Jonell Elliott) is Angelina and Polly's mother. Her maiden surname is Fielding. She has a sister named Amanda, who has a son.
- Polly Mouseling (also voiced by Jo Wyatt) is the younger daughter of Maurice and Matilda and the baby sister of Angelina. In the TV series Angelina Ballerina: The Next Steps, Polly is four years old.
- Grandma Sophia Mouseling (voiced by Adrienne Posta) and Grandpa Jeffery Mouseling (also voiced by Keith Wickham) are Angelina, Polly, and Henry's paternal grandparents, Maurice and Louis' parents and Matilda and Lavender's parents-in-law. They are sometimes mentioned in Angelina Ballerina: The Next Steps.
- Uncle Louis Mouseling (voiced by Rob Rackstraw) is Lavender's husband, Maurice's brother, Angelina and Polly's paternal uncle, Matilda's brother-in-law and Henry's father.
- Aunt Lavender Mouseling (voiced by Finty Williams) is Louis's wife, Angelina and Polly's paternal aunt, Maurice's sister-in-law, Matilda's sister-in-law and Henry's mother.
- Mrs. Hodgepodge (voiced by Finty Williams) is Angelina, Polly, Alice, William and Henry's next-door neighbour who does not like dancing. She always appears very grumpy and is viewed with fear by most of the Chipping Cheddar mouselings, but occasionally helps the mouselings often when they least expect it.
- Dr. Tuttle (voiced by Keith Wickham) is the doctor in the town of Chipping Cheddar.
- Miss Quaver (voiced by Finty Williams) is Miss. Lilly's nervous pianist, who plays the piano during dance classes.
- Mr. Ivor Operatski (voiced by Derek Jacobi) is an old friend of Miss. Lilly's and a stern choreographer. Angelina is convinced that he hates mouselings, but it turns out to not be true.
- Queen Seraphina (voiced by Adrienne Posta and later Jonell Elliott) is King George's wife and a childhood friend of Miss. Lilly's who is the present Queen of Mouseland. When she was young, Seraphina was a prima ballerina.
- King George (voiced by Keith Wickham) is Queen Seraphina's husband and the King of Mouseland.
- Princess Valentine (voiced by Adrienne Posta and later Sue Elliott-Nichols) is Queen Seraphina and King George's eldest daughter.
- Princess Sophie (voiced by Jonell Elliott) is Queen Seraphina and King George's middle daughter.
- Princess Phoebe (voiced by Sue Elliott-Nichols) is Queen Seraphina and King George's youngest daughter.
- Anya Mousezauski (voiced by Adrienne Posta) is a shy mouse who comes to Chipping Cheddar as part of a migrant family from Dacovia working together as a team through the harvest season. She has an ear with a black patch that Sammy and the Pinkpaws twins make lots of fun of. She befriends Angelina and Alice and later joins Miss Lilly's ballet class when she returns to Chipping Cheddar for a visit.
- Mrs. Pinkpaws (voiced by Jonell Elliott) is the Southern-accented mother of the twins Priscilla and Penelope and their baby brother who appears in some of the episodes. She wears a lot of jewelry.
- Miss. Chalk (voiced by Jonell Elliott) is a teacher in Angelina's class at school and can be both strict and fair to her pupils.
- Mrs. Thimble (voiced by Finty Williams) is the elderly kindhearted store owner.
- Mr. Ratchett (voiced by Keith Wickham) is a builder and crane driver.
- Miss. Twitchett (voiced by Finty Williams) is a gentle old lady who loves wrapping things up.

== Episodes ==
Series	Segments	Episodes	Originally released	
Series	Segments	Episodes	First released	Last released
1	26	13	4 May 2001	27 July 2001
2	13	7	10 May 2003	21 June 2003
Specials	5	3	30 November 2002	5 September 2006

=== Series 1 (2001) ===
No. overall	No. in series	Title	Written by	Original release date
1	1	"Angelina in the Wings"	Mellie Buse	4 May 2001
1	1	"Arthur the Butterfly"	Sally-Ann Lever	4 May 2001
Director of Madame Zizi's Ballet Mr. Popoff is seeking a replacement Sunbeam dancer. Madame Zizi chooses Henry over Angelina who becomes an understudy. Angelina gets a place on stage when another replacement is required. Angelina finds and takes care of an injured butterfly she calls Arthur. Angelina traps Arthur inside a glass jar, and then Henry accidentally releases him. Later on, Angelina and Henry get trapped in a dark a hole, but Arthur summons help for them. Little Stars segment: Dancing in character
2	2	"The Gift"	Barbara Slade	11 May 2001
2	2	"Treasure Tandems"	Paul Larson	11 May 2001
On Christmas Eve, Angelina receives a hand-painted gift from Miss. Lilly. However, Angelina is unhappy that the gift she made for Miss. Lilly is "not good enough", but Miss. Lilly is absolutely flattered by Angelina's hand-painted Christmas gift. Angelina and Alice take part in a treasure hunt tandem race, avoiding the Pinkpaw twins' cheating attempts. As Angelina and Alice rescue the twins, Henry and William win the race. Little stars segment: Dancing and working together
3	3	"Angelina at the Fair"	Barbara Slade and Jan Page	18 May 2001
3	3	"The Ballet Tickets"	Jan Page	18 May 2001
Angelina reluctantly takes Henry to the fair with her friends. Poor Henry is upset when he wants a blue balloon and wants to go on the Merry go round which makes Angelina frustrated. Alice and Angelina miss their chance to get tickets to the ballet dance and their efforts to find a way all fail. But Angelina's father has a big surprise for both of them. Little stars segment: Learning ballet moves
4	4	"Midnight Muddle"	Paul Larson	25 May 2001
4	4	"Miss Lilly is Leaving"	Dave Ingham	25 May 2001
A prank from Sammy gets him in trouble after Angelina accidentally ruins Mrs. Hodgepodge's prize cauliflower. Angelina, ridden with guilt, confesses and both Angelina and Sammy make it up to Mrs. Hodgepodge when she makes them work. Alice and Angelina hear rumours that Miss. Lilly is leaving Mouseland to teach at another dance school. The ballet mice try to ensure Miss Lilly stays, bearing gifts and dancing, but Miss. Lilly tells them that she is leaving only for the weekend. Little stars segment: Body language
5	5	"Miss Lilly Comes To Dinner"	Diane Redmond	2 June 2001
5	5	"The Lucky Penny"	James Mason	2 June 2001
Miss. Lilly is coming to Angelina's cottage for dinner and Angelina wants everything to be perfect to impress her after a talk with the twins. Angelina makes Corn Royal for Miss. Lilly but when everything does not go to plan Angelina is upset. Angelina comes across a coin she thinks is a Lucky Penny, helping her regain confidence and neglect her dance practice. Then she loses the coin, but she harnesses enough self-confidence to do the dance perfectly for her audition. Little stars segment: The importance of practice
6	6	"Angelina the Mouse Detective"	Laura Beaumont	9 June 2001
6	6	"Angelina and Grandma"	Jan Page	9 June 2001
Garden gnomes are being stolen in Mouseland. Inspired by Monty the Mouse Detective, Angelina becomes a detective. At first, she finds nothing, but she soon discovers that Mrs. Hodgepodge is secretly mending the stolen garden gnomes. Mr. and Mrs. Mouseling leave Angelina in the care of her grandparents, but Angelina tears Miss. Lilly's old tutu and Grandma is too busy planning her friend Mrs. Twinkle's birthday party to mend it. When Grandpa accidentally ruins the cake by leaving it in the rain Grandma blames Angelina and sents her to her room so she runs away but when Grandpa tells Grandma it was him who left the cake in the rain she gets upset when she finds out she was rotten to Angelina and makes up to her. Little stars segment: Homemade costumes
7	7	"Two Mice In a Boat"	Laura Beaumont	16 June 2001
7	7	"The Costume Ball"	Dave Ingham	16 June 2001
Angelina is taking part in a boat decorating contest, but has Sammy as her partner. Their idea for a Pirate-Princess galleon does not work, but at the parade they win the teamwork prize. Angelina is disappointed that she can not join the adults at The Costume Ball. Mrs. Hodgepodge is babysitting her and Alice, as she is the only adult in Mouseland who isn’t going to The Costume Ball. Alice and Angelina decide to disguise themselves as an adult to attend the costume ball but while Angelina wants to dance, Alice just wants some food. Sadly they both get caught by their parents and Mrs. Hodgepodge catches them as “Naughty Little Runaways”. As punishment, they are made to clean up the Hall and eat cabbage jelly sandwiches the following morning. Little stars segment: Working in pairs
8	8	"The Legend of Big Paw"	Paul Larson	23 June 2001
8	8	"The Ballerina Rag Doll"	James Mason	23 June 2001
On a camping trip, Angelina and Henry goes on a mission to find Grandpa's medal. They become lost and see signs that look like the legendary Big Paw until they are met by Colonel Forthfoot. Angelina gives away her old rag doll Polka, but later she really wants her toy of memories back. While teaching a preschool class how to dance, she realises that the new owner Mary needs it more. Little stars segment: Helping younger children to dance
9	9	"The Cheese Ball Cup Final"	Dave Ingham	30 June 2001
9	9	"Angelina and Anya"	James Mason	30 June 2001
William Longtail decides to give up ballet lessons after being teased by Sammy and prepares for The Cheese Ball Cup Final. William is then forced to counter a tough team, but with a little ballet he wins the game and returns to ballet class. A new Chipping Cheddar resident called Anya is introduced and Blueberries go missing in mouse land but the thief is revealed as the pinkpaw twins and there mother. Little stars segment: Folk dancing
10	10	"Angelina's Surprise"	Barbara Slade	6 July 2001
10	10	"The Rose Fairy Princess"	Barbara Slade	6 July 2001
Jealous by the attention the Pinkpaws are getting for their newborn brother, Angelina fibs she's going to have one too. She has great difficulty confessing but finally does when she thinks the Pinkpaws' party is all about her new baby sister. Miss Lilly chooses Angelina to be The Rose Fairy Princess, but Angelina is nervous about the flying stunt. Determined not to let Miss. Lilly down, Angelina goes along with the stunt and overcomes her fear. Little stars segment: Jump dancing
11	11	"Alice's Present"	Jan Page	13 July 2001
11	11	"No Match for Angelina"	Barbara Slade	13 July 2001
Alice gives Angelina a new gym bag, but when she misplaces it, Alice thinks Angelina gave it away and does not appreciate her and the two friends fall out, until Henry finds the bag and Angelina and Alice make up. Angelina is a skilled hockey player, but girls aren’t allowed to be on the team. Angelina joins the team as a boy named Andy. Despite her cover blown, Angelina still makes her winning shot for the team. Little stars segment: Dancing like sports
12	12	"Angelina's Valentine"	Diane Redmond	20 July 2001
12	12	"The Royal Banquet"	Sally-Ann Lever	20 July 2001
Today is Valentine's Day. William Longtail is too shy to give Angelina a Valentine card, so Sammy Watts tricks William just to get Angelina's yo-yo. Angelina finds that she's been duped and takes back the yo-yo and sends William her own Valentine's card. Miss. Lilly takes Angelina to dance for Queen Seraphina and Princess Valentine. Unfortunately, they soon get lost after their train breaks down, but Doctor Tuttle rescues them in his balloon and they reach the palace ready for the grand banquet. Little stars segment: Preparing for a stage show
13	13	"The Gymnastics Championship"	Paul Larson	27 July 2001
13	13	"Angelina's Baby Sister"	Jan Page	27 July 2001
Alice is selected for a Gymnastics Championship. Alice gets vertigo attacks and is up against Phunella, the Pinkpaw twins' cousin. Motivated by Olga Mousicovich, Alice plucks her courage and wins first prize. Angelina now has a baby sister named Polly, but her parents are too busy taking care of Polly to give Angelina attention and are quite disorganized. Angelina then becomes jealous, frustrated, neglected, angry and upset (and starts whining and crying as usual), and goes as far as to destroying her room out of jealousy because she feels like her family doesn't care about her anymore. The whole Mouseling family tries to solve this problem so that Angelina can love and accept her new sister. Little stars segment: Emotional dancing

=== Series 2 (2003) ===
No. overall	No. in series	Title	Written by	Original release date
14	1	"The Proposal"	Jan Page	10 May 2003
14	1	"William the Conjuror"	Dave Ingham	10 May 2003
Angelina thinks that Miss. Lilly is going to marry Ivor Operatski. While trying to stop the proposal, she nearly gets him drowned. Miss Lilly then reveals that Angelina is the leading bridesmaid for Ivor Operatski's new dance. William is prompted by his father to star as a magician for a charity event. When he practices the disappearing trick on Angelina, he and Henry believe that she has disappeared for real. Angelina shows up in time to begin her performance with William Longtail. Little Stars segment: Sleeping Beauty
15	2	"The Old Oak Tree"	Lucy Daniel Raby	17 May 2003
15	2	"Lights, Camera, Action"	Jan Page	17 May 2003
A 300-year-old oak tree has meant a lot to Angelina, Alice, William and Henry. When Priscilla Pinkpaw breaks her left arm from falling out of the tree, Mrs. Pinkpaws insists that the tree has to be removed forever. In response, Angelina and her friends along with Mrs. Hodgepodge. attempt to save it, but by the last minute, the tree collapses by itself before becoming a wooden playground. Angelina, Alice, William and Henry enter a movie competition start up a film based on Thomasina Tuttle, they borrow books and a camera from Doctor Tuttle. But things go wrong when Angelina wants things her way but ends up falling down a hole and hurting herself. But she, Alice, William and Henry win the competition after all. Little Stars segment: Corps de ballet
16	3	"Ace Reporter"	Paul Larson	24 May 2003
16	3	"Heads and Tails"	Laura Beaumont	24 May 2003
With no holiday available, Angelina works with her father at the press. She gets into the reporter business and after some effort, she picks up a scoop from the opera singer Maria Mozzarella. Preparations for Queen Seraphina's visit are made. Disaster strikes when Louis and Maurice break the Queen's statue. Thinking Henry broke it, Angelina and Alice try to mend it. At the unveiling of the statue, Queen Seraphina is flattered. Little Stars segment: Standing still
17	4	"Angelina and the Silver Locket"	Diane Redmond	31 May 2003
17	4	"Mouse of the Year"	Andrew Brenner	31 May 2003
Angelina has to bring Polly to Miss. Lilly's dance party. Angelina takes her mother's silver locket without asking her. She then loses the necklace and fails to find it. She is on the verge of confessing, when she finds that Polly had the silver locket all along. Angelina wants Miss. Lilly to be dedicated as Mouse of the Year. Miss. Lilly gets so preoccupied with preparations for the award, that her dance class is in disarray. Miss. Lilly turns down the award for her class' sake and Angelina feels upset about it. Little Stars segment: Dancing exams
18	5	"Henry's Halloween"	Paul Larson	7 June 2003
18	5	"Anya's Visit"	James Mason	7 June 2003
Henry spots what he thinks is The Chipping Cheddar Witch. Henry and William follow the witch, then Henry winds up with a few mishaps frightening Angelina and Alice and they all realize the witch is actually Miss Lilly. Anya comes for a visit as she wants to stay in Angelina's cottage. Angelina soon becomes jealous of Anya as she is getting better attention. She then snaps at her and Anya stays away from her. Eventually the duo get together again and enjoy themselves. Little Stars segment: Dancing like birds
19	6	"Show and Tell"	Jan Page	14 June 2003
19	6	"Sammy's Club"	Andrew Brenner	14 June 2003
Angelina brings Polly to school for her Show and Tell with Miss. Chalk. But on her way into class, Angelina loses Polly and she begins to worry. However, Sammy Watts manages to find Polly for Angelina just in time for Show and Tell. William wants to be part of Sammy's club. He gains acceptance when Sammy is in need of a new trolley from Mr. Longtail. He ends up letting Angelina and Miss. Lilly down, but his and Sammy's lot make up for it. Little Stars segment: The importance of practice
20	7	"The Anniversary Party"	Diane Redmond	21 June 2003
Tomorrow is Angelina's grandparents 50th wedding anniversary. Grandma is unhappy that her husband is going to forget the event. Angelina tries to sort it out, but she ends up neglecting her dance practice. However, Grandpa has a nice surprise for his wife, Sophia.

=== Specials (2002–06) ===
No.	Title	Written by	Original release date
1	"Christmas In Mouseland"	Mellie Buse	30 November 2002
1	"The Show Must Go On"	Mellie Buse	30 November 2002
The Cinderella Mouse Ballet is showing in the Theatre Royal, directed by Ivor Operatski (guest star Sir Derek Jacobi), a rather strict director. Priscilla Pinkpaw gets the main part but not Angelina because she is unable to sing very well. Distraught that her rival is Cinderella Mouse while she is the Wicked Stepmouse, Angelina tries to prove to Mr. Operatski that she can do it, but without success, so Angelina storms off in a fit of temper. Meanwhile, Henry is unable to withstand Mr. Operatski's angry demands. A sledging accident results in Miss Lilly's ankle broken. Ashamed of her selfishness, Angelina manages to get the show back on track, with Ivor Operatski having a change of heart. Angelina gives it her best shot as the Wicked Stepmouse, resulting in a spectacular performance.
2	"Angelina and the Sleeping Beauties"	Laura Beaumont and Paul Larson	6 September 2005
2	"Angelina’s Princess Dance"	Laura Beaumont and Paul Larson	6 September 2005
Miss Lilly has an exciting opportunity to take Angelina and her class to the Queen Seraphina's Castle for a grand performance, with Angelina as the director and Sammy in charge of special effects. Queen Seraphina also wants Angelina to let her daughters Valentine and Sophie participate in the dance, but Valentine and Sophie are not talented dancers and quite demanding. Things come to a head when the princesses' and Angelina's demands become overwhelming. However, the sisters realise their mistakes and make it up to Angelina and the rest of the dance class. The show commences wonderfully with a surprise appearance of Princess Phoebe.
3	"Angelina Sets Sail"	Barbara Slade	5 September 2006
3	"All Dancers On Deck"	Barbara Slade	5 September 2006
Miss Lilly has a wonderful surprise to take Angelina and her class to (fictional) Dacovia for Ivor Operatski's Ice Fairy Princess performance. On the five-day journey on board the Royal Stilton, Angelina sympathises for Miss Lilly's nephew Yuri being pushed around by the captain and in his love for the captain's daughter. Angelina carries out a plan to resolve this, but only gets Yuri into trouble. When a storm comes, the ship gets wedged between two very big icebergs. To make matters worse, the Pinkpaw twins have broken the radio. The dance performance takes place on the ship instead, but Angelina eventually gets an idea that enables the ship to get back on course and gets Yuri a well-deserved appreciation from the captain. They arrive at Dacovia in time for Ivor Operatski's Ice Fairy Princess performance.

== Development ==
The earliest known instance of when the show was in development, occurred in August 1998.

== Broadcast ==
Nick Jr. acquired British pay-TV rights to the series from HIT Entertainment in 2003, and the series premiered on the network on 6 October.

In the United States, the show was presented by Connecticut Public Television and distributed nationally by PBS Kids from 2002 to 2003; reruns continued on select stations through 2009, as well as on PBS Kids Sprout.

== Reception ==
At Indie Awards in 2004, the first episode in series 2 "The Proposal" was named the winner of Best Animation category.

== Other media ==
=== Merchandise ===
Plush doll sets by American Girl were released and produced around the early 2000s in tandem with books by author Katharine Holabird and illustrator Helen Craig.

=== Revivals ===
SD Entertainment and HIT Entertainment produced a new CGI series called Angelina Ballerina: The Next Steps which ran from 5 September 2009 to 13 November 2010. The series is about Angelina going to a performing arts school. The series was criticized by fans of the original for the redesign or removal of several characters including the setting and format, among other things.

In October 2015, during the MIPCOM, Mattel, and 9 Story Media Group announced a long-term business alliance for a second revival of Angelina Ballerina, intended to air in 2017 alongside a revival of fellow HIT Entertainment program Barney & Friends. However, neither came to fruition.
