= John Ledyard =

American explorer and adventurer (1751–1789)

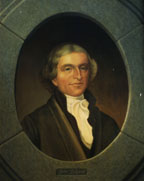
- Born: November 1751; Groton, Connecticut
- Died: 10 January 1789 (aged 37); Cairo, Egypt
- Education: Dartmouth College
- Occupation: Explorer

John Ledyard (November 1751 – 10 January 1789) was an American explorer and adventurer.

== Early life ==
Ledyard was born in Groton, Connecticut, in November 1751. He was the first child of Abigail Youngs Ledyard and Capt. John Ledyard Jr, son of Squire John Ledyard Sr. A day or so after the child was born, Capt. John boarded his father's ship and sailed for the West Indies. Three years later Ledyard joined his grandfather in Hartford, Connecticut, where he attended school. His grandfather died just before Ledyard turned 20 (Squire Ledyard died in September 1771; grandson John III was about three months shy of 21 years of age at the Squire's death).

Ledyard briefly attended Dartmouth College (which was then only three years old), arriving on 22 April 1772. He left for two months without permission in August and September of that year, led a mid-winter camping expedition, and finally abandoned the college for good in May 1773. Memorably, he fashioned his own dugout canoe, and paddled it for a week down the Connecticut River to his grandfather's farm. Today, the Ledyard Canoe Club, a division of the Dartmouth Outing Club, sponsors an annual canoe trip down the Connecticut River in his honor. At loose ends, he decided to travel; "I allot myself a seven-year's ramble more," he wrote to a cousin. He shipped as a common seaman on a year-long trading voyage to Gibraltar, the Barbary Coast, and the Caribbean. On his next voyage, he jumped ship in Portsmouth, England, but was soon impressed and forced to join the British Navy as a marine.

== Captain Cook's third voyage ==
In June 1776, Ledyard joined Captain James Cook's third and final voyage as a British marine. The expedition lasted until October 1780. During these four years, its two ships stopped at the Cape of Good Hope, the Prince Edward Islands off South Africa, the Kerguelen Islands, Tasmania, New Zealand, the Cook Islands, Tonga, Tahiti, and then Hawaii (first documented by the expedition). It continued to the northwest coast of North America, making Ledyard perhaps the first U.S. citizen to touch its western coast, along the Aleutian Islands and Alaska into the Bering Sea, and back to Hawaii where Cook was killed. Ledyard attempted to climb from Kealakekua Bay to Mokuaweoweo, the summit of Mauna Loa, but had to turn back. The return voyage touched upon Kamchatka, Macau, Batavia (now Jakarta), around the Cape of Good Hope again, and back to England.

Still a marine in the British Navy, Ledyard was sent to Canada to fight in the American Revolution. Instead he deserted, returned to Dartmouth, and began to write his Journal of Captain Cook's Last Voyage. It was published in 1783, five years after he had visited Hawaii, and was the first work to be protected by copyright in the United States. (It was in fact protected by Connecticut state copyright by special act of the legislature; federal copyright was not introduced until 1790.) Today, this work is annotated in rare-book bibliographies as the first travelogue describing Hawaii ever to be published in America.

== Fur trade ==
As Ledyard had noticed that sea otter furs from the American northwest commanded extremely high prices in Macau, he lobbied during the early 1780s for the formation of fur-trading companies. Ledyard suggested trading furs for Chinese silk and porcelain, which could then be sold in the United States. Although his partnership with Philadelphia financier Robert Morris was not successful, it did lay the pattern of the subsequent China trade.

Ledyard left the United States in June 1784 to find financial backers in Europe. In Paris he partnered with John Paul Jones; however this venture, too, failed to reach fruition.

== Overland around the world ==
In Paris, Ledyard conceived a remarkably bold scheme of exploration with encouragement from Thomas Jefferson, then American ambassador, and with financial backing from the Marquis de Lafayette, botanist Joseph Banks, and John Adams' son-in-law, William Smith. Jefferson suggested that Ledyard explore the American continent by proceeding overland through Russia, crossing at the Bering Strait, and heading south through Alaska and then across the American West to Virginia.

Ledyard left London in December 1786, and made it most of the way across Russia. He left St. Petersburg in June 1787 to travel through Moscow, Ekaterinburg, Omsk, Tomsk, Irkutsk, and Kirensk, reaching Yakutsk after 11 weeks. Here he stopped for the winter but then returned to Irkutsk to join a larger expedition led by Joseph Billings (of the Cook voyage). However, Ledyard was arrested under orders from Empress Catherine the Great in February 1788, returned to Moscow by approximately his original route, then deported to Poland.

== African expedition ==
Back in London, Ledyard came across the African Association, then recruiting explorers for Africa. Ledyard proposed an expedition from the Red Sea to the Atlantic. He arrived in Alexandria in August 1788, but the expedition was slow to start. Late in November 1788, Ledyard accidentally poisoned himself with vitriolic acid (sulfuric acid) and died in Cairo, Egypt on 10 January 1789. John Ledyard was buried in the sand dunes lining the Nile in a modestly marked grave, the location of which is unknown today.

== Legacy ==
In addition to Dartmouth's Ledyard Canoe Club, in the Spring of 2002, two Dartmouth juniors, Peter Bohler and Peter Brewitt, repeated Ledyard's journey. They traveled over 2,000 miles from Stockholm to St. Petersburg through Sweden, Finland, and Russia, following an old Swedish mail route called the Norrstigen along the coast.

== Selected works ==
- The Last Voyage of Captain Cook: The Collected Writings of John Ledyard, ed. James Zug, National Geographic Adventure Classics, National Geographic Society, 2005.

== Sources ==
- Memoirs of the Life and Travels of John Ledyard, Jared Sparks, 1828.
- American Traveler: The Life and Adventures of John Ledyard, the Man Who Dreamed of Walking the World, James Zug, Basic Books; 30 March 2005. ISBN 0-465-09405-8.
- Ledyard: In Search of the First American Explorer, Bill Gifford, Harcourt; 5 February 2007, ISBN 0-15-101218-0.
- The Making of John Ledyard, Edward Gray, Yale Press, 2007.
