= Encyclopedia of World History =

- Cover of the 1948 edition
- Author: William L. Langer (ed., I-V); Sir Peter Stearns (ed., VI)
- Publisher: Houghton Mifflin Co.
- Publication date: 1940
- OCLC: 226204766

The Encyclopedia of World History is a classic single-volume work detailing world history. The first through fifth editions were edited by William L. Langer.

The Sixth Edition contained over 20,000 entries and was overseen by Peter N. Stearns. It was made available online until removed in 2009.

== Preceding works ==
- Ploetz, Karl (1860s). Auszug aus der alten, mittleren und neueren Geschichte. Project Gutenberg. "A reference work of German and central European history."
- Channing, Edward (1883). Tillinghast, William H (ed.). An Epitome of Ancient, Medieval, and Modern History. Houghton Mifflin Company. "A translated and expanded edition of Dr. Karl Ploetz's 'Epitome of History' with new sections on England and the United States."
- Tillinghast, William H, ed. (1915). A Handbook of Universal History. Houghton Mifflin Company. "A revised edition of An Epitome of Ancient, Medieval, and Modern History."
- Barnes, Harry Elmer; Tillinghast, William H; Imlah, Albert H.; Peardon, Thomas Preston; Wuorinen, John Henry, eds. (1925). A Manual of Universal History. Houghton Mifflin Company. LCCN 25025211. "A revised and expanded edition of A Handbook of Universal History."

== Publication history ==
=== First five editions ===
An Encyclopedia of World History: Advanced, Medieval, and Modern, Chronologically Arranged.

Compiled and Edited by William L. Langer, Coolidge Professor of History, (Emeritus by 1968), Harvard University.

- First Edition. Houghton Mifflin Company. 1940. LCCN 43036919. "A completely rewritten and updated edition of A Manual of Universal History, and its predecessors."
- Revised Edition. Houghton Mifflin Company. 1948. LCCN 48011571. free download
- Revised Third Edition, illustrated with Maps. Boston: Houghton Mifflin Company. 1952. LCCN 52009589.
- Fourth Edition, revised and enlarged, with Maps and Genealogical Tables. Houghton Mifflin Company. 1968. ISBN 0-245-59622-4. LCCN 68014147.
- Fifth Edition, revised and enlarged, with Maps and Genealogical Tables. Boston: Houghton Mifflin Company. April 1972. ISBN 0-395-13592-3. LCCN 72186219.

=== Sixth Edition (2001) ===
Stearns, Peter N (ed.). The Encyclopedia of World History: Ancient, Medieval, and Modern, chronologically arranged. "A completely revised and updated edition of the classic reference work originally compiled and edited by William L. Langer."

- Houghton Mifflin Company (September 2001) ISBN 0-395-65237-5
- James Clarke & Co Ltd. (January 2002) ISBN 0-227-67968-7
- Easton Press (2006)
