= Revolve Theatre Company =

Henley-on-Thames based theatre company

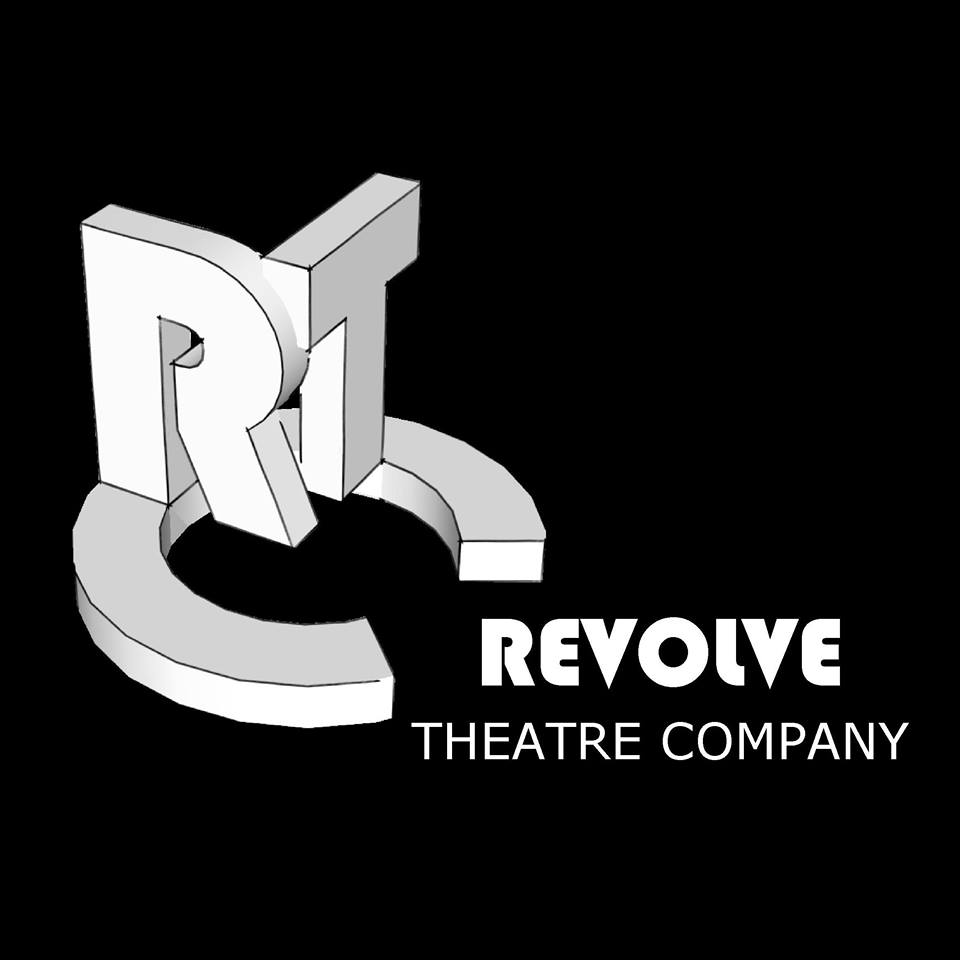
- Company type: Private
- Industry: Theatre
- Founded: 2014
- Headquarters: Henley-on-Thames, Oxfordshire, United Kingdom
- Key people: Oliver Dench (Artistic Director and Co-Founder); Joe Morris (Sound Tech and Co-Founder); Tom Smith (Lighting Tech and Co-Founder)
- Website: www.revolvetheatrecompany.com

Revolve Theatre Company is a Henley-on-Thames based theatre company specialising in political and Shakespearean plays. The company is owned by Oliver Dench, Joe Morris and Tom Smith.

== History ==
Revolve Theatre Company was formed in the summer of 2014 while working together at Henley Theatre Services. The company was formed after the three founders discussed what they liked and didn't like about the theatre.

The first performance by Revolve was a one-man adaptation of Hamlet, in which Oliver Dench played fifteen roles.
