= William Scott Ferguson =

Canadian-born classical scholar

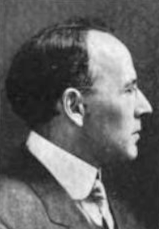
- Born: November 11, 1875; Marshfield, Prince Edward Island, Canada
- Died: April 28, 1954 (aged 78); Cambridge, Massachusetts, United States
- Occupation: Classical scholar
- Father: Donald Ferguson

William Scott Ferguson (November 11, 1875 – April 28, 1954) was a Canadian-American classical scholar.

== Biography ==
William Scott Ferguson was born in Marshfield, Prince Edward Island on November 11, 1875, the son of Senator Donald Ferguson.

He was McLean Professor of Ancient and Modern History at Harvard University from 1929 to 1945. He was elected to the American Academy of Arts and Sciences in 1921. He was president of the American Historical Association in 1939. He was elected to the American Philosophical Society in 1937.

He died at his home in Cambridge, Massachusetts on April 28, 1954.
