= Ride (2016 TV series) =

- Genre: Drama
- Created by: Jill Girling; Lori Mather-Welch
- Starring: Kendra Leigh Timmins; Alana Boden; Oliver Dench; Jonny Gray; Natalie Lisinska; Manuel Pacific; Rameet Rauli; Mike Shara; Sara Botsford
- Theme music composer: "Cold War Love" by Married to the Sea
- Composer: Edward Zaski
- Countries of origin: Canada; United Kingdom
- Original language: English
- No. of seasons: 1
- No. of episodes: 20

Production
- Executive producers: Joan Lambur; Tony Wood; Shelley Scarrow; Nat Abraham; Ira Levy; Michael McGuigan; Peter Williamson
- Producers: Jim Corston; Nadia Jaynes
- Camera setup: Multi-camera
- Running time: 22–23 minutes
- Production companies: Buccaneer Media; Breakthrough Entertainment; Nickelodeon Productions

Original release
- Network: YTV
- Release: September 5, 2016 – February 24, 2017

Ride is a drama television series created by Jill Girling and Lori Mather-Welch that aired in Canada on YTV and in the United States on Nickelodeon. In Canada, the series premiered on September 5, 2016, and ended on October 6, 2016. In the United States, the series premiered on January 30, 2017, and ended on February 24, 2017. The series stars Kendra Leigh Timmins, Alana Boden, Oliver Dench, Jonny Gray, Natalie Lisinska, Manuel Pacific, Rameet Rauli, Mike Shara, and Sara Botsford.

== Premise ==
The series centers on Kit Bridges, an American teenager, who is a new classmate in the equestrian boarding school Covington Academy in England. She befriends a horse named TK.

== Cast ==
- Kendra Leigh Timmins as Kit Bridges
- Alana Boden as Elaine
- Oliver Dench as Will
- Jonny Gray as Josh
- Natalie Lisinska as Sally
- Manuel Pacific as Nav
- Rameet Rauli as Anya
- Mike Shara as Rudy Bridges
- Sara Botsford as Lady Covington

== Production ==
The series was produced by Breakthrough Entertainment in Canada in collaboration with Buccaneer Media in the United Kingdom. Ride was filmed in Toronto and in Northern Ireland. The series was greenlit for a season of 20 episodes. Nickelodeon picked up the series for broadcast in the United States.

== Broadcast and release ==
On August 11, 2016, a full episode was released exclusively on YTV's online platforms ahead of the series premiere. The series premiered on YTV in Canada on September 5, 2016. New episodes aired in Canada for the rest of that week. The series premiered on Nickelodeon in the United States on January 30, 2017.

== U.S. ratings ==
Viewership and ratings per season of Ride
| Season | Episodes | First aired | | Last aired | | Avg. viewers (millions) | 18–49 rank |
| Season | Episodes | Date | Viewers (millions) | Date | Viewers (millions) | Avg. viewers (millions) | 18–49 rank |
|---|---|---|---|---|---|---|---|
| 1 | 20 | January 30, 2017 | 1.21 | February 24, 2017 | 0.99 | 0.99 | TBD |

== Episodes ==
| No. | Title | Directed by | Written by | Canadian air date | U.S. air date | Prod. code | U.S. viewers; (millions) |
|---|---|---|---|---|---|---|---|
| 1 | "Arrival" | Stefan Scaini | Jill Girling and Lori Mather-Welch | September 5, 2016 | January 30, 2017 | 101 | 1.21 |
Guest star: Ellora Patnaik as Madhu
| 2 | "Dresses and Dressage" | Stefan Scaini | Jill Girling and Lori Mather-Welch | September 6, 2016 | January 30, 2017 | 102 | 1.06 |
Guest stars: Ellora Patnaik as Madhu, Marnie Gore as Beatrice
| 3 | "Hippophobia and Ophidiophobia" | Stefan Scaini | Shelley Scarrow | September 7, 2016 | January 31, 2017 | 103 | 1.05 |
Guest star: Sophie Khan Levy as Poppy
| 4 | "Three's a Crowd" | Stefan Scaini | Niki Rooney | September 8, 2016 | February 1, 2017 | 104 | 1.12 |
Guest stars: Ellora Patnaik as Madhu, Mirsa Duka as Peaches
| 5 | "Gone Guy" | Tim Hopewell | Jill Girling and Lori Mather-Welch | September 12, 2016 | February 2, 2017 | 105 | 0.96 |
| 6 | "Wild Horses" | Tim Hopewell | Shelly Scarrow & Michael T. Foley | September 13, 2016 | February 3, 2017 | 106 | 0.91 |
Guest stars: Mirsa Duka as Peaches, Canute Gomes as Alex, Alex Braunstein as Leo, Vinson Tran as Wyatt
| 7 | "One Lump or Two?" | Tim Hopewell | Jill Girling and Lori Mather-Welch | September 14, 2016 | February 6, 2017 | 107 | 0.97 |
Guest star: Mirsa Duka as Peaches
| 8 | "Happy Unbirthday" | Tim Hopewell | Niki Rooney | September 15, 2016 | February 7, 2017 | 108 | 0.91 |
Guest star: Ellora Patnaik as Madhu
| 9 | "After the Ball" | Tim Hopewell | Shelley Scarrow | September 19, 2016 | February 8, 2017 | 109 | 1.04 |
| 10 | "The Cup" | Tim Hopewell | Jill Girling and Lori Mather-Welch | September 20, 2016 | February 9, 2017 | 110 | 1.17 |
Guest stars: Mirsa Duka as Peaches, Alex Castillo as Luciana Andrada, John Nelles as Lord Chatfield Absent: Rameet Rauli as Anya
| 11 | "Stalled" | Tim Hopewell | Jennifer Daley | September 21, 2016 | February 10, 2017 | 111 | 0.91 |
Guest star: Mirsa Duka as Peaches Absent: Rameet Rauli as Anya
| 12 | "Who Rules the School?" | Tim Hopewell | Niki Rooney | September 22, 2016 | February 13, 2017 | 112 | 1.04 |
Guest star: Ellora Patnaik as Madhu
| 13 | "We Need to Talk About Covington" | Stefan Scaini | Jill Girling and Lori Mather-Welch | September 26, 2016 | February 14, 2017 | 113 | 0.85 |
Guest stars: Alex Braunstein as Leo, Helen Johns as Daisy, Richard Clarkin as Bill
| 14 | "Come Horse or High Water" | Stefan Scaini | Matt Schiller | September 27, 2016 | February 15, 2017 | 114 | 1.01 |
Guest stars: Marlaina Andrew as Sarah, Connor Schelling-Tisza as Stable Hand
| 15 | "Steeplechase" | Stefan Scaini | Jill Girling and Lori Mather-Welch | September 28, 2016 | February 16, 2017 | 115 | 0.91 |
Guest star: Jamie Christian-Ward as Santiago Absent: Natalie Lisinska as Sally
| 16 | "Pros & Cons" | Stefan Scaini | Jennifer Daley | September 29, 2016 | February 17, 2017 | 116 | 0.92 |
Guest star: Jenny Young as Elizabeth
| 17 | "Trading Horses" | Stefan Scaini | Jill Girling and Lori Mather-Welch | October 3, 2016 | February 21, 2017 | 117 | 0.98 |
Guest stars: Mirsa Duka as Peaches, Alex Braunstein as Leo, Jenny Young as Elizabeth Absent: Sara Botsford as Lady Covington
| 18 | "Distractions & Deceptions" | Stefan Scaini | Niki Rooney | October 4, 2016 | February 22, 2017 | 118 | 0.87 |
Guest stars: Jenny Young as Elizabeth, Daniel Matmor as Mr. Griffin Absent: Natalie Lisinska as Sally, Sara Botsford as Lady Covington
| 19 | "Let It Ride" | Stefan Scaini | Shelley Scarrow | October 5, 2016 | February 23, 2017 | 119 | 0.94 |
Guest stars: Mirsa Duka as Peaches, Jamie Christian-Ward as Santiago, Daniel Matmor as Mr. Griffin, Marnie Gore as Beatrice
| 20 | "Dark Horse" | Stefan Scaini | Shelley Scarrow | October 6, 2016 | February 24, 2017 | 120 | 0.99 |
Guest stars: Mirsa Duka as Peaches, Jamie Christian-Ward as Santiago, Daniel Matmor as Mr. Griffin, Andrew Musselman as Dr. Hopewell, Marnie Gore as Beatrice
