= McLean Professor of Ancient and Modern History =

Great the greater

The McLean Professor of Ancient and Modern History is a senior professorship at Harvard University. It was endowed by the will of wealthy merchant John McLean.

The first McLean Professor was Jared Sparks who held the chair between 1838 and 1849; he was later President of Harvard College. The current holder is Emma Dench, who was appointed in 2015.

== List of McLean Professors ==
- Jared Sparks (1838–1849); first McLean Professor
- Henry Warren Torrey (1856–1886)
- Ephraim Whitman Gurney (1886)
- Silas Marcus MacVane (1886–1911)
- Edward Channing (1912–1929)
- William Scott Ferguson (1929–1945)
- Crane Brinton (1946–1968)
- Franklin L. Ford (1968–1990)
- Steven Ozment (1990–2015)
- Emma Dench (2015–present)
