= S. Everett Gleason =

American historian

Sarell Everett Gleason (March 14, 1905, Brooklyn - November 20, 1974, Washington, D.C.) was an American historian and intelligence analyst.

== Life ==
He grew up in Evanston, Illinois. He graduated from Harvard University, in 1927, magna cum laude, and with a Ph.D. in 1934. He taught at Harvard University, from 1931 to 1938. On June 19, 1937, he married Mary Eleanor Abbott.

From 1942 to 1946, he was Intelligence Chief for the Office of Strategic Services. He was Deputy Executive Secretary of the National Security Council, and on the Solarium Committee. He wrote, with William Langer, The Challenge to Isolation, for the Council of Foreign Relations. He was a member of the Historical Division of the Department of State, from 1962 to 1970.

His papers are held at the Harry S. Truman Library.

== Awards ==
- 1954 Bancroft Prize

== Works ==
- The Challenge to Isolation, 1937-1940 (1952) with William L. Langer
- The Undeclared War, 1940-1941 Harper & Brothers Publishers, 1953. with William L. Langer (reprint P. Smith, 1968)
- Foreign relations of the United States 1946, Department of State. Bureau of Public Affairs, U.S. Government Printing Office, 1972
