= Harvard Kenneth C. Griffin Graduate School of Arts and Sciences =

Graduate school of Harvard University in Cambridge, Massachusetts

Coordinates: 42°22′25.1″N 71°7′6.3″W

- Former names: Graduate Department of Harvard University (1872–1890); Graduate School of Harvard University (1890–1905); Graduate School of Arts and Sciences (1905–2023)
- Type: Private
- Established: 1872; 154 years ago
- Dean: Emma Dench
- Students: 4,824 (4,599 PhD)
- Location: Cambridge, Massachusetts, United States
- Campus: Urban
- Website: gsas.harvard.edu

The Harvard Kenneth C. Griffin Graduate School of Arts and Sciences (GSAS) is a graduate school within the Faculty of Arts and Sciences at Harvard University.

Formed in 1872, GSAS is responsible for most of Harvard's graduate degree programs in the humanities, social sciences, and natural sciences. The school offers Master of Arts (MA), Master of Science (MS), and Doctor of Philosophy (Ph.D.) degrees in approximately 58 disciplines.

The School's graduates include a diverse set of prominent public figures and academics. The vast majority of Harvard's Nobel Prize-winning alumni earned a degree at GSAS. In addition to scholars and scientists, GSAS graduates have become U.S. Cabinet secretaries, Supreme Court justices, foreign heads of state, and heads of government.

== History ==
GSAS was formally created as the Graduate Department of Harvard University in 1872 and was renamed the Graduate School of Harvard University in 1890. Women were not allowed to enroll in GSAS until 1962.

In 2023, the GSAS was renamed after a US$300 million donation from philanthropist Kenneth C. Griffin to the Faculty of Arts and Sciences.

== Academic programs ==
The Graduate School of Arts and Sciences offers many degree programs, including:

- African and African American Studies
- American Studies
- Anthropology
- Astronomy
- Bioengineering
- Biological Sciences in Public Health
- Celtic Languages and Literatures
- Chemistry and Chemical Biology
- Computer Science
- The Classics
- Comparative Literature
- Earth and Planetary Sciences
- East Asian Languages and Civilizations
- Economics
- Engineering and Applied Sciences
- English
- Germanic Languages and Literatures
- Government
- History
- History of Art and Architecture
- History of Science
- Human Evolutionary Biology
- Linguistics
- Mathematics
- Middle Eastern Studies
- Molecular and Cellular Biology
- Music
- Near Eastern Languages and Civilizations
- Organismic and Evolutionary Biology
- Philosophy
- Physics
- Psychology
- Romance Languages and Literatures
- Slavic Languages and Literatures
- Sociology
- South Asian Studies
- Statistics
- Stem Cell and Regenerative Biology

== Student life ==
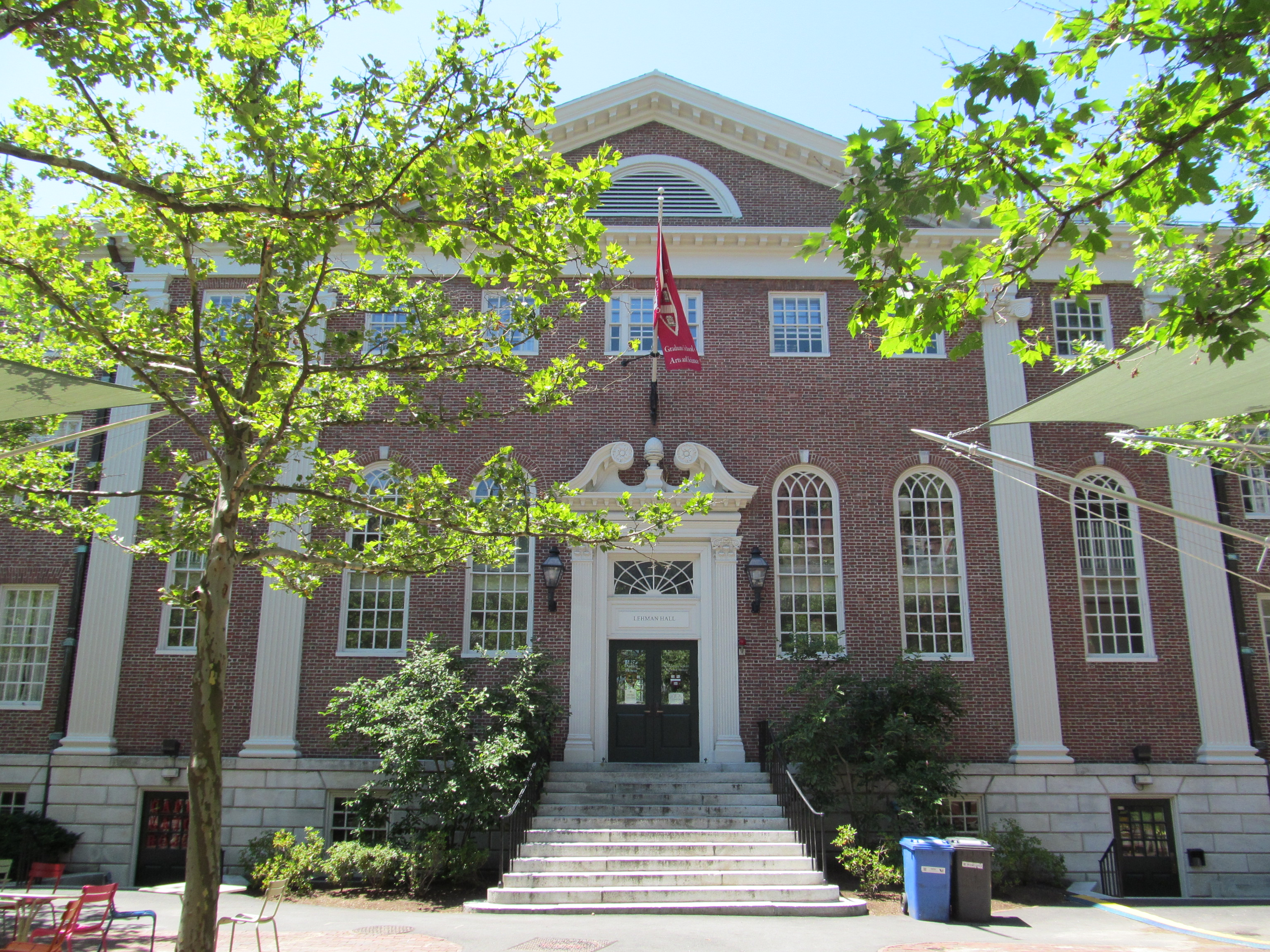
Lehman Hall is the center of GSAS student life on Harvard Yard

As of 2019, Harvard's Graduate School of Arts and Sciences had 4,521 students, with the vast majority (4,392 students) pursuing PhDs. 46% of GSAS students are women, 30% of students are international, and 12% are underrepresented minorities. 20% of GSAS students pursue degrees in humanities, 26% in social sciences, and the remaining 54% in natural sciences.

=== Financial aid ===
GSAS guarantees full funding for all PhD students for five years, which covers tuition, health fees, and living expenses. The PhD funding packages include a combination of tuition grants, stipends, traineeships, teaching fellowships, research assistantships, and other academic appointments.

== Housing ==
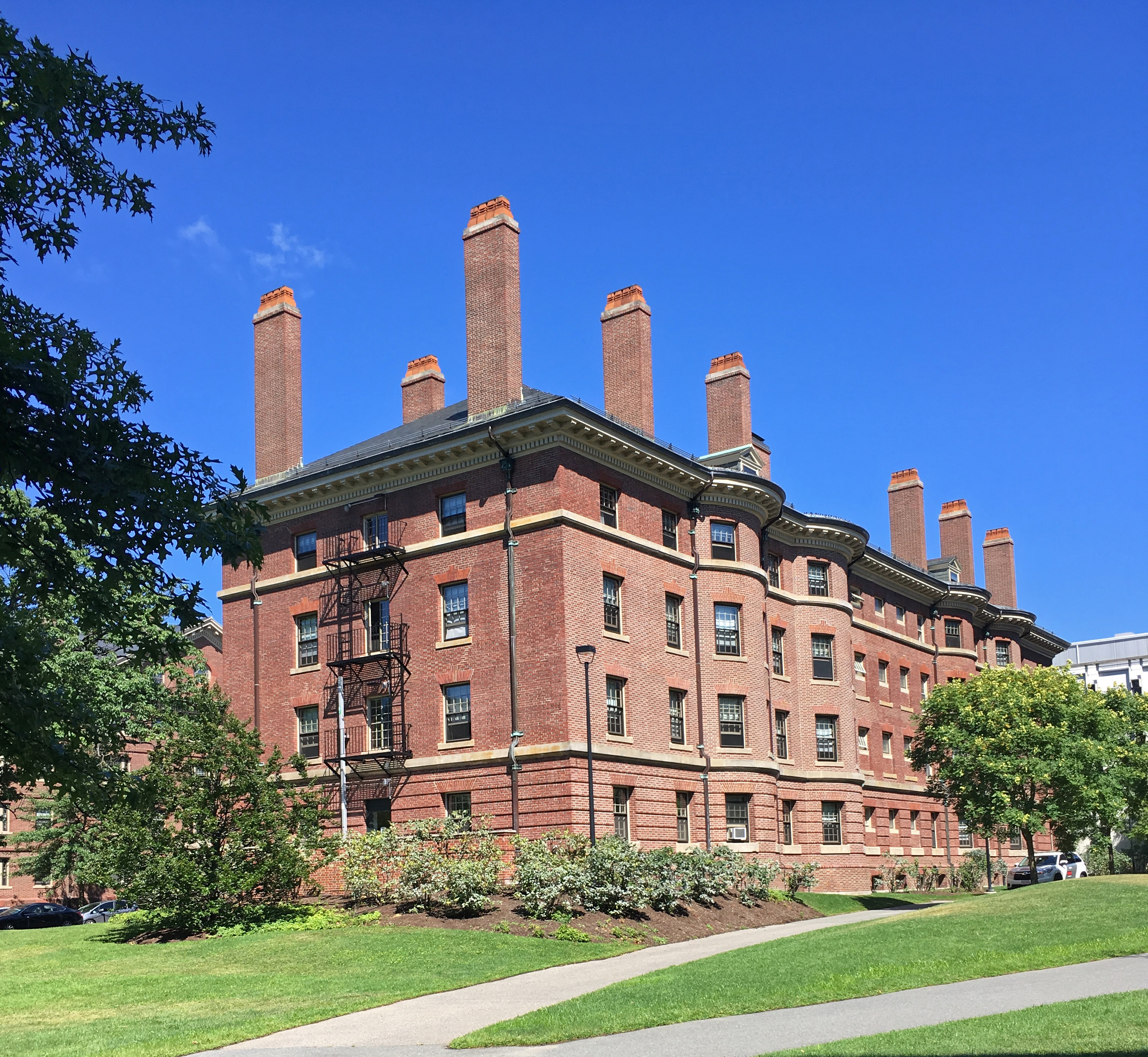
Conant Hall, as seen in 2017

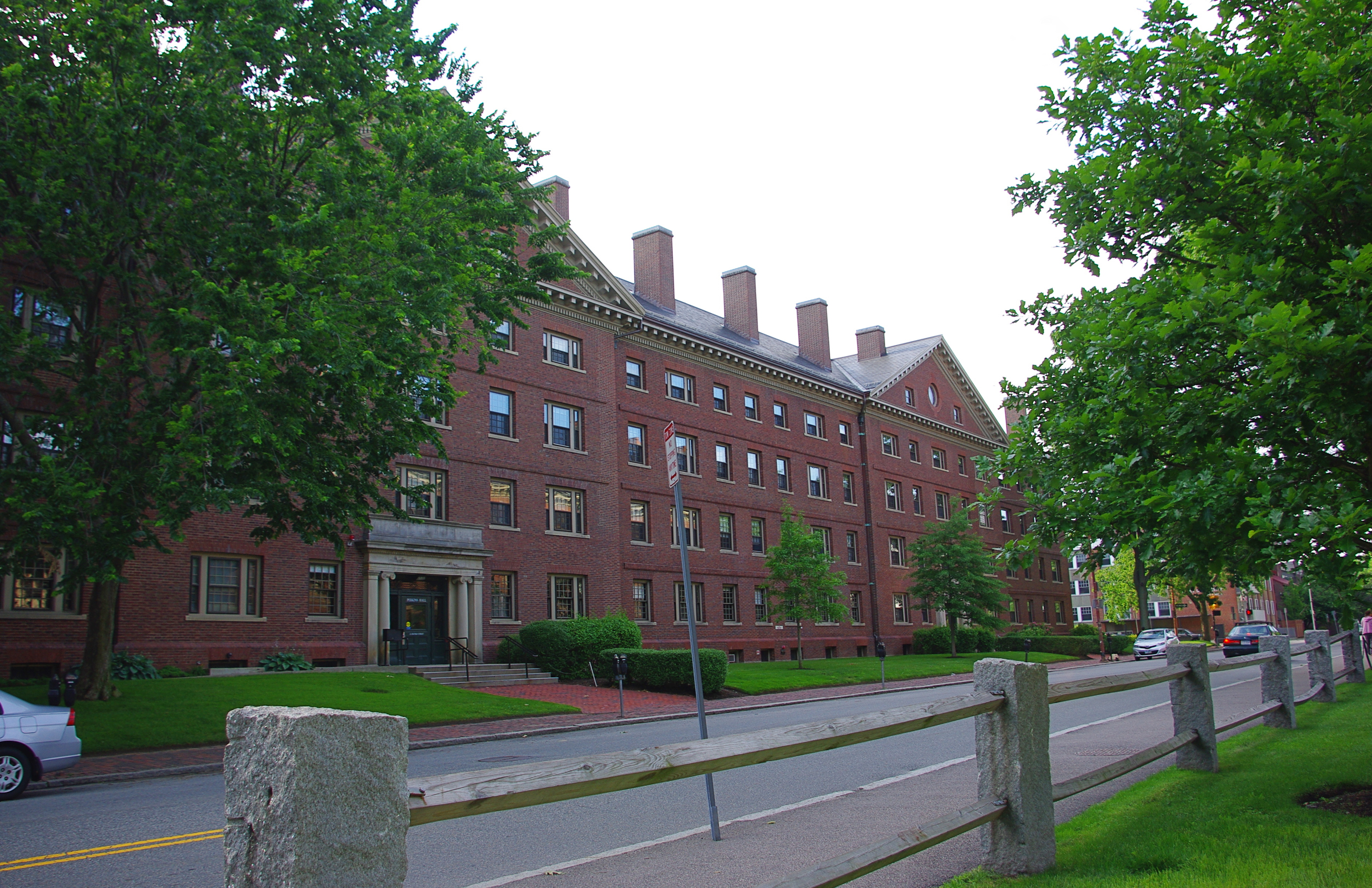
Perkins Hall, as seen in 2013

As of 2017, Harvard's GSAS guarantees housing for all first-year graduate students, as long as the students apply for accommodations by April 22. GSAS offers housing through several on-campus residence halls, as well as Harvard-owned apartments, both on and off-campus. In addition, approximately 100 GSAS students live in Harvard's undergraduate houses and freshman dorms as resident tutors and proctors. GSAS residence halls include the following:

=== Conant Hall ===
Constructed in 1894, Conant Hall was designed by Shepley, Rutan and Coolidge, reflecting the Georgian architecture of freshman residences found around Harvard Yard. It was built with funds gifted by Edwin Conant, whose name the building currently bears. Originally consisting of 29 suites, Conant has since undergone numerous renovations and currently houses 84 single rooms.

=== Perkins Hall ===
Perkins Hall was built in 1893 according to the design of Shepley, Rutan and Coolidge. Consisting of 154 single rooms, Perkins is the oldest of the GSAS residence halls currently in use at Harvard. The funds for its construction were donated by Catharine Page Perkins, the widow of an oil tycoon, in memory of her husband's family. Perkins was originally intended to house undergraduate students from modest circumstances but as the number of graduate students increased, it was converted into a graduate residence. In the early 1900s, Perkins Hall was at the center of controversy involving "homosexual activity" at Harvard, and the university administration's attempts to suppress it, an affair that later became known as the Secret Court of 1920.

=== Richards Hall and Child Hall ===
Designed by the German modernist architect Walter Gropius, Richards and Child Halls were built in 1949. Richards is named after the Nobel Prize-winning chemist Theodore Richards, while Child Hall takes its name from Francis J. Child. The two residence halls are constructed on the former Jarvis Field, where the first American football game was played in 1874. Child Hall houses approximately 100 students and Richards Hall houses over 70. The lawn space includes Richard Lippold's “World Tree” sculpture, a 27-feet-tall steel construction designed to be climbed by students.
