= Dorothea Alastair MacVane =

American opera singer

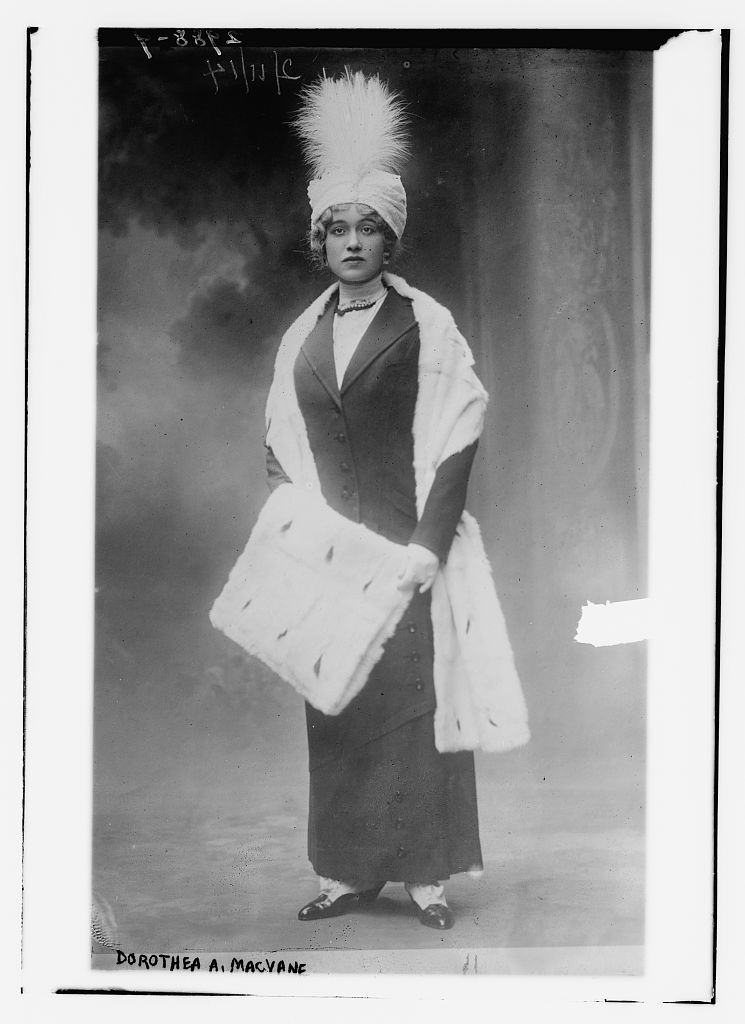
Dorothea Alastair MacVane

Dorothea Alastair MacVane (January 9, 1884 – date of death unknown) was an American opera singer.

== Biography ==
MacVane was born to professor Silas Marcus MacVane (1842–1914) of Boston, Massachusetts. He was the former McLean Professor of Ancient and Modern History at Harvard University. Her sisters were Edith MacVane and Baroness Emily Dodeman du Placy.

In 1913 she was suspected of being an American spy by the Italian government.

She married Count Bosco di Rofino and lived in Turin, where she died in the late 1970s.
