= Emma Dench =

English ancient historian, classicist, and academic administrator

- Born: 1963 (age 62–63); York, England
- Title: McLean Professor of Ancient and Modern History
- Spouse: Jonathan Bowker
- Children: 1
- Parent: Jeffery Dench (father)
- Relatives: Judi Dench (aunt); Finty Williams (cousin)

Academic background
- Education: Wadham College, Oxford (MA); St Hugh's College, Oxford (DPhil)
- Thesis: Peoples of the Central Appennines in Roman Ideology to c. 80 B.C. (1993)

Academic work
- Discipline: Classics
- Sub-discipline: History of Rome; Roman Empire; Roman imperialism; Identity in classical antiquity
- Institutions: Hobart and William Smith Colleges; Birkbeck College, University of London; Harvard University

Emma Dench (born 1963) is an English ancient historian, classicist, and academic administrator. She has been McLean Professor of Ancient and Modern History at Harvard University since 2014, and the dean of its Graduate School of Arts and Sciences since 2018. She was previously a professor of ancient history at Birkbeck, University of London and a professor of classics and history at Harvard.

== Early life and education ==
Dench was born in 1963 in York, Yorkshire, England, and grew up near Stratford-upon-Avon, Warwickshire. Her father was Jeffery Dench, a Shakespearean actor, and her mother, Betty, was a speech therapist. Her paternal aunt is Judi Dench, an award-winning stage and film actress. Emma appeared in the 1968 film version of A Midsummer Night's Dream as Peaseblossom alongside her aunt, who played Titania.

Dench studied classics at Wadham College, Oxford: she achieved a first in Honour Moderations in 1984, and graduated from the University of Oxford with a double first class Bachelor of Arts (BA) degree in 1987. As per tradition, her BA was promoted to a Master of Arts (MA Oxon) degree in 1989. She then undertook postgraduate research in ancient history at St Hugh's College, Oxford. She held the Craven Fellowship at Oxford from 1989 to 1991, and was Rome Scholar at the British School at Rome from 1991 to 1992. She completed her Doctor of Philosophy (DPhil) degree in 1993; her thesis was titled Peoples of the Central Appennines in Roman Ideology to c. 80 B.C..

== Academic career ==
Dench began her academic career with just an undergraduate degree. From 1987 to 1988, between graduating with her bachelor's degree and starting her doctorate, she taught classics at Hobart and William Smith Colleges in New York, United States.

In 1992, Dench joined the faculty of Birkbeck College, University of London. She was a lecturer in ancient history between 1992 and 1998, and then, having been promoted, was a senior lecturer between 1998 and 2004. In 2002/2003 academic year, she was a member of the School of Historical Studies at the Institute for Advanced Study, Princeton, New Jersey. She was appointed a Reader in 2004, and Professor of Ancient History in 2005. In the 2005/2006 academic year, she was a visiting professor of the classics and of history at Harvard University. From 2007 to 2009, she maintained a link with Birkbeck as a research professor.

On 1 January 2007, Dench moved to the United States to join the faculty of Harvard University. From 2007 to 2015, she was Professor of Classics and of History. She was also a Harvard College Professor between 2010 and 2015; it is a title of honour awarded for "outstanding contributions to undergraduate teaching, mentoring and advising". For the 2015/2016 academic year, she was a visiting professor of business administration at Harvard Business School. In November 2015, she was appointed McLean Professor of Ancient and Modern History. In 2017, she was named Interim Dean of the Graduate School of Arts and Sciences (GSAS) for the 2017/2018 academic year, and was appointed GSAS Dean on 1 July 2018 (since 2023, the GSAS is known as Kenneth C. Griffin Graduate School of Arts and Sciences).

Dench holds a number of appointments outside of her university faculty positions. She is on the executive committee for Harvard University of the Center for Hellenic Studies in Washington, D.C. She held a Loeb Classical Library Foundation Fellowship between 2011 and 2012. From 2013 to 2015, she was a member of the Program Committee of the American Philological Association. She delivered the Grey Lectures, titled "Agreeing to differ: consensus, culture and politics in the Roman empire", at the University of Cambridge in May 2016.

== Personal life ==
Dench is a British citizen and a permanent resident of the United States.

Dench is married to Jonathan Bowker, an artist. Together they have a son, Jacob.

== Selected works ==
- Dench, Emma (1995). From Barbarians to New Men: Greek, Roman, and Modern Perceptions of Peoples from the Central Apennines. Oxford: Clarendon Press. ISBN 978-0198150213.
- Dench, Emma (2005). Romulus' Asylum: Roman Identities from the Age of Alexander to the Age of Hadrian. Oxford: Oxford University Press. ISBN 978-0198150510.
- Dench, Emma (2018). Empire and Political Cultures in the Roman World. Cambridge: Cambridge University Press. ISBN 978-0521810722.

Academic offices
Preceded by Steven Ozment	McLean Professor of Ancient and Modern History; Harvard University; 2015 to present	Incumbent
