= Peter Stearns =

American historian (born 1936)

Peter N. Stearns KBE
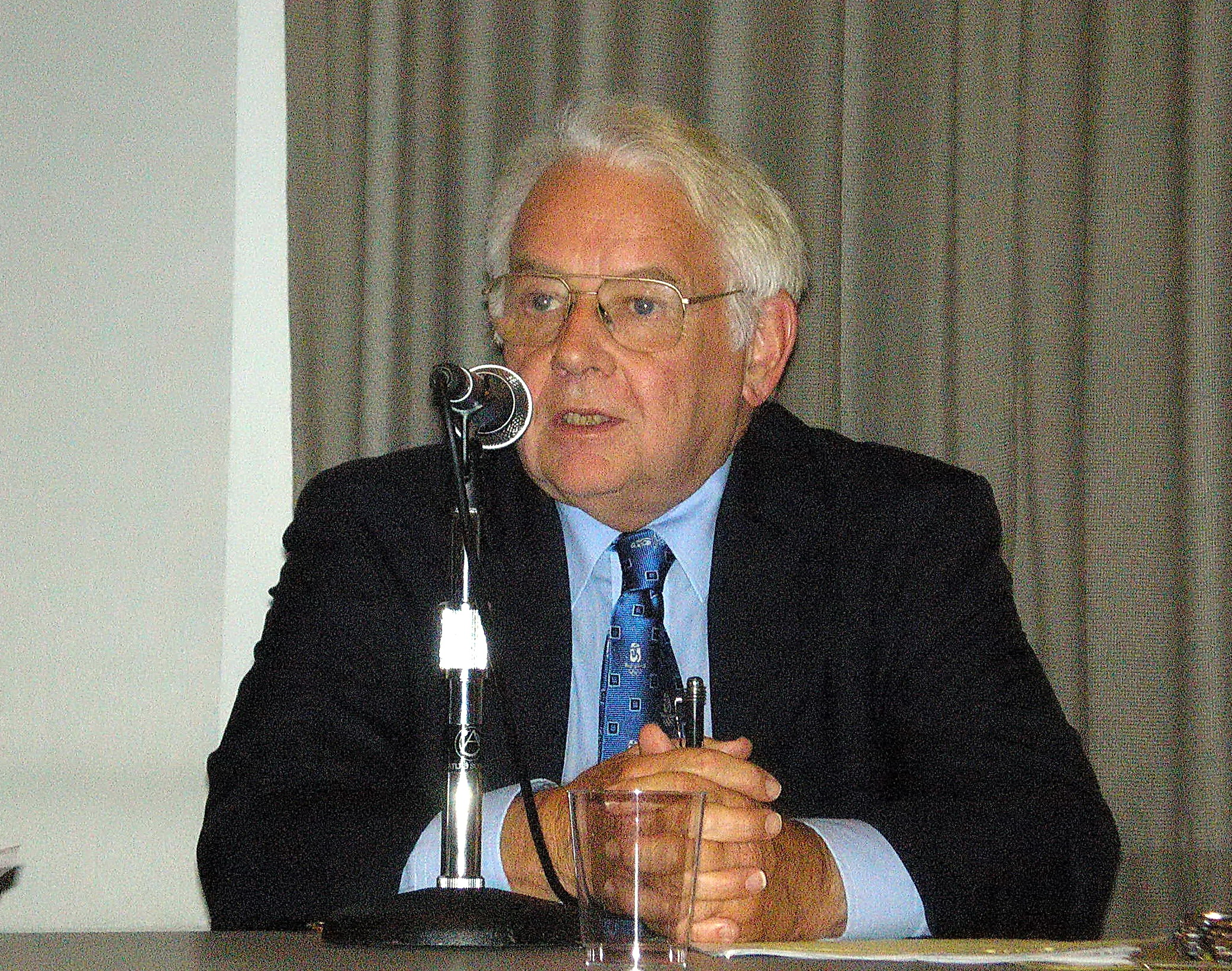
- Born: Peter Nathaniel Stearns; March 3, 1936 (age 90); London, England
- Education: Harvard University
- Occupation: Professor
- Spouse: Donna Kidd
- Children: Duncan Stearns, Deborah Stearns, Clio Stearns, Cordelia Stearns
- Writing career
- Genres: History, children's history, world history
- Notable awards: Mason Medal; Senator Paul Simon Spotlight Award

Peter Nathaniel Stearns (born March 3, 1936) is a professor at George Mason University, where he was provost from January 1, 2000 to July 2014.

Stearns was chair of the Department of History at Carnegie Mellon University and also served as the Dean of the College of Humanities and Social Sciences (now named Dietrich College of Humanities and Social Sciences) at Carnegie Mellon University. In addition, he founded and edited the Journal of Social History. While at Carnegie Mellon, he developed a pioneering approach to teaching World History, and has contributed to the field as well through editing, and contributing to, the Routledge series, Themes in World History. He is also known for various work on the nature and impact of the industrial revolution and for exploration of new topics, particularly in the history of emotions.

He is active in historical groups such as the Society for French Historical Studies, the American Historical Association, the Social Science History Association and the International Society for Research on Emotion.

== Early life ==
Peter Stearns was born in London, but of American parents (Raymond and Elizabeth) and was an American citizen at birth. He was raised in Urbana, Illinois and attended public grade school and then the University of Illinois High School. After graduating from Harvard College, summa cum laude, he had a traveling fellowship in Europe and then returned to complete his PhD at Harvard. He has four children and a stepson, and seven grandchildren. He has held positions at the University of Chicago, Rutgers, Carnegie Mellon, and now George Mason.

== Education and career ==
He attended Harvard College and later received his Ph.D. from Harvard University. In his prolific career as an author and editor, he has written or edited over 135 different books. Stearns served as founding chair of the Advanced Placement World History committee and as vice president for teaching of the American Historical Association.

== Theoretical work ==
=== Emotionology ===
Carol Zisowitz Stearns along with her husband Peter were critical of the study of emotions in the field of cultural anthropology because of its overemphasis of the notion that due to their biological and physiological features, emotion can be regarded as a human quality invariant across cultures. Contrary to this bias, their shared view is that emotion is partly cognitive and thus a social phenomenon, so that the forms and conceptions of a single emotion and possibly also its prevalence can vary significantly between communities as well as within one and the same society. In response to the biology vs. culture problem, the Stearns coined the term emotionology by which they refer to the standards according to which emotions are evaluated and the institutions that reflect and promote these standards are developed by different societies. Emotionology is not the same as emotional experience; rather it defines the social norms establishing how one should feel in a given situation. According to this view, emotionological standards also affect the emotional experience itself by shaping articulated expectations.

== Works ==
His books include:

- 1848: The Revolutionary Tide in Europe, Norton, 1974
- American Behavioral History
- American Cool: Constructing a Twentieth-century Emotional Style. NYU Press. 1994. ISBN 978-0-8147-7996-5.
- Anxious Parents: A History of Modern Childrearing in America. NYU Press. November 1, 2004. ISBN 978-0-8147-9849-2.
- Zisowitz-Stearns, Carol; Stearns, Peter N. (1989). Anger: The Struggle for Emotional Control in America's History. University of Chicago Press. ISBN 978-0-226-77152-6.
- Battleground of Desire
- Childhood in World History. Routledge. May 2, 2006. pp. 2–. ISBN 978-1-134-26260-1.
- Consumerism in World History: The Global Transformation of Desire. Routledge. April 18, 2006. pp. 2–. ISBN 978-1-134-15677-1.
- Cultural Change in Modern World History
- Cultures in Motion
- Debating the Industrial Revolution (2015)
- Documents in World History
- Emotion and Social Change
- Encyclopedia of European Social History
- The Encyclopedia of World History
- Fat History: Bodies and Beauty in the Modern West. NYU Press. September 1, 2002. ISBN 978-0-8147-3982-2.
- Gender in World History. Routledge. April 18, 2006. pp. 3–. ISBN 978-1-134-15669-6.
- Global Outrage
- Globalization in World History. Routledge. October 20, 2009. ISBN 978-1-135-25993-8.
- Growing Up: The History of Childhood in a Global Context. Baylor University Press. January 1, 2005. ISBN 978-1-932792-28-7.
- Guiding the American University: Challenges and Choices (2015)
- History of Shame (2017)
- Time in World History (2019)
- Human Rights in World History. Routledge. May 4, 2012. ISBN 978-1-136-31812-2.
- The Industrial Revolution in World History. Westview Press. August 7, 2012. ISBN 978-0-8133-4730-1.
- Knowing, Teaching, and Learning History: National and International Perspectives
- Lives of Labour: Work in a Maturing Industrial Society (1975)
- Peace in World History. Taylor & Francis. April 3, 2014. ISBN 978-1-134-75721-3.
- Peacebuilding Through Dialogue: Education, Human Transformation, and Conflict Resolution. George Mason University Press in collaboration with the Ikeda Center. December 2018. ISBN 978-1-942695-11-0.
- Satisfaction Not Guaranteed: Dilemmas of Progress in Modern Society. NYU Press. April 30, 2012. ISBN 978-0-8147-8855-4.
- Sexuality in World History. Routledge. February 18, 2009. pp. 3–. ISBN 978-1-135-96896-0.
- The Industrial Turn in World History (2016)
- The Revolutions of 1848 (1974)
- Tolerance in World History
- Western Civilization in World History. Routledge. January 28, 2008. pp. 1–. ISBN 978-1-134-37475-5.
- World Civilizations
- World History in Brief
- World History: Patterns of Change and Continuity

== See also ==
- List of Carnegie Mellon University people
- List of Harvard University people
- List of historians
- List of people from Virginia
