= Ethel Dench Puffer Howes =

American psychologist

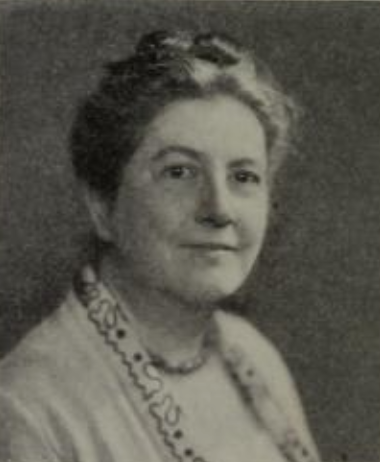
- Ethel Puffer Howes, from a 1925 publication
- Born: 10 October 1872; Framingham, Massachusetts
- Died: 1950 (aged 77–78); Washington, D.C.
- Occupations: Psychologist, college professor, suffragist, feminist organizer

Ethel Dench Puffer Howes (10 October 1872 – 1950) was an American psychologist, suffragist, and college professor. She taught at Wellesley College, Smith College, and Simmons College. She was Executive Secretary of the National College Equal Suffrage League, and founder of the Institute for the Coordination of Women's Interests at Smith College.

== Early life and education ==
Ethel Dench Puffer was born to George and Ella Puffer in Framingham, Massachusetts on October 10, 1872, the eldest child in a family of four daughters. Both her mother and her aunt had gone to college, and Puffer and her sisters would also attend college. All four Puffer sisters graduated from Smith College, and two went on to earn doctoral degrees. Puffer completed her undergraduate degree at Smith College in 1891 at age 19, after which she taught high school in Keene, New Hampshire, where she met her future husband, who was a student at that time.

== Psychology ==
After teaching high school for a year in Keene, Ethel Puffer returned to Smith College as a mathematics instructor, but soon found herself becoming increasingly interested in psychology. In 1895, she traveled to Germany to pursue education in the newly formed field, and was met instantaneously with the logistical obstacles set in place to keep women from enrolling in graduate courses. Letters to her mother reveal the persistence Puffer employed to ensure her place at the University of Berlin, which included pursuing meetings with professors, ministers and rectors at their homes on the weekend to request permission to attend classes.

She managed to officially enroll herself, though not before surreptitiously attending her first day of classes without full permission. Her poor living situation, the punitive societal reaction against American women in Berlin, and her lackluster program of study became increasingly disheartening and stressful for Puffer, so when a classmate recommended she pursue her studies under Hugo Münsterberg at the University of Freiburg, she jumped at the opportunity to transfer.

According to the letters Puffer sent to her mother during the academic year of 1896-1897, she thrived both academically and socially in Freiburg as an adopted member of the Münsterberg family. Her mornings were spent diligently conducting her research with Münsterberg in the family parlor, always in the presence of Mrs. Münsterberg, painting at the other end of the room, as Puffer was quick to point out to her scandalized mother. She took classes at the reportedly dilapidated University building as well, and spent her holidays attending the raucous parties of the Freiburg elite. When the opportunity arose to apply for a prestigious award from the Association of Collegiate Alumnae to fund her dissertation research, Münsterberg encouraged her to do so and wrote her a glowing recommendation, comparing her superior intellectual abilities to Mary Whiton Calkins, the only other prominent female psychologist at that time. Puffer won the award and returned to the U.S. to continue her studies in 1897, following Münsterberg to Harvard where he was to take over the psychology laboratory from William James. Puffer completed her doctoral work in 1898.

Despite the glowing recommendations of eight Harvard professors, attesting to Puffer's academic excellence and completion of the coursework for the degree, she was never granted a Harvard Ph.D. She waited 3 years after completing her doctoral work and finally wrote letters to the dean of Radcliffe College inquiring whether the college would be willing to confer her the Ph.D., especially considering her prior enrollment in the school, and they obliged. They also offered the Radcliffe Ph.D. to three other female psychologists who had completed their doctoral studies at Harvard, including Mary Whiton Calkins, who refused on the grounds that she had never been enrolled at Radcliffe and opted to hold out for a Harvard degree that was never conferred (and has not been, to this day, despite continued protests).

== Scholarly career ==
The ideal life must be that in which every act has a meaning for the whole, in which every purpose comes to fruition. Life is a unity, and responsibility is its matchword: for responsibility means obligation, a bond, one part of life answering to another part, a close-woven texture.

— Puffer-Howes, January 18. (Howes 1920a)

Puffer's academic career in the field of psychology lasted for a decade after her doctoral studies concluded, in which she taught at colleges for women, including Wellesley, Smith and Simmons. Puffer also held a concurrent position as a laboratory assistant. Of note, she was instead listed in the Radcliffe faculty catalogue, for fear of setting a "dangerous precedent" for Harvard if they chose to acknowledge having hired a woman to hold such a position.

Puffer published her doctoral research as a book titled The Psychology of Beauty in 1905 and wrote articles in the tradition of her teacher, Hugo Münsterberg, a proponent of extending the audience for psychological research to laypeople outside of the field. Meanwhile, at Wellesley, she was among a female academic elite who shared her belief that higher education for women was an avenue not only for individual women to find fulfilling purpose in their lives, but also to expand the roles of women in society and overcome institutionalized sexism. Her position within this social movement shifted dramatically in 1908 when she accepted the marriage proposal of Benjamin Howes who had recently completed his graduate work in civil engineering at the Massachusetts Institute of Technology and had become an expert in construction.

== Marriage vs. career ==
After marrying Benjamin Howes in August 1908, Ethel Dench Puffer Howes, as she was now known, ran into another major obstacle for women in academia around the start of the 20th century: the staunchly held convention that married women should not be employed, particularly not full-time. While it is not clear whether she left her position at Wellesley voluntarily or was asked to resign, she nevertheless continued to seek out academic positions, but found herself stymied by her status as a married woman. For example, the President of Smith College wrote to warn her that news of her engagement had led him to rescind his recommendation of her application to become a faculty member at Barnard College.

For the following few years, Puffer Howes struggled to fit her academic pursuits into her new life as a domestic partner with responsibility for the maintenance of a household, made all the more difficult by frequent relocations necessary for advancing her husband's career. Though Benjamin Howes proved atypical in his willingness to help his wife by cooking and cleaning when she needed time to complete scholarly articles, the pull of her domestic life became ever stronger when the couple had two children, a daughter, Ellen, in 1915, and a son, Benjamin, in 1917. Puffer Howes was in her forties at that time, and the compounded demands on her time and attention from raising the children to fulfilling household and social duties effectively ended her academic career. Puffer Howes turned her attention to social activism and began a second career as a prominent feminist organizer.

== Feminism ==
Puffer Howes had positioned herself as a leader in the suffrage movement as the Executive Secretary of the National College Equal Suffrage League in 1914 just before her daughter was born. During World War I, she also assisted in organizing the Women's Land Army, to substitute women workers in agriculture while the men were away at war. In the early 1920s, she wrote two articles for The Atlantic Monthly regarding the impossible position women scholars found themselves in upon marrying or having children. In doing so, she gave voice to her disenchantment with the social structure imposed on women by institutions that would not hire wives and mothers, as well as on the utter lack of support for mothers in maintaining professional focus while raising children. These articles provided what could be considered a mission statement for the rest of her life's work:

Unmarried women, limited in numbers and in contacts with life, cannot charge the citadel of professional privilege in sufficient volume and momentum to carry it. Until all women of ability, in the sense in which it may be said of all men of ability, are in action, it is probable that few women will reach the highest, and the avenues will remain obstructed. - Ethel Puffer Howes, Accepting the Universe

In The meaning of progress in the women movement, Puffer Howes proposed that suffrage had not gone far enough in providing women with the tools to lead fulfilling and productive lives, and nothing less than a new social order would do so. Shortly thereafter, she wrote articles and collected data through the Woman's Home Companion on cooperative community strategies that were being developed to share the burdens of housework and raising children. In running contests such as "The Most Practical Plan for Cooperative Home Service in Our Town," Puffer Howes was able to study the effectiveness of cooperative solutions while simultaneously promoting the idea among the magazine's subscribers, the very housewives Puffer Howes hoped would "charge the citadel of professional privilege" in concert with the current cohort of women seeking higher education in college and graduate schools. It was the most successful campaign thus far for organizing cooperate services for the benefit of women. In 1923, Puffer Howes became the chair of the committee on Cooperative Home Service for the American Association of University Women.

These studies, articles, and organizational positions became the foundation for the Smith College Institute for the Coordination of Women's Interests, which Puffer Howes developed and ran from 1925 to 1931, with a grant she procured from the Laura Spelman Rockefeller Memorial. Through the Institute for the Coordination of Women's Interests, Puffer Howes created a think-tank of experts from a variety of fields whose work had the potential to greatly influence the social structures in place that kept women from professional activities and satisfying careers. These specialists included top researchers in architecture, history, and home economics; as well as career guidance, childcare, and kindergarten and nursery school experts. In 1928, the institute hosted a cooperative kitchen, which provided meals to people in the community, and which became a part of a larger exhibition of a viable community house that was sent to New York to be put on display.

The institute was also used to coordinate the Smith College Day and Nursery School cooperative, a cooperative childcare demonstration model.

Puffer Howes was in her fifties during the era of the Institute, and her grueling lecture tours and organizational work required her to travel long distances from home every week. She herself had to coordinate her interests through careful planning: balancing motherhood, household responsibilities, and her career.

Despite her best efforts, the Institute was phased out of existence when the Rockefeller Foundation chose not to renew its grant, reportedly because the Institute focused too much on developing practical applications and not enough on research. Smith College also failed to incorporate the Institute's research and programming into its curriculum, due to the controversial nature of its work, which many of the faculty members did not support, but the college nonetheless provided funding for the final two years in order for Puffer Howes to attempt to complete her research. On a larger scale, Hayden asserted that the insatiable greed of the newly energized manufacturing sector, built up to support the war efforts, played the largest role in dismantling the cooperative system Puffer Howes had begun to establish and encourage among American housewives and female professionals. The Woman's Home Companion itself turned against the cooperative movement as its advertisers pushed personal home appliances as the solution to the domestic demands on housewives. In "The Second Stage," Friedan also correlates the failure of the Smith College Institute for the Coordination of Women's Interest with the Red Scare following World War I, in which labor unions, cooperatives, and feminists in general were held suspect by an unnerved capitalist military–industrial complex.

== Last years ==
After the Institute dissolved, the Howes moved to Washington, D.C. in the 1930s, where Benjamin Howes' expertise in civil engineering secured him appointments to federal housing committees (including an appointment as chief of the U.S. Housing Authority and Public Housing Administration). Ethel Puffer Howes, meanwhile, spent her time in Washington on civic activities. The couple moved to Connecticut to live with their son, Benjamin Howes, in the 1940s, and in 1950, at the age of 78, Ethel Puffer Howes died. Her husband died 18 months later.

== Published works ==
- Puffer, E. D. (1905) The Psychology of Beauty. Boston: Houghton Mifflin.
- Howes, E. P. (1914). Aesthetics. Psychological Bulletin, 11, 196-201.
- Howes, E. P. (1922). Accepting the universe Atlantic Monthly, 129, 444-53.
- Howes, E. P. (1922). Continuity for Women. Atlantic Monthly, 130, 731-39.
- Howes, E. P. (1923). True and Substantial Happiness. Women's Home Companion, Dec.
- Howes, E. P. (1929). The meaning of progress in the women movement. Annals of the American Academy of Political and Social Science, 143, 14-20.
- Howes, E. P. (1937). The Golden Age. Radcliffe Quarterly, 21, 14-16.
