= Jeffery Dench =

English actor (1928–2014)

- Born: Jeffery Danny Dench; 29 April 1928; Tyldesley, Lancashire, England
- Died: 25 March 2014 (aged 85); Birmingham, England
- Education: Royal Central School of Speech and Drama
- Occupation: Actor
- Spouses: Betty Martin (m. 1953; died 2002) Ann Curtis (m. 2005)
- Children: 3, including Emma Dench
- Relatives: Judi Dench (sister); Finty Williams (niece); Rebekah Elmaloglou (cousin); Sebastian Elmaloglou (cousin); Oliver Dench (grandson)

Jeffery Danny Dench (29 April 1928 – 25 March 2014) was an English actor, best known for his work with the Royal Shakespeare Company. He was the older brother of actress Dame Judi Dench.

== Personal life ==
Jeffery Dench was born, on 29 April 1928 in Tyldesley, Lancashire, to Eleanora Olave (known as Olave) (née Jones), a native of Dublin, and Reginald Arthur Dench, a physician who met his future wife while studying medicine at Trinity College Dublin. He lived in Tyldesley with his brother Peter; later the family moved to York where his sister, Judith, was born.

Dench attended St Peter's, York, where he began acting with the role of Cleopatra in George Bernard Shaw's Caesar and Cleopatra.

He carried out his national service at an army theatre in Catterick before attending the Central School of Speech and Drama. It was here that he met Betty, his first wife, who was working as a speech therapist. He moved to Clifford Chambers and joined the Royal Shakespeare Company in 1963, where he worked for many years.

With his wife Betty, Dench had three daughters, including Emma, a Roman historian.

Betty died from a heart attack on 11 January 2002. Dench then married Ann Curtis, a costume designer for the RSC and a longtime family friend. They lived in Stratford-upon-Avon. In 2012 he became the President of Stratford-upon-Avon Choral Society.

On 27 March 2014 it was announced that Jeffery Dench had died. Writing after his death, Sylvia Morris said:

When not playing grotesque old men, he brought humour, warmth and integrity to his parts. As a member of the audience, seeing Jeffery Dench's name on the cast list was a guarantee of quality. Shakespeare did write brilliant leading roles for Burbage and others, but he also wrote for a known company of talented professionals. The RSC has been fortunate to have among its regulars a number of high-quality actors, safe hands that could carry the plays along with distinction. Jeffery Dench was one of those, and if there were to be a late twentieth-century version of the page in the First Folio 'The Names of the Principal Actors in all These Plays', his name would be on the list.

The RSC's artistic director, Gregory Doran, said he was, "the kind of actor that made the RSC what it is: he did not necessarily always play the leading roles, but proved by his presence that the company’s vitality lies in its strength in depth".

== Selected acting credits ==
=== Film ===
Year	Title	Role	Notes
1995	First Knight	Elder #1	

=== Television ===
Year	Programme	Role	Other notes
1955	BBC Sunday Night Theatre – The Merchant of Venice	Launcelot Gobbo	
1982	The Life and Adventures of Nicholas Nickleby	Mr. Cutler/Landlord/Mr. Blightey/Arthur Gride	Mini Series of RSC production
1985	Cyrano de Bergerac	Marquis 1	
1986	What a Way to Run a Revolution		
1987	Rumpole of the Bailey	Denis Driscoll	Appeared in one episode, entitled Rumpole and the Old, Old Story
1989	The Lady and the Highwayman	Magistrate	
1996	The Brittas Empire	Warwick Newmark	1 episode, Surviving Christmas
2000	Empires: The Greeks - Crucible of Civilization	Pericles	Uncredited

=== Stage ===
Year	Play	Role	Theatre
1964	Henry IV Part 1 by William Shakespeare	Richard Scrope, Archbishop of York	Royal Shakespeare Theatre, Stratford-upon-Avon
1965	Hamlet by William Shakespeare	Marcellus/Ambassador from England	Aldwych Theatre, London
1969/71/72	Twelfth Night by William Shakespeare	Andrew Aguecheek	Royal Shakespeare Theatre, Stratford-upon-Avon
1982	The Tempest by William Shakespeare	Sebastian	Royal Shakespeare Theatre, Stratford-upon-Avon
1971	Toad of Toad Hall by A. A. Milne	Ratty	Royal Shakespeare Theatre, Stratford-upon-Avon
2002	Henry V – The Battle of Agincourt by William Shakespeare, adapted by John Barton	Chorus	Various, including King Edward VI School
2006	Merry Wives – The Musical by William Shakespeare	Robert Shallow	Royal Shakespeare Theatre, Stratford-upon-Avon
