= Jared Sparks =

American historian, educator, and Unitarian minister (1789–1866)

The Reverend Jared Sparks
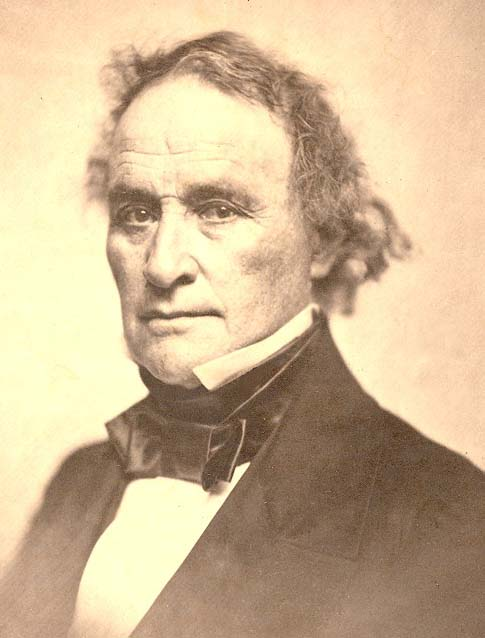

17th President of Harvard College
- In office 1849–1853
- Preceded by: Edward Everett
- Succeeded by: James Walker

1st McLean Professor of Ancient and Modern History Harvard College
- In office 1838–1849

16th Chaplain of the United States House of Representatives
- In office December 10, 1821 – December 5, 1822
- Preceded by: John Nicholson Campbell
- Succeeded by: John Brackenridge, D.D.

Personal details
- Born: May 10, 1789 Willington, Connecticut
- Died: March 14, 1866 (aged 76) Cambridge, Massachusetts
- Spouse(s): 1832, Frances Ann Allen, d. 1835. 1839, Mary Crowninshield Silsbee.
- Education: Harvard College
- Profession: Historian, educator, and minister

Jared Sparks (May 10, 1789 – March 14, 1866) was an American historian, educator, and Unitarian minister. He served as President of Harvard College from 1849 to 1853.

== Biography ==
Born in Willington, Connecticut, Sparks studied in the common schools, worked for a time at the carpenter's trade, and then became a schoolteacher. In 1809–1811, he attended the Phillips Exeter Academy, where he met John G. Palfrey, who became a lifelong friend.

He graduated from Harvard College, (now Harvard University), with an A.B. in 1815, and an A.M. in 1818. While an undergraduate, Sparks was a member of the Hasty Pudding. In 1812, he served as a tutor to the children of a family in Havre de Grace, Maryland. A few years later he taught in a private school at Lancaster, Massachusetts during 1815–1817. Sparks also studied theology and was college tutor in mathematics and natural philosophy at Harvard College in 1817–1819. In 1817–1818 he was acting editor of the North American Review.

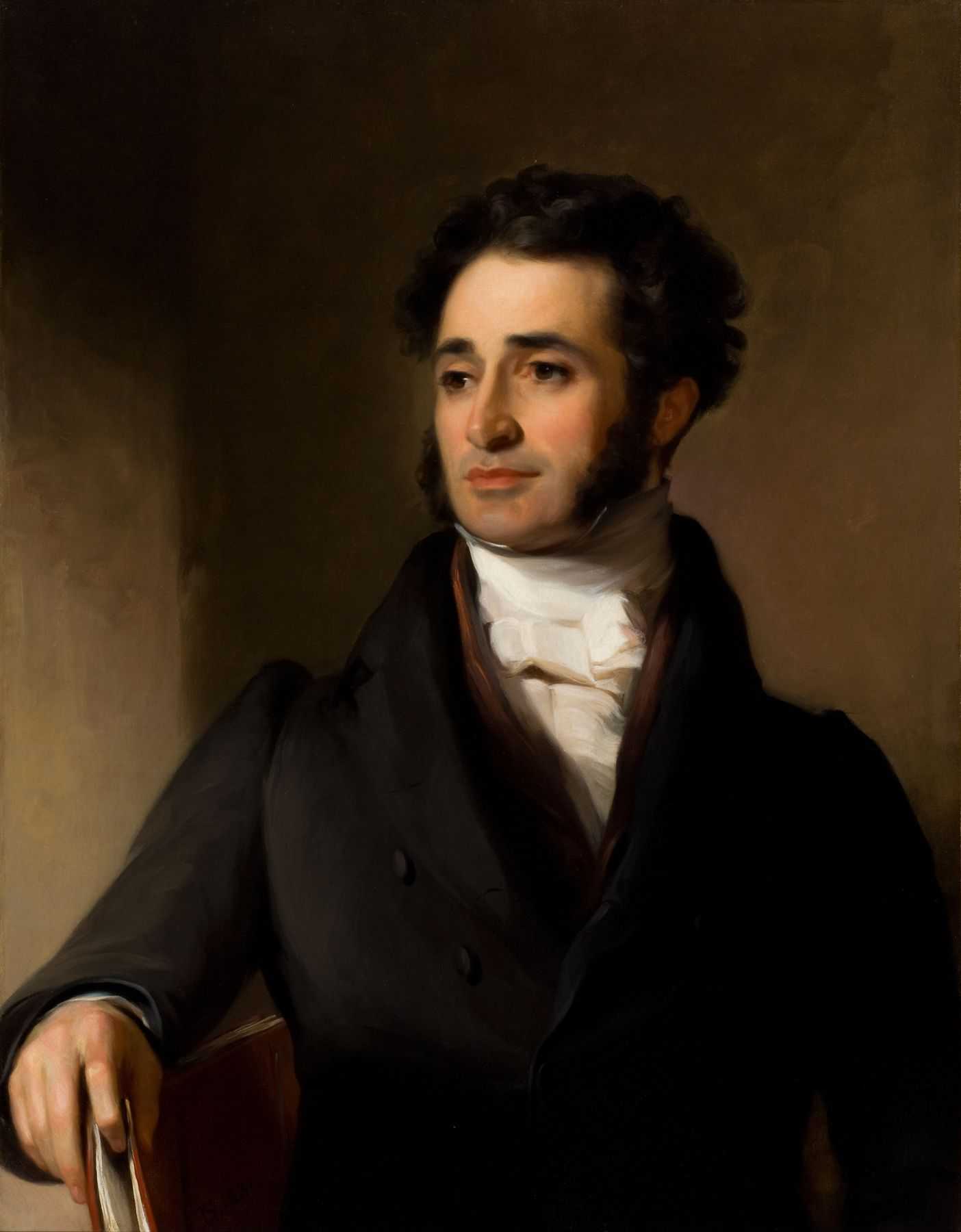
Jared Sparks, Thomas Sully, 1831

He was the first pastor of the newly organized "First Independent Church of Baltimore", serving from 1819 to 1823. It occupied what became a landmark structure at West Franklin and North Charles streets. It later was known as the First Unitarian Church of Baltimore (Unitarian and Universalist) after a 1935 merger with the Second Universalist Church at Guilford Avenue and East Lanvale Street.

At Sparks' ordination by Dr. William Ellery Channing (1780-1842), of the Federal Street Church in Boston, Massachusetts, Channing delivered his discourse on Unitarian Christianity. This later was known as "The Baltimore Sermon". It set out the tenets and some principles for the developing theology and philosophy of Unitarianism. By 1825, these principles led to the founding of the American Unitarian Association. (In 1961 a merger between two groups resulted in the modern Unitarian Universalist Association of America.)

During this period, Sparks founded the Unitarian Miscellany and Christian Monitor (1821), a monthly, and edited its first three volumes. He served as chaplain of the United States House of Representatives from 1821 to 1823; and he contributed to the National Intelligencer and other periodicals.

In 1823, his health failed and Sparks withdrew from the ministry. Removing to Boston, he bought and edited in 1824–1830 the North American Review, contributing about 50 articles to it. He founded and edited in 1830, the American Almanac and Repository of Useful Knowledge, which was continued by others and long remained a popular annual.

In 1825 Sparks was elected as a Fellow of the American Academy of Arts and Sciences, and in 1827 as a member of the American Antiquarian Society. He later served two decades as the society's secretary for foreign correspondence, from 1846 to 1866.

After extensive researches at home and in London and Paris in 1828–1829, he published The Writings of George Washington (12 volumes, 1834–1837; redated 1842), his most important work. In 1839 he published separately his Life of George Washington (abridged, 2 volumes, 1842). The work was for the most part favorably received, but Sparks was severely criticized by Lord Mahon (in the sixth volume of his History of England) and others for altering the text of some of Washington's writings.

Sparks defended his methods in A Reply to the Strictures of Lord Mahon and Others (1852). The charges were not wholly justifiable, and later Lord Mahon (Stanhope) modified them.

While continuing his studies abroad in 1840–1841, Sparks discovered in the French archives the red-line map that, in 1842 gained international prominence in connection with the dispute over the north-eastern U.S.-Canadian boundary. Conflict had resulted in the Aroostook War between the state of Maine in the United States and the Province of New Brunswick in Canada.

=== Professorship ===
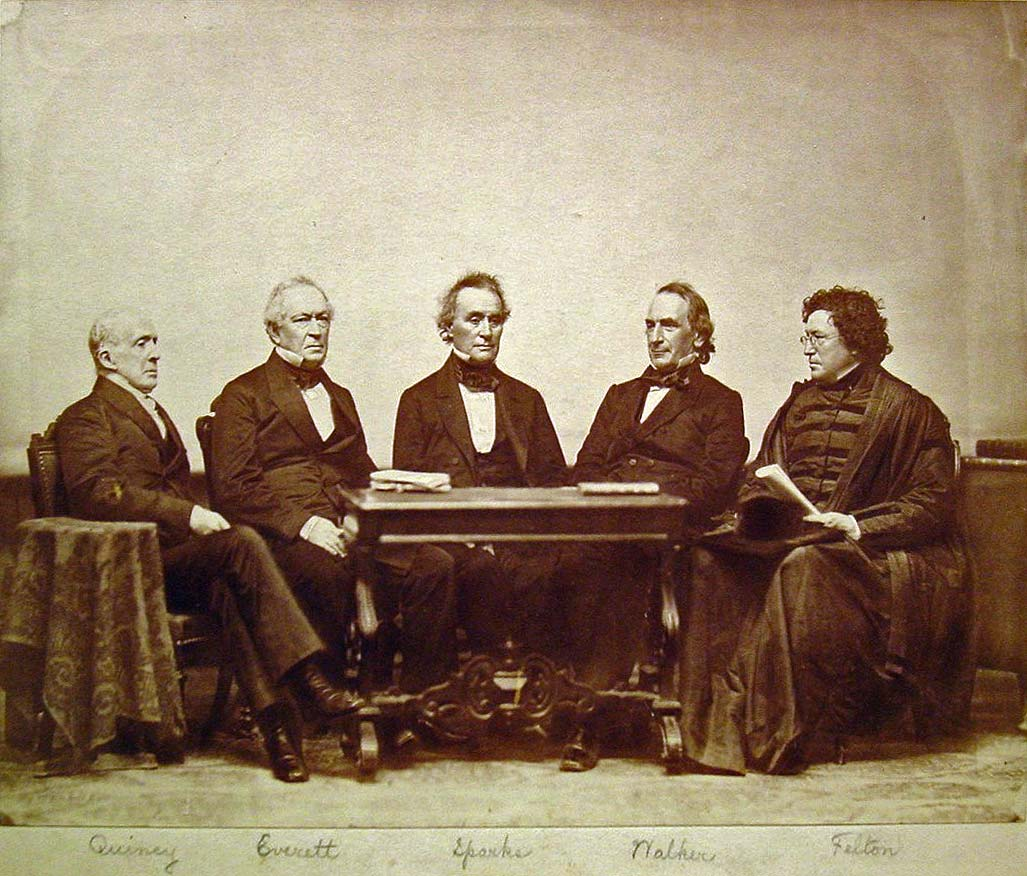
Five Harvard College/University presidents, sitting in order of when they served. Left-to-right: Josiah Quincy III, Edward Everett, Jared Sparks, James Walker and Cornelius Conway Felton.

Sparks was one of the American intellectuals who received French author and traveler Alexis de Tocqueville during his 1831–1832 visit to the United States. Their extensive conversations and subsequent correspondence informed de Tocqueville's best-known work, Democracy in America.

In 1837, Sparks was elected as a member to the American Philosophical Society.

In 1842 Sparks delivered 12 lectures on American history before the Lowell Institute in Boston. In 1838–1849 he was the first McLean Professor of Ancient and Modern History at Harvard, endowed by the will of wealthy merchant John McLean (1761-1823). His appointment to this position, says his biographer, was the first academic encouragement of American history, and of original historical research in the American field.

He was appointed in 1849 as president of Harvard College, and moved into a home on campus now called Treadwell-Sparks House. In 1853 Sparks retired on account of failing health, and devoted the rest of his life to his private studies. For several years he was a member of the Massachusetts Commonwealth Board of Education.

=== Death ===
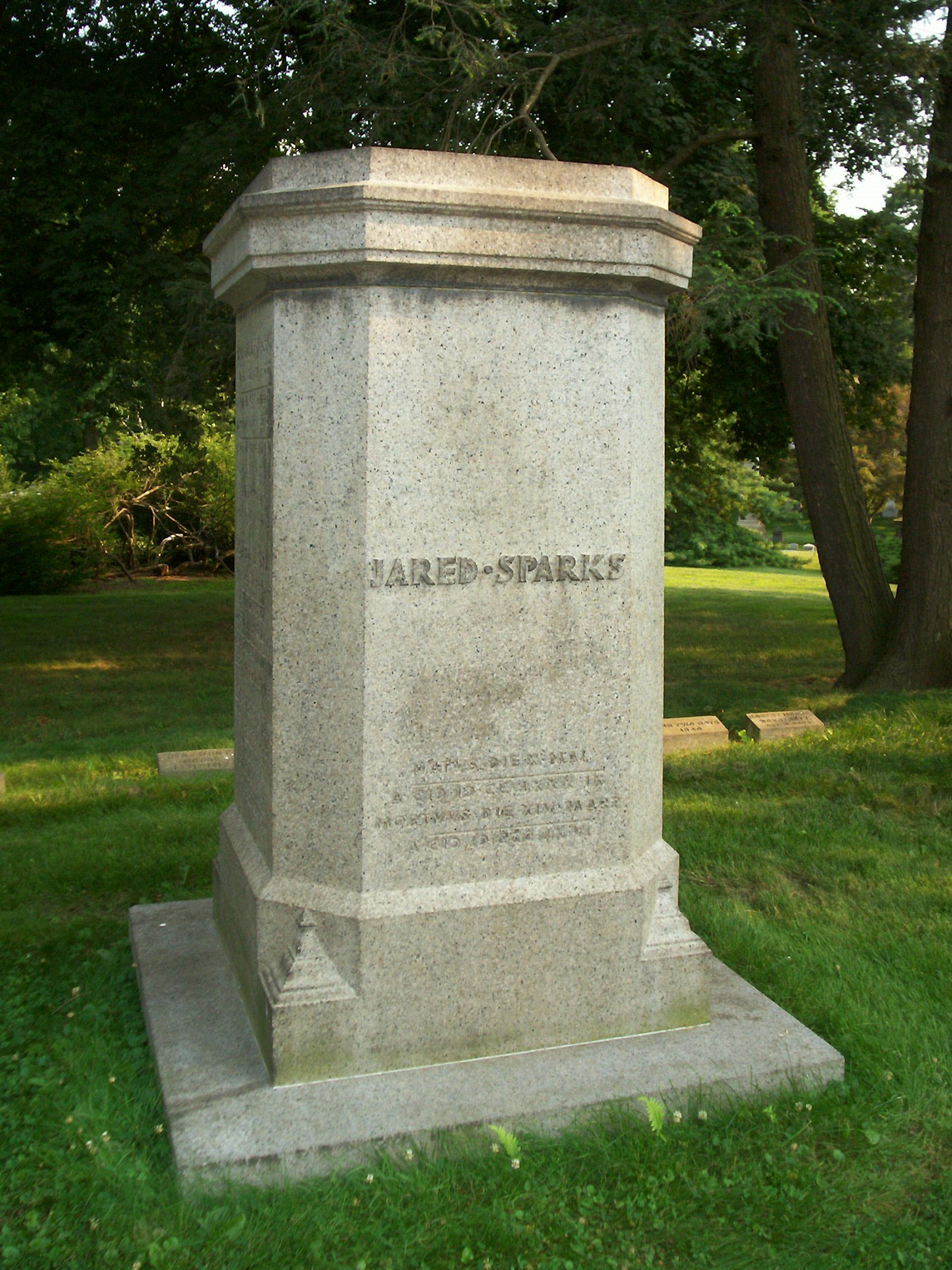
Grave of Jared Sparks at Mount Auburn Cemetery

Jared Sparks died on March 14, 1866, in Cambridge, Massachusetts and was buried in Mount Auburn Cemetery. His valuable collection of manuscripts and papers went to Harvard University. His private library and his maps were bought by Cornell University. He was a pioneer in large-scale collecting of documentary material on American history. He rendered valuable services to historical scholarship in the United States.

== Works ==
Other works by Sparks include:

- A sermon delivered at the ordination of the Rev. Jared Sparks, to the pastoral care of the First Independent Church in Baltimore. (1819)
- Memoirs of the Life and Travels of John Ledyard (1828);
- The Diplomatic Correspondence of the American Revolution (12 volumes, 1829–1830; redated 1854);
- Life of Gouverneur Morris, with Selections from his Correspondence and Miscellaneous Papers (3 volumes, 1832);
- Phi Beta Kappa Oration (1832) manuscript at Harvard University Manuscript
- A Collection of the Familiar Letters and Miscellaneous Papers of Benjamin Franklin (1833);
- The Works of Benjamin Franklin; with Notes and a Life of the Author (10 vols, 1836–1840; redated 1850), a work second in scope and importance to his Washington;
- Correspondence of the American Revolution; being Letters of Eminent Men to George Washington, from the Time of his taking Command of the Army to the End of his Presidency (4 volumes, 1853);

He also edited the Library of American Biography, in two series (10 and 15 volumes, respectively, 1834–1838, 1844–1847), - - to which he contributed articles on the lives of Gen. "Mad" Anthony Wayne, Henry Vane the Younger, Ethan Allen, spy, Gen. Benedict Arnold, explorer Jacques Marquette, explorer René Robert Cavelier, Sieur de La Salle, Kazimierz Pulaski ("Count Pulaski"), Jean Ribault, Gen. Charles Lee and John Ledyard, the last a reprint of his earlier work.

In addition, he aided Henry D. Gilpin in preparing an edition of the Papers of James Madison (1840), and brought out an American edition of William Smyth's Lectures on Modern History (2 volumes, 1841), which did much to stimulate historical study in the United States.

== Memorials ==
Historian Francis Parkman dedicated his The Conspiracy of Pontiac (1851) to Sparks.

Memorial plaques and historical displays with portraits of Channing, Sparks and others are shown in the historical exhibit area of the First Unitarian Church of Baltimore (Unitarian and Universalist). The congregation commemorates the annual anniversary of "The Baltimore Sermon" of May 5, 1819, on the first Sunday in May. Their "Union Sunday" features a sermon/homily/address by an invited speaker; it is attended by the ministers and members of the Unitarian churches in Maryland, along with other visiting ecumenical members of other local Christian churches, and interested lay people.

== See also ==
- Bibliography of George Washington (where many of Sparks' books are listed)

== Notes ==
Religious titles
Preceded by John Nicholson Campbell	Chaplain of the United States House of Representatives; December 3, 1821 – December 2, 1822	Succeeded by John Brackenridge, D.D.
Academic offices
Preceded by Edward Everett	President of Harvard University; 1849–1853	Succeeded by James Walker
