= William Dench =

English cricketer

William Dench (christened 16 April 1797) was an English cricketer who played for Sussex. He was born in Horsham.

Dench made a single appearance for the team, during the 1826 season. Batting as a tailender, he scored 0 not out and 2 runs in the two innings in which he batted, as Sussex finished with a first innings total of just 23 all out.
