= Karl Ploetz =

German writer (1819–1881)

Karl Julius Ploetz (8 July 1819 – 6 February 1881) was a German writer of scholarly works, most notably his Epitome of History published in the English language in 1883.

Ploetz was born in Berlin. He is credited with the idea of arranging historic data by dates, geographic location, and other factors. As later used in the English language, Encyclopedia of World History credited with being one of the most complete and comprehensive academic tools available before the electronic revolution. His work was a compilation of factual world events designed to help the students and the general reader. The first English translation was in the U.S. in 1883 by William H. Tillinghast and published by Houghton Mifflin Company. The name of the original work (in a form of a handbook) was Auszug aus der alten, mittleren und neueren Geschichte.

Karl Ploetz died in Görlitz in 1881.
