= Oliver Dench =

English actor (born 1993)

- Born: Oliver Mayer; 9 September 1993 (age 32); Reading, Berkshire, England
- Years active: 2013–present
- Family: Jeffery Dench (grandfather); Judi Dench (great aunt)

Oliver Mayer (born 9 September 1993), known professionally as Oliver Dench, is an English actor and director. He is a co-founding artistic director of the Revolve Theatre Company. On television, he is known for his roles in the CW series Pandora (2019–2020) and the BritBox period drama Hotel Portofino (2022–).

== Early life ==
Dench was born in Reading. His maternal grandfather was Jeffery Dench, actor and brother of Judi Dench. He attended Gillotts School and the Henley College. Dench has said he was "obsessed with Shakespeare as a child thanks to my granddad".

== Career ==
In 2014, Dench formed the Henley-on-Thames-based Revolve Theatre Company with Joe Morris and Tom Smith. Their debut show at the Henley Fringe Festival was Dench in a one-man version of Hamlet playing all fifteen roles.

Dench made his television debut in 2016 as Will Palmerston in the Canadian YTV series Ride about an equestrian school in England. He made his London stage debut in School Play at Southwark Playhouse in 2017. He appeared in the 2018 Sky Kids series The Athena.

In 2019, Dench began starring in the CW science fiction series Pandora as Xander Duvall, a role he would play for both seasons. He played Iullus in the first season of Domina before the role was taken over by Joseph Ollman. As of 2022, Dench stars as Lucian Ainsworth in the period drama Hotel Portofino. He starred as Cliff in the Paris revival of Cabaret that December at Le Lido on the Champs-Élysées.

== Filmography ==
=== Film ===
Year	Title	Role	Notes
2013	One Night at the Aristo	Bartender	Short film
2018	Technology	Orphan	
2018	Lifeline	Voice	Short film
TBA	Queen of the Redwood Mountains		

=== Television ===
Year	Title	Role	Notes
2016–2017	Ride	Will Palmerston	Main role
2018–2019	The Athena	Sam Warner	Main role
2019	Noughts + Crosses	Anthony	1 episode
2019–2020	Pandora	Xander Duvall	Main role
2021	Domina	Iullus	2 episodes
2021	Whitstable Pearl	Max Azarov	Episode: "The Free Waters"
2022–2024	Hotel Portofino	Lucian Ainsworth	Main role
2025	Sister Boniface Mysteries	Miles Fletcher	Episode: "The Happiest Family"
2026	Rivals	Hugo K Bruce	Series 2

== Stage ==
Year	Title	Role	Notes
2012	A Christmas Carol	Young Scrooge	Reading Repertory Theatre
2013	Romeo and Juliet	Paris	Reading Minster
2014	One Man Hamlet	Various	Henley Fringe Festival
2014	The Witch of Edmonton	Morris	Swan Theatre, Stratford-upon-Avon / Royal Shakespeare Company
2015	Much Ado About Nothing	Borachio	St James's Church, Reading
2015	Romeo and Juliet	Romeo	The Boater, Bath
2017	School Play	Tom	Southwark Playhouse, London
2022	Cabaret	Cliff	Le Lido, Paris
