= Angelina Ballerina: The Next Steps =

Animated television series

- Genre: Animated series Preschool; Musical
- Created by: Katharine Holabird; Helen Craig; Mallory Lewis
- Based on: Angelina Ballerina by Katharine Holabird; Helen Craig
- Directed by: Davis Doi
- Voices of: Charlotte Spencer (UK and US); Naomi McDonald (US); Jules de Jongh (US); Jo Wyatt (US); Emily Dormer (UK); Simon Mattacks (UK and US); Emma Tate (UK and US); Leah Zabari (UK and US); Beverley Klein (UK and US); Charlie Cameron (UK); Rachael Miller (UK); Lizzie Waterworth (UK); Louis Williams (UK); Larissa Murray (US)
- Theme music composer: Mark Williamson (music and lyrics); Judy Rothman (lyrics)
- Opening theme: "Angelina Ballerina" by Kacie Lynch (US); Claire Morgan (UK)
- Ending theme: "Angelina Ballerina" (instrumental)
- Composers: Score: Andy Street; Original songs: Mark Sayer-Wade (music); Mark Williamson (music and lyrics); Scott Erickson (music and lyrics); Judy Rothman (lyrics); Joseph K. Phillips (music and lyrics)
- Countries of origin: United Kingdom; United States
- Original language: English
- No. of series: 4
- No. of episodes: 40 (80 segments)

Production
- Executive producers: Jonathan Dern; Paul Sabella; Carolyn Monroe; Mallory Lewis; Bradley Hood
- Producer: Robert Winthrop
- Running time: 24 minutes (2-12 minute segments)
- Production companies: HIT Entertainment; Thirteen/WNET New York (Note: Animation outsourced to SD Entertainment)

Original release
- Network: Nick Jr. (United Kingdom); PBS Kids (United States)
- Release: 5 September 2009 – 13 November 2010

Related
- Angelina Ballerina

Angelina Ballerina: The Next Steps is an animated preschool children's television series co-produced by HIT Entertainment and Thirteen/WNET New York in association with Nickelodeon UK, with animation production by SD Entertainment. The series is based on the Angelina Ballerina series of children's books by author Katharine Holabird and illustrator Helen Craig; and functions as a revival and sequel to the 2001 series of the same name.

The series first aired in the United States on September 5, 2009 on PBS Kids, and would premiere on Nick Jr. a little while later, with Five later airing the show on its Milkshake! block. Two direct-to-video specials followed the series after its conclusion.

The series final episode date in the United States on PBS Kids on November 13, 2010, with reruns airing on PBS until November 14, 2015. It would still airing on PBS stations until January 31, 2016.

== Premise ==
The series celebrates music and songs and brings to life many forms of dance for Angelina including ballet, tap dancing, jazz, classical and ethnic. As a ballerina, Angelina's life revolves around dancing, singing and performance, family, friends, friendship and following her dreams. This series sees 10-year-old Angelina and her family move to the other side of Chipping Cheddar to attend a performing arts school called Camembert Academy. It features the debut of Ms. Mimi, Angelina's new teacher and new friends like Viki, Marco, Gracie, and A.J., as well as her best friend Alice who joins Camembert Academy.

== Characters ==
=== Main ===
- Angelina Mouseling (voiced by Charlotte Spencer) is the protagonist of the series. She is a feisty, caring, cheerful and happy-go-lucky mouseling who still dreams to become a prima ballerina. She is now 10 years old and a student at Camembert Academy. Her catchphrases are "Absolutely, positively!", "Really truly!", "Stupendous!", "Follow your dreams!", "Let's dance!", "Get up and dance!", "I'm Angelina Ballerina!", "Hoop-dee-doo!", and "Hooray!"
- Polly Mouseling (voiced by Leah Zabari) is Angelina's 4-year-old little sister. Polly is an eager Mouseling whenever Angelina takes the time to show her some of the basics of ballet. When there are steps she cannot copy them, Polly is very happy to make up her own, much to Angelina's dismay. Her catchphrase is "I love you, Angelina!"
- Mr. Maurice Mouseling (voiced by Simon Mattacks) is Angelina and Polly's father. He works as a reporter for the Mouseland Herald and keeps his finger on the pulse of the happenings in Chipping Cheddar. In the episode "Angelina and the Marcel Mouseau Mime Challenge", it is revealed that Mr. Mouseling was a drummer in a rock band.
- Mrs. Matilda Mouseling (voiced by Emma Tate) is Angelina and Polly's mother. Supportive yet firm, she provides the voice of reason the young starlet Angelina needs. In the episode "Angelina's Fancy Tutu", it is revealed that she was once a ballerina.
- Mrs. Thimble (voiced by Beverley Klein) is the owner of the sweets store next door to Mr. Mouseling's music store. She is a middle aged mouse with grey fur and wears a lilac dress with blue flowers and a bead collar, a white apron, dark purple shoes, and glasses.
- Ms. Mimi (voiced by Emma Tate in the UK and Larissa Murray in the US) is the head teacher at Camembert Academy and is everyone's role model. She is modern, young, fun, warm, loving and caring. She adores little mouselings as much as they adore her, and loves to inspire them with her own vivid imagination. Her catchphrase is "Bravo, students! Marvellous music and dancing!"
- Alice Nimbletoes (voiced by Rachael Miller in the UK and by Naomi McDonald in the US) is Angelina's best friend and an aspiring gymnast. She is optimistic, enthusiastic, feisty, cheerful, energetic, happy-go-lucky, and always up for a new adventure. Kind, innocent, and with a heart of gold, Alice is a bit forgetful, but she will try harder than everybody else. Her catchphrases are "Ooooh...it's the best fun ever!", "Knock, knock, who's there?", "Follow your dreams!", "Let's dance!", "Get up and dance!", "Hoop-dee-doo!", and "Hooray!"
- Gracie (voiced by Charlie Cameron in the UK and by Jo Wyatt in the US, who was also a voice actress in the original Angelina Ballerina series) is often Angelina's French rival and friend who is meticulous and a tad self-absorbed, and has shown to be a teacher's pet in order to get Ms. Mimi's attentions. Like Angelina, Gracie loves being the star of the show, but often uses those occasions to brag about herself. Nonetheless, Angelina knows Gracie is a very kind-hearted friend, and the competition keeps Angelina on her toes. Her catchphrase is "I can do it perfectly!"
- Viki (voiced by Emily Dormer in UK dub and Jules de Jongh in US dub) is an exciting friend for Angelina at Camembert Academy. She loves ethnic and unusual forms of dance, and she will be the first to try anything new. She is an Irish music lover and a great bass player. She likes standing out from the crowd and doing things her own way. Her catchphrase is "So amazing!"
- Marco (voiced by Louis Williams in the UK and Jules de Jongh in the US) is a Hispanic student from the exotic tropical country of Costa Mousa. Marco likes to play and hear music. Besides loving music, he is also wildly enthusiastic about sports, especially soccer. Marco has taught himself to play multiple instruments, and his favorite musical instrument is the conga drums. A helpful mouseling, Marco sometimes gets into jams due to Angelina's big ideas. He is also a great drummer. His catchphrase is "I just thought of a great rhythm!"
- A.J. (A.Z. in the US version) (voiced by Lizzie Waterworth in UK dub and Larissa Murray in US dub) is an American hip-hop student. He knows a lot about the latest culture phenomenon, such as the latest handshake, line dance, and cheese du jour. His catchphrase is "A.J. (or A.Z.) Mouse is in the house!"

== Episodes ==
=== Series overview ===
Series	Segments	Episodes	Originally released	
Series	Segments	Episodes	First released	Last released
1	20	10	5 September 2009	7 November 2009
2	20	10	14 November 2009	16 January 2010
3	20	10	23 January 2010	3 April 2010
4	20	10	4 September 2010	13 November 2010

=== Series 1 (2009) ===
No. overall	No. in series	Title	Original release date	Prod. code
1	1	Angelina's New Home	5 September 2009	101
1	1	Angelina's New School	5 September 2009	101
Angelina is not thrilled about her move to the other side of Chipping Cheddar, and even plans to quit her new school. It is Angelina's first day of school and it does not go as well as she planned it would.
2	2	Angelina's New Ballet Teacher	12 September 2009	102
2	2	Angelina's Dance Partner	12 September 2009	102
Angelina worries she will not learn much from her new ballet teacher Ms. Mimi since she teaches differently from her old teacher, Ms. Lilly. Song: Best Toe Forward Angelina's best friend, Alice gets sick and is unable to dance with Angelina on Dance-With-A-Partner-Day, so she decides to let Viki dance with her. Song: Forever Friends (Friendship is Forever)
3	3	Angelina's Gift for Ms. Mimi	19 September 2009	103
3	3	Angelina's Oldest Friend	19 September 2009	103
Angelina, Gracie, Marco and Viki want to give Ms. Mimi the best birthday ever, but things do not go to plan. Song: A Song for Ms. Mimi (We Love You) Angelina introduces Alice to her new Camembert Academy friends. Song: My Friend Alice
4	4	Angelina and the Hip Hop Kid	26 September 2009	104
4	4	Angelina and the Broken Fiddle	26 September 2009	104
Angelina meets A.J., a new student at Camembert Academy. Angelina and Polly accidentally break their father's fiddle. Song: Fiddle Around
5	5	Angelina and Alice's Big Night	3 October 2009	105
5	5	Angelina and the Giant	3 October 2009	105
Angelina wants her old friend Alice to attend a concert tour as her special guest, but Alice has an ice-skating event that night so they have to hurry between events. Then Angelina learns Alice will be starting at Cambembert. Song: I'm Your Friend Too Angelina and Alice create a prop for "Jackie and the Beanstalk", starring Gracie as the lead role. Song: Giant Song
6	6	Angelina's Musical Day	10 October 2009	106
6	6	Angelina's Crazy Solo	10 October 2009	106
Ms. Mimi develops laryngitis while directing rehearsals for a class production of "Peter & the Wolf", so she communicates with the students by using music. Angelina tries to have her way when she and her friends put on a show.
7	7	Angelina and the Irish Jig	17 October 2009	107
7	7	Angelina En Pointe	17 October 2009	107
Viki returns from Tippermousy with a disk of Irish music, which Angelina accidentally breaks while learning how to do an Irish jig. To make amends, she arranges an Irish-theme party for her classmate, but it leads to a misunderstanding as Viki thinks Angelina is spreading rumours about her. Angelina tries to audition for the Mouskinov Ballet, and tries to dance en pointe like the older students. Song: I Will Be a Star
8	8	Angelina's Rock Band	24 October 2009	108
8	8	Angelina's Lost Ice Skates	24 October 2009	108
Angelina joins a band, but her enthusiasm fades because she believes her part is unimportant. Song: Rock Band Song (Every Part Counts in Rock ‘n’ Roll) Angelina loses her ice skates when she is supposed to take part in a big show with Alice, and they have to retrace their steps to find them.
9	9	Angelina and the New Music Store	31 October 2009	109
9	9	Angelina and Ms. Mimi	31 October 2009	109
Angelina celebrates the grand opening of her dad's new music shop, but Ms. Thimble complains about the noise. Ms. Mimi admonishes Angelina for being loud in class, leading Angelina to be overly apologetic to Ms. Mimi. Song: I Should Have Listened to My Friends
10	10	Angelina and Super Polly	7 November 2009	110
10	10	Angelina's Dance Like a Cake Day	7 November 2009	110
After reading a book about a mouseling with superhero powers, Polly thinks she might have special abilities too. Viki puts together Dance-Like-a-Cake Day, in which dancers must bring a cake associated with a dance, but Angelina's plans may fall flat after her gingerbread house collapses. Song: Super Polly (Everyone is Good at Something)

=== Series 2 (2009–10) ===
No. overall	No. in series	Title	Original release date	Prod. code
11	1	Angelina's Sleepover	14 November 2009	201
11	1	Angelina's Noisy, Messy Lunchtime	14 November 2009	201
Angelina, Viki, and Gracie have a sleepover the night before the Silly Hat Carnival, but stay up too late and then oversleep, causing them to miss an important ballet rehearsal. Song: Angelina's Slumber Party (Dancing in the Moonlight) Ms. Mimi cancels lunchtime rehearsals when Angelina and her friends are too loud, noisy, and messy, leading Angelina to host the rehearsals in her attic dance studio. Song: Dancing Butterfly
12	2	Angelina's Holiday Treats	21 November 2009	202
12	2	Angelina and the Front Row Ticket	21 November 2009	202
Angelina and Marco overindulge in candy canes and gingerbread cookies prior to a performance of Dance of the Sugar Plum Fairy. Song: Holiday Treats (Holiday Time) Angelina is excited about seeing The Nutcracker and invites two of her friends to go with her but then realizes she only has one extra ticket, so now she has to decide between Alice and Viki. Song: Front Row Seats (Home of Ballet)
13	3	Angelina Keeps the Peace	28 November 2009	203
13	3	Angelina and Alice Mousikova	28 November 2009	203
Angelina, Viki, Gracie and A.J. work together to develop a dance for class, but Gracie and AZ disagree over what the dance should be, so Angelina must find a way get everyone to agree with each other. Alice adopts the persona of her idol, Russian gymnast Anna Mousikova, after Miss Mimi assigns reports on the mouselings' heroes. Alice becomes so obsessed with her idol, she distances herself from her friends. Songs: The Best For You
14	4	Angelina and Gracie's Creative Day	5 December 2009	204
14	4	Angelina's Big Part	5 December 2009	204
Gracie contemplates copying an established dance for Make-It-All-Up-Day when she can not come up with one on her own, but Angelina persuades her to improvise a new routine. Angelina has second thoughts about playing the main part in a school play Once Upon a Pillow when she learns her character is asleep for most of the performance. Songs: It Takes a Lot of Dancers
15	5	Angelina and the Tummy Butterflies	12 December 2009	205
15	5	Angelina and the Magician	12 December 2009	205
The mouselings learn about jazz dance, improvisation, and poetry, but when they have to present poems to the entire class Alice develops a serious case of "tummy butterflies" and Angelina must help Alice with memorizing her poem. Gracie, who has been tap dancing for years, forgets practicing in favor of learning magic. Song: A Step at a Time
16	6	Angelina Cheerleader	19 December 2009	206
16	6	Angelina's Ballet School	19 December 2009	206
Angelina tries to support Marco in the Mouse Marathon, which includes forming a cheerleading team to cheer him on, but all the attention unnerves him. Angelina opens her own ballet school in the attic to teach Polly ballet, but her overbearing manner soon causes her sister to quit. Songs: One, Two, Three, Four, Five
17	7	Angelina and the Roquefort's Rhythmic Ghost	26 December 2009	207
17	7	Angelina's Lunch Table	26 December 2009	207
Gracie, Angelina, Viki, and A.J. think they heard a mysterious tapping noise in Roquefort Hall is from a ghost. Angelina's friendship with Gracie is strained due to the many friends that Angelina has and the limited time she has to spend with each of them. Songs: And That Makes You My Friend
18	8	Angelina and the Big News	2 January 2010	208
18	8	Angelina's Secret Valentine	2 January 2010	208
When Angelina, Viki, and Marco mistakenly think Ms. Mimi is getting married after overhearing her talking on the phone, they learn about the Bridal March and organ music in order to make her wedding day special. Angelina receives a Valentine card from a secret admirer. Songs: Let's Make Valentines
19	9	Angelina and the Front Page	9 January 2010	209
19	9	Angelina's Cheese Roll	9 January 2010	209
Angelina helps her dad take pictures of Camembert Academy and its students for a Mouseland Herald story, but the assignment turns difficult because Gracie wants to be in every shot. Song: Cheese Angelina helps A.J. learn the complicated Cheese Roll dance. Song: A Step at a Time
20	10	Angelina and the Musical Plant	16 January 2010	210
20	10	Angelina's Hip Hop Boys Show	16 January 2010	210
When the mouselings disagree on the music for a show, Angelina forges a compromise by applying a lesson from a science project. Song: It's Spring Angelina is set to direct a hip-hop dance show, but it may not go on when A.J. hurts his foot.

=== Series 3 (2010) ===
No. overall	No. in season	Title	Original release date	Prod. code
21	1	Angelina and the Cheddar Cheese Slide	23 January 2010	301
21	1	Angelina and the Case of the Missing Music	23 January 2010	301
Angelina, Marco and A.J. need one more person for their "Cheddar Cheese Slide" dance. Gracie joins in, but because she only knows the French version, things do not go so smoothly. Viki turns detective when Marco's sheet music disappears. Song: Solve the Mystery
22	2	Angelina, the Pet Sitter	30 January 2010	302
22	2	Angelina and the Music Box	30 January 2010	302
Angelina pet-sits Ms. Mimi's canary, Mr. Chirpyface for the weekend, but the bird escapes from its cage and she has to look for him. Angelina accidentally breaks a music box that Polly received from her grandmother. Song: I'll Miss Out On the Fun of Doing My Part
23	3	Angelina and the Dance-A-Thon	6 February 2010	303
23	3	Angelina and the Art Show	6 February 2010	303
Gracie accidentally recycles the pledge sheet when Angelina and her friends hold a Chipping Cheddar Earth Club dance marathon. Song: The Mouseling Twirl Viki tries to paint Angelina and Gracie for the Camembert art show, but they can not hold still long enough for her to finish the picture. Song: Using Our Imaginations (We Can Be Anything)
24	4	Angelina's Hiccups	20 February 2010	304
24	4	Angelina and the Must-Have Ballet Bag	20 February 2010	304
Angelina gets the hiccups and her friends help her get rid of them. Angelina wants an Eva the Diva bag but is convinced otherwise by Viki. Song: I Just Want to Be Me
25	5	Angelina's Room	27 February 2010	305
25	5	Angelina's Camembert Parade	27 February 2010	305
Angelina and Gracie learn that being roommates is not always easy when Gracie stays with Angelina for a few days. Song: There is Not Enough Space Angelina organizes a parade. Song: Teamwork
26	6	Angelina and the Band Leader	6 March 2010	306
26	6	Angelina and Polly's Two-Hour Show	6 March 2010	306
A.J. breaks one of his drumsticks, making rehearsal for Angelina's musical ensemble impossible, until he discovers another way to keep the beat. Angelina and Polly put on a show for their parents, but Mr. and Mrs. Mouseling are so tired they can barely keep their eyes open. Song: Win the Prize
27	7	Angelina and the Marcel Mouseau Mime Challenge	13 March 2010	307
27	7	Angelina and the Disco Dance Craze	13 March 2010	307
Marco has a chance to win tickets to see his favorite mime artist. Song: As The Music Plays Gracie keeps disco dancing all the time. Song: Disco Crazy
28	8	Angelina and the Mouselinghood of the Dancing Shoes	20 March 2010	308
28	8	Angelina and Her Parents' Dance Lesson	20 March 2010	308
The boys want to join the newly formed girls' club. Song: We're Best Friends Angelina's parents take swing dance lessons. Song: Swing Thing
29	9	Angelina and the New Jeans	27 March 2010	309
29	9	Angelina and the Poster	27 March 2010	309
Angelina and Alice create a new way to dance for A.J. when he is unable to dance in his new jeans. Angelina and Marco design a poster. Song: Camembert Is Where I Love to Be
30	10	Angelina's Nature Dance	3 April 2010	310
30	10	Angelina's Spring Fling	3 April 2010	310
Angelina and her classmates create a nature-inspired dance routine. Song: I Love My Sister So On a cold day, Angelina and her friends learn about spring traditions from around the world to try and make spring come faster. Song: Our Favorite Time of Year Is Spring

=== Series 4 (2010) ===
No. overall	No. in season	Title	Original release date	Prod. code
31	1	Angelina's Fancy Tutu	4 September 2010	401
31	1	Angelina and the Musical Theater	4 September 2010	401
Angelina finds a fancy tutu, and she and Polly search for the owner. When the "Mousical the Musical" performance is cancelled at Camembert, Viki and her friends decided to perform their own show. Special guest: Perry Parmesan Song: Welcome, It's Showtime!
32	2	Angelina and the Heart on Ice	11 September 2010	402
32	2	Angelina's Kitchen Band	11 September 2010	402
Angelina and Alice need to think of a love-themed routine for Chipping Cheddar's Hockey Game and they ask Marco to help them. Song: You and Me Ms. Mimi shows the mouselings that music is everywhere by taking them on a field trip.
33	3	Angelina and the Carnival	18 September 2010	403
33	3	Angelina Jumps the River	18 September 2010	403
When Marco feels nostalgic for the Costa Mousa Carnival, Viki plans one for him, but it is Polly's birthday the same day it is set. Angelina has a hard time completing her assignment until Polly gives her an idea.
34	4	"Angelina and the Windy Children's Day"	25 September 2010	404
34	4	"Angelina and Ms. Mimi's Dance"	25 September 2010	404
The Mouselings' Annual Children's Day does not go to plan. Song: Children's Day Ms. Mimi performs a special modern dance, and explains to the mouselings that it took a lot of support and practice. Song: Making It Look Easy (Is As Not As Easy As It Looks)
35	5	Angelina and the Mini-Mouseling	2 October 2010	405
35	5	Angelina's Helpful Friend	2 October 2010	405
Polly wants to become taller, so Angelina and her friends show her that she should be happy about her size. Viki tries to help everybody at once.
36	6	Angelina's Mother Day	9 October 2010	406
36	6	Angelina's Father Day Surprise	9 October 2010	406
Angelina is inspired by musical dynamics that Ms. Mimi had taught in class to make her chores fun as a Mother's Day Gift. Song: Helping Hands (Wouldn't It Be Nice?) While decorating the store for Father's Day, Angelina and Polly learn about klezmer music.
37	7	Angelina and Polly's Big Day	16 October 2010	407
37	7	Angelina and the Smelly Cheese	16 October 2010	407
When Alice is babysitting Polly, Angelina becomes worried Polly prefers Alice over her. The mouselings are worried that Mrs. Thimble's special Fête Française cheese, which has an overwhelming smell, will scare everyone away. Song: Frère Jacques
38	8	Angelina's Indian Lunchtime	23 October 2010	408
38	8	Angelina, A.J. and Cheezy Z	23 October 2010	408
Marco wants to perform the Indian epic Ramayana for a school performance, but his friends would rather do "Mouselina". After learning the story of his selection, however, the mouselings change their minds and surprise him by learning the song and choreography. Song: Ramayana A.J. drops big hints as to what he wants for his birthday, but his friends have another gift in mind.
39	9	Angelina's Trick or Treat Feat	30 October 2010	409
39	9	Angelina and the Laughing Poet	30 October 2010	409
When the mouselings' costumes do not arrive in time for Halloween, Angelina and her friends decide to make their own. Song: Express Ourselves The mouselings have to portray emotions through poetry, but Alice can not keep a straight face.
40	10	Angelina and the Dragon Dance	13 November 2010	410
40	10	Angelina's Opera	13 November 2010	410
Viki wants to do the dragon dance with her friends as an assignment. Song: Chinese Dragon Dance Angelina's class must present the history of Chipping Cheddar's Cheese Day to town. Songs: So Much History / The Cheese of Chipping Cheddar

== Films (2011–12) ==
No. overall	No. in season	Title	Original release date	Prod. code
41	1	"Angelina Ballerina: The Shining Star Trophy"	3 September 2011	501
Angelina helps her friends prepare for a special talent show with an amazing prize and forgets to practice her own routine until it is almost too late. Song: Follow My Lead
42	2	"Angelina Ballerina: Dreams Do Come True"	8 September 2012	502
Angelina wins the Mouseland Herald's "Big Dreams Do Come True" competition and a place at the Metroquefort Ballet Junior Dance Company. She has to make a decision whether or not she wants to continue her dreams or continue on with her life at Camembert Academy with the love and nurturing care from her friends and family. Songs: My Big Sister/If I Listen To My Heart/ Dreams Do Come True
