= Gaetano Meo =

Italian-British artist's model and painter

- Born: 1849; Basilicata, Italy
- Died: 16 January 1925 (aged 75–76); London, United Kingdom

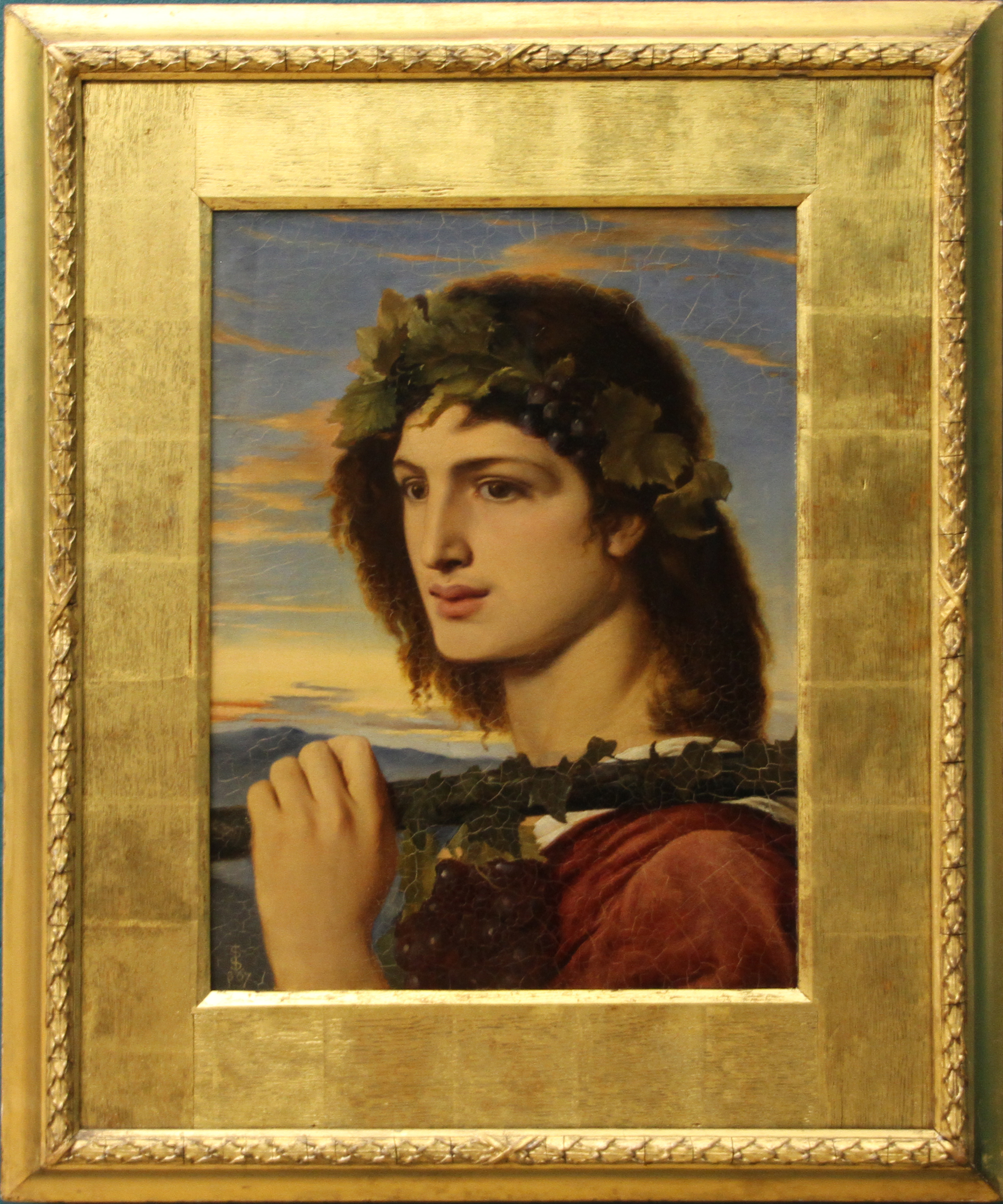
Simeon Solomon, Bacchus, oil on paper, 1867, Birmingham Museum and Art Gallery, Birmingham, UK

Gaetano Giuseppe Faostino Meo (1849 – 16 January 1925) was an Italian-British artist's model, landscape painter, and a noted craftsman in mosaic and stained glass. His unpublished autobiography is a useful source for art historians of the Aesthetic Movement and Edwardian Era.

== Model ==
He was a son of Rocco Meo, an Italian shepherd of Greek descent whose surname was probably a diminutive version of Bartolomeo, and Maria Francesca (née Pignone) Meo. He had at least three elder brothers and a younger sister, and grew up in the town of Laurenzana, in Basilicata, southern Italy. In 1864, Meo (age 15) and an older brother walked from Naples to Paris. Playing harp and lute, they supported themselves as street musicians while saving money for passage to the United States. By 1866, Meo was posing as an artist's model in Paris. The pair lacked passports, and were smuggled into the United Kingdom aboard a freighter from Boulogne. Meo remained in London, but his brother continued on to America.

Alone in London, Meo sought to play his harp in Italian restaurants, a safer place than busking in the streets, where he was more likely to be arrested by police, and deported. Pre-Raphaelite painter Simeon Solomon claimed to have discovered the 18-year-old playing harp in the streets. "Meo represented a form of classical southern beauty much sought after in paintings of scenes from Greek mythology." In 1867, in Rome, Solomon painted a three-quarter-length watercolor of another model dressed as Bacchus. That same year, in London, he painted a head-and-bust oil portrait of Meo as Bacchus.

Meo posed for other British painters such as Ford Madox Brown, Edward Burne-Jones, Luke Fildes, Henry Holiday, Henry Holland (1839–1927), Frederic Leighton, Edwin Long, George Heming Mason, William Blake Richmond, Dante Gabriel Rossetti, and sculptor Hamo Thornycroft. By 1870, he was also working as Rossetti's studio assistant.

Male models in England generally insisted on wearing loincloths, but Meo would pose fully nude. In his autobiography, Meo contrasted how models were treated in France versus England:

In Paris the artists treated their models as friends, they were regarded as fellow workers in a great undertaking, coadjutors to whose dramatic and artistic co-operation the artists were greatly indebted. After work, the artist and his model dined together and talked, and the model, if intelligent, learnt much of Art. … But English artists were different, as a rule they treated their models as dirt! Not so Richmond and Rossetti, and Burne Jones – God bless him! – they treated their models as human beings.

=== Edward Burne-Jones ===
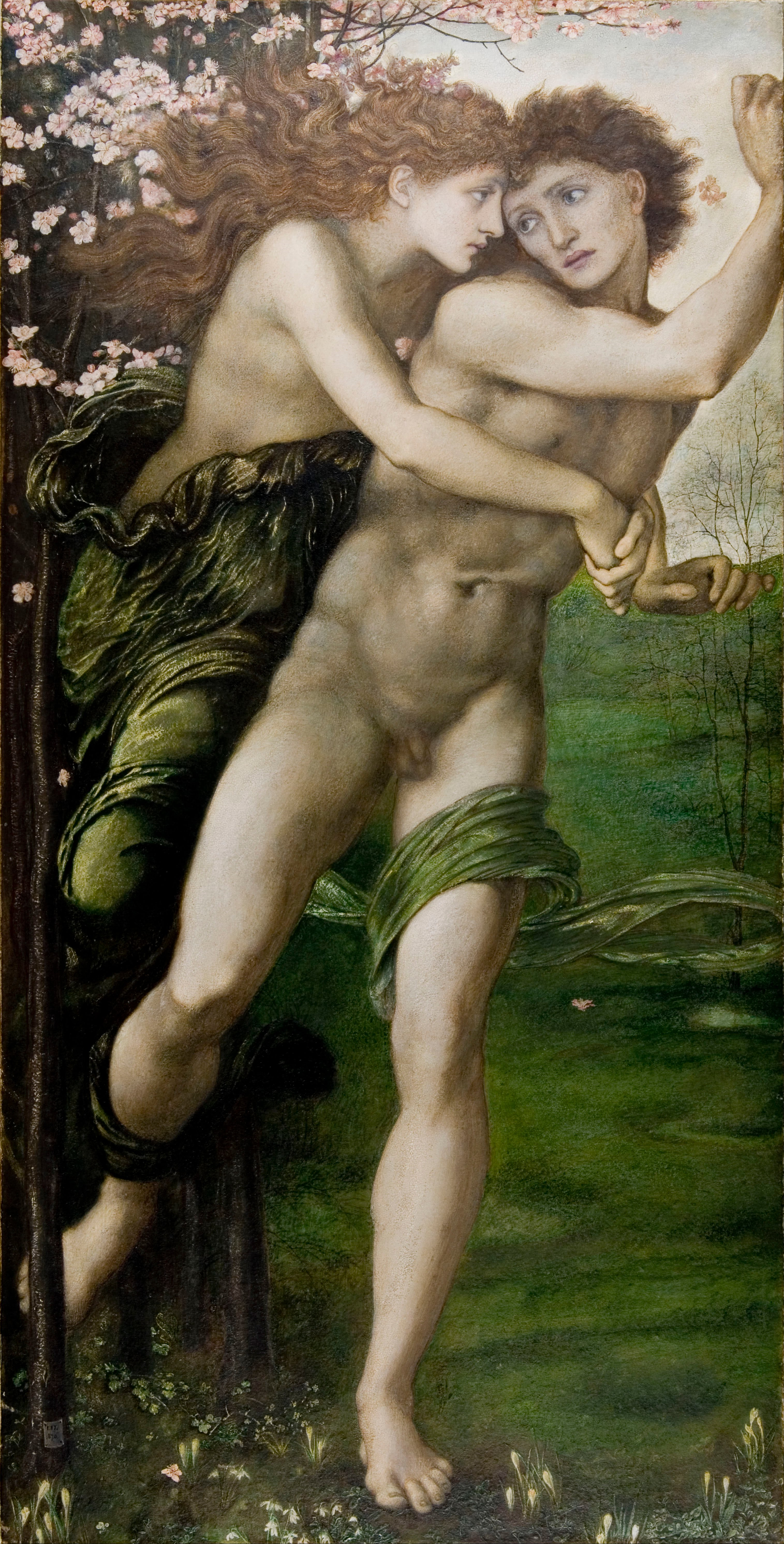
Edward Burne-Jones, Phyllis and Demophoön, watercolour, 1870, Birmingham Museum and Art Gallery, Birmingham, UK

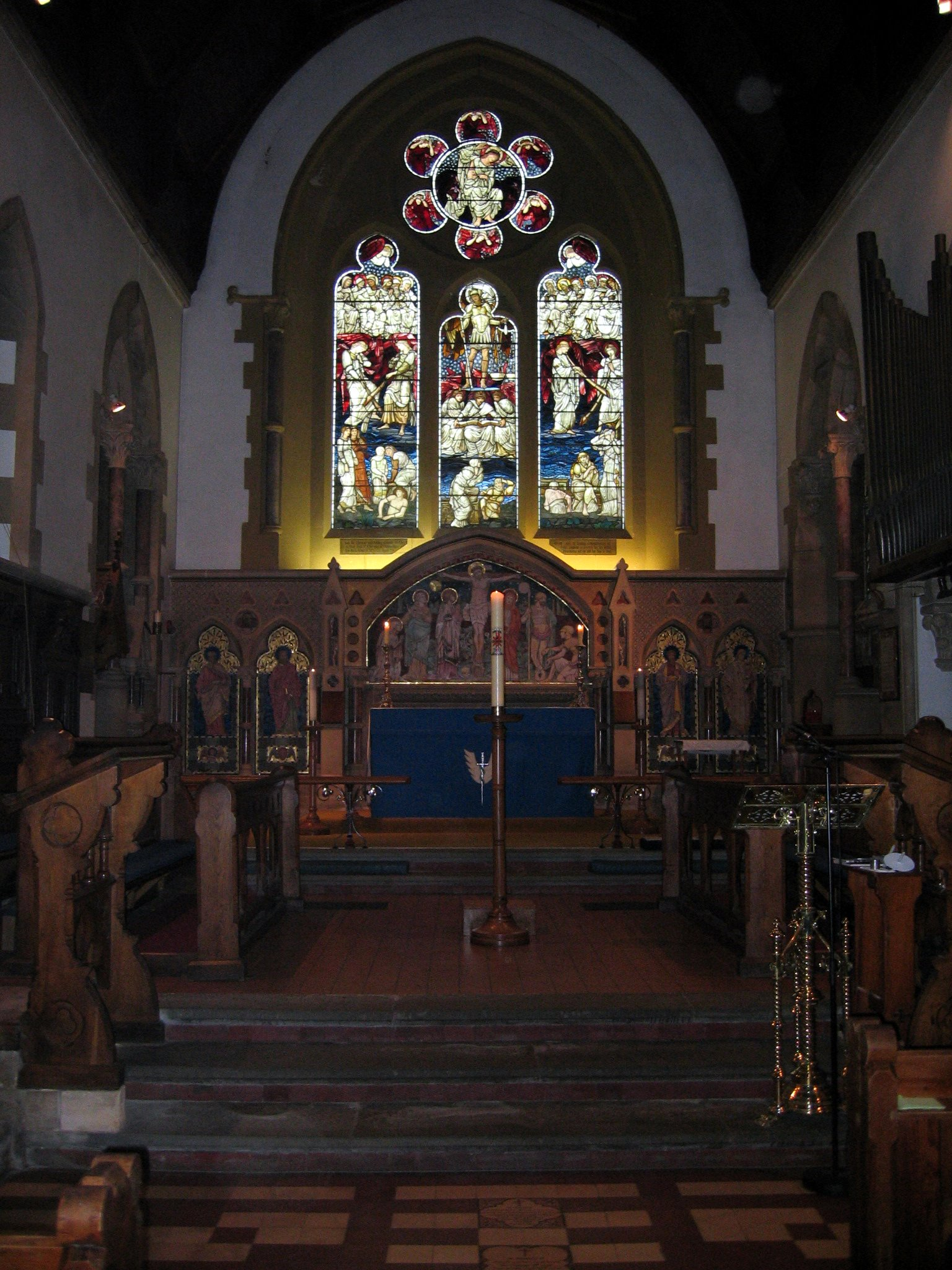
Edward Burne-Jones, Dies Domine Window (1876), St. Michael & St. Mary Magdelene Church, Easthampstead, UK. (circular window at top)

Edward Burne-Jones used his mistress, Maria Zambaco, and Meo as the models for Phyllis and Demophoön (1870). (Note: "Phyllis has the unmistakable features of Maria Zambaco, with whom Burne-Jones had been infatuated since 1868. Her depiction in such a scene as this, with its poignant Latin tag—"Tell me what I have done, except to love unwisely?"—has provoked much discussion on the psychological implications of the picture, which at the very least must have served as an act of catharsis in exorcizing the artist's feelings of guilt toward his wife as well as toward his mistress.") In the legend from Ovid's Heroides, Phyllis was the daughter of the King of Thrace, and Demophoön the son of King Theseus of Athens. On the day after their wedding, Demophoön departed for his father's land, promising to return for his bride. Phyllis would go to the shore each day to watch for his ship, but it never came. Finally, in despair, she hanged herself and the gods transformed her into an almond tree. When Demophoön finally did return, he remorsefully embraced the almond tree and it burst into bloom. The gods took pity on Phyllis, and transformed her back into a woman. Burne-Jones's innovation was to portray the moment of transformation, in which the branches entangling Demophoön suddenly become the arms of Phyllis embracing him. "When the painting was exhibited at the Old Watercolour Society for the 1870 Summer Exhibition, great controversy followed, partially because of Burne-Jones' affair, but also as a result of Demophoön's nudity. Due to the numerous complaints, Burne-Jones withdrew the painting from the exhibition two weeks after the opening." Burne-Jones later painted another version in oil, The Tree of Forgiveness (1881–1882), with Phyllis emerging fully nude from the trunk of the tree, and Demophoön's genitals covered by drapery.

=== William Blake Richmond ===
The extremely close, nearly 50-year friendship between Meo and William Blake Richmond began with a mysterious incident. In 1872, Meo arrived unannounced at Richmond's country house seeking modeling work. He encountered a beautiful woman inside the back door, who pointed the way to the painter's studio. Meo came to believe that the woman had been the ghost of Richmond's first wife, Charlotte, and took it as an omen that the two men were intended to work together. Meo became Richmond's principal model, studio assistant and student. He likely posed for the three muscular angels guarding the funeral bier of a shrouded female corpse in The Watchers (Note: Simon Reynolds: "I am convinced that The Watchers depicts the corpse of Charlotte, dead some ten years, with a very Italian background surrounding her; the naked angels are more than likely depictions of Gaetano Meo, welcomed as he was into the intimacy of Richmond's life.")—thought to be Richmond's elegy to Charlotte. Meo later assisted Richmond on murals, acted as his business manager in negotiations with clients, and for more than ten years led the team that executed Richmond's mosaics at St. Paul's Cathedral.

=== Works for which Meo posed ===
- Simeon Solomon, Bacchus (oil on paper, 1867), Birmingham Museum and Art Gallery, Birmingham, UK
- Simeon Solomon, The Sleepers and One that Watcheth (watercolour, 1867), Leamington Spa Art Gallery, Warwickshire, UK
- Simeon Solomon, A Prelude by Bach (watercolour, 1868), private collection
- Dante Gabriel Rossetti, Dante's Dream at the Time of Beatrice's Death (watercolour, 1869–1871), Walker Art Gallery, Liverpool, UK
  - Rossetti painted an 1880 version in oil, now at the McManus Gallery, Dundee, UK.
- Simeon Solomon, A Youth Relating Tales to Ladies, (1870), Tate Britain, London
- Edward Burne-Jones, Phyllis and Demophoön (watercolour, 1870), Birmingham Museum and Art Gallery, Birmingham, UK
  - Burne-Jones painted a variation of this in oil, The Tree of Forgiveness (1881–1882), now at the Lady Lever Art Gallery, Liverpool, UK.
- Frederic Leighton, The Arts of Industry as Applied to War (mural, 1870–1872), Victoria and Albert Museum, London
- Edward Burne-Jones, Love Among the Ruins (watercolour, 1870–1873), private collection
  - After the watercolour was damaged, Burne-Jones painted a larger version in oil (1893–1894), now at Wightwick Manor, West Midlands, UK.
- Edward Burne-Jones, The Feast of Peleus (1872, reworked 1881), Birmingham Museum and Art Gallery, Birmingham, UK
- George Heming Mason, The Harvest Moon (1872), Tate Britain, London
- Luke Fildes, Fair Quiet and Sweet Rest (1872), Warrington Museum & Art Gallery, Warrington, UK
- Edward Burne-Jones, Dies Domine (watercolour, 1873–1874), unlocated. Burne-Jones portrayed Meo as Christ seated at the Last Judgment.
  - Dies Domine was copied as a stained-glass window (1876) for the Church of St. Michael and St. Mary Magdelene, Easthampstead, Berkshire, UK
  - A photogravure of Dies Domine was published in 1900.
- William Blake Richmond, The Watchers (1873–1876), private collection
- Frederic Leighton, Eastern Slinger (1875)
- Edward Burne-Jones, Le Chante d'Amour (The Love Song) (1877), Metropolitan Museum of Art, New York City
- Frank Bernard Dicksee, Harmony (1879), Towneley Hall Art Gallery and Museum, Towneley Park, Burnley
- William Blake Richmond, The Song of Miriam (1880), Chi Mei Museum, Taiwan
- Lawrence Alma-Tadema, An Audience at Agrippa's (1881), Dick Institute, Kilmarnock, UK
- Henry Holiday, Dante and Beatrice (1883), Walker Art Gallery, Liverpool, UK. Holiday used another model for Dante's hands.
- Hamo Thornycroft, The Mower (bronze, 1888–1890), Tate Britain, London
- William Blake Richmond, Venus and Anchises (1890), Walker Art Gallery, Liverpool, UK
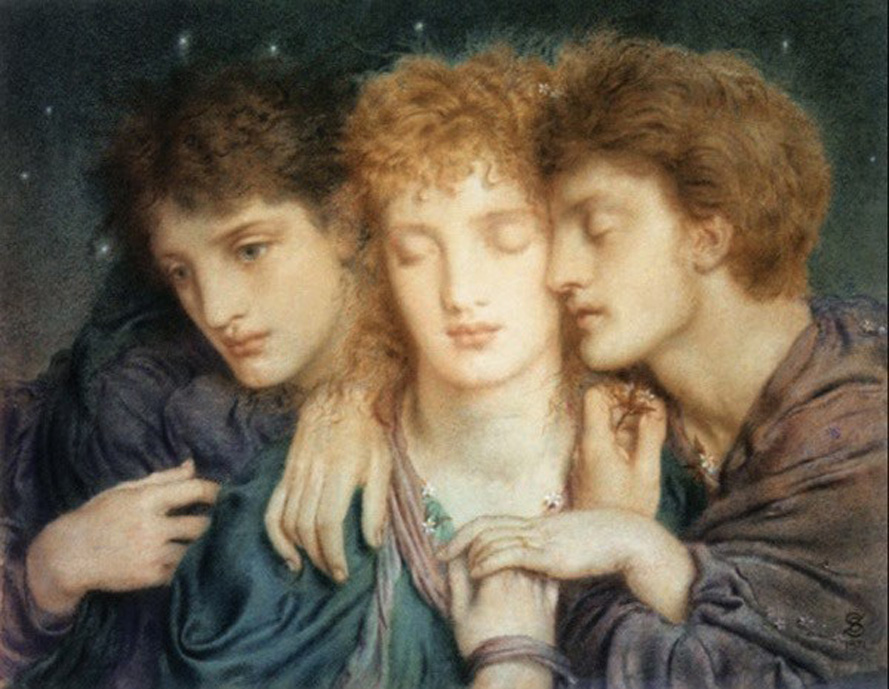
Simeon Solomon, The Sleepers and One that Watcheth, 1867, Leamington Spa Art Gallery, Warwickshire, UK. (Meo is the man on the right)

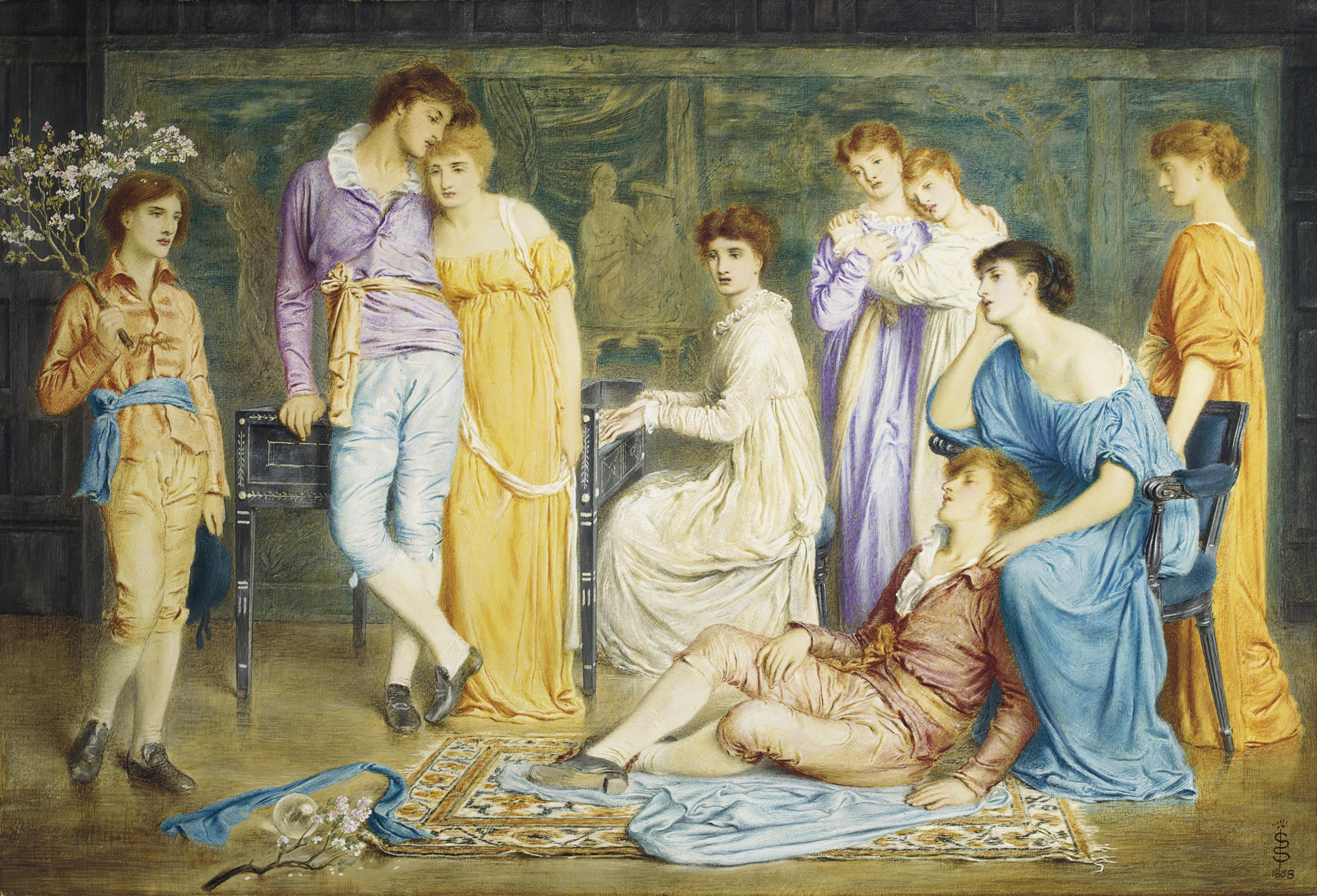
Simeon Solomon, A Prelude by Bach, 1868, private collection

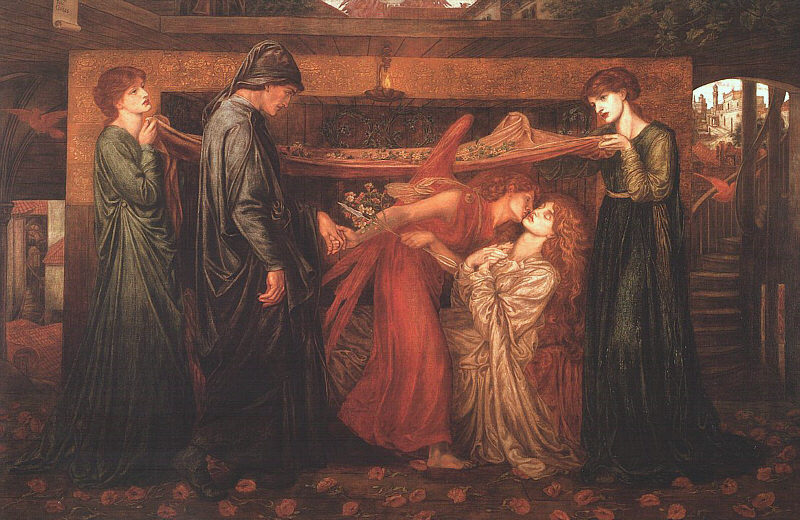
Dante Gabriel Rossetti, Dante's Dream on the Day of the Death of Beatrice, watercolour, 1869–1871, Walker Art Gallery, Liverpool, UK

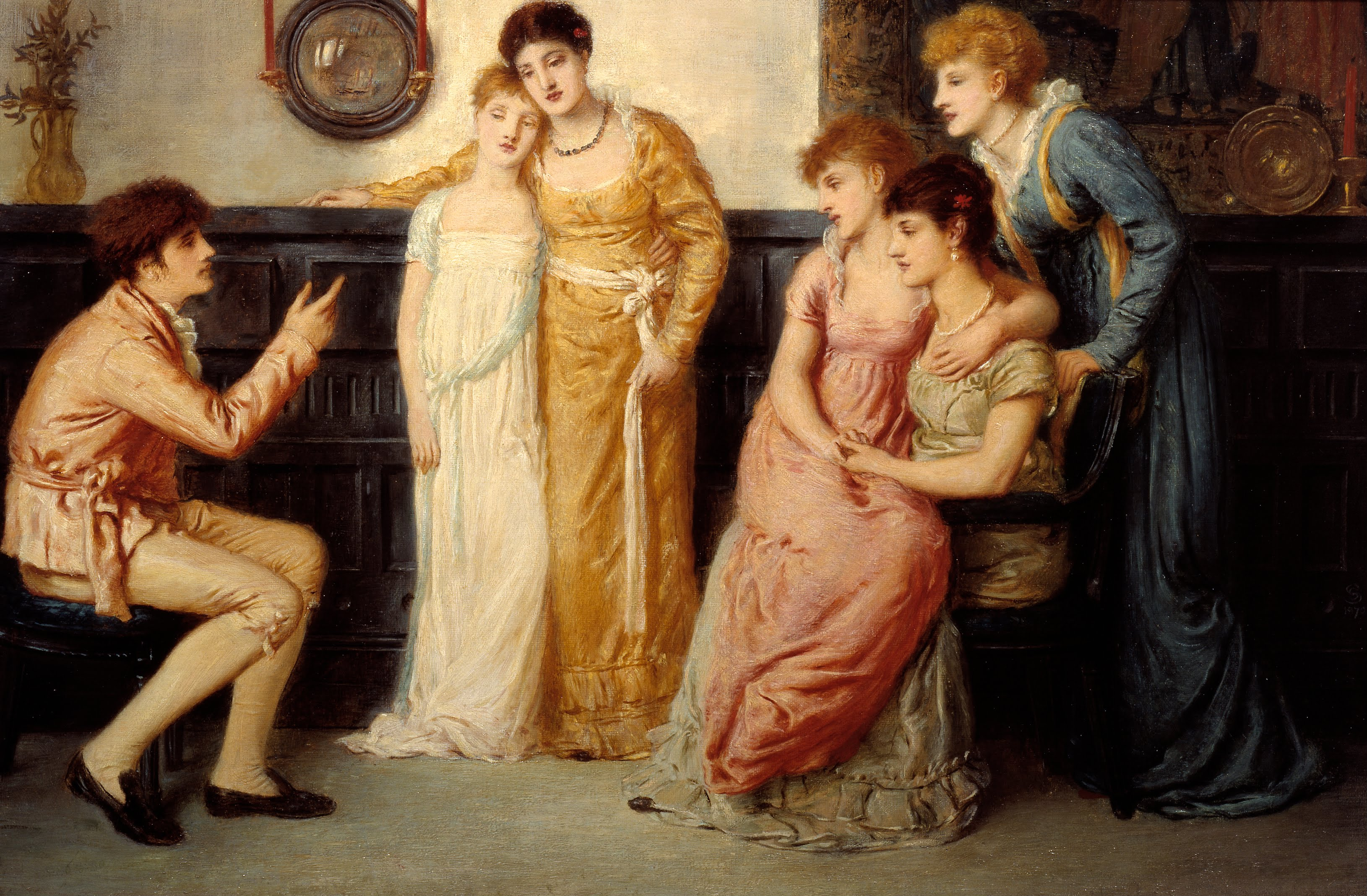
Simeon Solomon, A Youth Relating Tales to Ladies, (1870), Tate Britain, London

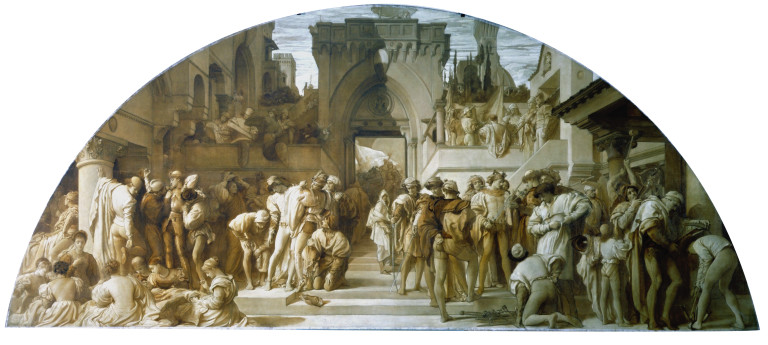
Frederic Leighton, The Arts of Industry as Applied to War, mural, 1870–1872, Victoria & Albert Museum, London

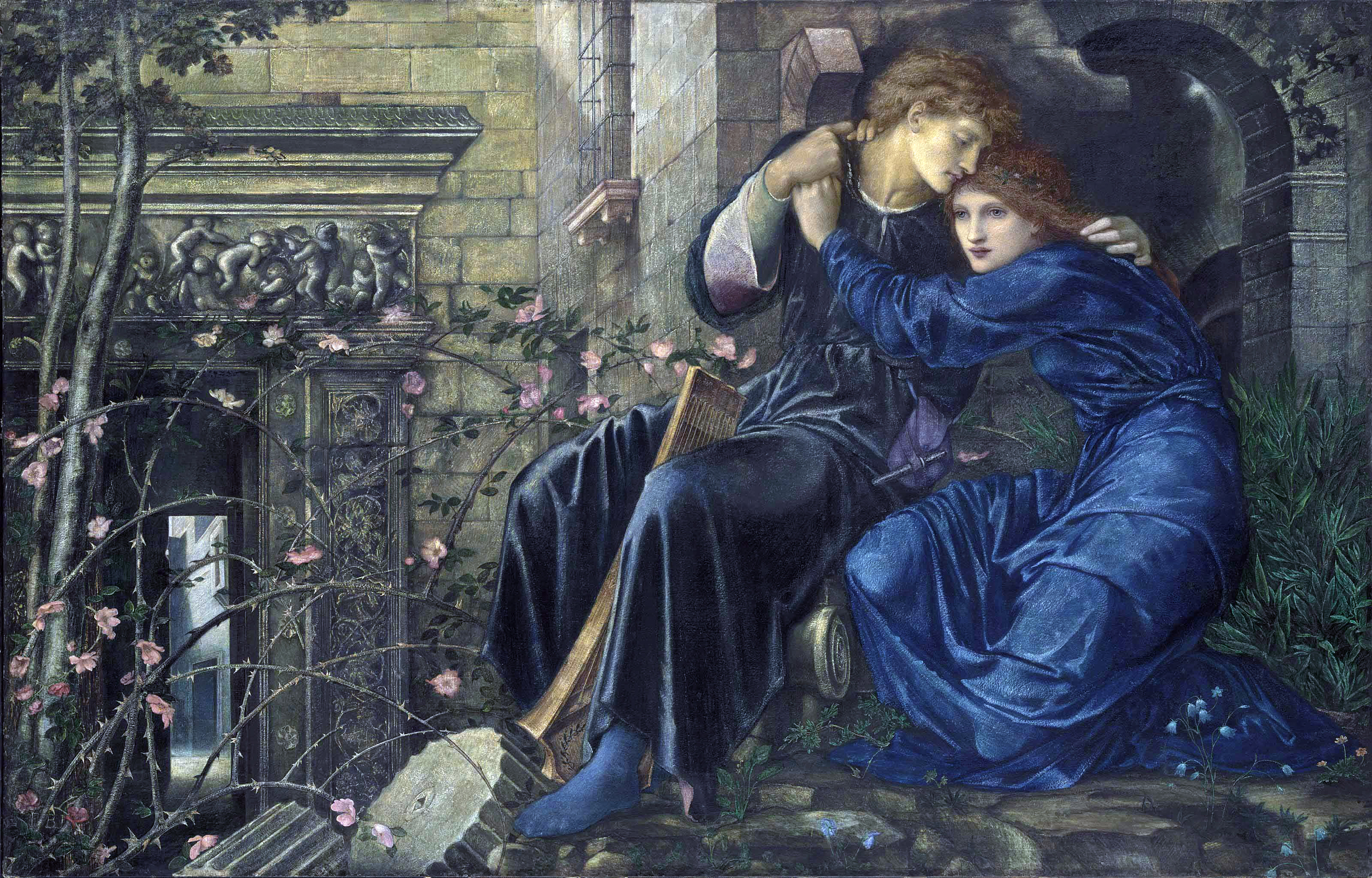
Edward Burne-Jones, Love Among the Ruins, watercolour, 1870–1873, private collection

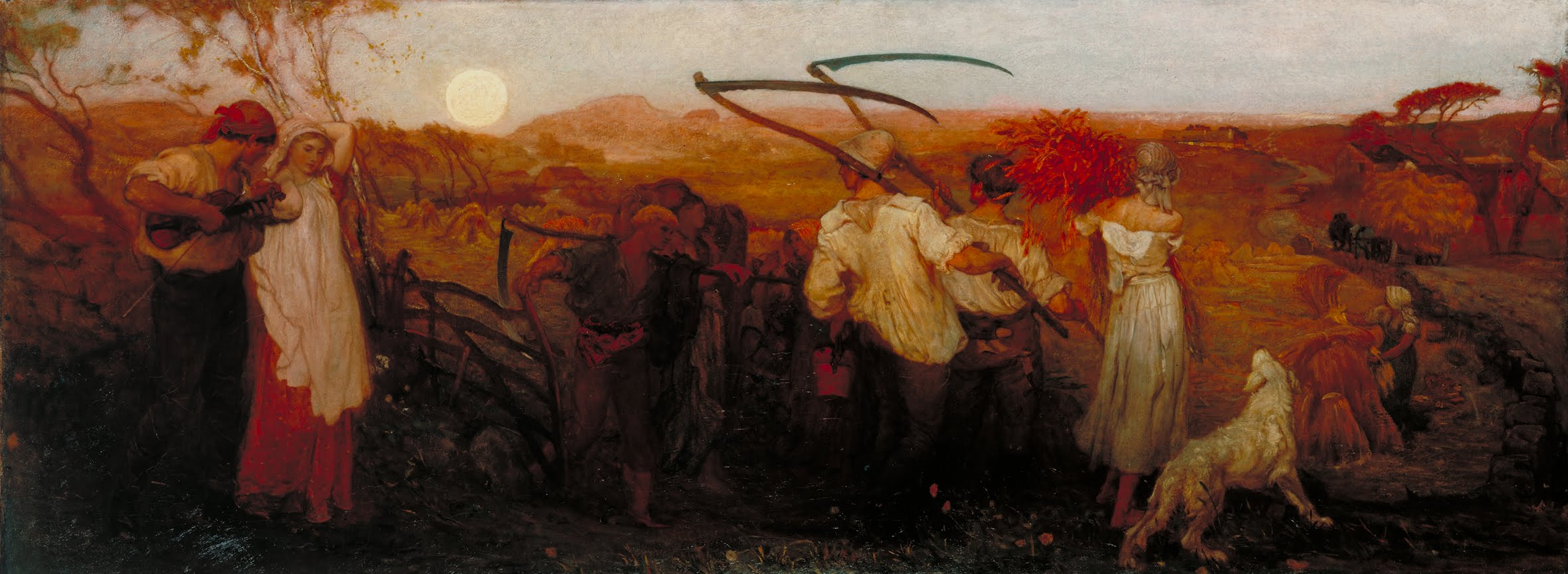
George Heming Mason, The Harvest Moon, 1872, Tate Britain, London

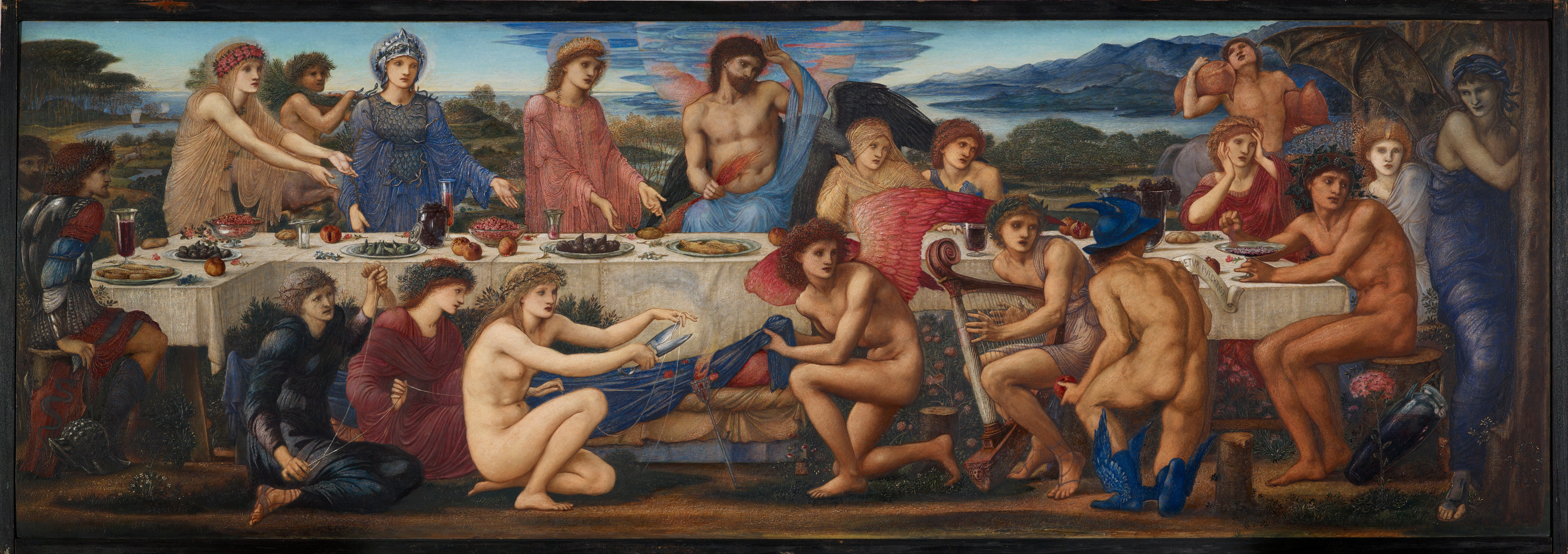
Edward Burne-Jones, The Feast of Peleus, (1872, reworked 1881), Birmingham Museum and Art Gallery, UK

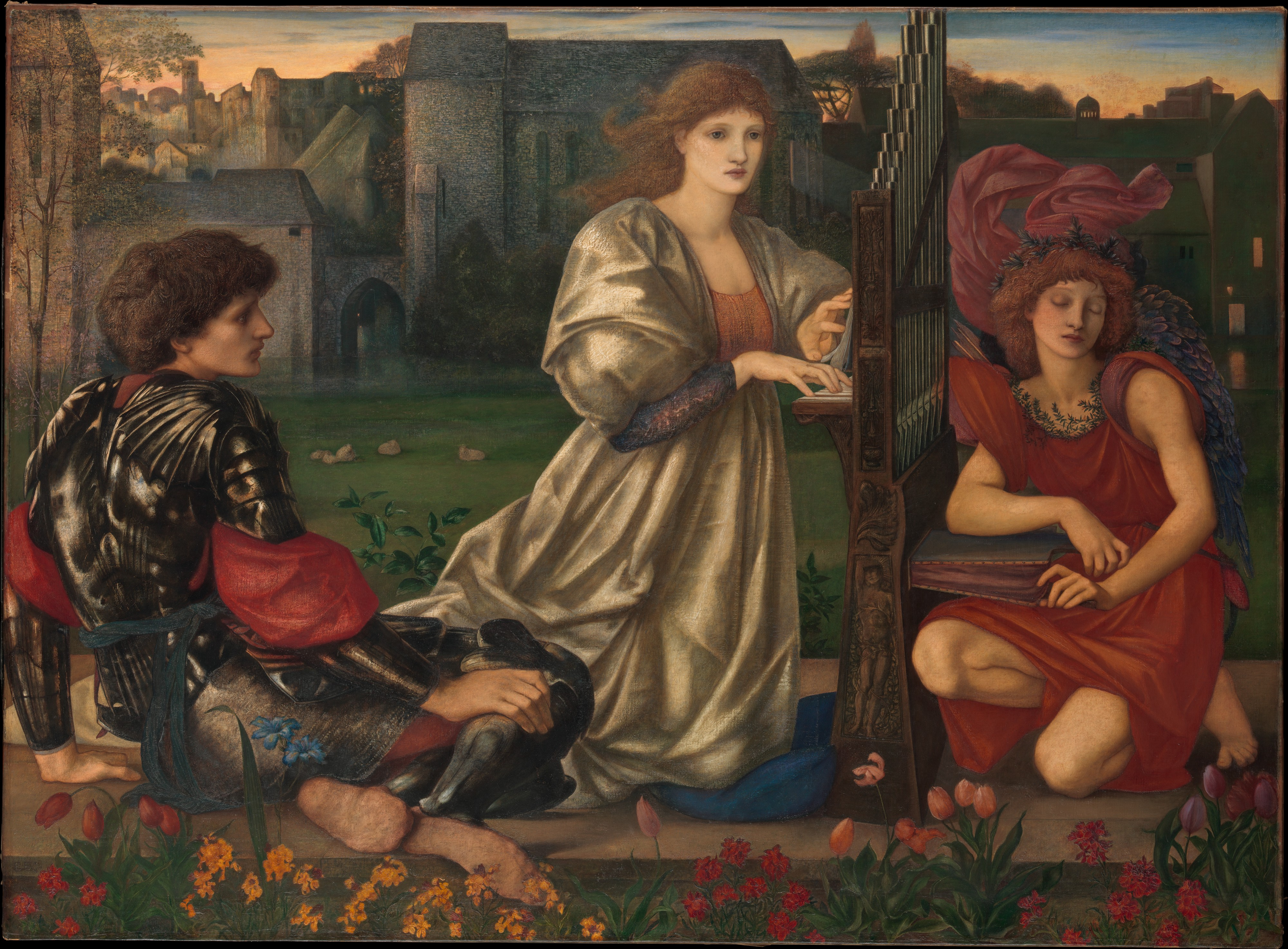
Edward Burne-Jones, The Love Song, 1877, Metropolitan Museum of Art, New York City

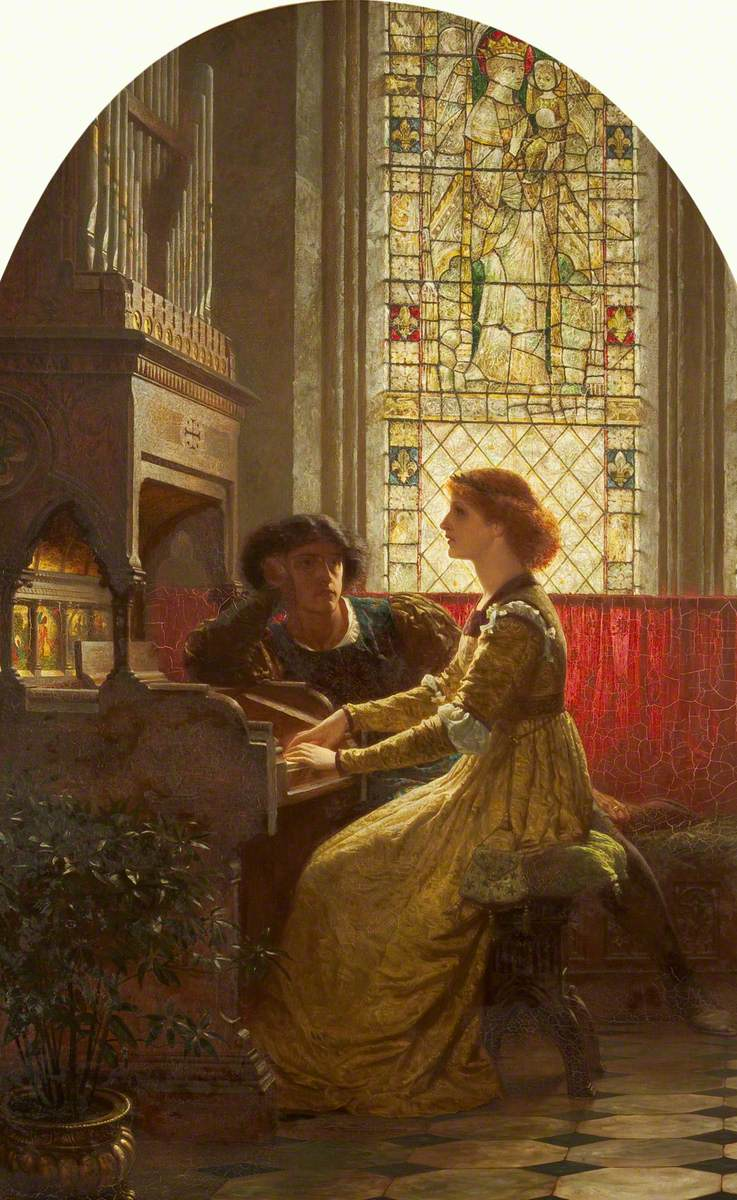
Frank Bernard Dicksee, Harmony, 1879, Towneley Hall Art Gallery and Museum, Burnley, UK

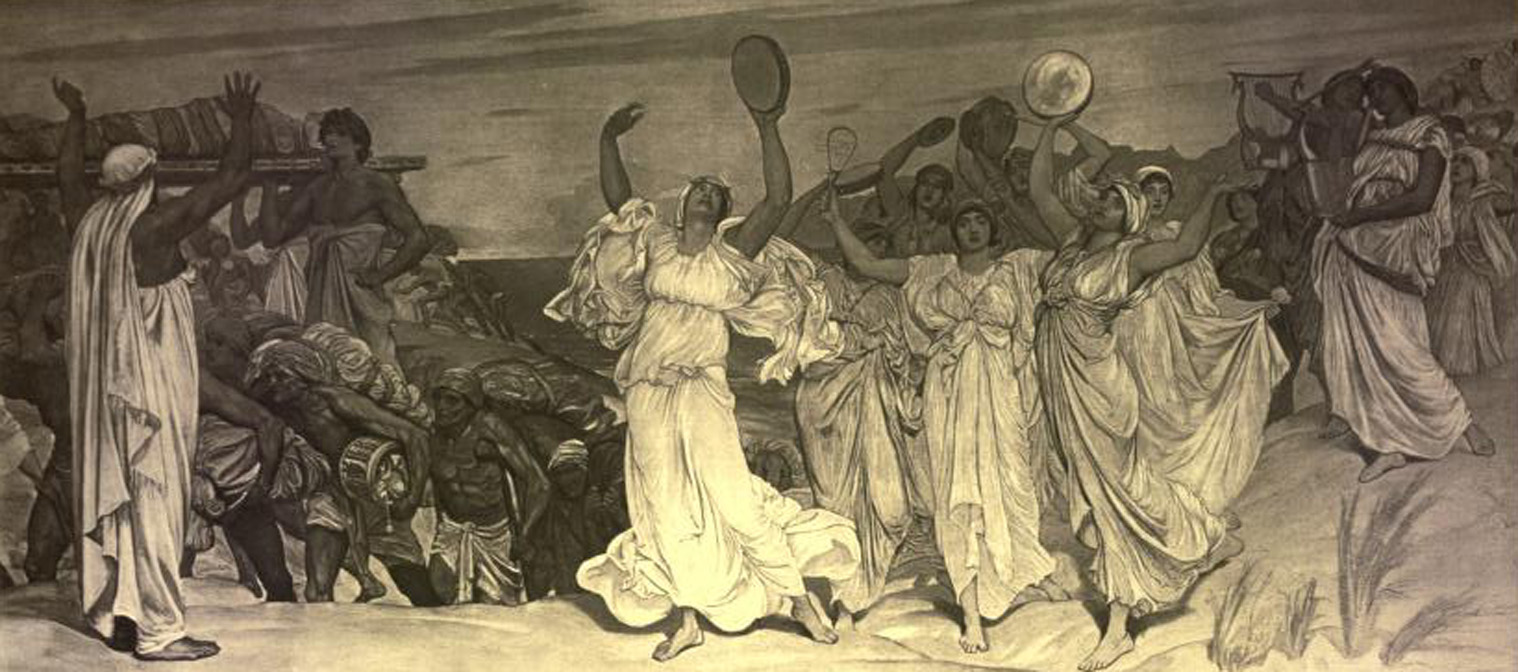
William Blake Richmond, The Song of Miriam, 1880, Chi Mei Museum, Taiwan

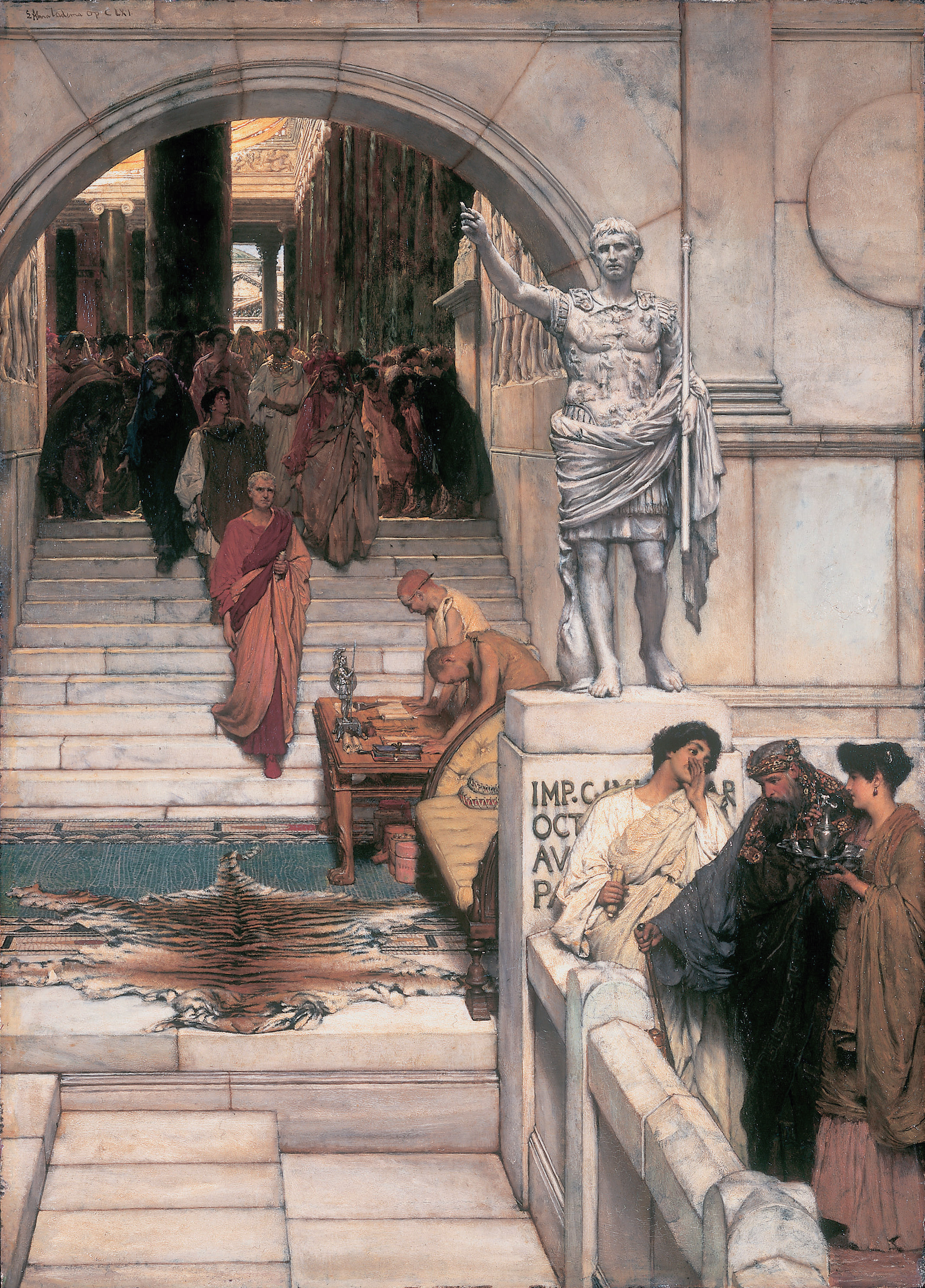
Lawrence Alma-Tadema, An Audience at Agrippa's, 1881, Dick Institute, Kilmarnock, UK

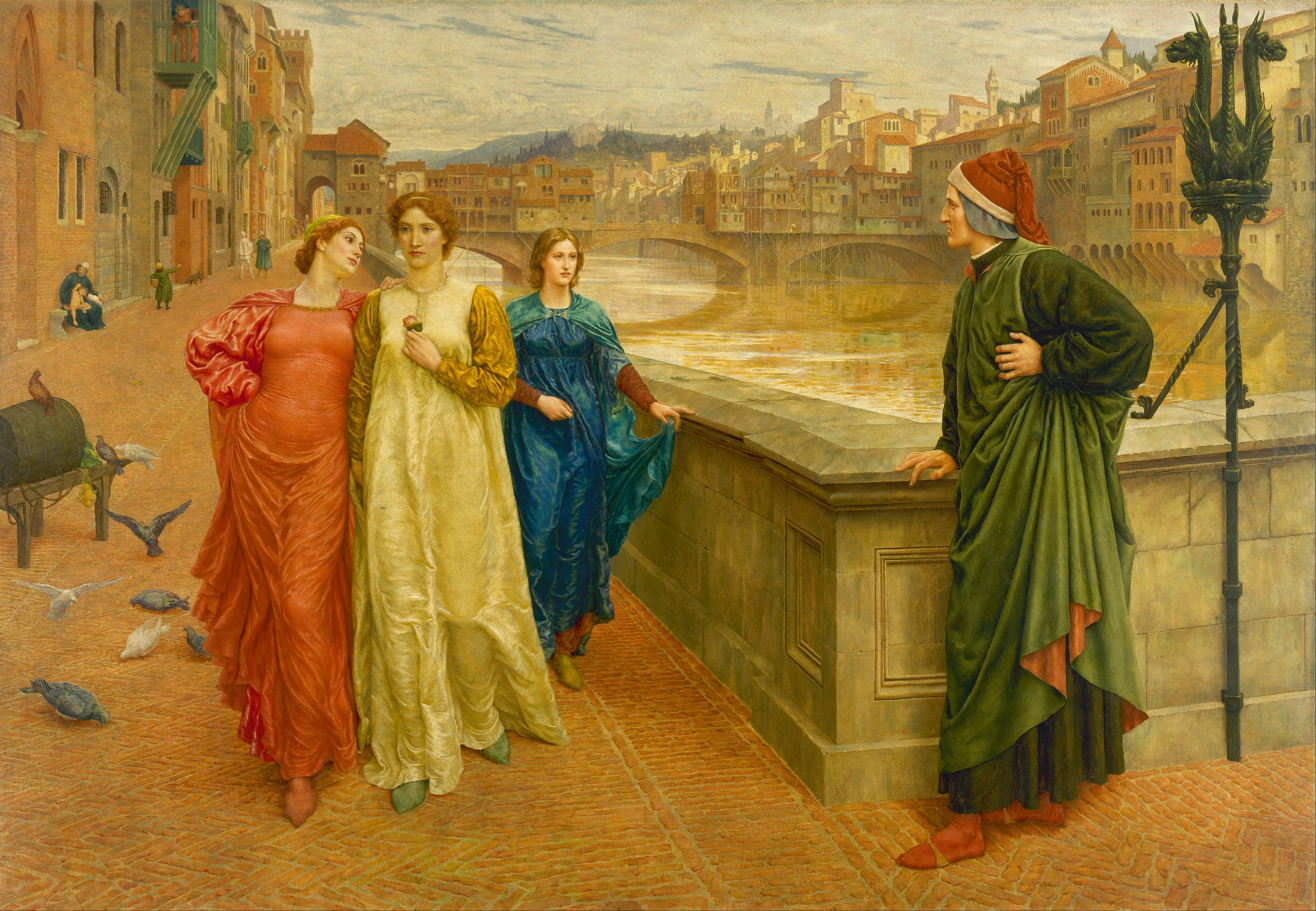
Henry Holiday, Dante and Beatrice, 1883, Walker Art Gallery, Liverpool, UK

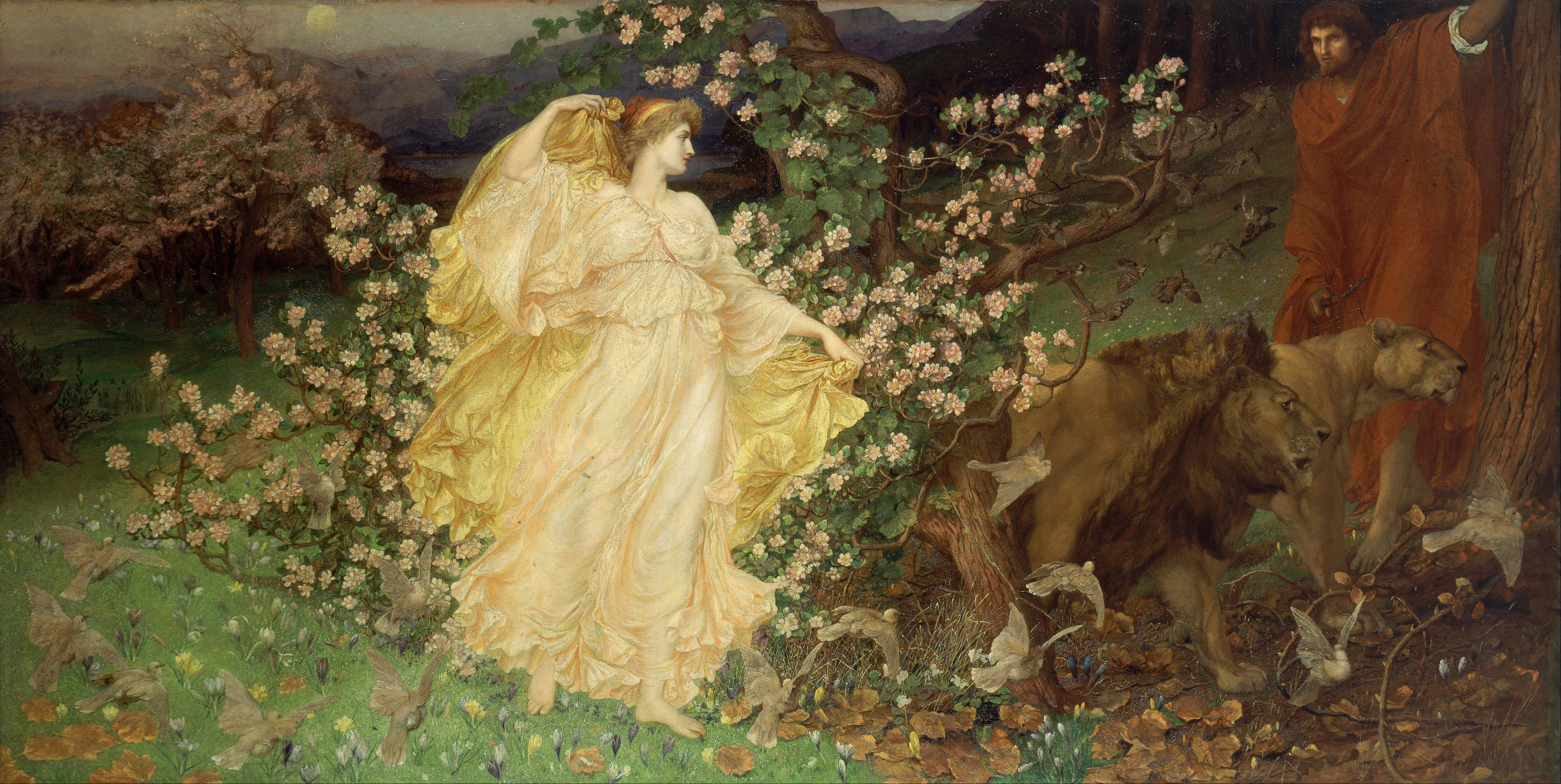
William Blake Richmond, Venus and Anchises, 1890, Walker Art Gallery, Liverpool, UK

== Artist ==
=== Paintings ===
Under William Blake Richmond's instruction, Meo became a proficient landscape painter and exhibited at the Royal Academy of Arts. He assisted Richmond on the frescoes of Christ Church, Cheltenham (1893–95).

The Public Catalogue Foundation lists four paintings by Meo in public ownership in the United Kingdom. Looking towards London from the Heath; Tooley's Farm; and Wyldes Farm are in the collection of the Camden Council. Arundel Castle, West Sussex, Looking from the Back of the Railway Station is in the collection of Eastbourne's Towner Gallery.

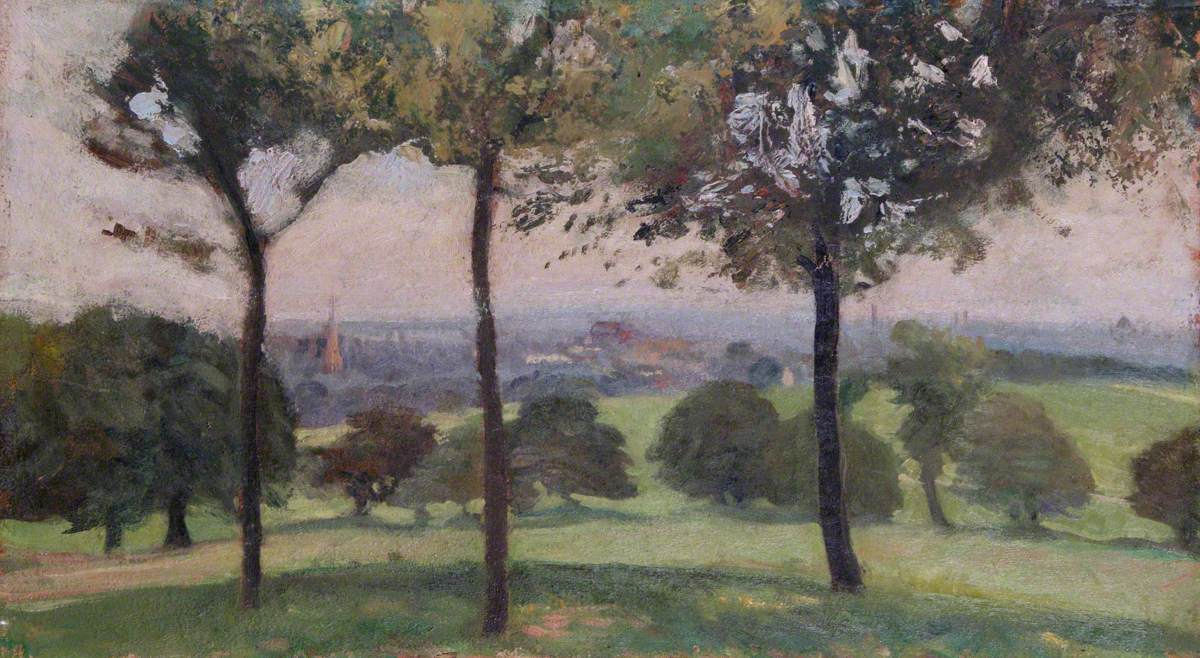
Gaetano Meo, Looking towards London from the Heath (year), Holborn Library, Camden, London

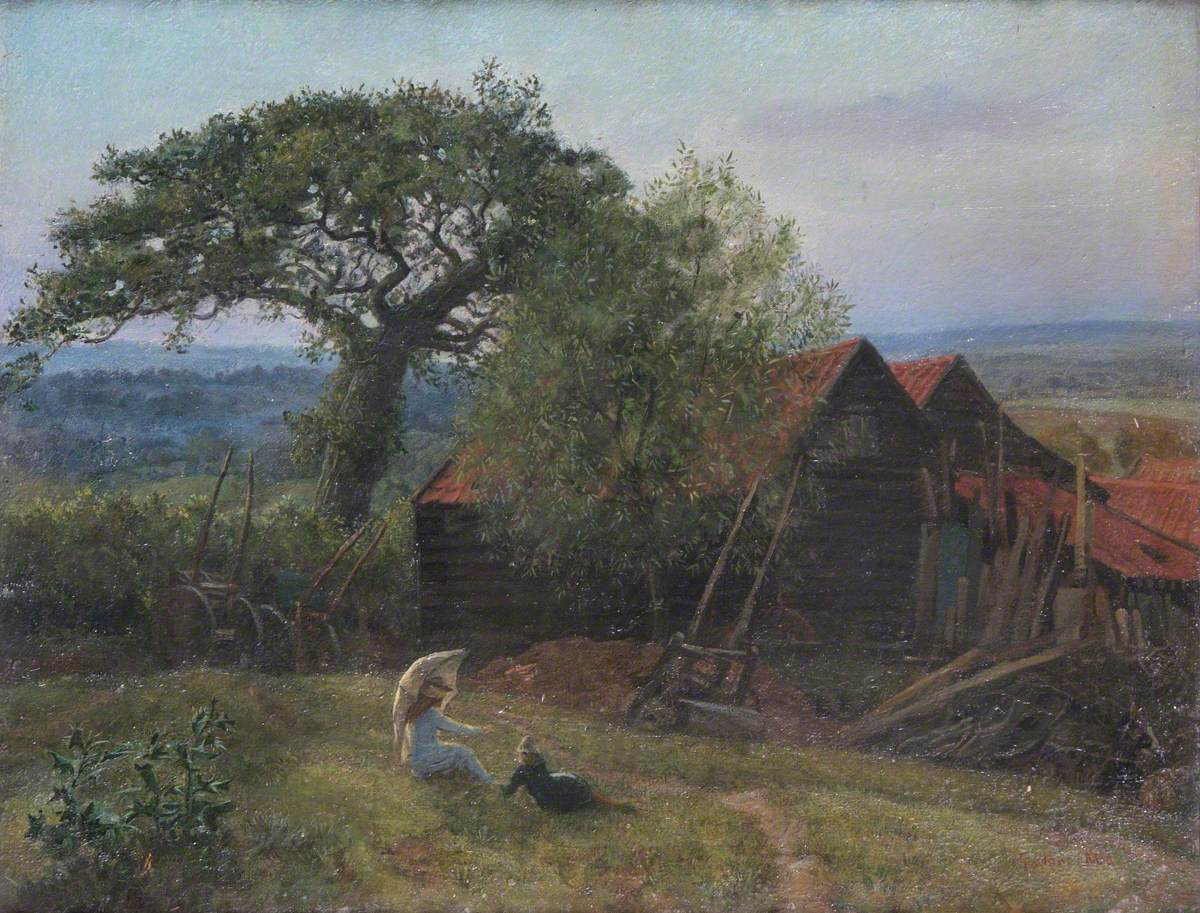
Gaetano Meo, Tooley's Farm (year), Holborn Library, Camden, London

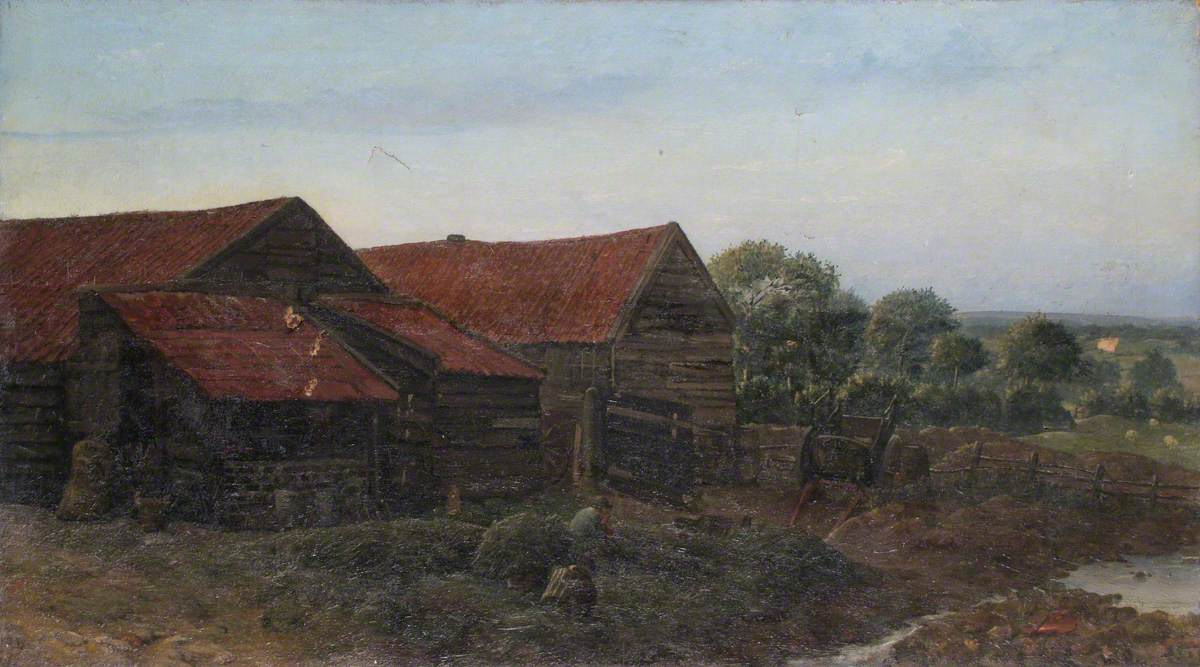
Gaetano Meo, Wyldes Farm (year), Holborn Library, Camden, London

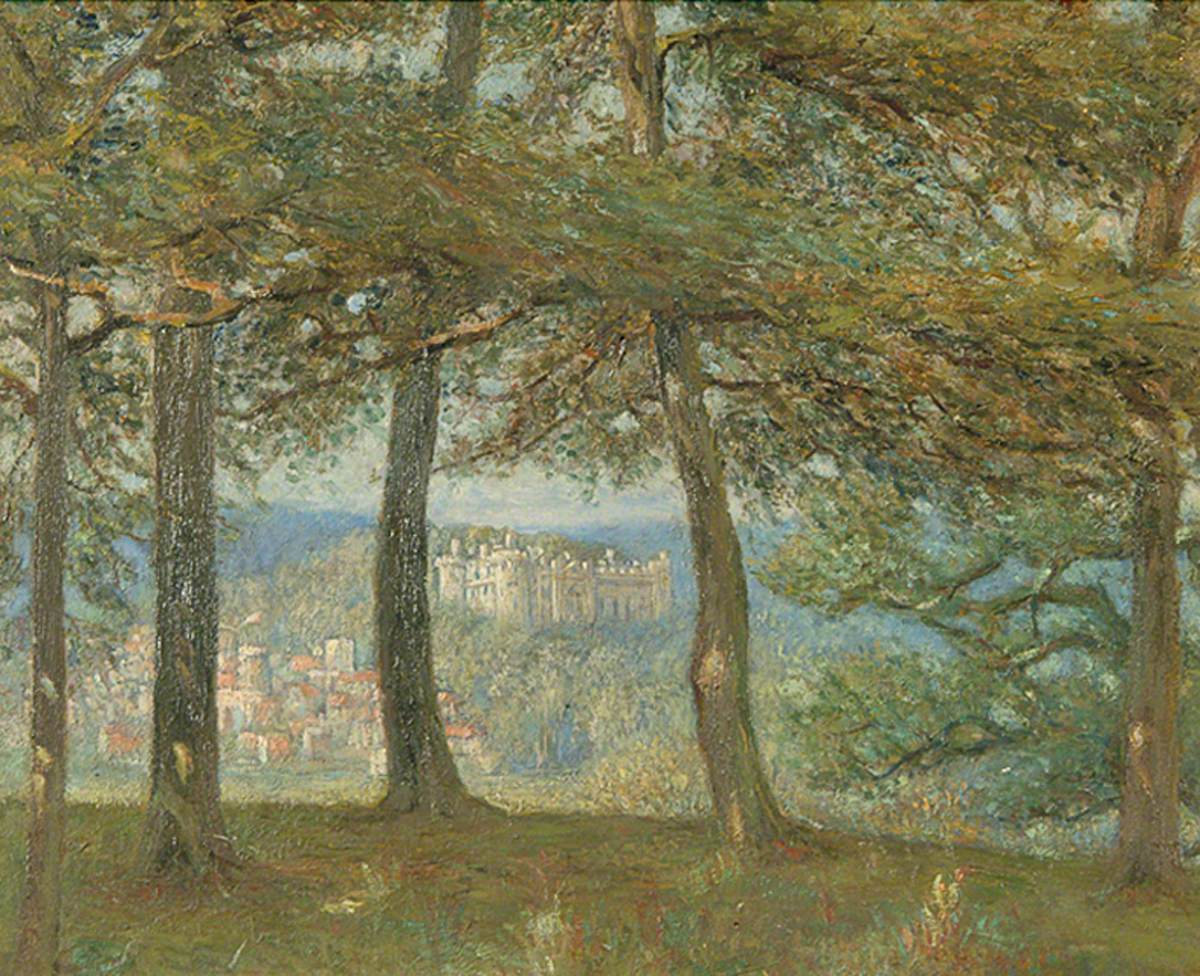
Gaetano Meo, Arundel Castle, West Sussex, Looking from the Back of the Railway Station (year), Towner Eastbourne Gallery, East Sussex

=== Stained glass ===
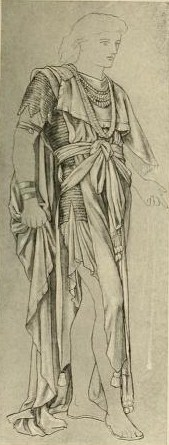
Henry Holiday, Study of Drapery

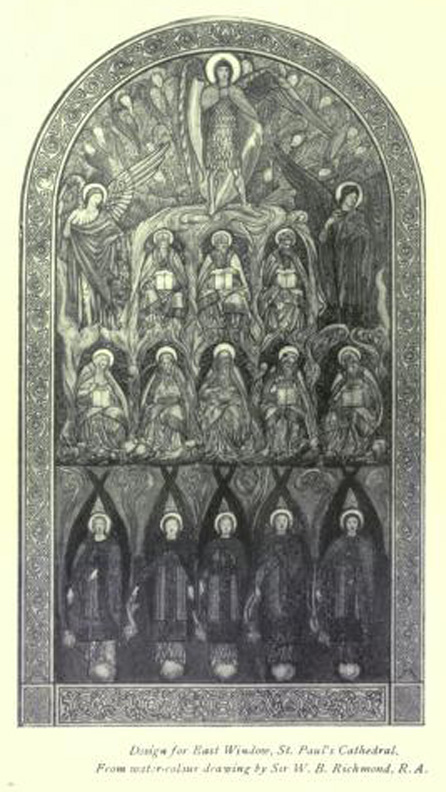
William Blake Richmond, Cartoon for the central apse stained glass window in St. Paul's Cathedral, (1892–1893), Victoria & Albert Museum, London

Henry Holiday may be best known as the illustrator for Lewis Carroll's The Hunting of the Snark (1876). "Holiday was chief designer for the stained-glass makers James Powell & Sons (Whitefriar's Glass) from 1863 to 1891, and from 1875 he employed Meo in his cartoons." By 1880, Meo had become Holiday's assistant, helping to execute his stained-glass designs.

Holiday and Richmond jointly sponsored Meo for British citizenship, that was granted in 1888. To celebrate Meo's naturalization, Holiday hosted a party, that was attended by friends, artists and art patrons, including the Duke of Devonshire. Holiday wrote satirical lyrics, tailored to Meo and set to a Gilbert and Sullivan song from H.M.S. Pinafore. From the piano, Holiday performed his parody of "He Is an Englishman," and led all in singing the choruses.

Meo assisted Richmond on stained-glass windows for the apse of St. Paul's Cathedral, including the great arched east window behind the high altar. (Richmond's windows were destroyed in 1940, during The Blitz of World War II.)

Meo also assisted Richmond on three stained-glass windows for the Lady Chapel of Holy Trinity Church, Sloane Street (1905–10).

Meo designed and executed the east window for the Church of St. Saviour (1902–1904), in St. Albans, Hertfordshire, UK. (Note: "The east window, given by the Architect, Mr. [William] Woodward, was designed and executed by Mr. Gaetano Meo, of Hampstead.")

=== Mosaics ===
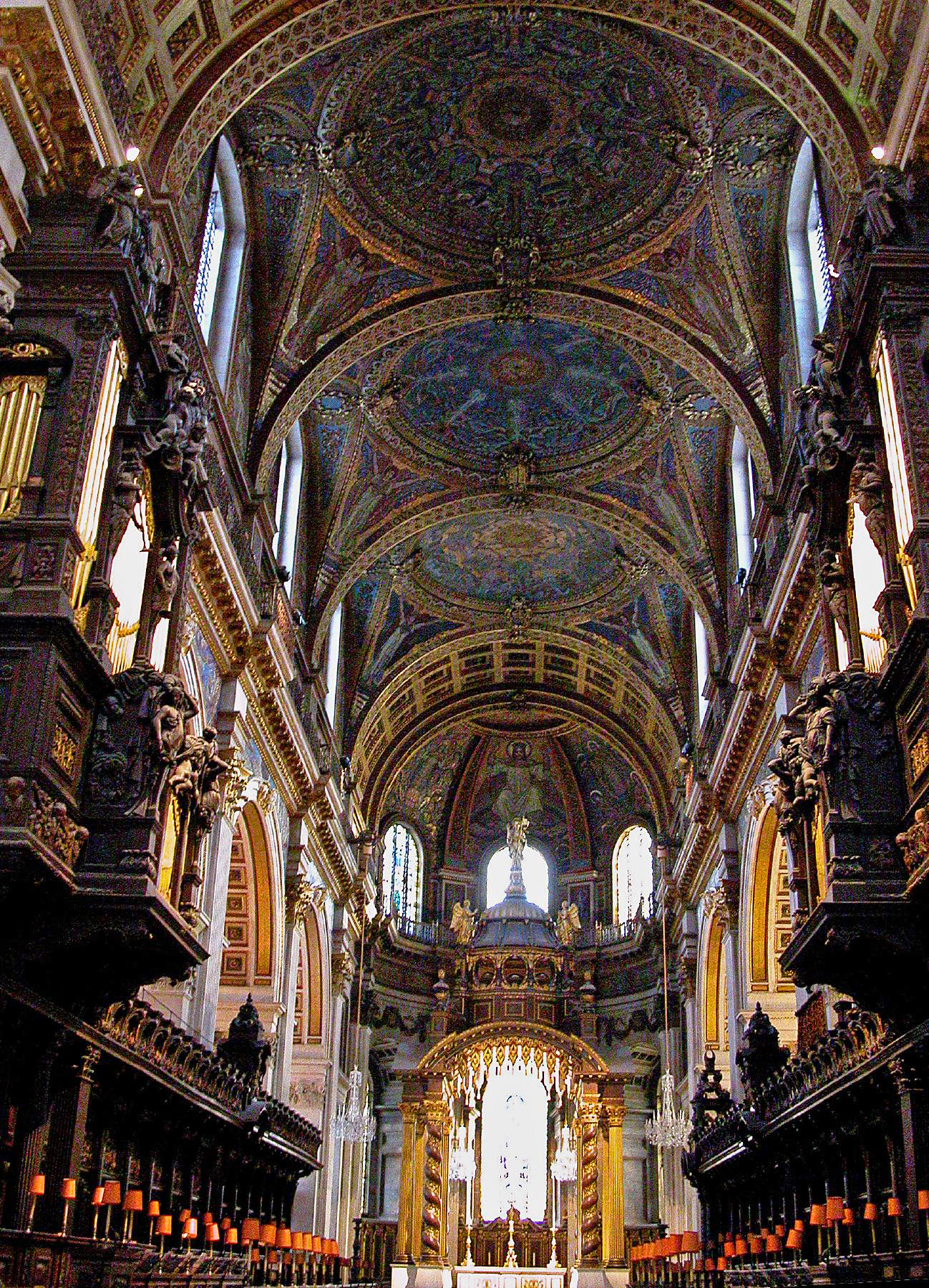
Choir and apse mosaics (1892–1904), St. Paul's Cathedral, London

In the 1880s, Powell & Sons appears to have sent Meo to Italy to study the mosaics of Ravenna, Venice, Sicily and Rome.

In 1891, Richmond was approached about painting murals for St. Paul's Cathedral in London. Instead, Richmond proposed mosaics, arguing that the cathedral's 17th century architect, Sir Christopher Wren, had intended them for its interior decoration, and that mosaics would survive for centuries. The following year Richmond received the design commission to create neo-Byzantine mosaic murals for the walls and ceiling of the cathedral's choir and apse. "Richmond chose to abandon the flat surface of mosaicists like Salviati, in favour of a more vibrant treatment, based on the use of jagged, irregular glass, set at angles to the plaster, so that it would catch the light." The commission was expanded in 1902 to include mosaics for the barrel-vaulted choir aisles and quarterdomes. For nearly twelve years, Meo led the team of craftsmen executing the mosaics in the ancient method, laying the glass piece by piece in situ into the drying plaster. The entire mosaic schedule was completed in 1904.

Meo exhibited a mosaic panel of roses at the 1904 World's Fair in St. Louis, Missouri, USA.

Executing the designs of architect Halsey Ricardo, Meo supervised creation of the large mosaic dome for the hall of Debenham House in London, 1912–1913.

Executing the designs of Scottish architect Robert Weir Schultz, Meo led the team in creating the mosaics for the Chapel of St. Andrew and the Saints of Scotland at Westminster Cathedral, 1913–1915.

Executing his own designs, Meo created mosaic panels for the Church of St. John the Baptist in Clayton, West Yorkshire, 1916–1918.

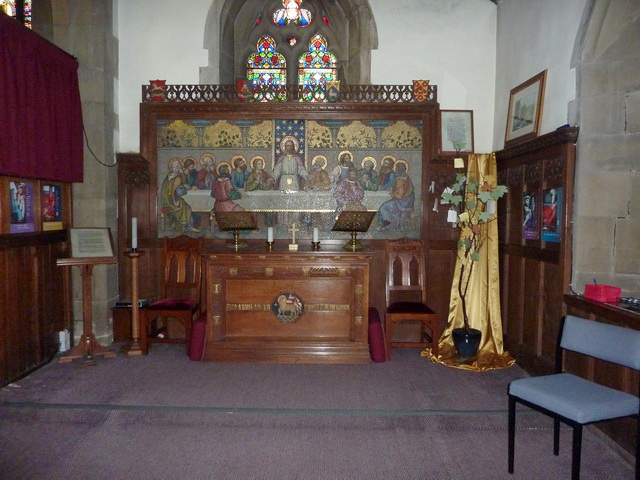
The Last Supper (1916–1918), Lady Chapel, Church of St. John the Baptist, Clayton, West Yorkshire

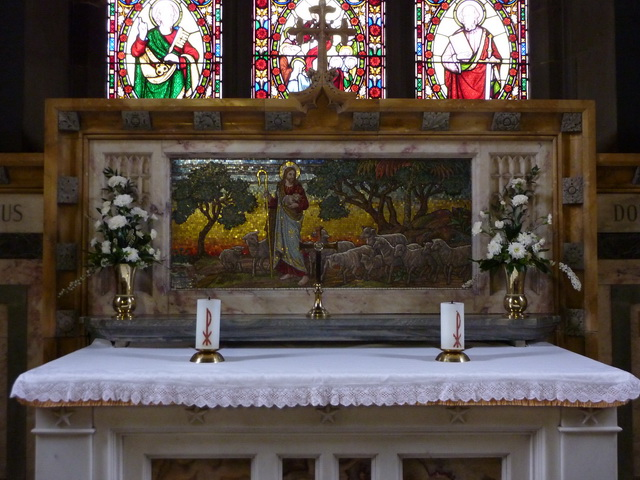
The Good Shepherd (1916–1918), over high altar, Church of St. John the Baptist, Clayton, West Yorkshire

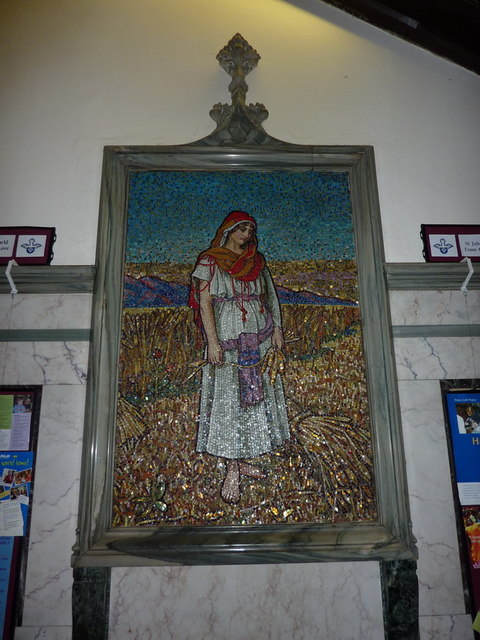
Ruth Amidst the Alien Corn (1916–1918), Church of St. John the Baptist, Clayton, West Yorkshire

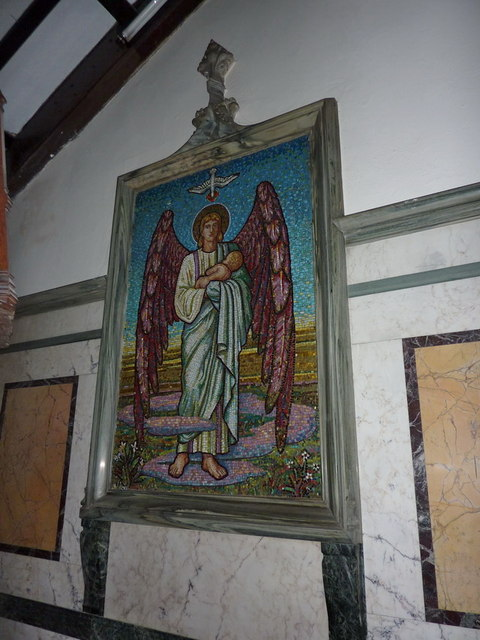
The Angel Gabriel and the Infant St. John (1916–1918), Church of St. John the Baptist, Clayton, West Yorkshire

== Personal ==
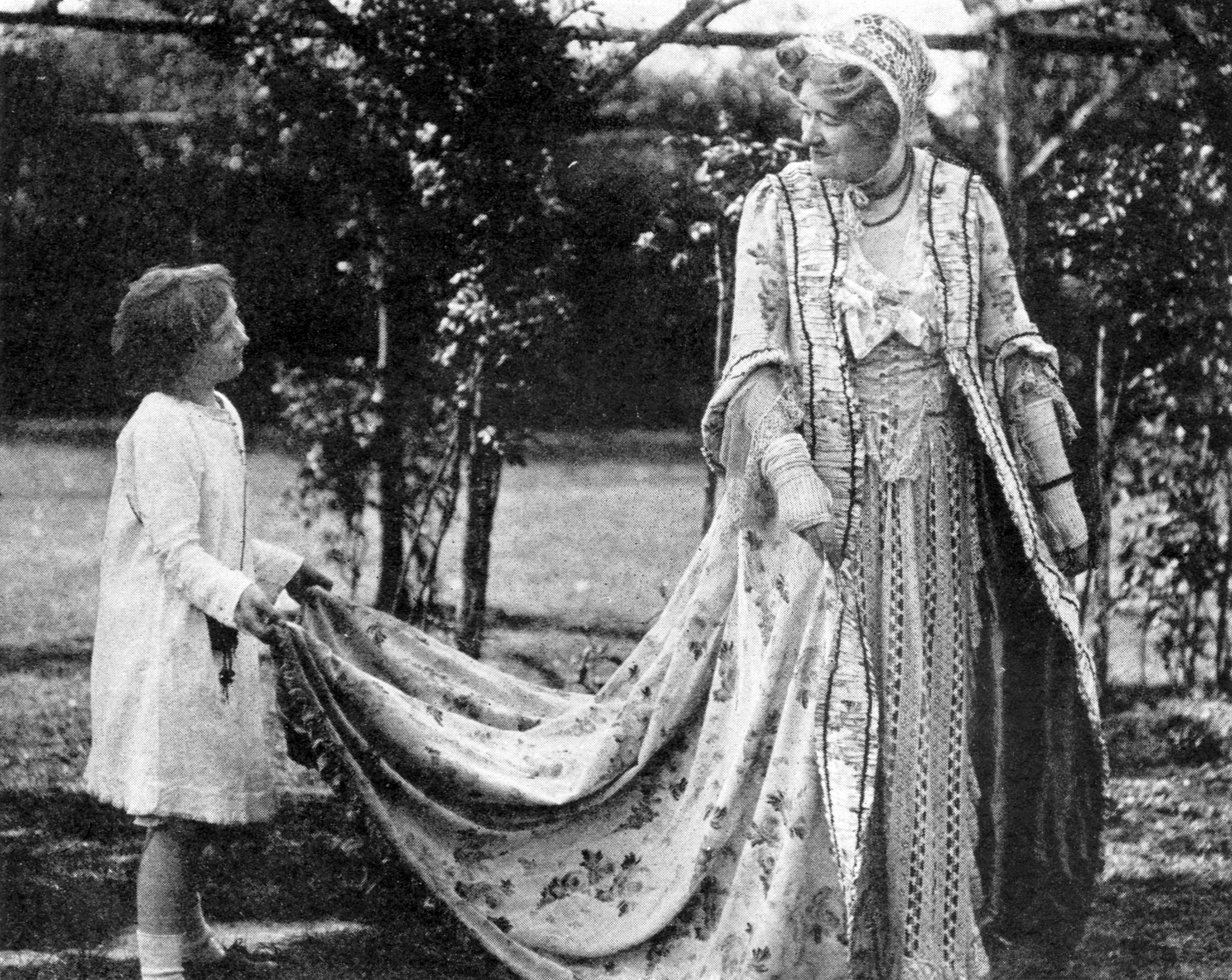
Meo's granddaughter, Nelly Gordon Craig, with her paternal grandmother, Dame Ellen Terry, c.1912.

In 1868, Meo married Agnes Morton (1849–1921), from Ulster, Ireland. They set up home in Hampstead, and had six children—three sons and three daughters:

- Francesco Giovanni Luigi Meo (16 August 1872, Fulham, London – 21 January 1933, East Dulwich, London)
- Margarita Maria Agnes Meo (1876, Kensington, London – 6 March 1956, Eastbourne, London)
- Humbert James "Little Bertie" Meo (19 July 1878, Hampstead, London – 22 September 1885, Hendon, London)
- Elena Fortuna Meo (October 1879, Hampstead, London – 24 December 1957). A professional violinist, she bore three illegitimate children by married scenic designer, art director and writer Edward Gordon Craig (1872–1966), son of actress Dame Ellen Terry. (Note: Edward Gordon Craig married Helen Mary "May" Gibson in 1893, and they had five children together. Elena Meo and Craig met in 1900, and they had three children together: Ellen (1903–1904), Nell (1904–1975), (Note: "1904 – 11 January – Birth of Nell, second child of EGC and Elena Meo; death of their first child, Ellen, in this period.") and Edward (1905–1998). Craig lived with Elena Meo and their two surviving children on and off, in England and Italy. May Gibson Craig would not consent to a divorce until 1932, after Craig and Elena Meo had permanently separated. Craig fathered other illegitimate children: a daughter with actress Jess Dorynne, (Note: "1900 – November – Birth of Kitty, daughter of Edward Gordon Craig and Jess Dorynne") a daughter with dancer Isadora Duncan, a son with poet Dorothy Nevile Lees, and a daughter with his secretary/translator Daphne Woodward.)
- Alfonzo Giovanni Battista Meo (4 September 1890, Hampstead, London – 10 June 1916, Somme, France). Lieutenant Giovanni Meo died in World War I during the buildup to the Battle of the Somme.
- Taormina Bertha Meo (1891, Hampstead, London – 1959, Eastbourne, London)

Following his wife's 1921 death, Meo created a grave marker in Hampstead Cemetery that featured a glass mosaic of the Madonna and Child. Gaetano and Agnes Meo and their son "Little Bertie," who died at age 7, were buried there.

Film art designer and writer Edward Carrick—son of Elena Meo and Edward Gordon Craig—never finished his biography of his grandfather, Gaetano Meo. He dramatized portions of his manuscript for a 25 November 1994 broadcast on BBC Radio 3.

Helen Craig—great-granddaughter of Gaetano Meo, and daughter of Edward and Helen Godfrey Carrick—is the illustrator of the Angelina Ballerina children's stories. In 2018, she and mosaic artist Tessa Hunkin restored the Meo grave at Hampstead Cemetery.
