= Charlotte Spencer (actress) =

British actress, dancer, and singer (born 1991)

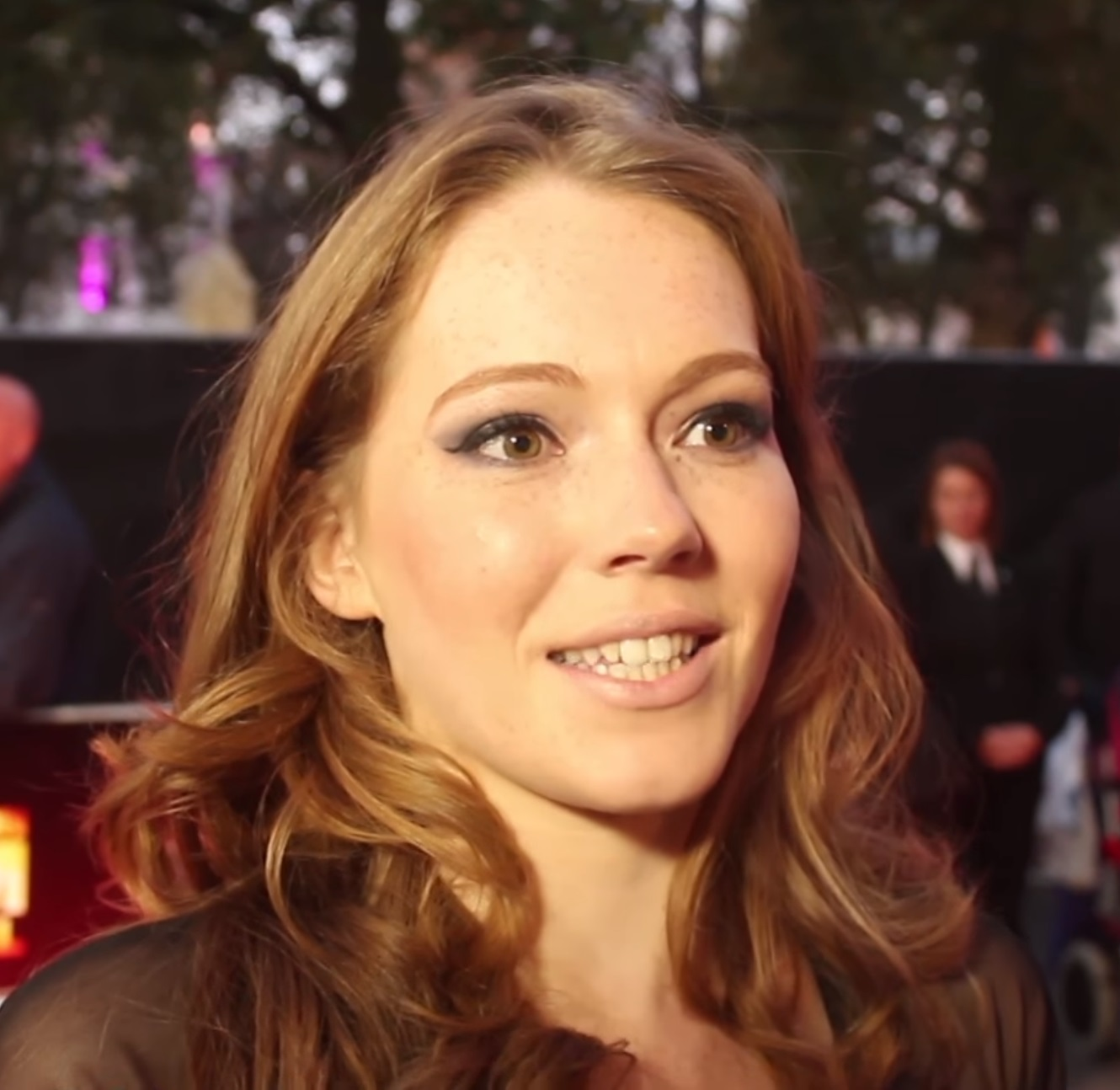
- Spencer at the BFI London Film Festival in 2014
- Born: 1990 or 1991; Harlow, Essex, England
- Education: Sylvia Young Theatre School
- Occupations: Actress, singer, dancer
- Years active: 2004–present

Charlotte Spencer (born 1990 or 1991) is an English actress, dancer and singer. She played the female lead in The Living and the Dead.

== Early life and education ==
Charlotte Spencer was born in 1990 or 1991 in Harlow, Essex, to Peter and Karen. She has a younger sister and brother. Her father is a builder and her mother worked in a school. She started ballet aged three and wanted to perform since then.

At the age of 11, her parents sent her to the Sylvia Young Theatre School in Marylebone, London. Her parents remortgaged their house to support her acting career.

== Career ==
=== Theatre ===
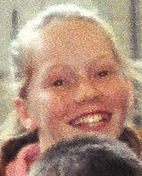
Spencer with the cast of Mary Poppins in 2004

Spencer made her acting debut at the age of 12 as Jane Banks in Richard Eyre's 2004 production of the musical Mary Poppins. In 2009, she played Bet in Oliver!. In 2013, Eyre again cast her, this time as Christine Keeler, in the Andrew Lloyd Webber musical Stephen Ward, with Charlotte Blackledge as Mandy Rice-Davies. The show's run was cancelled shortly afterwards.

=== Film and television ===
Spencer appeared as Dexter Fletcher's daughter in Hotel Babylon. She was the voice of Angelina Ballerina on Angelina Ballerina: The Next Steps when she was 17, and has since worked as a voice actor, as Nettles in the 2018 television series Watership Down and as a continuity announcer for the Disney Channel. She appeared in the films Wild Bill and Les Misérables in 2011 and then Dark Shadows with Johnny Depp in 2012.

After her theatre appearance as Christine Keeler ended, Spencer had a small part in Line of Duty and then was cast by the same director as the jockey Tina Fallon in the 2014 E4 television series Glue. She was nominated for the British Academy Television Award for Best Supporting Actress for this role in 2015. Deadline Hollywood reported that she would star in Broad Squad; in 2015, she appeared in a pilot of Broad Squad as a 1970s police officer on ABC, which was not made into a series. She starred as Niamh in the BFI short, Above, which won Best Short Film at the National Film Awards UK. She played the lead role, Lilly, in the film Bypass with George MacKay and appeared as Ellie in the BBC2 television series Stonemouth.

In the BBC1 horror television series The Living and the Dead, broadcast in June 2016, she played the role of Charlotte Appelby, a photographer turned housewife, with Colin Morgan.

In May 2016, she filmed the BBC/NFTS short film Diagnosis in the lead role of Sally, a woman who acts in medical role play.

She appeared in another period drama in autumn 2019, as Esther Denham in Sanditon, a television adaptation of the unfinished Jane Austen novel. She defended the inclusion of sex and nudity as historically accurate and "humanising". In 2019 Spencer was cast to play a hapless youth in the teen horror film Gateway, which uses the Momo Challenge as a plot device.

In April 2022, Spencer was confirmed as a cast member in BBC Drama The Gold, appearing as a full cast member. In November 2023, it was confirmed the show would be renewed for a second season.

== Recognition and awards ==
Screen International magazine named her a Star of Tomorrow 2015.Also in 2015, she was nominated for a best actress award for Stonemouth at BAFTA Scotland.

== Filmography ==
=== Film ===
Year	Title	Role	Notes	
2010	Rainbow Magic: Return to Rainspell Island	Brill (voice)	Direct-to-video anime film	
2011	Wild Bill	Steph		
2011	Angelina Ballerina: Shining Star Trophy Movie	Angelina Mouseling (voice)		
2012	Angelina Ballerina: Dreams Do Come True	Angelina Mouseling (voice)		
2012	Dark Shadows	Coat Check Girl		
2012	2013	Mickey & Michaela Bury Their Dad	Michaela	Short film
2014	Bypass	Lilly		
2015	Above	Niamh	Short films	
2017	Diagnosis	Sally	Short films	
2018	O Christmas Tree	Sadie	Short films	
2020	Misbehaviour	Marjorie Jones		
2020	The Duke	Pammy		
2021	Cinderella	Narissa		

=== Television ===
Year	Title	Role	Notes
2007	Five Days	Jaime	Series 1; episodes 1 & 5: "Day One" & "Day Seventy Nine"
2008	Hotel Babylon	Liz Casemore	Series 3; episode 4
2008	Genie in the House	Cara	Series 3; episode 2: "Look to the Future"
2008–2010	Angelina Ballerina: The Next Steps	Angelina Mouseling (voice)	Series 1 & 2; 14 episodes. UK & U.S. version
2013	Homeboys	Charley	Television film
2014	Line of Duty	Carly Kirk	Series 2; episodes 4–6
2014	Glue	Tina Fallon	Mini-series; episodes 1–8
2015	Stonemouth	Ellie Murston	Mini-series; episodes 1 & 2: "Stonemouth: Parts 1 & 2"
2015	Broad Squad	Molly	Television film
2016	The Living and the Dead	Charlotte Appleby	Episodes 1–6
2018	Watership Down	Nettle (voice)	Mini-series; episodes 1–4
2019–2022	Sanditon	Esther Denham/Lady Babington	Series 1 & 2; 14 episodes
2020	Baghdad Central	Megan Ford	Episodes 1–5
2020	Us	Karen Petersen	Mini-series; episodes 1 & 2
2020	Soulmates	Heather	Season 1; episode 5: "Break on Through"
2021–2023	Ted Lasso	Red (Mary)	Season 2; episode 9, & season 3; episode 12
2023–2024	The Gold	Nicki Jennings	Series 1 & 2; 12 episodes
2025	Death in Paradise	Danielle Bailey	Series 14; episode 6
