= Helen Craig (writer) =

English children's book illustrator and writer

- Born: 30 August 1934 (age 92); London, UK
- Occupations: Illustrator, writer, sculptor
- Writing career
- Notable work: Angelina Ballerina

Helen Craig (born 30 August 1934) is an English children's book illustrator and writer, a photographer and a sculptor. She is best known for creating the Angelina Ballerina series of children's books with writer Katharine Holabird.

== Early life and education ==
Craig was born in London to the film designer and writer Edward Carrick and his wife, Helen Godfrey. She was evacuated during World War II and educated in Essex, then from 1943 at King Alfred's School in Hertfordshire, and finally in London.

== Career ==
During the 1950s she worked as a portrait photographer in North London, then moved to Spain for 3 years, where she began making ceramic sculptures. Returning to the UK in 1967, Craig began illustrating children's books in 1970. The first book which she had both written and illustrated was The Mouse House ABC, published in 1977. In 1983, Craig illustrated, and Katharine Holabird wrote, the first Angelina Ballerina book about a young mouse, who lives in a cottage in a small village and grows up to be a ballerina, with whom children could identify; more than 25 books followed in the series, some of which have been adapted as television series and stage works.

With co-author Sarah Hayes she created "Bear", a popular children's character who appears in This Is the Bear (1986), This Is the Bear and the Picnic Lunch (1988), and This Is the Bear and the Scary Night (1992). She illustrated two books written by Philippa Pearce. Craig later returned to the medium of sculpture and makes small figurative works. Her artwork, including sculptures, was exhibited in 2025 at Anglia Ruskin University in Cambridge.

== Family ==
Craig's great-grandmother was the stage actress Ellen Terry and her grandfather was theatrical scenic designer Edward Gordon Craig. One of her great-grandfathers was Gaetano Meo (1850–1925) an artist's model, painter and mosaicist, associated with the Pre-Raphelites. In 2018, with the assistance of mosaicist Tessa Hunkin, Craig restored the mosaic gravestone in Hampstead Cemetery that Meo created for his wife Agnes Morton and young son, under which he is also buried.

== See also ==
- Terry family
