= Katharine Holabird =

American writer

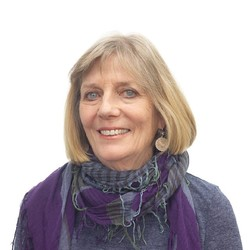
- Born: January 23, 1948 (age 78); Cambridge, Massachusetts, United States
- Education: Francis W. Parker School
- Alma mater: Bennington College
- Spouse: Michael Haggiag (m. 1974)
- Children: 2
- Writing career
- Notable work: Angelina Ballerina
- Website: katharineholabird.com

Katharine Holabird (born January 23, 1948) is an American writer, best known as the author of the Angelina Ballerina series, illustrated by Helen Craig, and the Twinkle series, illustrated by Sarah Warburton.

== Early life and education ==
Born in Cambridge, Massachusetts, the second of four daughters, Holabird grew up in an artistic home in Chicago, and her family spent many summers in Michigan. In 1969, she received a B.A. in literature from Bennington College in Vermont and then worked at Bennington College as a literary editor for a year after her graduation.

== Career ==
Holabird then found herself in Italy as a freelance journalist where she met her husband, Michael Haggiag. The two married in 1974 and moved to London, where she continued to write and worked at a nursery school. She has two daughters, Tara and Alexandra. Later, Holabird met Helen Craig, a London photographer and artist whose illustrations have been inspired by her childhood in rural England. Over the next few years, Craig illustrated several mini-books with mice, and Holabird provided some of the text. In 1983, her third child, Adam, was born.

In 1983, Holabird's first children's book, Angelina Ballerina, was published. Her son Adam was her inspiration for the character Henry, and Angelina's character was inspired by her daughters' love for dressing up and dancing. Holabird wrote the first draft of Angelina Ballerina at the kitchen table with her daughters dancing around her. In fact, the Angelina books were originally about a girl, but then Craig drew a mouse, and Holabird loved it. "The impulsive character of Angelina came alive," says Holabird, "and seemed to pirouette off the page with enthusiasm and energy, while her plump and ebullient body expressed drama and attitude in every twitch of her tail." Angelina is a very emotional character; she is sensitive and often bursts into tears right before offering an apology. She struggles with her conscience but always ends up doing the right thing—which is very familiar to many young children. The universal childhood themes in Angelina include friendship, jealousy, loyalty, & dedication. As a child, she was an avid reader who loved fairy tales and stories about heroic animals, and she frequently saw ballets like Cinderella and Swan Lake with her grandparents. The young, imaginative Holabird loved animals, playing in her tree house, and dancing with her sisters. When reflecting on her childhood, she said: "TV hadn't become a fixture in every home, and we created our own imaginative world." She graduated high school from the Francis Parker School in realistically portray the difficulties of growing up. According to Holabird, it is a ballerina book for "all the passionate little dancers and performers in the world," including her own two daughters, which is why she "decided to explore the impulsive, highly emotional character of a small but determined ballerina."

The first American edition of Angelina Ballerina was published in 1984. A year later, Holabird received the Kentucky Bluegrass Award for Angelina Ballerina. In 1986 and 1987, she received the ALA Notable Book Awards. Angelina's Christmas was selected as Child Study Association's Children's Book of the Year in 1987. The following year, Holabird and Craig published Alexander and the Dragon, their first Alexander book, aimed at preschool children who want to be consoled about bedtime monsters. In 1990, Holabird wrote the Alexander sequel, Alexander and the Magic Boat, which portrays a strong mother/son relationship while the two go on a voyage to imaginary worlds. Also in 1990, Holabird received the British Book Design and Production award.

In 1999, HIT Entertainment in London (known for Thomas the Tank Engine, Bob the Builder, and Barney) secured the rights for Angelina Ballerina and commissioned Grand Slamm Children's Films to make an animated TV pilot. HIT also developed a lot of Angelina merchandise. Angelina made her worldwide television debut in 2001 on CITV in the United Kingdom. Actress Finty Williams is the voice of Angelina, and her mother, Judi Dench, is Miss Lilly. In 2002, the Angelina series premiered on PBS Kids TV in the United States. Angelina Ballerina's Invitation to the Ballet received the prestigious Oppenheim Platinum Award in the U.S. in 2004. That same year, Angelina was named the official spokesperson of National Dance Week in the United States. In 2005, Angelina made her debut on PBS Kids Sprout, a 24-hour digital television channel for preschoolers in the U.S.

Holabird was honored in 2006 with an invitation to Queen Elizabeth's 80th birthday party at Buckingham Palace. That same year, the entire series of Angelina books was reissued by Grosset and Dunlap in the United States. Also in 2006, The Angelina Ballerina Dance Academy debuted with special Angelina ballet classes across England. Angelina's Star Performance, an original ballet based on Angelina at the Palace, debuted in 2007 in London with the English National Ballet. Holabird is hoping to release a new theatrical pop-up Angelina book in 2008. Together, Holabird and Craig have now published a total of ten Angelina books and two Alexander books. Overall, the Angelina books have been translated into more than 20 languages.

Holabird speaks English, French, Italian, and a bit of Spanish. Her favorite books are Charlotte's Web, Black Beauty, and the Harry Potter series. She writes in a blue room with a scenic view upstairs in her London home, and it usually takes her six to eight weeks to write an Angelina book. After that, each book goes to Helen Craig for at least three months to be illustrated; then it goes to the publisher and is usually published nine months later.

Her most recent work, Twinkle, is about a child fairy that goes to the Fairy School for Music and Magic. The series was written by Holabird and illustrated by Welsh artist Sarah Warburton.
