= Angelina Ballerina =

Children's book series

- Author: Katharine Holabird
- Illustrator: Helen Craig
- Cover artist: Helen Craig
- Country: United Kingdom
- Language: English (original international)
- Genre: Children's literature
- Publisher: Aurum Press; Grosset & Dunlap; Penguin Young Readers
- Published: 1983–present
- No. of books: 67

Angelina Ballerina is a children's book series by author Katharine Holabird and illustrator Helen Craig about an anthropomorphic mouse named Angelina Jeanette Mouseling who is training to become a ballerina.

== History ==
The first book in the series was published in 1983, and since then, there have been over 20 books in the series. The series is set in Chipping Cheddar, a place that is similar to 1920s London, and is inhabited by anthropomorphic mice. The name Angelina was inspired by an editor named Angela at Aurum Press.

The books have been adapted by HIT Entertainment into two animated television series: Angelina Ballerina (2001-2006) and the CGI-animated Angelina Ballerina: The Next Steps (2009-2010). It has also been adapted as a touring ballet.

== Books ==
№	Book	Year
1	Angelina Ballerina	1983
2	Angelina and the Princess	1984
3	Angelina at the Fair	1985
4	Angelina's Christmas	1985
5	Angelina on Stage	1986
6	Angelina and Alice	1987
7	Angelina's Birthday	1989
8	Angelina's Baby Sister	1991
9	Angelina Ice Skates	1993
10	Angelina's Halloween	2000
11	Angelina and the Butterfly (story adapted from the TV series)	2001
12	Angelina's Ballet Class	2001
13	Angelina and Henry	2002
14	Angelina Loves (based on the story by Katharine Holabird)	2002
15	Angelina and the Rag Doll (story adapted from the TV series)	2002
16	Angelina Ballerina's Shapes	2002
17	Angelina Ballerina's Invitation to the Ballet	2003
18	Angelina Ballerina's Christmas Crafts	2003
19	I Want to Be Angelina Ballerina	2004
20	Angelina Ballerina - Multi Activity Book	2004
21	Angelina Ballerina Sticker Activity Book	2004
22	Angelina, Star of the Show	2004
23	Angelina's Silver Locket (based on the stories by Katharine Holabird)	2004
24	Angelina Ballerina: Dress Up Angelina	2004
25	Angelina Ballerina's Jigsaw Puzzle Book	2004
26	Angelina at the Palace	2005
27	Angelina Ballerina's Address Book	2005
28	Angelina's Diary #1: The Best Sleepover Ever!	2005
29	Angelina's Diary #2: A Party for the Princess	2005
30	Angelina's Diary #3: A Very Special Secret	2006
31	Angelina's Diary #4: The Bridesmaid Ballet	2006
32	Angelina Has the Hiccups!	2006
33	A Really-Truly Special Day!	2006
34	A Very Special Tea Party	2007
35	Angelina and the Royal Wedding	2010
36	Angelina Ballerina's Pop-Up and Play Sleepover Party	2010
37	Angelina's Showtime Collection	2011
38	Angelina's Silly Little Sister	2013
39	Angelina's Big City Ballet	2014
40	Angelina and the Easter Bonnet	2014
41	Angelina's Cinderella	2014
42	Angelina's Best Friend Dance	2015
43	Angelina at Ballet Camp	2015
44	Angelina's Pet	2015
45	Angelina and the Flower Garden	2015
46	Angelina Ballerina and the Tea Party	2015
47	Angelina Ballerina Dresses Up	2016
48	Angelina Ballerina Loves Ice-Skating!	2016
49	Angelina Ballerina Center Stage	2016
50	Angelina Ballerina Dancing Day	2017
51	Angelina Ballerina Tries Again	2017
52	Meet Angelina Ballerina	2017
53	Angelina Ballerina Sleepover Party	2018
54	Angelina Ballerina Big Dreams!	2018
55	Angelina Feels Like Dancing!	2018
56	Angelina Ballerina Step by Step	2018
57	Angelina Ballerina Practice Makes Perfect	2018
58	Angelina Ballerina at Ballet School	2019
59	Angelina and the Valentine's Day Surprise	2019
60	Angelina Ballerina Family Fun Day	2019
61	Angelina Ballerina and the Art Fair	2019
62	Angelina Ballerina and the Tea Party	2019
63	Angelina Ballerina Cupcake Day!	2020
64	Angelina Ballerina Loves the Library	2021
65	Angelina Ballerina Best Big Sister Ever!	2023
66	Angelina Ballerina's Ballet Tour	2023
67	Angelina Ballerina Steps into Ballet	2025
68	Leap High, Angelina Ballerina	2026
69	Angelina's Good Luck	2027
70	Angelina's Ballet Slippers	TBA

== Adaptations ==
The logo of the franchise

In 2001, Angelina Ballerina, a British animated TV series based on the books, was produced by HIT Entertainment in the United Kingdom. The series featured actress Finty Williams as the voice of Angelina, and Judi Dench as Miss Lilly. The series aired on the CITV block on ITV in the United Kingdom and on PBS Kids in the United States, where it was presented by Connecticut Public Television.

A computer-animated revival Angelina Ballerina: The Next Steps premiered on PBS stations in 5 September 2009. It is directed by Davis Doi and animated at SD Entertainment. WNET, after purchasing CPTV's production unit, is the producer of the program.

English National Ballet took a live version of Angelina Ballerina called Angelina's Star Performance on tour in autumn 2007.

A second revival was announced in 2015, was to be co-produced by Mattel (who acquired HIT Entertainment in 2012) and 9 Story Media Group. A revival of Barney & Friends was announced at the same time. However, whilst Barney eventually got revived as Barney's World, no news nor updates have been given for the Angelina Ballerina reboot.
