= G.I. Joe: America's Elite =

US comic book series

- Cover image for G.I. Joe: America's Elite #1.

Publication information
- Publisher: Devil's Due Publishing
- Schedule: Monthly
- Publication date: June 2005 – June 2007
- No. of issues: 37
- Main character(s): Duke; Flint; Roadblock; Scarlett; Shipwreck; Snake Eyes; Stalker; Storm Shadow

Creative team
- Written by: Joe Casey; Mark Powers; Mike O'Sullivan
- Penciller(s): Stefano Caselli; Nelson Blake; Josh Medors; Mike Bear; Mike Shoyket
- Inker(s): Andrew Pepoy; Stefano Caselli; John Lowe; Richard Zajac; Clayton Brown; Mike Bear; Mike Shoyket

G.I. Joe: America's Elite is a series of comic books set in the G.I. Joe universe which began publication in June 2005. The events of the series begin one year after the conclusion of G.I. Joe: A Real American Hero (vol. 2), and features the G.I. Joe Team re-activated with a reduced roster. The Special Missions series features reserve specialists who are activated as needed, and expands on plots set up in the main title.

== Plot synopsis ==
One year after the previous series, satellites begin falling out of orbit and crashing into major cities, resulting in massive civilian casualties. The G.I. Joe Team, deactivated at the end of the previous series, is reactivated to deal with the new threat. Led by General Joseph Colton, the core roster initially consists of Duke, Flint, Roadblock, Scarlett, Shipwreck, Snake Eyes, Stalker and Storm Shadow. Their new headquarters is in Yellowstone National Park and is code named "The Rock".

Thinking that Cobra is responsible for the attacks, General Colton, Duke and Storm Shadow interrogate the Baroness, who is being held in a classified sub-level of The Rock. Duke, Scarlett and Snake Eyes all leave to conduct solo investigations, while the rest of the team follows a lead to Puerto Rico. They discover the attacks were made possible by Destro's M.A.R.S. operation, and call in Firewall to help retrofit the VLA in New Mexico, in order to counter the tractor beam that is pulling the satellites out of orbit. Despite an attack by Iron Grenadier robots, the G.I. Joe team tracks the signal to Oregon, and discovers that a man named Vance Wingfield, who once attempted to start a nuclear war and was presumed dead, is behind the attacks.

Snake Eyes returns, to find that Scarlett has been captured while investigating Cesspool. Unable to authorize a rescue mission for Scarlett, General Colton puts the team on leave from active duty. They discover Scarlett on Destro's submarine in the Pacific Ocean, and succeed in rescuing her, but Destro escapes and Snake Eyes dies during the operation. General Colton meets the team at a U.S. Naval base in Kyushu, Japan, where Kamakura arrives to discover that Snake Eyes' body is missing. The Joes investigate information on all Cobra enclaves, in order to recover Snake Eyes. Storm Shadow confronts Major Bludd in Australia, and the team encounters a Cobra enclave in Canada. Meanwhile, the Red Ninja Clan, under the control of Sei-Tin, has stolen Snake Eyes' body in order to resurrect him. The Joes track the Red Ninjas to China, where Sei-Tin takes control of Snake Eyes, and uses him to exact his revenge against Storm Shadow and Kamakura. They eventually defeat Sei-Tin and return Snake Eyes to normal.

Snake Eyes renounces his ninja background and returns to his "commando" persona. Flint leaves the team. General Colton confronts Hawk to find out where Duke has been. He sends the Joes to Peru, where they take out a Cobra cell and rescue Spirit, who had also been working on a classified mission for Hawk. Meanwhile, Cobra Commander, who has been rebuilding his forces since the end of the previous series, infiltrates the U.S. government by disguising himself as White House Chief of Staff Garrett Freelowe. He tries to convince the President to shut down the G.I. Joe team. When he fails, he creates a new team called the Phoenix Guard led by General Philip Rey, a former G.I. Joe commander, and consisting of Friday (Zarana), Halo (Wild Weasel), High Tide (Copperhead), Mech (Scrap-Iron), and Snake-Eater (Firefly). They initially upstage G.I. Joe, by beating them to a Cobra base in Utah, before the government sends them to take over The Rock and displace the G.I. Joe team. Before they arrive, Storm Shadow leaves for parts unknown, but the Phoenix Guard infiltrates The Rock, and manages to capture Roadblock, Shipwreck, Stalker and Hawk. The remaining Joes fight off the attack, as Duke finally returns, and General Rey discovers the true identities of the Phoenix Guard members. G.I. Joe finally captures most of the Phoenix Guard, but the Baroness escapes during the fight, and after the failed attack on G.I. Joe headquarters, Cobra Commander abandons the White House.

General Rey goes on a sabbatical following the invasion of The Rock, to fill in some of the holes in his memory. Duke accompanies General Rey, because he does not trust his intentions. During the sabbatical, General Rey and Duke discover that Zandar was involved, and travel to the Florida Everglades. They learn that one of Zandar's aliases was hired to broker a deal between The Coil and a group of Army generals known as "The Jugglers". This leads them to General Rey's psychiatrist Dr. Scott Stevens, who reveals that General Rey is a clone of Serpentor. Dr. Stevens is then revealed to be Cobra hypnotist Crystal Ball, who has brainwashed General Rey, and commands him to kill Duke. General Rey breaks free from Crystal Ball's control with Duke's help.

Meanwhile, the Baroness pursues her campaign of revenge against her betrayers, Cobra Commander and Wraith. During her quest, she locates and horribly disfigures the Cobra surgeon Scalpel, in order to find Wraith's location. She also enlists the aid of Major Bludd. While the Joes find Scalpel barely alive, the Baroness finds Wraith in a club in Prague, and lures him into a cemetery where she confronts and defeats him, shooting him in the head. She trades his armor to the Red Shadows in exchange for information on the whereabouts of Cobra Commander. Flint, who is tracking Red Shadows' leader Wilder Vaughn, spots the Baroness with Vaughn and alerts G.I. Joe. Hoping to throw the G.I. Joe team off the Baroness' trail, Major Bludd raids an oil refinery in Saudi Arabia, but he is captured by the Joes. The Baroness locates the Commander in Honduras, but finds that Destro, her husband, is also present. Spirit and Snake Eyes also track Flint to the Baroness' location, where the three of them are attacked by Black Out. After a brief fight, Destro agrees to trade the M.A.R.S. corporation, his Iron Grenadier forces, and his eldest son Alexander to Cobra Commander, in exchange for his and the Baroness' baby. Cobra Commander also avoids capture, by revealing that he possesses the personal information of every G.I. Joe agent, because of his time working in the White House.

=== World War III ===
G.I. Joe counters by going on the offensive, launching missions to capture Cobra agents still at large. To spread chaos and violence, Cobra Commander sells M.A.R.S. weaponry to insurgents, terrorists, and rebel groups. In response, the entire G.I. Joe roster is mobilized, and the team deploys its armed forces around the world. G.I. Joe is warned of a coming "World War III" by Agent Delta, an undercover operative who joined Cobra before the organization's rise. Agent Delta contacts G.I. Joe after Cobra tells him to assassinate the Israeli Prime Minister. G.I. Joe manages to stop the assassination attempt, but discovers that it was a set-up.

As part of Cobra Commander's sinister plot, Cobra sniper Black Out sneaks on board a Russian submarine and launches missiles at Boston. America declares a state of war. Cobra then attacks Washington, D.C., and Cobra Commander assumes control. He sends the elite squadron known as The Plague to attack G.I. Joe headquarters. Cobra bombs Russia, claiming retaliation for the missile attack on Boston, and seizes control of U.S. military installations. In Israel, the evenly matched Plague and G.I. Joe teams clash. As Alexander attacks England and France, Cobra sleeper cells attack government buildings in nations across the globe.

Storm Shadow returns to stop Cobra from liberating prisoners from the G.I. Joe prison facility "The Coffin". He is partially successful, but Tomax manages to free Major Bludd and several others, while killing those Cobra Commander considered "loose ends". Storm Shadow then tracks down Destro and the Baroness, so that they can help disable Cobra's M.A.R.S. tech devices. They join the rest of the main team, in defeating several Cobra cells, and disarming nuclear weapons that Cobra Commander has placed in the Amazon and Antarctica.

Cobra Commander and The Plague retreat to a secret base in the Appalachian Mountains, where the final battle takes place. The series ends with G.I. Joe forces defeating and apprehending Cobra Commander, by taking control of the M.A.R.S. satellite systems (with aid from Destro). In the aftermath, the Joes are still active and fully funded. Destro turns himself in. Major Bludd and several Cobra agents are back in The Coffin. And Cobra Commander is locked away in a special underwater prison.

== Spin-offs ==
=== G.I. Joe: Special Missions ===
A series of one-shots featuring reservist members of G.I. Joe, and set in different parts of the world.

- Manhattan (February 2006): This one-shot features G.I. Joe reservists Beach Head, Cover Girl, Mercer, Low-Light, and Tunnel Rat on a special mission involving a bio-weapon threat in New York City. Also included is a side story about G.I. Joe reservist Barrel Roll and his brother, Cobra operative Black Out.
- Tokyo (September 2006): This one-shot features the ninja Jinx and samurai Budo, with reservists Wild Bill, Gung Ho, Clutch, and Rock 'n Roll. The team tries to prevent a coup in Japan.
- Antarctica (December 2006): This one-shot features Scarlett, Snake Eyes, Stalker, and Duke as well as reservists Snow Job, Frostbite, and Iceberg. Also included is a brief Hawaiian interlude, which reveals the whereabouts of several long-missing Cobra agents.
- Brazil (April 2007): This one-shot features Mainframe, Leatherneck, Claymore, Dial Tone, and Wet Suit during a mission in Brazil in the 1980s, against Headman, a drug kingpin. It then shifts to the present, where the team reunites (with Firewall replacing Mainframe who was killed in action) to take down the Headman once and for all. Also included is a side story showing Shipwreck and Cover Girl saving a Brazilian senator, with flashbacks to various parts of their relationship.
- The Enemy (September 2007): This one shot features a parallel story of G.I. Joe Infantry Squad Leader Robert "Grunt" Graves in the upper panels, as he joins the army and G.I. Joe, and a man joining Cobra in the lower panels, and how their lives and experiences differed. Also included is a side story showing Black Out and an Eel codenamed Guillotine, conducting a mission with several Cobra agents, and reporting to Cobra Commander. The mission is revealed to be a recruitment operation for The Plague.

=== Declassified ===
The various Declassified series and one-shots explore the origins of the characters, and are set before #1 of Marvel's G.I. Joe series.

- Snake Eyes Declassified – A six-issue limited series written by Brandon Jerwa, and set before issue #1 of the original Marvel Comics series, retelling and expanding the story of Snake Eyes.
- Scarlett Declassified – A double-sized one-shot issue, telling the history of the character code-named Scarlett (Shana O'Hara), set between Snake Eyes Declassified and G.I. Joe Declassified.
- G.I. Joe: Declassified – A limited series of three double-sized issues written by Larry Hama, released bi-monthly beginning in June 2006. The story is set between Scarlett Declassified and issue #1 of the original Marvel Comics series, telling the first missions of the original thirteen members of the team.
- Dreadnoks Declassified – A limited series of three double-sized issues written by Josh Blaylock, telling the complete origin story of Zartan, including how he gained his abilities.

=== Storm Shadow ===
Storm Shadow was a comic book series published by Devil's Due Publishing in 2007. Scripted by Larry Hama, it centered on the exploits of Storm Shadow, traveling the world as a freelance operative, after leaving the G.I. Joe team in G.I. Joe: America's Elite #15.

The series began publication in May 2007, and was intended to be an ongoing series, but was canceled after seven issues in December 2007 at the request of Hasbro. It was notable for being the third G.I. Joe comic to have Hama as a writer since the original Marvel Comics run (the first being G.I. Joe: Frontline, and the second being G.I. Joe: Declassified).

=== Data Desk Handbook ===
This one-shot published files for America's Elite's main characters. The files are presented as computer entries written by Commanding Officer General Joseph R. Colton (the original G.I. Joe). Several other files were later published in individual issues of America's Elite, Special Missions, and trade paper back volumes. A two-issue version of the title was published in late 2007, with updated Data Desk Files.

=== The Hunt for Cobra Commander ===
This one-shot issue is set in the year between the Devil's Due A Real American Hero series and America's Elite series, and featured G.I. Joe team member Spirit tracking Cobra Commander. The issue is largely told via e-mails Spirit sends Hawk while on the mission.

== Collected editions ==
Title (Trade Paperback)	Material collected	Publication date	ISBN
G.I. Joe: America's Elite Disavowed Volume 1	G.I. Joe: America's Elite #0-6	2013	978-1613777046
G.I. Joe America's Elite: Disavowed Volume 2	G.I. Joe: America's Elite #7-12	2013	978-1613778272
G.I. Joe America's Elite: Disavowed, Volume 3	G.I. Joe: America's Elite #13-18	2014	978-1613779309
G.I. Joe America's Elite: Disavowed Volume 4	G.I. Joe: America's Elite #19-24	2014	978-1631400780
G.I. Joe America's Elite: Disavowed Volume 5	G.I. Joe: America's Elite #25-30	2014	978-1631401701
G.I. Joe America's Elite: Disavowed Volume 6	G.I. Joe: America's Elite #31-36	2015	978-1631403200
G.I. Joe: A Real American Hero - Special Missions	G.I. Joe: Special Missions #1-6	2007	978-1932796827
G.I. Joe: Snake Eyes: Declassified	Snake Eyes: Declassified #1-6	2007	978-1932796728
G.I. Joe: Declassified	G.I. Joe: Declassified #1-3	2007	978-1932796742
G.I. Joe - Dreadnoks: Declassified	Dreadnoks: Declassified #1-3	2007	978-1932796841
