= Shipwreck (G.I. Joe) =

Character from the G.I. Joe franchise

- G.I. Joe character
- Original Hasbro card art
- First appearance: G.I. Joe: A Real American Hero issue #40 (October 1985)
- Voiced by: Neil Ross (Sunbow/Marvel); Carlos Alazraqui (Renegades); Mark Oliver (G.I. Joe: Operation Blackout)

In-universe information
- Affiliation: G.I. Joe
- Specialty: Sailor (1985-1994); Navy SEAL (1994-present)
- File name: Delgado, Hector X.
- Birth place: Chula Vista, CA
- SN: 924-92-5456
- Rank: E-7 (Chief Petty Officer) (1985); E-8 (Senior Chief Petty Officer)
- Primary MOS: Gunners Mate
- Secondary MOS: Machinist

Shipwreck is a fictional character from the G.I. Joe: A Real American Hero series of toys, animated series and comics. He was originally created as a character for the Sunbow/Marvel animated series in 1984, later produced as an action figure, and finally introduced into the comic book in 1985.

== Profile ==
His real name is Hector X. Delgado, and he was born in Chula Vista, California and is of Hispanic ancestry. Shipwreck grew up near the San Diego Navy Yards and enlisted in the Navy at sixteen after getting permission from his parents. In the two-part Sunbow episode "There's No Place Like Springfield", he revealed he lied about being the minimum age of seventeen in order to join.

Shipwreck graduated from the Great Lakes Naval Gunnery School, and is a qualified expert with the M-14, M-16, Browning .50 cal., 20mm Oerlikon AA gun, and the M1911A1 Auto Pistol. He served time at Gitmo before moving on to carrier operations in the Middle East, and participating in patrolling actions in the Mekong Delta and Yokosuka.

Shipwreck dislikes the use of "gadgets" in war. "See the target, shoot the target" is his philosophy.

It has been speculated that his appearance was based on that of George Harrison, although his voice in the cartoon and the fact that he is a naval seaman indicates that he is based on Jack Nicholson's character from the film The Last Detail. He has a pet parrot named Polly (voiced by Frank Welker and Neil Ross), who is his loyal companion and is usually seen sitting on his shoulder or helping out with the G.I. Joe Team on some of their missions; in the series Polly would often repeat commands, as well as nautical terms. On rare occasions, he even proved capable of holding brief but meaningful conversations with human beings (as when, in one episode, he initially refused to divulge Shipwreck's whereabouts to the other Joes), indicating far greater intelligence than a typical parrot. Polly also learned sailing songs from Shipwreck and was prone to including Shipwreck's name in them, to the latter's embarrassment; Polly customarily addresses Shipwreck simply as "Sailor". Because of Polly's irritating behavior, Shipwreck would sometimes leave him back home while away on missions; in a dream sequence Polly dreams about being the leader of the P.E.T.S. (Primal Emergency Tactical Squad), which is a sub-team of G.I. Joe composed of all the Joe's pets. In the dream, they save Shipwreck from Crystal Ball.

== Action figures ==
Shipwreck first appeared in the 1985 edition of the G.I. Joe: A Real American Hero toy series as the G.I. Joe sailor, with his parrot, Polly. In 1994, he was repackaged as a Navy SEAL and received an action figure update. He also had a 12" edition figure produced as part of the G.I. Joe vs. Cobra line. Though Shipwreck did not appear in the G.I. Joe: Sigma Six TV series, a figure in his likeness was released under the name.

== Comics ==
=== Marvel Comics ===
Shipwreck's first appearance was in issue #40 (October 1985) of Marvel Comics' G.I. Joe: A Real American Hero series, alongside Barbecue. This concerns the testing of a mobile weapons platform.

He then helps the Joes deal with the aquatic effects of the creation of Cobra Island, namely a tidal wave. The Joes make a preemptive attack on the island but are ordered off before anything definite happens. During the Joes' nighttime invasion of the Cobra-controlled town of Springfield, Shipwreck is part of Hawk's strike team, which is sent to take control of the airport. When Cobra's subsequent attempt to retake the airport turns out to be a feint, Shipwreck fires a white phosphoorus shell skyward to reveal Cobra transport helicopters have already evacuated the town, leaving the Joes virtually empty-handed. In issue #51, he and Alpine are part of a squad sent out to stop Zartan's escape attempt. The two team up to stop a Dreadnok "Swamp-Copter"; Alpine launches a hooked rope at it and Shipwreck ties it to a nearby tank. This works, gaining them temporary custody of Zarana and her brother Zandar. A spray of gunfire from the Thunder Machine sends Shipwreck diving for his life and the prisoners escape. Shipwreck has a cameo in the fourth issue of the G.I. Joe Yearbook series as part of a Joe team spying on Cobra Island. This involves a confrontation with the Oktober Guard.

During the Cobra Civil War, Shipwreck is teamed with Cutter and pilots a W.H.A.L.E. hovercraft. He assists in a battle against the Oktober Guard during the escape of a Russian defector. He assists other Joes in the secret construction of The Pit II.

=== Action Force ===
The Marvel UK 'Action Force' comics maintained a different G.I. Joe continuity. Shipwreck is featured in these stories, starting with issue one. He later helps raid a Crimson Guard outpost. He assists in preventing Cobra from gaining control of the criminal syndicates of Venice, Italy.

=== Devil's Due ===
Shipwreck in his later uniform.

Devil's Due Publishing introduced Shipwreck in a storyline based on his later filecards when he trained to become a Navy SEAL. The first issue of the G.I. Joe: Battle Files makes mention on his activities between the disbandment and reinstatement of the Joe Team. He was running tour guide operations and busting pirates and drug smugglers in between.

Shipwreck is one of the first Joes called back to active duty, and is one of the few Joes unaffected by Cobra's nanite-based weapons. As such, he is one of the many on-foot military defenders on the White House lawn; they are there to stop a Cobra takeover. Despite losses, including Greenshirts, Cobra is defeated.

The Joe Team would be disbanded once more and reformed with a smaller core group in the series, G.I. Joe: America’s Elite. Shipwreck is included in the new team and is one of the more vocal critics for including Storm Shadow in the lineup. In America's Elite, Shipwreck's appearance changes. Originally, he has unkempt red-brown hair and a slender build. Some time after issue 12, he appears stockier and with black hair and a neatly trimmed beard (however, in real life, U.S. Navy personnel are not permitted to grow facial hair because such hair could potentially diminish the effectiveness of emergency underwater breathing apparatus).

== Animated series ==
=== Sunbow ===
Shipwreck also appeared in G.I. Joe animated series from Sunbow and Marvel voiced by Neil Ross while Polly's vocal effects are provided by Ross or by Frank Welker, depending on the episode. He is one of the more fleshed out characters in the series.

He first appeared in the 1984 miniseries, "The Revenge of Cobra", as offering Flint and Mutt a way back to Joe headquarters on his land sail. The Joe Team offered Shipwreck a spot on the membership roster which he gladly accepted. Shipwreck then played a major role in a subplot in the "Pyramid of Darkness" mini-series. He and Snake Eyes infiltrate a Cobra underwater factory and steal a laser disc containing information on the cubes to the pyramid of darkness. They fight their way out of the stronghold, and are later rescued through the efforts of a popular lounge singer named Satin, whom Shipwreck falls in love with. In the climax of the story arc, during the battle at Cobra Temple, Shipwreck activates a mechanism that causes the cubes to self-destruct. When Cobra Commander and Tomax and Xamot make a final attempt to flee via rocket ship, Shipwreck, Snake Eyes and Satin try to stop them, before escaping so that the Joes could destroy the rocket.

Shipwreck continued to be a recurring character through the regular series and generally served as comic relief. He has a pet parrot named Polly that he pretends to despise. The bird is capable of dozens of phrases; they often relate to the action. On missions, Shipwreck was often paired off with Cover Girl. Occasionally, Shipwreck would bend rules or engage in mischief. For example, in "Twenty Questions", while serving as an escort for Hector Ramirez and his news crew, he takes them to a Cobra operation in the Rockies in secret, in order to prove that Cobra exists; in "Lights! Camera! Cobra!", he is one of the Joes hired as technical advisors on a movie about G.I. Joe, but tricks the film crew into letting him go sightseeing in Hollywood instead, resulting in him getting into a fight at a pool hall and arrested. Shipwreck also tends to flirt with the female Joe members, especially Cover Girl.

Shipwreck was among the number of Joes whose relatives were captured and brainwashed by Cobra in "Captives of Cobra". In the same episode, Shipwreck tells his adopted nephew that he himself was also adopted and they are both lucky to have such loving families. "Memories of Mara" found Shipwreck in love with an escaped Cobra agent named Mara, who was part of an experimental procedure to create amphibious soldiers who could breathe on land and in water. However, the experiment was only partially successful with Mara, who could no longer breathe out of water for more than a few minutes.

In the highly rated two-part season finale "There's No Place Like Springfield", Shipwreck and Lady Jaye rescue Professor Mullaney from Cobra. The scientist informs them of a formula he has been working on and a missing ingredient that will complete it. As a backup plan, Mullaney implants the formula into Shipwreck's brain via a neural transceiver (as seen in Star Trek) and reveals he is only able to remember it by hearing a code word, which he tells Lady Jaye. A following battle leaves Shipwreck unconscious from sinking in water. Upon waking up (purportedly) six years later, his emotions and mental state would be toyed with when he is trapped in a town filled with synthoid copies of his friends and loved ones, including Mara and another synthoid called Althea, who was posing as his daughter from his false marriage to Mara. During the two-parter, Shipwreck is tormented by a recurring nightmare of Cobra interrogating him for Mullaney's formula, as well as visions of many of his long-term Joe friends. He would perceive them as normal, then they would melt away in front of him. In Part 2 of the episode, Shipwreck's origins are revealed when a female Crimson Guard named Cadet Deming interrogates him, by using a hazardous psychedelic mind control program, a reference to the 1975 film Inside Out. After discovering he has not aged, Shipwreck realizes his surroundings are not what they seem. He additionally learns about the synthoids and discovers he is actually in a secret Cobra base. In a laboratory, he finds Mullaney's work. Polly helps him recall the formula and he creates it with the secret ingredient. Shipwreck pours the formula down the drain before Cobra can obtain it. Gunfire from the Dreadnoks ignites the formula, causing explosions that signal the USS Flagg and lead the Joes to rescue Shipwreck. Shipwreck goes to save his supposed wife and child and is devastated upon the revelation that they are synthoids.

The second season finds Shipwreck appearing less but still managing to participate in major roles in episodes he does appear in. Shipwreck is featured in the episode "Once Upon a Joe", as he entertains orphans with a fairy tale of his own while their home is being rebuilt. This season portrays Shipwreck as apparently less serious and capable than he was in the previous. In the aforementioned episode, he tries to ignore his order to report for duty, shoots down a Cobra jet that crashes into an orphanage, and manages to avoid rebuilding the home with the Joes by purposely acting clumsily and prompting the others to kick him out, though he later saves the Joes in battle using the MacGuffin device. In "The Most Dangerous Thing in the World", Cobra sends false orders through the Department of Defense computers promoting Shipwreck, Dial Tone and Lifeline to Colonel. Shipwreck arrogantly assumes his position and even deploys live ammunition for an armor drill, leading to an accident that almost kills Leatherneck and Wet-Suit. His aggressiveness and ineptitude, combined with disagreement on battle tactics and poor leadership among the "Colonels", throws the Joe team into chaos. When Cobra attacks Joe headquarters, Shipwreck misuses the base's particle beam gun, which causes it to crash into the base, burying him in the wreckage. General Hawk later comments that Shipwreck has neither the desire nor the ability to be an officer.

Shipwreck also appears in two of the series' Public Service Announcements. In the first, he talks a couple of kids out of stealing a bike by showing them how wrong it is. In the second, he talks a boy out of running away from home following an argument with his parents, suggesting that he solve his problems by talking to his parents.

==== G.I. Joe: The Movie ====
Shipwreck also appeared briefly in the 1987 animated film G.I. Joe: The Movie, as a part of a Joe unit led by Roadblock that is captured by Cobra-La.

=== Spy Troops and Valor vs. Venom ===
Shipwreck appeared in the direct-to-video CGI animated movies G.I. Joe: Spy Troops and G.I. Joe: Valor vs. Venom, voiced by Lee Tockar.

=== Resolute ===
Shipwreck also has a small cameo in the 2009 animated film, G.I. Joe: Resolute. He is seen on the flagship amongst many other Joes, yet without dialogue.

=== Renegades ===
Shipwreck appeared in the G.I. Joe: Renegades episode "Shipwrecked", portrayed as Latin American and voiced by Carlos Alazraqui. Hector Delgado was a ship captain for Cobra, until Cobra had his ship sunk when he would not do some dumping at sea on their behalf, and blamed him for his own ship sinking. G.I. Joe has to trade the "Coyote" in order to carry them on their ship to Washington, DC. During the cruise to Washington, G.I. Joe's package gets loose, unleashing an energy-draining Techno-Viper that drains the electricity from Shipwreck's ship. Shipwreck helps G.I. Joe when it comes to stopping the Techno-Viper before it reaches a heavily populated area. Shipwreck and G.I. Joe have no choice but to sink the ship. G.I. Joe had to use the fire extinguishers in order to take down the Techno-Viper. Shipwreck still was not willing to lose his ship, causing Roadblock to drive the "Coyote" that the Techno-Viper was on into the water. Shipwreck's ship managed to catch the "Coyote", and gives Roadblock the "Coyote" back. Shipwreck joins up with G.I. Joe, when the Techno-Viper's signal is traced to Scotland, as Shipwreck still has a score to settle with Cobra Industries.

== Video games ==
Shipwreck appears as a playable character in the video game G.I. Joe: The Rise of Cobra.

== Other media ==
- Shipwreck appears in the Robot Chicken episode "Toy Meets Girl", voiced by Breckin Meyer. In the "Where Are They Now" segment, Shipwreck is kidnapped for food by a Chinese restaurant chef. Seth Green later voiced Shipwreck in the episode "More Blood, More Chocolate". In the "Inside the Battlefield: The Weather Dominator" segment, Shipwreck participated in the North Pole hockey tournament against some Cobra soldiers. In "PS: Yes In That Way", Shipwreck is among the G.I. Joe members that makes fun of the new recruit Calvin (who had been nicknamed "Fumbles"). Shipwreck and his parrot Polly are later sniped by Calvin. In "The Ramblings of Maurice", he is with the G.I. Joe team when Roadblock is rewarded for his services. Shipwreck was present at Junkyard's funeral.
- A modified 1994 Shipwreck action figure was used in the live-action Nickelodeon TV series Action League Now!. The figure was depicted as "Stinky Diver" as described in the show's intro as "a former navy commando with an attitude as bad as his odor".
- In The Venture Bros. episode "The Invisible Hand of Fate", a parody of Shipwreck exists named Shore Leave. A member of a G.I. Joe-like organization, Shore Leave is noticeably effeminate. His costume resembles the nautical outfit worn in the Village People music video, "In the Navy". This parody is much more violent than his cartoon counterpart.
- Shipwreck is mentioned in the comedic non-fiction novel "Our Wife" in the context of which action figure is paired with the female toys.
- The character's toy is talked about in the non-fiction book about cartoons; "Saturday Morning Fever".
- Shipwreck meets his death in a young boy's imaginings on page 148 of the e-book Diary of an American Boy: A Poet, Athlete, Stud, and a Liar by Charles Pratt.
- His dress sense is mentioned on page 172 of the non-fiction paperback "Saturday Morning Fever".
- Buzz Dixon once suggested that Shipwreck should appear in My Little Pony: The Movie, however in this suggestion he was implied to be drunk and he would smash his bottle, take off his cap and start doing what was implied to be praying as soon as he saw the ponies and this part was ultimately rejected by Hasbro.
