= Baroness (G.I. Joe) =

Fictional character from the G.I. Joe franchise

- G.I. Joe character
- Image of Baroness from the original G.I. Joe: A Real American Hero toyline
- First appearance: 1982
- Portrayed by: Sienna Miller (G.I. Joe: The Rise of Cobra); Úrsula Corberó (Snake Eyes)
- Voiced by: Morgan Lofting (Sunbow & DIC series); Teryl Rothery (Spy Troops & Valor vs. Venom); Bella Hudson/Kayzie Rogers (Sigma 6); Grey DeLisle (Resolute & The Rise of Cobra video game); Tatyana Yassukovich (Renegades); Misty Lee (G.I. Joe: Operation Blackout); Marianna Black (Smite)

In-universe information
- Affiliation: Cobra
- File name: Anastasia Cisarovna a.k.a. Anastasia DeCobray
- SN: 0501–AD
- Primary MOS: Intelligence
- Secondary MOS: Fixed-wing pilot

Baroness is a fictional character from the G.I. Joe: A Real American Hero toyline by Hasbro, originally appearing in the first issue of the G.I. Joe: A Real American Hero comic series by Marvel Comics in June, 1982. The Baroness is a villainess, associated with the G.I. Joe Team's nemesis, Cobra.

As chief intelligence officer of Cobra and a top lieutenant to Cobra Commander, the Baroness is a dark, sensual femme fatale whose beauty is matched only by her ruthlessness, cunning, and absolute loyalty to Cobra. She is often portrayed as being romantically involved with Destro.

She was adapted into the 1985 animated TV series and the toy line. She made her debut as an action figure in the 1984 series, wearing a new uniform that was then carried back over to the comic and cartoon. The character was portrayed by actress Sienna Miller in the 2009 film G.I. Joe: The Rise of Cobra. She is portrayed by Úrsula Corberó in the 2021 film Snake Eyes.

== Profile ==
The spoiled offspring of European aristocrats, Anastasia Cisarovna was first involved in student radicalism, dabbled in extremist fringe groups, and finally graduated to international terrorism. She is believed to have been trained as a spy and saboteur at an exclusive facility run by a former Warsaw Pact intelligence agency.

Officially the head of Cobra intelligence operations, the Baroness is a world-class expert in cryptography and psychological warfare. She has extensive knowledge of bio-chemical agents and is often shown to be exceptionally talented at disguises. She also has old ties and loyalties to Destro and is the only one who knows his true identity.

The Baroness has had extensive plastic surgery after suffering severe burns during a Cobra night-attack operation. She is full of contradictions: cynical yet romantic, calculating but naive, blunt and prone to beating around the bush. She is a qualified expert with weapons such as the M-16, AK-47, RPG7, and Uzi, and is a qualified H.I.S.S. tank operator with proficiency in operating helicopters and fixed-wing aircraft of varying types.

== Toys ==
The Baroness was introduced into the toyline in 1984, wearing her trademark black leather outfit. After the line was canceled in 1994, Hasbro made several attempts to revive G.I. Joe action figures through repaints. In 1997, the original mold was repainted in blue, for inclusion in the Cobra Command Team 3-pack. In 2000, the mold was repainted again, in black with red accents, as the new character "Chameleon" (a Baroness doppelganger created to sidestep a trademark problem).

In 2002, Hasbro relaunched the "Real American Hero" line, and a new version of the Baroness was released in the third wave of figures, wearing a uniform heavily inspired by the original action figure. A second Baroness figure was released in 2004, for the "Valor vs Venom" line. Once again wearing a blue uniform, this figure was better-proportioned, and was even more closely based on the 1984 figure. This mold was repainted in black, and released again in 2005.

=== 25th anniversary ===
2007 is the Anniversary of the launch of G.I. Joe: A Real American Hero, the third major reinvention of the G.I. Joe brand since 1964. To celebrate, Hasbro created two boxed sets of brand new figures, featuring modern sculpt and updated and increased articulation (including the replacement of G.I. Joe's trademark O-Ring construction). The Baroness is included in the Cobra set, along with Cobra Commander, Destro, Storm Shadow, and a Cobra Trooper. Another version with a new head sculpt was released in 2008. This version of the Baroness was made to resemble her appearance in "The M.A.S.S. Device."

== Comic books ==
=== Early history ===
The Baroness is the daughter of wealthy European aristocrats. She spends years decrying the hypocrisy of the American government, becoming an active participant in militant revolutionary groups, eventually becoming a member of Cobra.

=== Marvel Comics ===
The Baroness first appeared in the Marvel Comics series G.I. Joe: A Real American Hero #1. She is instrumental in Cobra's first major offensive against G.I. Joe, Operation: Lady Doomsday. Posing as a reporter, Baroness abducts Dr. Adele Burkhart and brings her back to Cobra's island fortress. Despite disguising herself as the Doctor, the Joes rescue the correct one and destroy the fortress. Baroness and Cobra Commander escape.

When the Cobra Commander first contracts Destro to salvage a mission in Alaska, the Baroness reveals that she has a past association with the masked man, but declines to give details.

Evading the G.I. Joe assault, the Baroness and Scar-Face escape in a plane, but the Baroness cannot pass up the opportunity to blow up the small island where Snake Eyes, Kwinn the Eskimo, and Doctor Venom are locked in battle. Just before the bombs hit, Kwinn pushes the other two into the island bunker.

Baroness and Cobra Commander discover that Dr. Venom has left out a vital part of the toxin and the microdot points the Joes to the Springfield HQ. This was according to Destro's plan; Scar-Face is working for him. Destro had not realized the Baroness was with the Commander, and stages a successful diversionary mission.

Cobra Commander's ally Major Bludd looks for a chance to kill Destro. This comes during a tank battle; Baroness sacrifices herself to save Destro. Bludd has a chance to free her, but flees leaving her to an explosion.

Seemingly killed in the fight, the Baroness is in fact rescued after the battle, and brought to Bethesda Naval Hospital, where she lays severely burned and in a coma. When the Joe Grand Slam takes Major Bludd into custody, the Baroness is moved to G.I. Joe headquarters in Staten Island as well. Luring Cobra into attacking the base after they capture Scar-Face in Tripoli, Libya the Joes instigate a major skirmish at their own headquarters. During the battle, Major Bludd kills General Flagg. Taking the Baroness, he leaves Scar-Face for dead, and escapes in a Cobra F.A.N.G.

==== Battle of Springfield ====
Not long after, G.I. Joe is given the location of the real Springfield and attacks. The Baroness assists Destro in evacuating the town. During the battle, Doctor Mindbender's latest experiment is conducted, and Serpentor is created. Thought dead, Storm Shadow is also "resurrected" in Springfield and flees the G.I. Joe attack with the Dreadnoks. Destro manages to successfully evacuate the entire town as Serpentor fights a holding action. Although the Baroness suggests they leave, and garner all the glory themselves, Destro chooses to extract Serpentor and his forces.

Upon reaching Cobra Island, Serpentor begins his usurping of the Commander's leadership, and the Baroness is quick to take up with him, seeing the reins of power being passed. When the Commander and Destro are buried alive under Pit II. The Baroness flies a Rattler over the rubble, and drops a wreath to mourn the passing of her estranged lover.

For a time, the Baroness allies herself wholly to Serpentor, and is in charge of the Terror Drome operation in Sierra Gordo when G.I. Joe agent Flint is captured and brought into the base. When Dr. Mindbender subjects him to the Brainwave Scanner, and gets no facial reactions, he suspects that the Joe is wearing a mask. Pulling it off, the Baroness confirms the identity of the massively scarred face beneath: it is actually Snake Eyes in disguise. As G.I. Joe attacks the Terror Drome, Snake Eyes is moved, along with the Scanner, to Cobra's new Consulate Building in New York.

As he is subjected to the Scanner again, the consulate is attacked by Scarlett and Storm Shadow, eager to rescue their ally. Disguised as a late-night cleaning lady, Scarlett infiltrates the consulate, while Snake Eyes' ninja brother breaks into the building using the New York City sewer system. Using an X-ray scanner, the Baroness confronts Scarlett, but she is surprised when Snake Eyes' wolf, Timber, leaps out at her. While Storm Shadow rescues Snake Eyes upstairs, Scarlett overpowers the Baroness, strips her of her uniform and leaves her bound and gagged in a nearby closet. Fighting their way to the lobby, Snake Eyes and Storm Shadow are then "recaptured" by Scarlett, disguised as the Baroness, and all three escape through the main entrance of the consulate.

Later, the G.I. Joe team causes a massive disruption of the Consulate in a successful bid to place a wire tap on the building. Defeated, the Baroness is recalled to Cobra Island where a schism has occurred in the leadership of Cobra: Cobra Commander has returned. With the Baroness able to identify the Commander's real face, she is put in a transport chopper with him, and removes his helmet. Underneath is not the Commander, but one of the Crimson Guardsmen, Fred VII. Claiming that the Commander retired to be with his son Billy (a lie, Fred actually shot and buried the Commander in Denver), the Baroness goes along with the false Commander, and usurps control of Cobra from an embarrassed and unpopular Serpentor.

Now in de facto command of Cobra, the Baroness is forced to take Fred VII on a mission into orbit to destroy a spy satellite threatening to undo Serpentor's Terrodrome plot. When the Cobra Shuttle is attacked by the G.I. Joe Defiant, Baroness is knocked unconscious, leaving Fred VII to lead Cobra to a slim victory. Now cocky and drunk with power, Fred drags the Baroness' reputation down with him, as he ham-handedly leads Cobra to defeat in Frusenland, where Battleforce 2000 discovers the truth about the Terror Dromes, despite Baroness' best efforts to defeat them.

==== Cobra Civil War ====
Returning to Cobra Island, the Baroness is in attendance as Serpentor's lackey, the Star-Viper returns from a mission to infiltrate G.I. Joe's new base, Pit III, in Utah. Looking for a clear victory to win support back from the troops, the ceremony turns into a battle of words that erupts in the Cobra Civil War. As the leader of the first offensive, the Baroness is taken prisoner by Serpentor, and strapped to the front of his HISS tank to deter anyone from firing on him.

Into this all-encompassing war, the G.I. Joe team arrives to bolster Serpentor's ranks, while Destro makes an appearance with his own faction: the Iron Grenadiers. While G.I. Joe, Serpentor, and the "Commander" tear each other apart, Destro takes the airfield, and waits for his opportunity. Just as Fred's army seems lost, Zartan fires an arrow and slays Serpentor from across the battlefield. With his leader fallen, Mindbender calls for a truce with the "Commander." United against Destro, the reunified Cobra is surprised to find that Destro wants only one thing: the Baroness.

Taking his prize, Destro retreats to his yacht. She reveals the true identity of the current Commander, and together they bear witness to G.I. Joe's unceremonious withdrawal from the Island. After helping the Joes clear their reputation in the wake of the Civil War, Destro and Baroness retire to Castle Destro in Scotland, eager to leave the intrigue and danger behind them. Sadly, the "Commander" wants his enemies routed, and stages an assault on Destro's castle. Turning the situation to his advantage, Destro captures the "Commander", and effectively takes control of Cobra.

Expecting favored status in this new unified Cobra, the Baroness is displeased to discover she has been paired with Zarana to run the Cobra Consulate in New York. The two even engage in a fight which ends up with Zarana pushing the Baroness out of the side door of a Cobra helicopter in mid-flight. However, the Baroness manages to catch on to one of the helicopter's wheels just as it lands on top of the Cobra embassy.

Zarana has implanted false memories into G.I. Joe members Clutch and Rock 'n Roll in Broca Beach. Betraying Zarana, the Baroness leaks word that the Joes will be moved to a Cobra submarine off the New Jersey shore where they will "escape." At the same time, Snake Eyes and Scarlett have journeyed to Switzerland to fix Snake Eyes' face. In another moment of fate, Snake Eyes meets with Dr. Hundtkinder, the same surgeon who treated the Baroness. Faxing her a photo of Snake Eyes before his disfigurement, the Baroness realizes that he is the man who shot her brother. Unwilling to let him slip through her fingers again, now that she knows the truth, the Baroness sabotages Zarana's van, allowing the Joes to capture the Dreadnoks, and rescue Clutch and Rock 'n Roll. Locked up in G.I. Joe Headquarters' sickbay, Zarana is listed in fair condition as, perhaps under the influence of painkillers, she tells the Joes about the Baroness' trip to Switzerland. But it is too late.

The Baroness combat assaults the Bern Institute in an out-of-control spree of violence. Trapping Scarlett and a recovering Snake Eyes, she shoots Scarlett in the head, and takes Snake Eyes back to New York. Holding him in the consulate's basement, Baroness is ready to watch the Paine Brothers torture Snake Eyes to her pleasure, but Destro arrives to get answers concerning Zarana's capture. She informs the brothers to watch Snake Eyes, but she is forced to keep a straight face as Snake Eyes overpowers the Paine Brothers and escapes into the Consulate proper. Meanwhile, Stalker, Storm Shadow, and former Crimson Guardsman Fred II (Wade Collins) have been listening to the proceedings on the G.I. Joe wire tap. Taking the opportunity to rush the consulate, they manage to get halfway up the building before Snake Eyes detonates a huge amount of C-4, setting the top of the building on fire, and threatening to topple the entire penthouse. The Baroness and a small force of Cobra Troops have barricaded themselves inside, and watch helplessly as Storm Shadow scales the side of the building and prepares to enter the penthouse.

Once inside, Storm Shadow calls for Snake Eyes, who reveals himself disguised as a Cobra trooper. The two of them decimate the entire Cobra army, just as the building gives way under the massive damage, caused by the explosions. The Baroness falls, only to be caught by Snake Eyes. Still filled with hate, she pulls her pistol on Snake Eyes when Destro returns in his helicopter and explains to her what he and his father saw that day back in Tet '68. Confused the Baroness is about to pull the trigger when another explosion rocks the building. Snake Eyes loses his grip and she plunges to her death only to be rescued this time by Storm Shadow, who tells her that he is not going to let her take the easy way out with all of her sins she has been carrying.

The ninjas help her onto Destro's chopper, and are rescued themselves by the Tomahawk. Broken by the revelation of her misguided hatred, the Baroness plans to leave Cobra, and figure out where her life is headed which even leaves General Hawk wondering if it is really possible that someone like the Baroness can really change. In a moment of absolute devotion, Destro removes his family mask, and tosses it aside. Together, James and Anastasia retire from Cobra.

After leaving the Iron Grenadiers to Darklon, the couple returns to Castle Destro and enjoys a period of quiet reflection. However, in their absence, Cobra undergoes a dramatic revolution as the original Cobra Commander returns, and buries most of Cobra's High Command in a freighter under the volcano on Cobra Island. After a failed attempt to kill Storm Shadow, the Commander turns his sights on the last two traitors to his cause: James and Ana.

==== Return to Cobra ====
Tipped off to the scheme by Metal-Head, Destro's spy in Cobra, the couple prepares to defend the Castle from a full assault. Destro and the Baroness manage to flee the Castle before it is destroyed, but while fleeing, the Baroness is hit and taken prisoner by the Cobra Commander. Subjected to the Brainwave Scanner, the Baroness is implanted with commands while the Commander wages an all-out Search and Destroy bounty on Destro. When the tables are turned, the Commander not only agrees to return the Baroness, but to give Destro the Silent Castle in Trans-Carpathia, in reparation for the Castle he destroyed.

In a double cross, the Baroness's hypnotic suggestions are activated by radio signal from a Cobra Hurricane. Before the Baroness can overpower Destro, they are attacked by Slice and Dice, who lead the Red Ninjas that dwell in the Castle's subcellars. As they fight for survival, the G.I. Joe team (called for protection by Destro) fights with an advance team of Cobra troops. The G.I. Joe Ninja Force arrives to defend Destro, while the Commander shows up to personally handle the matter, and the fighting escalates on all sides. Destro softens Baroness' hardened emotions by transforming his castle for her.

The two are pursued, captured and escape from Cobra again. This time, the forces against them include Dr. Biggles Jones and the seeming Joe traitor, Scarlett. Destro and the Baroness ally themselves with G.I. Joe and are taken to an abandoned Cobra Island, where they meet Zartan. After revealing Cobra's plans to revive Dr. Mindbender, Zartan returns to Trans-Carpathia with the couple, and takes back the Castle from a skeleton crew of Cobra troops.

Enjoying another short respite from Cobra, the trio is joined by Billy, returned from parts unknown. All too soon, however, the Cobra Commander arrives, and activates brain implants in both Destro and Zartan, bending them to his will. Although the Baroness and Billy utilize the Castle's secret passages to evade capture, they are thwarted by Destro himself. After being tortured for a time, Billy is ready to crack, and the Baroness does her best to keep him together. But Billy turns on his cellmate, ratting her out for trying to escape. When the two of them are brought up to the control room, Billy makes a mad dash to the console and launches an ICBM, alerting G.I. Joe to the goings-on in Trans-Carpathia.

In return for deceiving him, the Commander not only kicks the Baroness in the face, but proceeds to capture Storm Shadow, and reconfigure all three of their minds with the Brainwave Scanner. As Snake Eyes arrives to rescue them all, the Baroness emerges as part of Cobra Renewed, and helps route Snake Eyes and the G.I. Joe extraction force. When the Commander is temporarily taken hostage, the Baroness steps up, and assumes control of Cobra, reestablishing her abilities as a field commander.

The series ends here, with the Baroness still a willing member of Cobra.

=== Devil's Due ===
In "The Mission That Never Was", it is revealed that the core G.I. Joe members were sent on one final mission, which resulted in Cobra's Brainwave Scanner being corrupted by a virus that spread through the entirety of their mainframe. Crippled and defeated, Cobra then fell to a "unified military attack" (this attack is never detailed in a story, but hinted at in various "Battle Files" entries). A side effect of this confluence of events was the incapacitation of the Brainwave Scanner. Without repeated "self-medication" via the Scanner, the Baroness was freed from her artificial loyalty to Cobra. The two returned to Trans-Carpathia and retired from the intrigue and danger of Cobra, but continued to rebuild M.A.R.S. establishing an outpost in Scotland.

When Destro took ill, and his illegitimate son Alexander took over M.A.R.S. and the Destro identity, Baroness was forced to go along with him to keep James safe. Remaining stoically resistant to Alex' plan, the Baroness berates him with unfavorable comparisons to his father. Keeping the Commander in Scotland, along with Snake Eyes and Scarlett, the Baroness is forced to watch Alexander's strategist Mistress Armada spill secrets to the enemy. When Alexander's plan inevitably fails, the Baroness rescue him and Armada, only to deliver them to a seething, but cured, James Destro for punishment.

Various criminal factions, interested in learning all they can about Cobra Commander, capture the Baroness and Flint. The two are tied together and tortured. Baroness breaks free by using her glasses to cut the bonds and the two work together to escape. Destro and his Iron Grenadiers safely rescue her; as a parting 'gift', the Baroness kisses Flint right in front his love, Lady Jaye.

The Baroness works with Zandar in a plot to track down the Joe undercover officer, Chuckles, they kill four Joe "Greenshirts" agents in the process.

When Cobra Commander is captured by Serpentor and his new faction, the Coil, Destro is summoned to lead Cobra in a rescue mission. When the Commander returns to Cobra, Destro takes the opportunity to leave for good. In a shocking twist, however, the Baroness does not join him. After an elaborate scheme is derailed by Duke, Destro is arrested. The Commander leaves it to the Baroness to decide Destro's fate, and she votes to let him rot.

Put on trial by the U.N., Destro turns the tables and offers the guaranteed capture of Cobra Commander to assure his release. Taking his offer, the Joes are charged with transporting Destro by train, to lure Cobra into a trap. When both Cobra Commander and the Baroness arrive to free Destro, the Commander and Hawk throw down. Defeating his foe, the Commander shoots Hawk in the back, only to be shot by a traitorous Baroness.

The ruse is successful, and the Commander is in U.S. custody, leaving Destro and his pregnant wife in control of Cobra. This period is short-lived, however, and the Commander soon returns to reclaim Cobra once and for all. During the coup, the Baroness and Wraith (charged with her personal safety) are seemingly killed when the Commander detonates the Night Raven they are aboard.

=== America's Elite ===
The Baroness resurfaces, a year after the defeat of the Red Shadows, as a prisoner in the sub-basement of G.I. Joe's new headquarters, the Rock. Her existence is known to only a few, including General Joseph Colton, Duke, and Storm Shadow, who attempts to wrest information from her. But the Baroness is all-consumed by her desire for her baby, which she apparently carried to term, and has been separated from by the G.I. Joe team.

Storm Shadow passed the information about the Baroness' imprisonment to Snake Eyes, thinking he was about to sacrifice himself to save the G.I. Joe team on Destro's sub. The news then travels to Stalker and Scarlett, who take it upon themselves to confront Colton about the heinous act just as the Phoenix Guard attack the Rock. In the middle of the battle, the Baroness' cell is opened, and she makes her way to the roof, where she confronts and thoroughly thrashes Zarana (who was posing as Phoenix Guard member Friday) before escaping the Joe base.

The Baroness is the focal point of the follow-up story arc, "Sins of the Mother". Confronting Scalpel for his misdeeds, she tortures him with his own scalpel, and leaves him disfigured and near death. She then enlists the help of Major Bludd to enact revenge on G.I. Joe. Sending him to Saudi Arabia to distract the Joes, the Baroness then tracks down and kills Wraith herself. Taking his armor, she strikes a bargain with Red Shadows' leader Wilder Vaughn for the location of Cobra Commander. After dealing with Flint (who had been spying on the Shadows), the Baroness finally confronts Cobra Commander, only to be stopped by Destro himself.

The Joes arrive, including Flint, and are forced to lay down arms. Repeating her actions after the yakuza incident, Baroness kisses Flint, passing him something that enables him to free himself, and throwing the whole confrontation into upheaval. The situation is quelled, however, when Destro offers Cobra Commander control of M.A.R.S. in exchange for his infant son, Eugene.

When "World War III" begins, Storm Shadow tracks Destro and the Baroness to Japan where Destro agrees to help G.I. Joe fight Cobra Commander. Appalled that her husband would help "the enemy," Destro turns to her and tells her that it is only a matter of time before Cobra Commander betrays and comes after them. He is right as Cobra Commander has freed Dela Eden from prison and orders her to kill the steel-faced arms dealer and his wife. Storm Shadow then takes the couple to visit the G.I. Joe team in hiding where Destro informs Colonel Colton that he will need a piece of MARS technology to help G.I. Joe defeat it. In an uncomfortable moment, the Baroness turns to Scarlett and asks the red-head if her head still hurts.

After Barrel Roll and Recondo, who have both managed to infiltrate Cobra and steal a stealth-cloaked Night Raven, the Baroness travels to England where her husband helps re-engineer the Cobra technology that makes the Night Raven practically invincible. The Baroness then gathers her own army, code named—ATHENA FORCE—and fights Alexander Destro's Iron Grenadiers in London where they all surrender when they see Destro at the head of his wife's army. After World War III ends, the Baroness lives in humility as she hugs her son and watches Destro on trial for his crimes against humanity.

=== Action Force continuities ===
==== IPC ====
In IPC's Battle Action Force comic, Baroness was originally Anna von Stromberg, daughter of Austrian aristocrats. She joined a gang of small-time Communist radicals, encouraging them towards violence. Faking her death and assuming control of the group under the new name the Baroness, she leads them in a series of highly destructive terrorist acts across Europe, taking out oil refineries, air bases and dams. While paying lip service to the group's ideology, she only uses them to prove her strategic abilities to Cobra and get hired. Once Cobra Commander contacts her, she wipes out her group and made her way to Cobra's jungle base.

==== Marvel UK ====
The larger part of Marvel UK's run of Action Force were simple reprints of the American G.I. Joe comic. Most issues, however, feature an original Action Force story, usually a 5-page installment of a larger storyline. The Baroness' role in these issues was minimal, at best.

== Animation ==
=== Sunbow ===
The Baroness made her first appearance in the G.I. Joe mini-series, The MASS Device. She is voiced by actress Morgan Lofting with a European accent, which tends to waver between Germanic and Slavic. Her animated incarnation was a master of disguise, even pretending to be a camera man in a film crew. She is romantically involved with Destro, who often expresses frustration with her. On one occasion, Destro's unfaithfulness to the Baroness led to her bringing about the destruction of his ancestral home in an act of vengeance. The Baroness tends to try to set both herself and Destro up as Cobra's leaders, and shows contempt for other members of Cobra, such as Cobra Commander, Tomax and Xamot and the Dreadnoks.

In the episode "Spell of the Siren", the Baroness discovers a conch shell that hypnotizes men with its song of the Sirens. She uses it to bring most of the G.I. Joes (except the female members) under her spell and seize control of Cobra with Destro. However, her time of ruling Cobra is short-lived, as Xamot manages to escape her and aid the Joes in breaking the spell.

In "Worlds Without End", a group of Joes encounter an alternate reality in which Cobra rules the United States and G.I. Joe has been all but wiped out. In that reality, the Baroness is a double agent, Steeler's lover, and the only surviving Joe. The episode ends with the Baroness engineering a civil war between Cobra Commander and Destro, allowing the Joes to return to their own reality.

The Baroness is not directly involved in the plot to create Serpentor in season two, but is later seen loyal to him.

==== G.I. Joe: The Movie ====
Baroness appeared briefly in the 1987 animated film G.I. Joe: The Movie. She voices her disapproval against Cobra Commander, and is present at his trial. When the Joes have placed the Broadcast Energy Transmitter (B.E.T.) in a secure area, the Baroness finds its location and reports it to Cobra and Cobra-La.

=== DiC ===
In DiC's G.I. Joe cartoon, Baroness is voiced again by Morgan Lofting in Season 1, and by Suzanne Errett-Balcom in Season 2. In the "Operation: Dragonfire" miniseries, she is upset and humiliated to hear that Destro has dumped her in favor for Zarana. The Baroness plots with Gnawgahyde to return Cobra Commander back to human form. After she accomplishes this with Dragonfire energy, she conspires with him to overthrow Serpentor and regain control of Cobra. She convinces Destro to reunite, resulting in him dumping Zarana, and becomes loyal to Cobra Commander once again.

=== Spy Troops and Valor vs. Venom ===
The Baroness appeared in the direct-to-video animated movies G.I. Joe: Spy Troops and G.I. Joe: Valor vs. Venom, voiced by Teryl Rothery.

=== Resolute ===
In the G.I. Joe: Resolute miniseries, the Baroness and Destro are part of a subplot in which they have taken a team of scientists hostage. Roadblock, Gung-Ho and Stalker have to rescue them before Destro starts killing them. The Baroness was voiced by Grey DeLisle.

=== Renegades ===
In G.I. Joe: Renegades, Baroness appears as Cobra Commander's second-in-command, voiced by Tatyana Yassukovich. She serves as the communications director and PR secretary for Cobra Industries. Like the comics and the other cartoons, Baroness is romantically involved with Destro.

In the episode "Homecoming Pt. 2", Baroness was sent to reclaim the console that the Joes stole from where a Cobra Christmas party was being held which is now on a military train bound for Washington. Wearing a full helmet and using weapons made for her by Destro, Baroness infiltrates the military train and reclaims the console following a fight with Duke and Flint. Minutes later, Baroness is approached by Storm Shadow (who partially helped her on the military train) who would like to form an alliance with her and Cobra Industries.

In "Fire Fight," Baroness and Doctor Mindbender send Firefly to Green Ridge to burn it to the ground following their protest of a dam that was being built near their town.

In "Knockoffs", Baroness picked up a Chameleon Mold from a scientist that invented it and ended up mindwiping the scientist so that he could not report it to the authorities. During the transport, Baroness and the Cobra soldiers with her were ambushed by the Joes until Flint and Lady Jaye (who were using Zartan to track the Joes) arrived. Zartan escaped with the Chameleon Mold and the Joes gave pursuit. When asked by Flint on why her men fired on him, Baroness claimed that she thought they were with the Joes. When Flint called in Wild Bill for help, Baroness went with Flint and Lady Jaye stating that Zartan stole something from him. After Zartan was defeated, Baroness reclaimed the Chameleon Mold. Due to a fail-safe feature that locks on to the DNA of the first user and the scientist who invented it having been mindwiped, Baroness ended up visiting Zartan in prison with a "get out of prison" offer that Zartan accepted.

In "Union of the Snake", Baroness and Doctor Mindbender worked on a mind-control plot involving the Black Adder phones and the siphoning of Tomax and Xamot's psychic abilities. During that time, it is revealed that Baroness' family has done things that made them enemies of the Oktober Guard (namely Red Star). The Joes were able to thwart their plans before Red Star could blow up the Cisarovna Chateau while Tomax and Xamot escaped upon temporarily mind-controlling Baroness and Doctor Mindbender.

In "Cousins", Baroness and some soldiers accompany Major Bludd in hunting the Joes in Mississippi. Though the Joes repelled them, Major Bludd ended up emerging from the water following an alligator attack where his missing right arm ended up surprising Baroness. In "Going Underground," Baroness operated a remote-controlled burrowing excavator in order to make tunnels for Cobra Industries with Cobra Commander overseeing her work. After Snake Eyes cut the power to the burrowing excavator, Cobra Commander tells Baroness to give him a reason why he shouldn't dispose of her. Baroness tells Cobra Commander that she has Destro and Doctor Mindbender working on a back-up plan.

In "Revelations Pt. 2", Baroness leads a bunch of Bio-Vipers to attack the Joes in order to swipe Scarlett's locket when it turns out that her locket has part of a crystal that is needed in order to power the M.A.S.S. Device. Scarlett and Snake Eyes fight Baroness and Doctor Mindbender in the room where the M.A.S.S. device is. Overwhelming Bio-Vipers end up defeating Scarlett and Snake Eyes where a message that her father had said causes Baroness and Doctor Mindbender to force Scarlett into entering the code to the M.A.S.S. Device using Snake Eyes as bait. The M.A.S.S. Device is a success as Professor Patrick O'Hara emerges from the M.A.S.S. device. After Snake Eyes ends up destroying the M.A.S.S. Device, its destruction causes a wormhole that sucks Baroness and Doctor Mindbender in. It is unknown what happened to them though it is likely they survived.

=== Sigma 6 ===
In the series G.I. Joe: Sigma 6, the Baroness is loyal to Cobra Commander. In a departure from her previous incarnations, her fingers appear to be composed of metal, suggesting they are cybernetic in nature. If so, how much of her hands and arms are robotic is unknown, since they are covered in long gloves with only the fingers exposed. She is also shown to have the ability to create holographic duplicates of herself to distract or confuse her opponents.

Devil's Due created a mini-series based on G.I. Joe: Sigma 6. It follows the style and the content of the animated series, spotlighting a different member of Sigma 6 and Cobra in each issue. Baroness appears in issue #4, opposite Scarlett. Baroness kidnaps a prime minister after using members of the Dreadnoks to distract Scarlett. In the end, Scarlett finds her, and after a few taunts from Baroness, Scarlett beats Baroness and recovers the Prime Minister.

The Baroness was also released as a 2.5 inches (64 mm) figure.

== Live-action film ==
The Baroness
- G.I. Joe character
- First appearance: 2009; 2021
- Portrayed by: Sienna Miller (2009); Úrsula Corberó (2021)
- Voiced by: Grey DeLisle (video game)

In-universe information
- Affiliation: Cobra
- Specialty: Intelligence Officer
- File name: Ana Lewis; Anastasia DeCobray
- Series: G.I. Joe: The Rise of Cobra; Snake Eyes

Sienna Miller portrays The Baroness in Stephen Sommers' 2009 film G.I. Joe: The Rise of Cobra. In the film, The Baroness was originally Ana Lewis, Duke's fiancée whom he left out of guilt for the presumed death of her brother Rex, whom he had failed to protect when they were fighting together in the United States Army. She is then kidnapped by a still-alive now-insane Rex who uses the perfected nanomites on her; as a result, she becomes a member of Cobra and her hair color is changed from natural blonde to raven black. As a Cobra agent, Baroness is also trained in ninjitsu and martial arts by Storm Shadow, whom she works with to acquire M.A.R.S Industries-created nanomite warheads. She marries Baron Daniel DeCobray, assuming the name of Baroness Anastasia DeCobray, so Cobra can make use of his research to weaponize the nanomite warheads. Baroness initially fails to capture the warheads from G.I. Joe, but she later invades the Pit with Storm Shadow and Zartan, where she steals the warheads and defeats Scarlett in a fight. After capturing Duke in Paris and bringing him to Cobra's Arctic base, Ana overcomes her programming and saves Duke, helping him bring Cobra Commander and Destro to justice. Ana is detained aboard the USS Flagg until the nanomites can be safely removed from her body and then shares a kiss with Duke.

Baroness appears again in the 2021 reboot film Snake Eyes, portrayed by Úrsula Corberó. An old enemy of G.I. Joe member Scarlett, who has been observing her activity, Baroness is linked to many terrorist attacks, including killing a member of parliament along with 200 civilians to influence an election. She has also been arming yakuza boss Kenta with weapons so that he can take control of the Arashikage clan and obtain a magical artifact called the "Jewel of the Sun" for the Cobra organization. Snake Eyes steals the Jewel for Kenta and Baroness in exchange the location of his father's murderer. After Kenta betrays her and reveals he only intends to use the Jewel for himself, Baroness agrees to a temporary alliance with Scarlett and the Arashikage clan, helping them defeat Kenta's forces. In a mid-credits scene, Baroness appears on Tommy Arashikage's private jet and recruits him into Cobra.

== Video games ==
The Baroness is one of the featured villains in the 1985 G.I. Joe: A Real American Hero computer game. She is also featured as a boss in the 1992 G.I. Joe arcade game.

In the video game G.I. Joe: The Rise of Cobra, she is the first boss, who is fought towards the end of the "Arctic Arsenal" act. She is voiced by Grey DeLisle.

She appears as both a playable character and boss in the game G.I. Joe: Operation Blackout.
