= Zandar =

Character in G.I. Joe

- G.I. Joe character
- First appearance: G.I. Joe: A Real American Hero issue #51 (September 1986)
- Voiced by: Peter Cullen

In-universe information
- Affiliation: Dreadnoks
- Specialty: Zartan's Brother
- File name: Zachary (Last name unknown; various aliases
- Birth place: Unknown (possibly somewhere in Florida)
- Primary MOS: Camouflage
- Secondary MOS: Covert movement

Zandar is a fictional character from the G.I. Joe: A Real American Hero toyline, comic books and animated series. He is affiliated with Cobra as a member of the Dreadnoks. He is portrayed by Matt Gerald in the 2013 film G.I. Joe: Retaliation.

== Profile ==
Zandar is the younger brother of Zartan and the fraternal twin of Zarana Zandar excels at his specialty as a master of camouflage and covert movement as an infiltrator and assassin. Zandar has also used disguise in his repertoire and can disguise himself as anyone. He is a master of silent weapons, including harpoons, crossbows, Bowie knives and silenced handguns, and is capable of remaining motionless for long periods.

Zandar is the secondborn of twins; his sister Zarana often the unequivocal leader of the two, and he dresses in blues and pinks, similar to Zarana, and wears a torn scarf which is material from her tattered pink shirt. Like his sister, Zandar has naturally auburn hair.

The Dreadnoks are frightened of Zandar for an undisclosed reason—one of them was late for patrol and another commented "Get goin mate, Zandar's supervising tonight. If he's on your bad side you better hope the gators get you first." Zandar is the only other Dreadnok that Road Pig has obeyed besides Zarana.

== Action figure ==
Zandar and his twin sister Zarana were introduced in 1986, along with the second wave of Dreadnok action figures. Zandar and Zarana were made of the same UV reactive plastic as Zartan, and when exposed to direct sunlight, their skin would turn dark blue.

The Zandar figure had a punk appearance with orange hair, a blue bandana, earrings, red facial markings, a shirtless torso with jagged tattoos, and a pink neck kerchief. For accessories he carried a speargun and had a pack of spears on his back.

== Comics ==
=== Marvel Comics ===
Zandar and Zarana operated several scams and schemes for Cobra, using their advanced skills as con artists. Later Zarana spent a lot of time with Cobra Commander and Zandar was nowhere to be seen.

In the Marvel Comics G.I. Joe series, he first appeared in G.I. Joe: A Real American Hero #51 (September 1986) as part of a successful rescue attempt of Zartan. Zandar briefly disguised himself as an auto mechanic at Zartan's hideout while the others hid, and diverted the Joes on their tail, who did not realize it was the young punk.

During the first Cobra civil war (which takes place on Cobra Island) Zandar and his siblings commanded troops on the side of Cobra Commander. A few issues later, Zandar is seen helping a squad of Dreadnoks oversee the new Cobra stronghold of Broca Beach, New Jersey.

Zandar helps successfully create a new call center for Cobra marketing schemes; this despite interference from a G.I. Joe squad.

=== Devil's Due comics ===
Zandar and his siblings grew up in a Catholic orphanage. He was small for his age and was bullied by other children. His older brother accidentally killed a boy for bullying young Zandar. As teenagers, the twins grew up on the streets of London rather than be separated to different foster homes. He and his sister searched out their brother and found themselves in the outback of Australia as members of the Dreadnok biker gang.

Zandar fights against invading Joe forces when Zartan's expanded Everglades headquarters comes under attack. He and Road Pig capture Scarlett and Snake Eyes.

Zandar turned up alongside the Baroness when Cobra made a deal with radical terrorist Tyler Wingfield in Devil's Due's G.I. Joe: Frontline. He and the Baroness kill four agents guarding a safe house.

Civil war took over Cobra Island once again. As a masked member of the Coil, Zandar fought Zartan, but the younger brother lost, taking a knife in the gut. Zandar removed his mask, revealing himself to Zartan, who had not realized until that moment it was Zandar fighting him. Zartan pulls all his forces, which would have lost the battle for Cobra if Cobra Commander had not personally seen to Serpentor himself being taken down. Without a leader, the Coil fell to Cobra's newest troopers, the Neo-Vipers.

Zandar's actions come back to affect him when Duke and former Joe commander, Phillip Rey, arrive at a Dreadnoks HQ to confront him for information. Zartan literally throws Zandar at the pair, saying that apart from killing him, the two can do what they wish; this is Zandar's punishment for betraying Cobra.

Picture of Zandar from IDW Publishing.

=== IDW ===
Zandar and Zarana make an appearance supplying weapons to the Heathens motorcycle gang, who are working under "The One's" program. Concerned only with their money, not the gang's politics or goals, the twins demand their payment, but not before a G.I. Joe strike team attacks and orders them to surrender. The twins flee on their motorbike, but not before realizing neither one of them collected their fee. They also realize "The One" considers them expendable and vow to put an end to "The One." Shipwreck follows them as they speed away, informing them he's got them outgunned. Zandar and Zarana use holography to conceal themselves and their bike. The Dreadnok twins were apprehended shortly thereafter and taken into custody.

=== IDW post-Revolutionaries ===
The Dreadnok Twins, disguised as inner Mongolian locals, Ying and Yong, lead a strike team of GI Joes to Crystal Ball's cult stronghold, where they were ambushed by Crystal Ball and the Dreadnoks. Zandar and Zarana sneak away some time during the battle.

During the Dreadnoks' pursuit of the Joes, they were snatched away underground by Crystal Ball's summoned, large "Fatal Fluffies". Zandar and Zarana appear again with the Dreadnoks, ambushing Duke in the underground, with the intention of taking the Joes' prisoners, the Baroness and Crystal Ball.

== Animated series ==
=== Sunbow ===
Zandar appeared in the second season of the Sunbow G.I. Joe cartoon voiced by Peter Cullen and understudied by Milton James in "Arise Serpentor, Arise" Pt. 5. In the five-part episode "Arise Serpentor, Arise," Zandar and Zarana join Zartan in finding new recruits for the Dreadnoks. During this five-part episode, Roger C. Carmel voiced Zandar in the second part and Milton James voiced Zandar in the fifth part when Peter Cullen was unavailable for those two episodes.

In "Raise the Flagg!", Cobra attempts to salvage an antimatter pod from a crashed helicarrier of theirs. Cobra soldiers under the command of Zartan, Zandar and Zarana use an oil platform for the operation. The three Dreadnoks flee during a battle with the Joes and are sent by Cobra Commander to recover the antimatter pod before the Joes. They are taken prisoner alongside Roadblock, Leatherneck and Wet-Suit by an insane Cobra chef named B.A. LaCarre and his B.A.T.s, who force them into labor. The Joes, Dreadnoks and LaCarre eventually put aside their differences and hook the antimatter pod to the helicarrier's rotors, rising them out of the water. Cobra Troopers take the Dreadnoks to a chamber to recover from decompression sickness.

=== G.I. Joe: The Movie ===
Zandar also appeared briefly in the 1987 animated film G.I. Joe: The Movie.

== Live action film ==
Zandar
- G.I. Joe character
- First appearance: 2013
- Portrayed by: Matt Gerald

In-universe information
- Affiliation: Cobra
- Series: G.I. Joe: Retaliation

Zandar appears in the 2013 film G.I. Joe: Retaliation, portrayed by actor Matt Gerald. In the film, Zandar is a member of Cobra, and the head of the detail for the President of the United States (his brother Zartan in disguise). He was shot and killed by General Joseph Colton, when he was holding the real President of the United States hostage.

== Other works ==
Zandar's figure is briefly featured in the fiction novel 6 Sick Hipsters. In the story, the character Paul Achting spent four years collecting G.I. Joe figures to set up a battle scene between the Joes and Cobra. As he imagined the characters in his head, he described the Dreadnoks as "an elite team of maniacal mercenaries allied with Cobra for this battle", with the figures lying in the thick of the shag carpet, and sitting next to Monkeywrench was Zandar, "the leader of the Dreadnoks and master of disguise though he looked more like a member of Duran Duran circa Arena than a crazed killer".
