= Zarana =

Character in G.I. Joe

- G.I. Joe character
- First appearance: G.I. Joe: A Real American Hero issue #50 (August 1986)
- Voiced by: Lisa Raggio (Sunbow/Marvel); Lisa Corps (DiC)

In-universe information
- Affiliation: Dreadnoks
- Specialty: Zartan's Sister
- File name: Zoe (Last name unknown. Aliases too numerous to list: Friday, Heather, Sgt.Carol Weidler, Dr. Deborah Karday)
- Birth place: Unknown (possibly Florida)
- Primary MOS: Infiltration
- Secondary MOS: Espionage

Zarana is a fictional character from the G.I. Joe: A Real American Hero toyline, comic books and animated series. She is affiliated with Cobra as a member of the Dreadnoks.

== Profile ==
Zarana is the younger sister of Zartan and fraternal twin of Zandar. A professional assassin, she is an expert in small arms, explosives and edged weapons. Zarana is a master of disguise who can fool even the best military specialists. She relies on masks, wigs, makeup and costumes. She is also a world-class method actress, literally becoming the object of her impersonation, to the extent that she not only thinks but reacts as they would.

She has short naturally auburn hair, which has been dyed pink (or sometimes red), and is usually depicted with a tattered hot pink T-shirt and blue pants, colors that match her twin brother, Zandar. She is the firstborn of the twins, and often the unequivocal leader of the two. She supposedly also has the same ability to change skin color as her brothers, but this was never portrayed in either her comic book or cartoon incarnations. According to former G.I. Joe product manager Kirk Bozigian at the 2013 Official G.I. Joe Convention, Zarana's original filecard art was inspired by 80's punk rock singer Wendy O. Williams.

== Toys ==
Along with her twin brother Zandar, Zarana was released in 1985 . She carries a weapon that looked like a shotgun with a circular saw blade attached at the end. This weapon was never seen in the cartoon or comic book. She had several features in the comic, primarily in issues that introduced Dreadnok vehicles produced by Hasbro. Zarana's pink shirt was designed, by Hasbro designer Ron Rudat, to resemble Zandar's torn pink kerchief.

== Comics ==
=== Marvel Comics ===
In the Marvel Comics G.I. Joe series, she first appeared in G.I. Joe: A Real American Hero #50 (August 1986).

Zarana was featured in the Marvel G.I. Joe comics and in the beginning was depicted as being somewhat cheap when it came to money. After she leads a successful rescue of Zartan by impersonating Scarlett, she tells her brother that he owes her for a number of expenses related to the rescue operation including that of the red wig she used in her disguise. Pursued by a large team of G.I. Joes, she and the Dreadnoks escape. They are technically tracked down by Sgt. Slaughter but her disguise skills help fool the man into believing he had found a simple gas station.

She was featured in issues #69 through #71. In order to escape the fictional war-torn country of Sierra Gordo, she and fellow Dreadnoks Monkeywrench and Thrasher hijack a G.I. Joe transport plane. This is accomplished by Zarana threatening to kill some of the civilians who are pleading with the Joes for a ride out. The Joes Crazylegs, Wild-Bill and Maverick are forced to launch out with her, her allies and the refugee/hostages. The plane ends up shot down, though all survive. In an effort to escape the country, Zarana works with the Joe team, the Dreadnoks, and the refugees. In one instance, she punches Thrasher's broken arm in order to get him to be even more violent against a large group of adversaries.

Zarana and the Dreadnoks would work with the Joes again, like much of Cobra, in the aftermath of the Cobra Civil War. The stress gets to her, leading to a memorable, vicious fist-fight with Lady Jaye, that ends in a draw.

Zarana is a fearless fighter and risk taker. She took on a lot of responsibilities for Cobra after Destro, Zartan and the Baroness left, effectively becoming Cobra Commander's second in command. She was captured by Firefly, but was rescued by Slice and Dice who found her by accident. She is reunited with Cobra. As revealed in her complaints, she had spent months in a dungeon on Cobra Island, abandoned there with Road Pig and Cesspool. She was partly responsible for recruiting Scarlett (although Scarlett turned out to be a double agent). After Dr. Mindbender was revived by Cobra Commander, he "cut Zarana loose" and she returns to the Dreadnoks.

=== Devil's Due ===
Picture of Zarana from Devil's Due Publishing.

Zarana and her siblings grew up in a Catholic orphanage. Her older brother, Zartan, accidentally killed a boy for bullying young Zandar. As teenagers, the twins grew up on the streets of London rather than be separated to different foster homes. She and Zandar searched out their brother, Zartan, and found themselves in the outback of Australia as members of the Dreadnok biker gang.

Zarana leads a Dreadnoks/Cobra squad against an out of control Battle Android Trooper. She loses several Alley Vipers. A grenade thrown by a G.I. Joe squad injures her, though she is still mobile. Zartan orders Zanya to leave with her; they try to escape in a Cobra Coil motorcycle, but circumstances change and they are arrested with most of the other Dreadnoks.

In the America's Elite series, Cobra Commander disguises himself as White House staff member Garret Freedlowe, and tricks General Rey into leading a new elite unit called Phoenix Guard. Zarana is one of the Cobra operatives who poses as a Guard member, and is given the new codename "Friday", real name Jennifer K. Larson, born in Hialeah, Florida. Friday's specialties were infantry, heavy weapons, tracking, unit supply specialist and mechanical technician. She received basic training at Fort Jackson, and advanced infantry training at Fort Lee. She also completed the Unit Armorer School at Fort Hood, the Marksman Instructor course and Airborne School at Fort Benning, and the Counter-Sniper course at Camp Robinson, Arkansas. She was the team's weapons specialist, and second-in-command to General Rey. Following the Guard's attack on The Rock, Zarana is taken into custody by the Joes and imprisoned in "The Coffin", a maximum security penitentiary located in Greenland. She later escapes imprisonment alongside several others, during a raid on the facility led by Tomax. At the conclusion of the World War III storyline, Zarana is revealed to have escaped the mass defeat and capture of Cobra's forces, and is back with the Dreadnoks (who are now sans Zartan).

The comic series Dreadnoks Declassified reveals that Zarana's given name is Zoe.

=== IDW ===
Zarana and Zandar were born in London, England, into dire poverty and were placed for adoption as toddlers. From an early age, the twins displayed anti-social behavior. As a result, they were moved from foster home to foster home, until they landed in an abusive orphanage. As teenagers, Zarana and Zandar were faced with the threat of separation, so they took to the streets to remain together, and from there, procured plane tickets to Australia, where they joined the Dreadnoks biker gang.

Picture of Zarana from IDW Publishing.

Zarana and Zandar supply weapons to the warring Heathens motorcycle gang. A G.I. Joe strike team interrupts the transaction, telling the two to surrender. Zandar and Zarana flee, but not before realizing neither of them claimed their fee beforehand. Realizing "The One" considers them expendable, the twins make eliminating "The One" their next major priority. Shipwreck pursues them, telling the twins that they are outgunned and not to fire back. Zandar and Zarana respond that they must go out of sight, and use holography to conceal their motorbike as they make their escape. The Dreadnok twins were apprehended shortly thereafter and taken into custody.

=== IDW post-Revolutionaries ===
The Dreadnok Twins, disguised as inner Mongolian locals, Ying and Yong, lead a strike team of G.I. Joes to Crystal Ball's cult stronghold, where they were ambushed by Crystal Ball and the Dreadnoks. Zandar and Zarana sneak away some time during the battle.

During the Dreadnoks' pursuit of the Joes, they were snatched away underground by Crystal Ball's summoned, large "Fatal Fluffies". Zarana and Zandar appear again with the Dreadnoks, ambushing Duke in the underground, with the intention of taking the Joes' prisoners, the Baroness and Crystal Ball.

== Animated series ==
=== Sunbow ===
Zarana first appears in the G.I. Joe second-season miniseries "Arise, Serpentor, Arise!", voiced by Lisa Raggio. She and Zandar join their brother Zartan when he is auditioning new members of the Dreadnoks. Zarana later steals the DNA of fictional Egyptian general Xanuth Amon-Toth, as part of Doctor Mindbender's plot to create Serpentor.

In the episode "Computer Complications", Zarana goes undercover at the G.I. Joe headquarters as "Carol Weidler" to program the robot submarines under Cobra control. Unexpectedly, she and Mainframe develop romantic feelings for each other, which hinders her progress. She eventually finishes her task, and also saves Mainframe's life when Zartan leaves an explosive on him. At the end of the episode, Zartan, sitting with the Dreadnoks at a campfire, mocks her as she stands off from the group, gazing at the Moon: "Hey, Zarana, I've been thinking! Maybe you ought to quit the Dreadnoks, go marry that wimp, get a house in the suburbs, have kids." She responds by shooting in the direction of the Dreadnoks' campfire, causing them to scatter. The episode ends showing both Mainframe and Zarana, miles away from each other looking at the Moon, perhaps pondering the same question. She briefly reunites with Mainframe in "Grey Hairs And Growing Pains", in which she secretly supplies him with the antidote that would restore him (and the other Joes) to their proper ages.

In "Raise the Flagg!", Cobra attempts to salvage an antimatter pod from a crashed helicarrier of theirs. Cobra soldiers under the command of Zartan, Zarana and Zandar use an oil platform for the operation. The three Dreadnoks flee during a battle with the Joes and are sent by Cobra Commander to recover the antimatter pod before the Joes. They are taken prisoner alongside Roadblock, Leatherneck and Wet-Suit by an insane Cobra chef named B.A. LaCarre and his B.A.T.s, who force them into labor. When arguments break out among the Joes and Dreadnoks, LaCarre tries to have his B.A.T.s execute Zarana. She is briefly saved by the efforts Roadblock and Zartan, but LaCarre decides to kill Roadblock along with her. The execution is stopped by an attack on the ship, after which Zarana is helped out of a pile of wreckage by Wet Suit and says she never thought a Joe would help her except into a jail cell. The Joes, Dreadnoks and LaCarre eventually put aside their differences and hook the antimatter pod to the helicarrier's rotors, rising them out of the water. Cobra Troopers take the Dreadnoks to a chamber to recover from decompression sickness.

In "Sins of Our Fathers", Zarana disguises herself as a woman named Chipper Dougan and hires Dial-Tone, who was apparently discharged from G.I. Joe, to design a communications system. The project is secretly intended to awaken a creature in a pit near the ruins of Destro's castle that Cobra Commander would then send to kill Serpentor. Zarana monitors Dial-Tone's activity and reports to the Joes using a voice modulator that changes her voice to that of Flint, who spied on Cobra's scheme and was captured. In a later scuffle with Dial-Tone for control of the machine, Zarana's cover is blown when Dial-Tone knocks her mask off.

=== G.I. Joe: The Movie ===
In G.I. Joe: The Movie, Zarana impersonates a blonde woman named Heather, who convinces Lt. Falcon to give her a "tour" of the place where Serpentor is being held. She uses mini-cameras in her earrings to take pictures of the prison. Duke catches them and has Jinx escort "Heather" out of the base. Heather comments on Falcon being attractive before driving away. She stops at a lake, where she changes out of her disguise and meets with the Dreadnoks. The information from Zarana and the device she plants in G.I. Joe's base helps the Dreadnoks and Cobra-La break Serpentor out. When a group of Joes sneak into Cobra-La, Zarana is knocked out by Jinx.

=== DiC ===
Zarana appears in the DIC-produced G.I. Joe cartoon, in which she is shown to be leading the Dreadnoks, as Zartan does not appear in the series. In this series, she is voiced by Lisa Corps. Destro has left Baroness for Zarana, and the two are dating during the "Operation: Dragonfire" miniseries. When Cobra Commander disposes of Serpentor, he tells Destro to get back together with Baroness, which ends with Destro sending Zarana down a trap door.

After the miniseries, Zarana appears in the following episodes:

- "Nozone Conspiracy" - she appears along with Cobra Commander, Metal-Head and Gnawgahyde promoting a Cobra sunscreen.
- "Injustice and the Cobra Way" - Zarana and Cobra Commander (disguised as a superhero) capture the female president to take over the White House.
- "General Confusion" - Zarana disguises herself as "Dr. Deborah Carday", a member of the U.S. Senate. She then gives the G.I. Joe Team massive expenses, which come under review by the government, while she also tricks Big Ben into falling in love with her.
- "The Mind Mangler" - Zarana disguises herself as the daughter of a Cobra operative named Mind Mangler (in reality a robot). Zarana tries to interrogate Duke, but the Sky Patrol comes to his rescue. Zarana accompanies them, but she is discovered and has to retreat.

== Other works ==
- Zarana's figure is briefly featured in the fiction novel 6 Sick Hipsters. In the story, the character Paul Achting spent four years collecting G.I. Joe figures to set up a battle scene between the Joes and Cobra. As he imagined the characters in his head, he described the Dreadnoks as "an elite team of maniacal mercenaries allied with Cobra for this battle", with the figures lying in the thick of the shag carpet, and to the left of Zandar and Monkeywrench was "the lovely Zarana, Zartan's sister, sharpening her knife and dreaming of warm flesh".
- She is mentioned as a strong female character in the non-fiction novel 'Action chicks: new images of tough women in popular culture'.
