= Wet Suit (G.I. Joe) =

Character in G.I. Joe

- G.I. Joe character
- Wet Suit as seen in the Sunbow/Marvel G.I. Joe animated series.
- First appearance: G.I. Joe: A Real American Hero issue #47 (May 1986)
- Voiced by: Jack Angel (Sunbow/Marvel); Maurice LaMarche (DiC); Phil Hayes (Valor vs. Venom)

In-universe information
- Affiliation: G.I. Joe
- Specialty: SEAL (Sea, Air and Land)
- File name: Forrest, Brian M.
- Birth place: Myrtle Beach, South Carolina
- SN: RA701548793
- Rank: E-5 (Petty Officer 2nd Class); E-6 (Petty Officer 1st Class) (1992-present)
- Primary MOS: SEAL
- Secondary MOS: UDT
- Subgroups: SEALs

Wet Suit is a fictional character from the G.I. Joe: A Real American Hero toyline, comic books and animated series. He is one of the G.I. Joe Team's Navy SEALs and debuted in 1986.

== Profile ==
His real name is Brian M. Forrest and he holds the rank of Petty Officer Second Class (E-5). Wet Suit was born in Myrtle Beach, South Carolina.

Wet Suit knew from an early age he wanted to join the Navy and enlisted upon his graduation from high school. He eventually applied for SEAL training, was accepted and completed arguably the military's toughest training program. Like any other SEAL, Wet Suit gained a reputation for being tough and mean, though many instructors considered him the toughest and meanest. Seeking even greater challenges, Wet Suit signed on to the G.I. Joe Team.

Wet Suit is characterized by his analytical mind that contrasts with his abrasive personality. He is knowledgeable in classical literature and military tactics, having read many books regarding these subjects. His aggressive behavior contrasts with his more tender family life. Additionally, he maintains a long-standing rivalry with his teammate Leatherneck, reflecting the tradition of competition between the Navy SEALs and the USMC. While the two teammates often participate in verbal altercations and confrontations, their shared duties and responsibilities create a strong bond, which make them consider each other friends.

== Toys ==
Wet-Suit was first released as an action figure in 1986. His action figures often included flippers. A recolored version of his 86 figure is included in the Mission: Brazil set.

A new version of Wet-Suit was released in 1992. The figure was repainted and released as part of the Battle Corps line in 1993.

A version of Wet-Suit with no accessories came with the Built to Rule Depth Ray, which followed the G.I. Joe: Spy Troops story line. The forearms and the calves of the figure sported places where blocks could be attached.

Wet-Suit received a new sculpt action figure as part of the online exclusive set "Assault on Cobra Island". He was given a land-based sculpt as part of the "Mission: Brazil II" set that was sold at the 2011 G.I.Joe Collector's Convention.

== Comics ==
=== Marvel Comics ===
In the Marvel Comics G.I. Joe series, he first appeared in G.I. Joe: A Real American Hero #47 (May 1986). As a new Joe, his first mission is to work with Hawk and Beach-Head. The trio assault Cobra Island on a Joe craft, the 'Devil Fish', in an attempt to rescue Snake Eyes from danger. Later, he and Torpedo infiltrate Cobra Island, battle Croc Master, ally with the Oktober Guard and ultimately retreat with no clear progress gained.

=== Devil's Due ===
The Devil's Due series brings back many Joes after a long hiatus. Wet-Suit assists in retrieving a nuclear device from the crew of a Russian ship.

He later appears in the Special Missions Antarctica one-shot. A Data Desk profile on Wet-Suit featured in the book reveals his is married and expecting a child. Wet-Suit later cameos in the World War III storyline.

== Animated series ==
=== Sunbow ===
Wet Suit appeared in the original G.I. Joe animated series, voiced by Jack Angel. He was portrayed therein as being flippant, sarcastic, and crass, and although he regularly got into heated arguments with Leatherneck, both of them cared for each other as teammates and were willing to risk their lives for the other comrade in arms.

In the episode "Iceberg Goes South", Wet-Suit tests his new diving suit as part of a Joe mission in the Arctic. Much to his chagrin, Snow Job accidentally destroys his performance monitor. Beach Head does not allow extensions, but tells Wet-Suit he still has time to finish his project until Iceberg reports in. Hoping to extend time for his own project, Wet-Suit lets Iceberg visit his friend Mahiya at a nearby Tropodome lab before turning in his report. Wet Suit and Snow Job go to rescue Iceberg when he is captured; while Snow Job is also captured, Wet-Suit escapes and rescues him. He later lures Iceberg, who has transformed into a killer whale, away from a group of seals, allowing the Joes and Mahiya to restore him to human form.

In the episode "My Favorite Things", Wet-Suit is part of the team to stop Serpentor from stealing relics. Eager to surpass Leatherneck, Wet-Suit runs into Vlad Dracula's castle alone to confront Serpentor. When he is captured, Leatherneck saves him but is impaled by Serpentor's poison dart. Wet-Suit and Lifeline then follow the Cobra mothership to India to acquire a sample for an antivenom to save Leatherneck's life. They find a cup of serpent venom, but Wet-Suit uses it for revenge on a B.A.T. instead. With Lifeline's urging, Wet-Suit reluctantly confronts his fear of snakes by facing Serpentor's pet cobra, letting it bite him and obtaining a sample of its venom in the process. Before leaving, Wet-Suit blows up the Cobra mothership with a grenade. The episode ends with Wet-Suit and Leatherneck quarreling again as they recuperate.

In "Raise the Flagg!", Roadblock, Wet-Suit and Leatherneck scout the sunken USS Flagg, which G.I. Joe plans to salvage along with a crashed Cobra helicarrier contains an antimatter pod, and are taken prisoner alongside Zartan, Zarana and Zandar by an insane Cobra chef named B.A. LaCarre and his B.A.T.s, who force them into labor. Wet Suit later helps Zarana out of a pile of wreckage, after the ship is attacked in battle. The Joes, Dreadnoks and LaCarre eventually hook the antimatter pod to the helicarrier's rotors, rising them out of the water. While the Joes and LaCarre recover from decompression sickness in a chamber, Wet-Suit and Leatherneck argue over a game of cards.

In "Ninja Holiday", Wet-Suit is invited to compete in a martial arts tournament hosted by international criminal Pierre LaFonte (and secretly Cobra Commander). Sgt. Slaughter assumes Wet-Suit's identity and is captured to participate in the event. While Beach Head, Wet-Suit, Leatherneck, Sci-Fi and Low-Light search for Sgt. Slaughter in the Philippines, Wet-Suit is kidnapped by LaFonte's men and forced to fight Sgt. Slaughter. The two Joes attempt to escape. Wet-Suit frees the other competitors, who help the Joes defeat LaFonte's minions.

In "Joe's Night Out", Dial-Tone provides dates for himself, Wet-Suit and Leatherneck to go with them to a new nightclub in town. Unlike Leatherneck, Wet-Suit reciprocates his date's feelings. Soon, Serpentor sends the club into outer space and threatens to activate explosives planted on the club. The three Joes work together to save the people in the club, with Wet-Suit deactivating the explosives. He runs out of air before he could deactivate all of them, but Leatherneck helps him finish his task. After Wet-Suit regains consciousness, he and Leatherneck convert the club's engines to run on the air within the club, allowing it to return to Earth.

=== G.I. Joe: The Movie ===
Wet Suit also appeared briefly in the 1987 animated film G.I. Joe: The Movie. An early version of the script features a brief exchange between him and Leatherneck as the Joes are invading Cobra-La.

=== DiC ===
Wet Suit reappeared in the second season of DiC's G.I. Joe animated series, voiced by Robert O. Smith.

=== Valor vs. Venom ===
Wet Suit appeared in the direct-to-video CGI animated movie G.I. Joe: Valor vs. Venom, voiced by Phil Hayes.

== Video games ==
Wet Suit is featured as a playable character in the 1992 game G.I. Joe: The Atlantis Factor.

== Novel ==
Wet Suit plays a supporting role in the G.I. Joe novel Fool's Gold.
