= Leatherneck (G.I. Joe) =

Character in G.I. Joe

- G.I. Joe character
- Leatherneck as seen in the Sunbow/Marvel G.I. Joe animated series.
- First appearance: 1986
- Voiced by: Chuck McCann

In-universe information
- Affiliation: G.I. Joe
- Specialty: Marine
- File name: Metzger, Wendell A.
- Birth place: Stromsburg, Nebraska
- SN: RA 368-10-0025
- Rank: E-7 (Gunnery Sergeant)
- Primary MOS: Infantry
- Secondary MOS: Drill Instructor

Leatherneck is a fictional character from the G.I. Joe: A Real American Hero toyline, comic books and animated series. He is a Marine with the G.I. Joe Team and debuted in 1986.

== Profile ==
His real name is Wendell A. Metzger, and his rank is that of gunnery sergeant (E-7). Leatherneck was born in Stromsburg, Nebraska.

Leatherneck's primary military specialty is infantry, and his secondary military specialty is drill instructor. Before joining the G.I. Joe Team, Leatherneck served as a corporal in Gitmo, then as a tech sergeant in the 1st Recon Bn in Vietnam, then a drill instructor on Parris Island, and then a gunny at Camp Lejeune. He earned a reputation for toughness in all of these places, and while he may not come off as likable, he has proven himself trustworthy.

As a drill instructor, Leatherneck assumes the role of an enemy when training Joes, turning himself into an insurmountable obstacle. He's proof that you don't need to like your fellow soldiers in order to fight beside them. Leatherneck is ill tempered, obnoxious, and holds irrational grudges against those who don't fit his definition of "worthy". The only teammate he seems to connect with is Wet Suit, and according to rumor, the two can't stand each other. Their rivalry stems from the tradition of competition between the Navy and the Marine Corps, but their constant bickering conceals a shared respect.

== Toys ==
Leatherneck was first released as an action figure in 1986.

A new version of Leatherneck was released in 1993 as part of the Battle Corps line.

== Comics ==
Leatherneck made his first appearance in issue #49 and appeared in the following issue in which he was tasked with leading an assault team to infiltrate and take back the town of Springfield from the control of the evil organization known as Cobra. They had to face off against the newly created Serpentor, who was leading the holding-forces. Leatherneck and his squad were successful in their mission, demonstrating his tactical prowess and bravery.

Leatherneck was one of the ground troops who stormed the beaches of Cobra Island in the second Cobra civil war. The Joes faced off against a heavily fortified enemy, but Leatherneck and his fellow soldiers were instrumental in their victory.

== Animated series ==
=== Sunbow ===
Leatherneck first appeared in the Sunbow/Marvel G.I. Joe second-season episode "Arise, Serpentor, Arise!: Part I", voiced by Chuck McCann. He was often arguing with fellow Joe Wet-Suit (who was a Navy Seal), and was known for being uncouth, loud and hotheaded. Despite their frequent fighting, Leatherneck and Wet-Suit still care for each other.

Leatherneck played a part in the episode "Let's Play Soldier," where he has an encounter with street orphans in an Asian town, at the same time that Doctor Mindbender and the Dreadnoks are harvesting a special tree sap, which causes anyone who comes in contact with it to act like mindless zombies. Doctor Mindbender tries twice to offer Leatherneck a piece of gum, which contained the sap as one of the ingredients. Once Mindbender's plot is thwarted, Leatherneck is able to get the local innkeeper to take the street orphans in as fellow workers much to the objection of the other Joes (who wanted the street orphans to end up in American foster care).

In the episode "The Rotten Egg", it is shown in flashbacks that Leatherneck worked at the CEC Military Academy, where he had problems with a tough cadet named Buck McCann. For instance, when the drill instructor witnessed him injuring a fellow cadet with sadistic glee, Leatherneck immediately punished him by giving him 50 laps around the parade ground and withdrawing his recommendation for him for officer candidate school. He also told him the Marine Corps needs men for leaders, not bullies, and told him to get out of his sight before throwing him into the Brig. One night, Leatherneck caught Buck and two men smuggling weapons, but was knocked out during the conflict. Some years later, Leatherneck returns to the military academy only to discover that Buck has taken over the CEC Military Academy (renaming its acronym to Cobra Elite Corps), being served by cadets Mike P. Randall and Sheila McDermott, and has allied himself with Serpentor. Leatherneck is trapped following a hunt on him (where he was knocked out by Sheila despite rescuing her from a river) and Buck leads the cadets to attack the Parris Island Military Academy. Leatherneck escapes and manages to steal one of the Dreadnoks' motorcycles. Upon claiming an outfit from one of Buck's soldiers, Leatherneck helps the Joes fight the soldiers, ending the battle by defeating Buck McCann in single combat.

In "My Favorite Things", Leatherneck is among the Joes participating in a battle at a Dutch museum, where he stops Serpentor from stealing an ax, half of which he keeps as a trophy. Leatherneck later saves a captured Wet-Suit at Vlad Dracula's castle, but is stabbed by a poison dart from Serpentor. His life is eventually saved by a sample of venom from Serpentor's pet cobra obtained by Lifeline and Wet-Suit, although Leatherneck and Wet-Suit quarrel again as they recuperate.

In "Raise the Flagg!", Roadblock, Leatherneck and Wet-Suit scout the sunken USS Flagg, which G.I. Joe plans to salvage along with a crashed Cobra helicarrier contains an antimatter pod, and are taken prisoner alongside Zartan, Zarana and Zandar by an insane Cobra chef named B.A. LaCarre and his B.A.T.s, who force them into labor. The Joes, Dreadnoks and LaCarre eventually put aside their differences and hook the antimatter pod to the helicarrier's rotors, rising them out of the water. While the Joes and LaCarre recover from decompression sickness in a chamber, Leatherneck and Wet-Suit argue over a game of cards.

In "Joe's Night Out", Dial-Tone, Leatherneck and Wet-Suit visit Club Open Air, a new nightclub in town. Dial-Tone also provides dates for himself and the two other Joes, though Leatherneck does not show interest in his date and plays video games instead of dancing with her. Serpentor sends the club into outer space and threatens to activate explosives planted on the club. Leatherneck deactivates the last explosive after Wet-Suit briefly passes out. He and Wet-Suit then convert the club's engines to run on the air within the club, allowing it to return to Earth.

Leatherneck was featured in a PSA where he explains to two girls the horrors of not applying suntan lotion when at the beach.

=== G.I. Joe: The Movie ===
Leatherneck also appeared briefly in the 1987 animated film G.I. Joe: The Movie. An early version of the script features a brief exchange between him and Wet Suit as the Joes are invading Cobra-La.

== Other works ==
Leatherneck's figure is briefly featured in the fiction novel 6 Sick Hipsters. In the story, the character Paul Achting spent four years collecting G.I. Joe figures to set up a battle scene between the Joes and Cobra. As he imagined the characters in his head, he described four of the Joes on front lines of the battle: Hawk, Leatherneck, Wet Suit, and Sci-Fi "stood in procession, weapons raised, adrenaline pumping feverishly. Anxious for another victory over the dreaded Cobra." He described how Leatherneck, "always the traditional soldier, stood just behind Hawk, his gray rifle at his side".
