= Scarlett (G.I. Joe) =

Fictional character from the G.I. Joe franchise

- G.I. Joe character
- Promotional cover B to G.I. Joe Declassified #2
- First appearance: G.I. Joe: A Real American Hero issue #1 (June 1982)
- Voiced by: B. J. Ward (Sunbow); Suzanne Errett-Balcom (DiC); Lisa Ann Beley (Spy Troops and Valor vs. Venom); Amy Birnbaum (Sigma 6 Episodes 1-8); Veronica Taylor (Sigma 6 Episode 9 on); Grey DeLisle (Resolute); Natalia Cigliuti (Renegades); Elizabeth Maxwell (G.I. Joe: Operation Blackout and Smite)

In-universe information
- Affiliation: G.I. Joe
- Specialty: Counter Intelligence
- File name: O'Hara, Shana M.
- Birth place: Atlanta, GA
- SN: RA242967434 (1982); RA24-29-7634 (1993); 624-29-SC34 (2002)
- Rank: E-5 (Sergeant) (1982); E-6 (Staff Sergeant) (1997); E-8 (Master Sergeant) (Devil's Due comics); O-1 (Second Lieutenant) (Renegades); O-4 (Major) (Snake Eyes); O-6 (Colonel) (IDW comics)
- Primary MOS: Intelligence (1982); Counter Intelligence (1993)
- Secondary MOS: CLASSIFIED (1982); Pilot (2008)
- Subgroups: Ninja Force

Scarlett (also released as Agent Scarlett) is a fictional character from the G.I. Joe: A Real American Hero toyline, comic books and animated series. She is one of the original members of the G.I. Joe Team, and debuted in 1982. The character is also featured in both the G.I. Joe: Sigma 6 animated series and comic books. Scarlett was portrayed by actress Rachel Nichols in the 2009 film G.I. Joe: The Rise of Cobra and Samara Weaving in the 2021 film Snake Eyes.

== Profile ==
Her real name is Shana M. O'Hara, and she was born in Atlanta, Georgia. Her primary specialty for the team is counterintelligence. Scarlett is additionally skilled in martial arts and acrobatics. She started training at age 9 with her father and three brothers, who were all instructors, and she earned her first black belt at age 15. Scarlett also graduated summa cum laude, and passed her Bar Exams to practice law before joining the military. She graduated from Advanced Infantry Training and Ranger School and received special education in Covert Ops School, Marine Sniper School, Special Air Service School, and Marine Tae Kwon Do Symposium. Although she is as adept with standard weapons as any of her comrades, her weapon of choice is the XK-1 power crossbow, which fires various bolts with specialized functions. Scarlett is also a qualified expert with the M-14, M-16, M1911A1 Auto Pistol, M79 grenade launcher, M-3A1, M-700 Remington sniper rifle, MAC-10, throwing stars, garotte and KA-BAR (Combat Knife).

Scarlett served as a prominent member of the G.I. Joe Team until it disbanded in 1994. When the team was reinstated, Scarlett was offered a position as a field commander, along with Stalker and Gung-Ho.

She has long red hair, which she tends to put up into a ponytail. In some appearances, she speaks with a southern drawl or localized Georgian accent. Her personal motto is, "Beauty may only be skin deep, but lethal is to the bone".

=== Action Force ===
The Z Force character Quarrel is the European Action Force equivalent of Scarlett. Quarrel was cast as a Swiss diplomat's daughter, and specialized in martial arts. She was again re-characterized in the accompanying Battle Action Force comic books in 1985, this time as "Scarlett". However, her character was cast as a Belgian undercover operative.

== Toys ==
Scarlett was first released as an action figure in 1982. She was the first female action figure in the "A Real American Hero" toyline, making her one of the only figures of that year to have a completely unique mold. Her mold is also unique in that it is the only figure not to have peg holes in the feet. All of the original sixteen figures from 1982 were released with "straight arms". The same figure was re-released in 1983 with "swivel-arm battle grip", which made it easier for figures to hold their rifles and accessories.

A new version of Scarlett was released in 1993 as part of the Ninja Force line. This figure used a synthetic hair material to make her pony tail. Also, all the Ninja Force figures were designed with a "real ninja move". Scarlett's spring-loaded right leg could be pushed back, then released, causing it to spring forward in a kicking motion.

When new G.I. Joe action figures based on the G.I. Joe: A Real American Hero line were released in 2002, Hasbro had failed to renew their trademark claim to the name "Scarlett", and could no longer release the character with that name attached. Therefore, she was released as "Agent Scarlett", and her rank returned to E-5 sergeant.

=== International variants ===
In Argentina, the 1982 mold of Scarlett was recolored blonde with a blue and white uniform, and released as "Glenda".

In Europe, the 1982 mold of Scarlett was re-colored blonde, with a dark green and black uniform, and released as "Quarrel". This figure was part of the Action Force line, and came packaged with the Z-Force RAM Motorcycle (a G.I. Joe Rapid Fire Motorcycle that had been recolored green and black). In 1984, she was again re-painted and re-characterized with the second generation of Action Force, this time as "Scarlett", and released with the third generation AF range. The range was discontinued in Europe in the late 1980s. The G.I. Joe Collectors Club later released an overstock of Quarrel figures, as a promotional give away at the 1992 G.I. Joe Convention.

=== 25th anniversary ===
In 2007, Scarlett was featured in the G.I. Joe team 25th anniversary 5 pack as an intelligence officer, using a new mold heavily based on her first design. She was also released in several different comic packs. In 2008, she was released as a Counter Intelligence officer, with her uniform painted blue and silver, as a homage to Glenda.

=== The Rise of Cobra ===
To coincide with the launch of the movie G.I. Joe: The Rise of Cobra, Hasbro released two figures in July 2009 based on the Scarlett movie character. For both releases, she is listed as Shana "Scarlett" O'Hara. The first, classified as Desert Ambush, features her in the movie style black uniform. The second, classified as Covert Operations, features Scarlett in a camouflage uniform.

The G.I. Joe: Resolute version of Scarlett was released as part of the G.I. Joe Battle Set in 2010. The G.I. Joe: Renegades version of Scarlett was released as an action figure in 2011, as part of the 30th Anniversary line.

=== G.I. Joe Classified Series ===
Q2 of 2020 sees the release of G.I. Joe Classified Series, a new line of highly articulated 6-inch scale action figures that includes prominent characters like Scarlett. This line features premium deco, detailing, articulation, and classic design updated to bring the classic characters into the modern era, plus accessories inspired by each character's rich history.

== Comics ==
=== Marvel Comics ===
Scarlett first appeared in the Marvel Comics series G.I. Joe: A Real American Hero #1 (June 1982).

In a flashback, it was revealed that Scarlett was one of the original members of the Joe team, and one of her first assignments was training the new team in hand-to-hand combat. During one such exercise, Scarlett met Snake Eyes for the first time. While she bested most of the team's members, she recognized that Snake Eyes was a superior fighter, yet had allowed Scarlett to beat him. This had Scarlett intrigued, and they became close rather quickly. Later on a mission into the middle east, Snake Eyes, Scarlett, Rock 'n Roll, and Grunt were sent to save George Strawhacker from Cobra. On the way, a helicopter accident forced the Joes to bail out, but Scarlett was stuck in the burning chopper. Snake Eyes stayed behind to save her. He rescued Scarlett, but a window exploded in his face, scarring him and damaging his vocal cords. Despite his injuries, Snake Eyes convinced Hawk to let him continue with the mission.

Scarlett became a vital member of the G.I. Joe team, even commanding some missions from the very beginning. Scarlett was one of the first Joes to set foot in Springfield, a Cobra-controlled town hidden in the United States. There, a mysterious boy named Billy, who would later be revealed to be Cobra Commander's son, helped them escape. Later, Scarlett was captured by Storm Shadow and taken to Destro's castle in Trans-Carpathia. Soon afterward she was rescued by Snake Eyes, and it was discovered that Storm Shadow was Snake Eyes' friend Tommy Arashikage from Vietnam, and that they had trained in the same ninja clan.

Scarlett led a mission into the nation of Sierra Gordo, when Snake Eyes was captured there by Cobra forces. The Joes were unable to rescue Snake Eyes, and he was taken to the Cobra Consulate in New York. With Storm Shadow's help, Scarlett infiltrated the Consulate and rescued Snake Eyes. Later when Stalker, Snow Job and Quick Kick were thrown into a gulag in the Soviet country of Borovia, Snake Eyes and Scarlett defied orders to rescue Stalker and the others. They faked their own deaths, and went undercover in a circus that was traveling around eastern Europe, posing as acrobats and knife-throwers.

Scarlett is badly injured again, when a vengeful Baroness, who thought Snake Eyes had killed her brother, shot her at point-blank range in the midst of kidnapping Snake Eyes. After she lapses into a coma and doctors proclaim her brain-dead, Scarlett's sister Siobhan obtains a court-order to terminate Scarlett's life-support, but Scarlett eventually recovers from her coma and is reunited with Snake Eyes. The two would continue to serve G.I. Joe, even becoming members of the Ninja Force special team.

Scarlett's next assignment was to pretend she betrayed the Joes and joined Cobra. As part of the cover, she is forced to believe that she has caused the death of Stalker and Hawk, the only Joes who know the truth behind her motivations. While undercover, she takes part in the hunt for Destro and Baroness, and confronts them when Snake Eyes and Storm Shadow rescue the two. To keep up her cover, Snake Eyes impales Scarlett on his sword, but the Cobra ninja Slice realizes that since the wound was not instantly fatal, Snake Eyes had "pulled" his attack and Scarlett was still working for the G.I. Joe team.

Scarlett and Snake Eyes then took some much deserved time off, and stayed at Snake Eyes' cabin in the High Sierras. Unfortunately, they were soon forced back into duty to rescue Storm Shadow, after he is brainwashed by Cobra Commander. Snake Eyes and Scarlett would continue to serve G.I. Joe until its disbandment.

Writer Larry Hama says he always got a lot of positive fan mail from female readers for portraying Scarlett as "a fully competent female soldier" who was "never treated differently from any of the guys," instead of making her a damsel in distress.

=== Devil's Due Publishing ===
==== Scarlett: Declassified ====
This one-shot reveals that before she joined the G.I. Joe team, she was a member of the Army. She was given training above and beyond what a female was allowed to receive at the time, as the generals putting G.I. Joe together wanted a secret weapon that enemies would not suspect. It is revealed that during her time in the CIA she is first given a mini-crossbow, which eventually becomes her weapon of choice. Also, much of her history with martial arts is revealed. Her last mission before joining the G.I. Joe team faces her off against Destro for the first time. It is because of the intelligence that she gathers, as well as her skills, that she is brought into the team.

==== Reinstatement ====
When the team reforms in G.I. Joe: A Real American Hero volume 2, Scarlett signs on as a commander for the Greenshirts. A team led by Roadblock, Scarlett, Snake Eyes, Stalker and Gung-Ho suffers casualties in Florida, as Scarlett and Snake Eyes are taken prisoner by Destro, who is revealed to be Destro's son Alexander masquerading as his father. The Joes are infected with nano-mites, as Hawk sends Kamakura and Spirit to find Cobra Commander's son Billy, who helps them rescue Scarlett and Snake Eyes, and Alexander activates the satellite system. With reinforcements led by Lady Jaye, the Joes defeat Cobra, while Alexander and Mistress Armada are captured by the real Destro. Snake Eyes proposes to Scarlett.

Later, when Cobra Commander is captured, Destro consolidates his power within the Cobra organization, but not before the Commander shoots Hawk in the back. Hawk survives, but General Joseph Colton returns to fill in for Hawk as commander of the team. He send the Joes to New Moon, Colorado to investigate another Cobra front, but after a battle there with Cobra forces, the town is destroyed and G.I. Joe is set up to take the blame. Several Joes are arrested, and the roster is cut severely. Duke and Snake Eyes are rescued by Scarlett and Storm Shadow, as Cobra Commander is freed by the Dreadnoks, and revealed to have been Zartan in disguise.

The Red Shadows organization finally steps forward, targeting members of both G.I. Joe and Cobra. Hawk is targeted, but is rescued from the Red Shadows by Scarlett, Snake Eyes and Kamakura. A G.I. Joe informant is also assassinated by Dela Eden, who escapes from Duke and Flint. Dela attempts to kill Flint, but is stopped by Lady Jaye, who is then stabbed by Dela Eden and dies. Dela is captured by Scarlett, who forms a plan with Flint and Hawk to investigate the Red Shadows organization, while Duke and General Rey interrogate Dela. The Red Shadows rescue Dela, and Scarlett tracks them to New York, where Flint has taken it upon himself to get revenge. Flint refuses to kill Dela, even though he has the opportunity, and the leader of the Red Shadows Wilder Vaughn escapes. G.I. Joe is then deactivated by order of the President, given that Cobra as an organization has fractured, although Cobra Commander remains at large.

==== America's Elite ====
Scarlett is part of a small active roster in G.I. Joe: America's Elite, when the G.I. Joe Team is reactivated to deal with a new threat. Set one year after the end of A Real American Hero, Duke, Scarlett and Snake Eyes all conduct solo investigations, while the rest of the team follows a lead to Puerto Rico. They discover the attacks were made possible by Destro's M.A.R.S. operation and track the signal to Oregon, where they discover that a man named Vance Wingfield is behind the attacks.

Snake Eyes returns, to find that Scarlett has been captured while investigating Cesspool. Unable to authorize a rescue mission for Scarlett, General Colton puts the team on leave from active duty. They discover Scarlett on Destro's submarine in the Pacific Ocean, and succeed in rescuing her, but Destro escapes and Snake Eyes dies during the operation. The Red Ninja Clan, under the control of Sei-Tin, steals Snake Eyes' body in order to resurrect him. The Joes track the Red Ninjas to China, where they eventually defeat Sei-Tin and return Snake Eyes to normal. Snake Eyes renounces his ninja background and returns to his "commando" persona, much to Scarlett's concern. Scarlett is part of a special mission to Antarctica, which includes Snake Eyes, Stalker, and Duke, as well as reservists Snow Job, Frostbite, and Iceberg.

During the events of World War III, when General Colton responds to a threat from Cobra Commander by launching missions to capture all Cobra agents still at large, Snake Eyes and Scarlett capture Vypra, and later capture Firefly in Japan. The main team reunites in Priest Lake, Idaho, where the Joes find out about a plan by Cobra Commander to blow up nukes in the Amazon and Antarctica. The team splits up, and deactivate the nukes in both locations. Cobra Commander and The Plague retreat to a secret base in the Appalachian Mountains, where the first Cobra soldiers were trained. When the Joes attack the Appalachian base, the battle ends when Hawk tackles Cobra Commander, and knocks him out with a punch to the face. In the aftermath, the Joes are still active and fully funded.

Hasbro later announced that all stories published by Devil's Due Publishing are no longer considered canonical, and are now considered an alternate continuity.

==== Alternate continuities ====
===== G.I. Joe Reloaded =====
G.I. Joe: Reloaded has a drastically different approach to G.I. Joe's creation. Scarlett is still working with her father and brothers, when he receives a mysterious package and is killed by the poisonous contents. She later joins the new team, and eventually leads the team in its final mission to liberate Hawaii after Cobra takes it over, before the U.S. Army bombs the state. In this reality, Snake Eyes is not a member of G.I. Joe, but is seen to pine after Scarlett from afar.

===== G.I. Joe vs. Transformers =====
This series published by Devil's Due, is composed of four mini-series that chronicle a new origin to the G.I. Joe team, which is formed as a special missions team to defend Earth against Cobra, who has Cybertronian technology. As part of this, Scarlett is one of the few Joes who operates a giant mecha robot of her own. In the third miniseries, Scarlett is shown to have a relationship with Snake Eyes. She is briefly shown in the fourth mini-series as still being a member of the G.I. Joe team.

=== IDW Publishing ===
In 2009, IDW Publishing took over the G.I. Joe license and launched a new series of G.I. Joe comics.

In the IDW Publishing continuity, Scarlett was one of the first Joes, working alongside Duke on her debut mission. In the present day, she has been promoted to colonel.

== Animated series ==
=== Sunbow ===
Scarlett appeared in the original G.I. Joe animated series, voiced by actress B. J. Ward. Scarlett first appeared in "The MASS Device" mini-series. She was portrayed as the typical tough female member of the team, intelligent and strong-willed.

Scarlett was featured in one of the series' Public Service Announcements, telling a girl not to give up on learning how to water ski.

==== G.I. Joe: The Movie ====
Like many of the characters from the previous seasons, Scarlett appeared briefly in the 1987 animated film G.I. Joe: The Movie. She is present in the battles over the Broadcast Energy Transmitter (B.E.T.). She is also seen holding a critically injured Duke when he falls into a coma.

=== DiC ===
Scarlett first made a cameo appearance in the first season of DiC's G.I. Joe episode "The Mind Mangler" part of Duke's flashback memories. She was primarily featured in a variation of her 1982 outfit, in a different color scheme. In the second season DIC series, she had major roles in the following episodes: "Chunnel," "The Sword," "Long Live Rock and Roll" (two-parter), "Messenger from the Deep," and "Shadow of a Doubt", voiced by Suzanne Errett-Balcom.

=== Direct to video movies ===
Scarlett was a member of the G.I. Joe team in both direct-to-video movies, G.I. Joe: Spy Troops and G.I. Joe: Valor vs. Venom. These movies are more associated with the continuity in Sigma Six, and do not seem to have any direct ties to previous animated continuity. In Spy Troops, Scarlett serves as a second in command to the team. She is taken hostage by Zartan when he steals a helicopter. She is later rescued by Snake Eyes and the team. In both movies, Scarlett is voiced by Lisa Ann Beley.

=== G.I. Joe: Resolute ===
The G.I. Joe: Resolute series departs from recent depictions of futuristic technology, adopting a more "realistic" take on the franchise. In the series, it is indicated that Scarlett has had romantic partnerships in the past with both Duke and Snake Eyes. Scarlett is voiced by Grey DeLisle.

=== G.I. Joe: Renegades ===
In G.I. Joe: Renegades, Scarlett is voiced by Natalia Cigliuti. She is a commissioned officer with the rank of Second Lieutenant rather than a Sergeant as in other continuities, and works in Army Intelligence. Her position in Army Intelligence was originally a desk-bound information processing analyst which caused her to study and practice ninjistu to prove herself capable of actual field work. Her detailed information background supports the team well. Her first field assignment results in her and her associates finding out the truth of Cobra and becoming the Renegades. Her ninja teacher Snake Eyes follows her once she is forced on the run.

In the episode "Revelations, Part 1", it was revealed that her father Patrick O'Hara was a former worker for Cobra Industries, who perished in an explosion that he caused, to keep Cobra Industries from using his MASS Device for their own purposes. Following an encounter with her father's ghost, Scarlett revisits her father's home in Atlanta, where she learns the truth about her father's demise from Snake Eyes. It is revealed that the red stone in Scarlett's locket plays a key in Cobra Industries' plot to activate the MASS Device. When the Bio-Vipers attacked the house, Scarlett is knocked out by Baroness who swipes Scarlett's locket. In "Revelations, Part 2", Scarlett learns that Snake Eyes had briefly met her father, and promised him to look after his daughter.

In an interview with writer Henry Gilroy, Gilroy stated that the relationship between Scarlett and Snake Eyes would be evolving as the series progresses.

== Sigma 6 ==
In the series, G.I. Joe: Sigma 6, Scarlett is a counter intelligence specialist, helicopter pilot, and second in command to Duke. This version of Scarlett appears younger (although that may be due to the anime-influenced art style of Sigma 6). Scarlett also appears to have a rougher edge, as she explains that she hasn't worn a dress since senior prom. She was voiced by Amy Birnbaum for the first 8 episodes, but was later voiced by Veronica Taylor.

Sigma 6 was also a 6 issue mini-series released by Devils Due, with direct connection to the animated TV series. Like the animated TV series, this comic line does not tie into the continuity of the original G.I. Joe universe. Scarlett appears as the main star of issue #4, where she is pitted against the Baroness.

Although she is a member of the Sigma 6 team in the animated series, Scarlett was not made as a figure for the 8 inch toyline. She was released in 2006 as a member of the 2 1/2-inch figure line with a helicopter in the "Mission: Copter Countdown" set.

== Live-action film ==
Scarlett
- G.I. Joe character
- Rachel Nichols as Scarlett in G.I. Joe: The Rise of Cobra.
- First appearance: 2009
- Portrayed by: Rachel Nichols
- Voiced by: Leigh-Allyn Baker

In-universe information
- Affiliation: G.I. Joe
- Specialty: Intelligence Specialist
- File name: Shana O'Hara
- Birth place: Atlanta, Georgia
- SN: 624-29-SC34
- Rank: E-5 (Sergeant)
- Series: G.I. Joe: The Rise of Cobra

=== G.I. Joe: The Rise of Cobra ===
Rachel Nichols portrays Scarlett in the live-action film G.I. Joe: The Rise of Cobra. In the movie, Scarlett graduated from college at age 12 and became the team's intelligence expert. She left school so early, she does not understand men's attraction to her. Her preferred weapon is a 15P laser-guided, solid alloy compound crossbow with scope.

Scarlett is part of the team that rescues Duke and Ripcord, after their convoy is ambushed by the Baroness. During Duke and Ripcord's training for G.I. Joe membership, Scarlett oversees their shooting test. Ripcord makes advances toward her, but she rebuffs them, even telling him that attractions are emotions which are not based in science and that in her mind, if something cannot be quantified or proven as existing, it does not.

During Cobra's attack on The Pit, Scarlett fights the Baroness, who knocks her out and steals the nanomite warheads. She assists in pursuit of the Baroness and Storm Shadow in Paris. The motorcycle she drives is destroyed during the chase, but Ripcord saves her. After Cobra destroys the Eiffel Tower with a nanomite warhead, Scarlett, Ripcord, Heavy Duty and Breaker are arrested by French authorities who incorrectly believe they were responsible.

After the Joes locate M.A.R.S Industries leader James McCullen's secret base and fly there, Scarlett infiltrates the base along with Breaker and Snake Eyes. She helps Ripcord track down and destroy the M.A.R.S warheads and returns her feelings by kissing him. Following the Joes' victory over Cobra, Scarlett confesses her feelings toward Ripcord, and joins the other Joes for their next mission.

In G.I. Joe: Operation H.I.S.S., the comic sequel to the film, Scarlett is kidnapped by Cobra. Snake Eyes is concerned and goes to rescue her.

=== Snake Eyes ===
Scarlett
- G.I. Joe character
- First appearance: 2021
- Portrayed by: Samara Weaving

In-universe information
- Affiliation: G.I. Joe
- Specialty: Intelligence Specialist
- File name: Shana O'Hara
- Birth place: Atlanta, Georgia
- SN: 624-29-SC34
- Rank: O-4 (Major)
- Series: Snake Eyes

Scarlett is portrayed by Samara Weaving in 2021 film Snake Eyes, which is set in an alternate continuity. She is a Major in the U.S. Special Forces working covert operations and is called in by Tommy Arashikage for backup when the latter learns that Cobra agent Kenta is in Japan plotting war against the Arashikage Clan. Scarlett tells Tommy that she has been spying on the Baroness, an old friend of hers, and informs him of Baroness' terrorist activities. Scarlett arrives as Kenta is attacking the clan, and fights the Baroness, before they form a brief alliance after Kenta betrays the Baroness. Kenta is eventually defeated through the combined efforts of Scarlett, the Arashikage Clan, Snake Eyes and Baroness. After the battle, Scarlett reveals to Snake Eyes that his father was G.I. Joe, and recruits him to her cause.

== In other media ==
Scarlett is one of the featured characters in the 1985 G.I. Joe: A Real American Hero computer game. She is also featured as a playable character in the 1992 G.I. Joe arcade game. Scarlett appears as a playable character in the video game G.I. Joe: The Rise of Cobra and G.I. Joe: Operation Blackout.

Scarlett appears in the Community episode "G.I. Jeff", voiced by Mary-McDonald Lewis.

== Notes ==
- Bellomo, Mark (2009). The Ultimate Guide to G.I. Joe 1982-1994: Identification and Price Guide (2nd ed.). Iola, Wisconsin: Krause Publications. ISBN 9780896899223.
