= Zartan =

Character from the G.I. Joe franchise

- G.I. Joe character
- First appearance: G.I. Joe: A Real American Hero issue #25 (July 1984)
- Voiced by: Zack Hoffman (Sunbow/Marvel); Marc Thompson (Sigma 6); Steve Blum (Resolute); Brian Bloom (Renegades); Chris McCann (G.I. Joe: Operation Blackout)

In-universe information
- Affiliation: Cobra
- Specialty: Master of Disguise
- File name: UNKNOWN (Aliases too numerous to list)
- Birth place: UNKNOWN (his third filecard states that it is Nice, France, but later filecards ignore it).
- Primary MOS: Infiltration
- Secondary MOS: Espionage
- Subgroups: Dreadnoks; Ninja Force

Zartan is a fictional character from the G.I. Joe: A Real American Hero toyline, comic books, and animated series. He is one of the main villains in the franchise as the leader of the Dreadnoks, and a mercenary who often worked directly for Cobra Commander. His character was voiced by Zack Hoffman in the 1985 TV series, and he was portrayed by Arnold Vosloo in the live-action film G.I. Joe: The Rise of Cobra and its 2013 sequel, G.I. Joe: Retaliation.

== Profile ==
Zartan is renowned for his mastery of make-up and disguise. Very little is known of his background, but he is suspected to have received European military academy training at St. Cyr. Zartan can alter his skin color at will to blend in with his environment, and is a practitioner of several mystic martial arts. He is also a ventriloquist, a polyglot (speaking over 20 languages and dialects), and an acrobatic-contortionist.

Zartan and the Dreadnoks have also been known to use holographic technology and other means to disguise themselves. He has a younger brother and sister, twins named Zandar and Zarana, as well as a daughter named Zanya.

The Dreadnoks are a fictional biker gang from the G.I. Joe: A Real American Hero toyline, comic books, and cartoon series. They are affiliated with Cobra as shock troops, offering their mercenary services as subordinates of Zartan.

== Toys ==
When Zartan was originally released in the toy line, it stated on his file card that he suffered from paranoid schizophrenia and multiple personality disorder. After a complaint from a mental health organization, Hasbro removed this information from the file for later print runs, and was not referenced on file cards for future releases of the character. In early development, he was called Captain Chameleon. He was later named Zartan, an anagram of Tarzan, by writer Larry Hama.

=== Vintage ===
The 1984 Zartan action figure featured UV reactive plastic. In its natural state, Zartan appeared white, but when exposed to sunlight, Zartan's skin changed to a dark blue. The action figure also came with thermal sensitive stickers that were applied to Zartan's chest- and thigh-armor. These stickers changed from maroon when cold, to aqua at room temperature, and blue when hot. Zartan was sold with an accompanying "swamp skier" called the Chameleon, which also contained thermal reactive plastic. The Chameleon could be disassembled into several parts and loaded into a small cart that was included with the action figure; the cart, loaded with the vehicle's parts, would act as part of a disguise, making Zartan appear to be a parts or junk dealer. A small face mask, included in a detachable backpack, completed the disguise. The action figures for Zartan's brother Zandar and sister Zarana were also constructed of the same UV reactive plastic.

Zartan was updated in 1993, as part of the Ninja Force line. A complete departure from his classic uniform, Zartan wore a leather jacket and neon green pants. Instead of a cowl, he wears a short orange mohawk on his otherwise bald head. All the Ninja Force figures were designed with a "real ninja move". Zartan was designed with a spring-action hip; if Zartan's right arm was pushed back, his upper torso turned right. When the arm was let go, the torso sprang back forward, resulting in a punching motion with the right arm.

After the line was canceled in 1994, Hasbro made several attempts to resurrect A Real American Hero through repaint series. Zartan was released only once in this four-year period (1997–2001) at the tail-end. Because of difficulty obtaining the original mold, Hasbro compromised, and repainted the 1990 SAW-Viper body with a modified Zartan head. Although true to the classic look, both this figure and the Ninja Force release are unpopular reinterpretations of the character.

=== Modern ===
When Hasbro revamped the Real American Hero toyline in 2002, Zartan made an appearance as a figure again. Zartan sports his trademark hood and an open vested shirt. This figure was offered with a variety of paint schemes including with disguises in the Spy Troops line.

In 2004, Zartan was redesigned again for Valor vs. Venom. Trading his hood for a ski cap, Zartan is the furthest from his biker roots here, retaining only the recognizable face markings to make him stand out.

=== Sigma 6 figures ===
In a new 8" scale, Sigma 6 figures were heavily stylized and inspired by Japanese anime. Zartan released in the "Commando" collection in 2006, featuring his Sigma 6 outfit. A repaint of this figure was released in 2007, featuring a new version of Zartan called "Toxic Zartan" featuring a new purple uniform, and green highlights.

=== 25th Anniversary ===
2007 was the anniversary of the launch of G.I. Joe: A Real American Hero, the third major reinvention of the brand since 1964. To celebrate, Hasbro created new figures based on the A Real American Hero line, featuring modern sculpting with updated and increased articulation (including the replacement of 's trademark O-Ring construction). Zartan was unveiled at the 2007 San Diego Comic-Con, and the figure, based on designs from the Devil's Due comic series, included a removable mask and also changes color like its 1980s counterpart. A second 25th Anniversary-era figure, more closely hewing to the original figure from 1984, was released in 2008 that does not change color, but came with a scaled down version of the Chameleon swamp skier and two removable masks. Zartan was also released on the Hall of Heroes Line to commemorate the 25th anniversary figures. He came with three face masks, his trademark pistol and a sniper rifle.

=== Pursuit of Cobra ===
Zartan was released in the second wave of figures for the Pursuit of Cobra line in 2010. In a review of the action figure, MTV said that Zartan "one of the few JOE-verse characters that weren't stripped of all their coolness in the recent film", though still praised the action figure for not referencing the film, calling the figure "all-around amazing".

== Comic series ==
=== Marvel Comics ===

Zartan first appeared in issue #24 of the Marvel Comics series. He was fully introduced in : A Real American Hero #25 (July 1984). Zartan can imitate anyone he wishes to an exact physical and vocal likeness.

Zartan was featured in issue #48, where he had been brought into The Pit, the Joe's Headquarters, disguised as an injured Joe, Ripcord. He almost escapes, by impersonating various Joes, such as Doc, Tripwire, General Hawk and Gung-Ho. Zartan is confronted by Sgt. Slaughter while impersonating Gung-Ho, as the real Gung-Ho is standing next to him. Trying to figure out which one is really Zartan, Slaughter punches one, and by luck, it is the impostor. Zartan eventually does escape, with the help of the Dreadnoks. This leads to Cobra Commander's assault, which destroys the Pit.

Zartan is famous for delivering the killing blow to Serpentor during the Cobra Civil War, by shooting the Cobra emperor in the eye, with the same longbow that he used to kill the Hard Master years ago. After the war, Zartan leaves Cobra and the Dreadnoks, while his sister continues to work with Cobra. Zartan disguises himself as the Arashikage Blind Master, in order to mentor a boy named Tyrone. He eventually returns to Cobra Island, along with Billy, Captain Minh, and Tyrone, to expose Fred VII as an impostor pretending to be Cobra Commander. The mission is interrupted by the return of the real Cobra Commander, who traps Billy, Zartan, Fred VII, Tyrone, Captain Minh, Raptor, and several others in a landlocked freighter, which he then buries under a volcano. After several months of digging, Billy and Zartan manage to escape, while most of the others die from tainted food.

=== Action Force ===
Zartan also faced off against Shipwreck in the UK Action Force series.

=== Devil's Due ===
Devil's Due comics expanded on Zartan's origin and introduced his daughter, Zanya. Zartan and his siblings, Zandar and Zarana, grew up sometime during the early 1970s. As a child, he was diagnosed with an unknown mental health condition requiring medication. They were raised by their French actress mother and movie-mask sculptor father. They grew up in a broken home with a temperamental father.

Sometime after he began working as an assassin and mercenary, using his disguise abilities. Zartan also worked for a government agency under the name Amauri Sanderson. He underwent a top-secret French genetic experiment, which infused him with chameleon DNA, giving him the ability to blend into his background. During an arms deal with Destro, Amauri Sanderson met the leader of a motorcycle gang who was the original Zartan. Amauri joined the Dreadnoks and reunited with Zandar and Zarana. He was later approached by several Dreadnoks for the purpose of overthrowing the leader, who considered all the members expendable. When the insurrection was exposed, the leader planned to have Amauri executed by dismemberment. Zandar and Zarana incited a rival gang to attack, which gave them the opportunity to free their brother. The traitorous Dreadnoks teamed up with the rival gang, and Amauri fought and overpowered the leader and his rivals. With no one left to back him up, the leader was killed by Buzzer, Torch, and Ripper, and Amauri assumed the identity of Zartan.

=== IDW ===
Zartan is introduced in Origins. He was orphaned as a young boy, and made his way by pickpockets on the street. When he was confronted by the local police, he gave them the name "Zartan" that he saw on a movie poster behind them, eventually adopting it at the beginning of his named career. Years later, Zartan is a Cobra agent answering directly to the Baroness. He was tasked with infiltrating a presidential airliner, to ensure the continued cooperation of President Rumanapar. His mission is a success, and he contacts Baroness for extraction. Displeased with Zartan, Baroness sends him to be a test subject for Destro's teleportation device. Destro sends him to assassinate Nico Mandirobilis; however, the teleportation process was not finalized, and Zartan's body quickly disintegrated.

With Zartan's complete genetic map stored in the M.A.S.S.' Relay Star Satellites, Cobra geneticist Doctor Taggac was able to brew a plasmid medium, which injected into a blank clone body, reformatted the slug into a copy of Zartan. The body was corrupt, with unstable skin lividity, numerous cancers, renal failure and more. Taggac used bio-magnetic pads to stabilize the body, and began teaching Zartan how to live again. This instruction included both physical elements and basic language and math skills. Zartan's unique biology gave him the ability to change his appearance and skin tone, a skill which Taggac attempted to keep secret from Cobra. Eventually the magnetic pads were surgically implanted beneath the skin, giving him a normal appearance. He expressed a desire to leave the lab and go to the outside world, and days later he kills a guard and poses as wait staff, to escape before anyone notices he was gone.

Cobra agents track him using a subcutaneous transmitter, but he evades them, fakes his own death, and sneaks back into the lab. He pulls a gun on Taggac, and forces him to contact Cobra Commander. Zartan negotiates his services as an assassin, and when the terms are agreed upon, he kills Taggac.

Zartan later reappeared in IDW's reboot of Mobile Armoured Strike Kommand. Here, he identifies as "Emil Zartan" and infiltrates the MASK team to steal their technology so he can sell it.

== Animated series ==
=== Sunbow ===
Zartan appeared in the original G.I. Joe animated series. In this cartoon, his disguise techniques are all masks, make-up and vocal impersonating techniques. Zartan is also initially able to change the color of his skin to perfectly blend in with his background. Zartan's camouflage abilities are negated by the sun, causing his skin to turn blue (much like his action figure), and weakening him significantly. However, both aspects were dropped almost immediately after the first season began. "Jungle Trap" was the last episode to showcase this particular ability. Zartan was usually loyal to Cobra Commander and had a rivalry with Destro, who considered Zartan a petty criminal. He was also a more cowardly character, often fleeing battle when things turned against him.

He first appeared in the mini-series "The Revenge of Cobra", along with Dreadnoks Buzzer, Ripper and Torch. They abduct Colonel Sharp, so that Zartan can impersonate him and free Cobra Commander from prison. Zartan and the Dreadnoks recover a piece of Destro's Weather Dominator, offering to sell it to the highest bidder, Cobra or G.I. Joe.

Zartan had a prominent role in the first-season episode "Countdown for Zartan", in which he impersonates a French scientist and places a bomb within a defense center, where scientists from all over the world are meeting. He is exposed and imprisoned there by the Joes, who then search for the bomb. Zartan is pressured into giving its location by watching the time on his watch running out, allowing the Joes to disable the bomb in time. Zartan also had major roles in "The Synthoid Conspiracy", in which he creates the Synthoids, with which he helps Cobra replace Duke and several other G.I. Joe military commanders; and in "Cold Slither", in which he and the Dreadnoks form a heavy metal band in a Cobra plot.

In the second season, he expanded the Dreadnoks to include his younger siblings, Zarana and Zandar, as well as Monkeywrench and Thrasher. As part of Doctor Mindbender's plot to create Serpentor, Zartan stole the DNA of Aztec Emperor Montezuma, but his loyalty to Cobra Commander remained even after Serpentor took control of Cobra.

==== G.I. Joe: The Movie ====
In G.I. Joe: The Movie, Zartan is seen being angry with Cobra Commander, for blaming his lacking courage on the troops. Zartan is given a valuable gem by Pythona of Cobra-La, so that he and his Dreadnoks will aid them in freeing Serpentor. They accomplish their task, but Zartan himself is absent from then on, and is not seen during the final battle at the film's climax.

=== Spy Troops ===
Zartan appeared in the direct-to-video CGI animated movie G.I. Joe: Spy Troops, voiced by Colin Murdock.

=== G.I. Joe: Sigma 6 ===
Zartan appeared in G.I. Joe: Sigma 6. His disguise techniques are due to hologram generators in his suit.

=== Resolute ===
Zartan makes two appearances in the G.I. Joe: Resolute series. He first appears in a flashback at the beginning of the series, where he injures Snake Eyes, and assassinates the Hard Master. He later appears near the end of the series, where he is leading a security force guarding a Cobra base. He manages to corner Duke and Scarlett, when Scarlett gives him the option to just leave, as Zartan is only a mercenary and not part of Cobra. Zartan refuses, saying that he enjoys killing people, as he aims to kill Scarlett, Duke shoots him in the back.

It is unknown if this version of Zartan leads the Dreadnoks as they don't appear nor was mentioned in the series.

=== Renegades ===
Zartan first appears in the G.I. Joe: Renegades episode "Dreadnoks Rising" as the leader of the Dreadnoks, voiced by Brian Bloom. He reappears in "Knockoffs" and "Cutting Edge." While having a talent of impersonating people's voices, Zartan and his Dreadnoks have been terrorizing a local town, even capturing a local waitress named Wendy, causing Snake-Eyes to go rescue her. The other G.I. Joe members teach the town how to stand up to Zartan and the Dreadnoks. When the Dreadnoks present the captured Snake-Eyes bound in chains, Zartan fights the Joes. Zartan is taken down a notch when Snake-Eyes easily escapes at the right moment, and uses the chains as a weapon. Zartan is tackled by Sheriff Terry, who manages to defeat Zartan and arrest him. When Flint and Lady Jaye arrive in town to arrest Duke's team, they end up capturing Zartan and his Dreadnoks.

In "Knockoffs," Flint and Lady Jaye use Zartan to help them track down the Joes. He has Flint lend him a GPS, since he had a tracer on the motorcycle that Snake-Eyes stole from him. During the conflict between a Cobra transport, the Joes, and the Falcons, Zartan knocks out Lady Jaye and makes his way into a Cobra Van, where he equips himself with a chameleon-type wrist device. This outfits him in a suit (resembling the one used in the other cartoons), which will enable him to mask his appearance, by taking the form of anyone it scans. Zartan uses it to take the Cobra van and to get away from Flint. During the conflict, he tried to dispose of Scarlett by disguising himself as Duke. When the real Duke arrives, Snake-Eyes takes down Zartan, as his heartbeat is different from Duke's. Scarlett touches the suit, which results in a surge that leaves black burns around Zartan's eyes as she removes it. Zartan is taken back to prison while Baroness takes the chameleon mold to Cobra Commander. Due to the device acquiring the DNA of the first wearer, as part of the chameleon mold's "fail safe imprinting feature", Baroness ends up visiting Zartan in jail, where she makes a "get out of jail" offer that Zartan accepts.

In "Cutting Edge," Zartan posed as Cobra Commander in order to fool Jinx when she was hired to assassinate Cobra Commander.

== Live action films ==
Zartan
- G.I. Joe character
- First appearance: 2009
- Portrayed by: Arnold Vosloo (Original); Jonathan Pryce (Disguised as the US President)

In-universe information
- Affiliation: Cobra
- Specialty: Master of Disguise
- File name: Classified
- Series: G.I. Joe: The Rise of Cobra; G.I. Joe: Retaliation

Zartan is played by Arnold Vosloo in Stephen Sommers's film G.I. Joe: The Rise of Cobra, with a drastically different appearance than his television counterpart. He is a master of disguise, able to mimic other peoples' mannerisms and characteristics. Sent by McCullen with the Baroness and Storm Shadow, Zartan breaks into the Pit and disguises himself as a G.I. Joe Pit member. He murders Cover Girl with a knife as she reports to General Hawk, taking them by surprise. When the two Cobra agents fight their way out soon after, Zartan takes an alternate route and kills off a nearby Bedouin, donning his clothing to escape detection by Pit members.

Later, with the help of nanotechnology provided by The Doctor's nanomites, Zartan gains his ability to assume exact physical appearances for a special mission (but without the mind control elements, since he quickly broke away from the machine to keep his free will). During the final battle, Zartan is sent to America using the missile crisis as a cover, where he infiltrates the White House as part of Cobra's plans for world domination, and assumes the identity of the President of the United States. Several times in the film, he whistles the tune "For He's a Jolly Good Fellow", including at the end of the film, confirming that he has taken the place of the President.

Vosloo reprises his role as Zartan in the 2013 sequel G.I. Joe: Retaliation, with a much larger role. According to Vosloo, Zartan is still in disguise as the U.S. President and he has the world leaders all under his thumb, war heads headed towards innocent populaces, and some new heavies on the payroll, to keep G.I. Joe at bay. Zartan orders air strikes on the G.I. Joes, killing a majority of them. He is later revealed to have been the one who killed the Hard Master and raised Storm Shadow as a ruthless assassin. Zartan is eventually killed by his former student, at which time his guise as the President finally fades.

== Video games ==
Zartan is one of the featured villains in the 1985 G.I. Joe: A Real American Hero computer game.

== In other media ==
- Zartan has been featured in episodes of Robot Chicken. He first appears in "Joint Point." He returns in "More Blood, More Chocolate" voiced by Seth Green and "P.S. Yes, In That Way."
- Zartan is mentioned in the Jamie Madrox song "Hey Phatty".
- Zartan appeared in the 2009 parody video The Ballad of G.I. Joe, portrayed by Billy Crudup.
