= Roadblock (G.I. Joe) =

Fictional character from the G.I. Joe franchise

- G.I. Joe character
- First appearance: G.I. Joe: A Real American Hero issue #22 (April 1984)
- Voiced by: Kene Holliday (Sunbow); Blu Mankuma (DiC); Steve Blum (Resolute); Kevin Michael Richardson (Renegades); Dave Fennoy (G.I. Joe: Operation Blackout)

In-universe information
- Affiliation: G.I. Joe
- Specialty: Heavy Machine Gunner
- File name: Marvin F. Hinton
- Birth place: Biloxi, Mississippi
- SN: RA538203485 (original); 434-2390-WT27 (1992); 825-38-MF48 (2003)
- Rank: E-4 (Corporal) (1984–1985); E-5 (Sergeant) (1988); E-6 (Staff Sergeant) (1992); E-7 (Sergeant First Class) (comic book series)
- Primary MOS: Infantry Heavy Weapons
- Secondary MOS: Cook
- Subgroups: Tiger Force; Star Brigade; Night Force; Anti-Venom Task Force

Roadblock is a fictional character from the G.I. Joe: A Real American Hero toy line, comic books, and animated series. He is the G.I. Joe Team's Heavy Machine Gunner and debuted in 1984. Roadblock is one of the most prominent African Americans in the series. He is portrayed by Dwayne Johnson in the 2013 film G.I. Joe: Retaliation.

== Profile ==
Roadblock's real name is Marvin F. Hinton. He was born in Biloxi, Mississippi and grew up with an extended family. His primary function in G.I. Joe is as a heavy machine gunner and his secondary function is as a cook.

Despite being a Boy Scout and singing in the church choir, Roadblock is shy. Before he enlisted in the U.S. Army, Roadblock wanted to be a gourmet chef, and was working as a bouncer to earn enough money to attend Escoffier School in France. An army recruiter convinced him that he could learn to be a chef in the Army. After enlisting, Roadblock found Army food appalling, and transferred to infantry where he excelled at using heavy weapons. Roadblock is one of the most physically strong members of G.I. Joe, able to carry a fully loaded M2 Browning machine gun as a personal weapon. A M2 Browning machine gun can weigh up to 134 lbs, and usually requires a dedicated squad to transport and operate. Despite working in infantry, he still maintains his passion for making good food, and indulges in it while engaging in his secondary duty. He is a qualified expert with the M2 Browning .50 cal heavy machine gun, all Warsaw Pact heavy machine guns, M-16, and the M-1911A1 auto pistol.

When the G.I. Joe team temporarily disbanded, Roadblock finally took the opportunity to become a gourmet chef. He wrote several cookbooks that became best-sellers, endorsed a line of cooking products under his name, and briefly hosted his own television cooking show. However, when the team was reinstated, he happily hung up his chef's hat and rejoined them once again, staying on when the team was re-activated with a reduced roster.

In the UK Action Force toy series, Roadblock is originally from the French Congo. As the Action Force and G.I. Joe toy lines merged, his profile altered to the American variant.

In the animated series, Roadblock is inexplicably depicted as speaking in rhyme. He has a cousin named Heavy Duty.

== Toys ==
Roadblock was first released as an action figure in 1984. A second version of the figure was released in 1986, and the original figure was repainted and released as part of the "Tiger Force" line in 1988. A new version of Roadblock was released in 1992. This figure was repainted and released as part of the "Battle Corps" line in 1993. Another new version of Roadblock was also released in 1993 as part of the Star Brigade line, which was repainted and re-released in 1994.

Additionally, G.I. Joe issued a 12-inch Roadblock action figure for the 1992 Hall of Fame series that brought back the 12-inch G.I. Joe action figures. After that, G.I. Joe issued two other versions of the 12-inch Roadblock. Roadblock's head is bald, and his face has a mustache, though some versions have a small goatee on the chin. An action figure called Double Blast used one of the Roadblock molds causing fear in fans that Hasbro lost the rights to Roadblock's name. Hasbro released a figure named Roadblock with Double Blast's information and real name on the file card. All other versions of Roadblock have been remakes of the original.

== Comics ==
=== Marvel Comics ===
Unlike the cartoon version, the comic book Roadblock does not speak in rhymes, and is mentioned to have a fierce temper that "Is a long time building, and a long time going". He has been known to say things like "Flush 'em out with a burst of fifty 'cal", meaning force enemies out into the open with concentrated fire from his .50 caliber machine gun.

Roadblock first appeared in Marvel Comics' G.I. Joe: A Real American Hero #22 (April 1984). In that issue, he is standing guard with Duke. They are overlooking the funeral of General Flagg, which is taking place at Arlington National Cemetery. Cobra attacks the funeral with a Rattler plane. Before anyone is hurt, Roadblock and Duke shoot it down, killing the pilot.

In the next issue, Roadblock is part of a Joe team attempting to keep Cobra Commander prisoner in the Rocky Mountains. The ninja Storm Shadow manages to rescue the Commander, though he himself is captured by Roadblock.

In issue #69, while in an American embassy that is being looted, Roadblock threatens a man who is intending to burn an American flag. Roadblock aims his weapon at the man's head, asking him to "Desist in your actions or I will be obliged to reduce your head to a fine red mist." When the threatened man points out how looters are stealing typewriters, Roadblock states that "Nobody ever died for a typewriter." To which the man backed down.

In issues #77 and #78, he and other Joes battle American agents who are trying to frame and arrest every single G.I. Joe member. Roadblock is originally captured along with Hawk and ally General Hollingsworth. He violently escapes from captivity in order to organize the resistance movement. He manages to organize a group of Joe allies, along with the unexpected assistance of Destro, temporarily halting the conspiracy.

In another incident, detailed in the Secret Missions series, Roadblock and Chuckles escort a Harvard-educated African prince back to his homeland, to help him stabilize a power struggle. Despite the Joes' assistance in saving the prince's life (who is a capable fighter in his own right), the man evicts all foreign embassies from his land.

In issue #145, Roadblock is chosen to go into space with the Star Brigade; a small team of Joe members. They travel on board the Joes' own space shuttle; the Defiant. The team fights rampaging robots inside an asteroid that threatens all of Earth. The Joes, along with the Oktober Guard, destroy the asteroid, saving billions of lives.

Issue #154 is a Roadblock story in which, on his way to a cooking competition, he ends up on a civilian plane loaded with Cobra Vipers. Roadblock acquires a rocket launcher from the cargo hold, parachutes out of the plane, and destroys it with the weapon.

=== IDW Publishing ===
In a direct continuation of the original Marvel Comics series, still written by Larry Hama, Cobra is a worldwide popular paramilitary strike force and G.I. Joe is on the run. Roadblock kills a Cobra assassination team and hooks up with other Joes to steal proof for the United States President that Cobra is acting against America's interests.

=== Devil's Due Comics ===
The Joe team spends much time inactive. When Cobra is revealed to be a threat yet again, Roadblock, now making a living as a chef, eagerly answers the call to reform the team. He is one of those stricken by the nanite virus but recovers.

Roadblock gains his own television cooking show. It ends up that Tomax and Xamot, Cobra operatives, own the show; they decide to have the studios destroyed to cover up money laundering crimes. Roadblock ends up fighting overeager Dreadnoks on stage, which just increases his popularity, including sales of his Marvin Hinton Grill.

In the alternate continuity of Devil's Due G.I. Joe Versus Transformers, Roadblock is one of the few Joes to pilot large, humanoid robots. They befriend and team up with the Autobots to stop a conspiracy happening literally below their own headquarters.

== Animated series ==
=== Sunbow ===
Roadblock appeared in various episodes of the original G.I. Joe animated series, voiced by Kene Holliday. Roadblock is the most prominent African American character in the animated series. He frequently talks in rhymes and has a talent for cooking. Roadblock is one of the most good-natured of the Joes, both in and out of combat situations and is a very capable leader when the situation calls for it. He is particularly good friends with Flint and Lady Jaye.

Roadblock first appeared in the miniseries "The Revenge of Cobra", in which he had a major role. He is among the Joes led by Flint to rescue Duke and Snake Eyes, as well as to retrieve a laser core from Cobra. However, Destro creates a storm over the Pit of Chaos with the Weather Dominator weapon. A tornado traps Flint, Roadblock and Mutt into the pit, where Destro has planted strangling vines, which grow due to a rainstorm. Roadblock lets Flint and Mutt escape via a makeshift helicopter made from parts of a Skystriker, while he struggles against the vines. The vines die when the rain has stopped, allowing Roadblock to climb out of the pit. He later stows away in a trailer, where he meets and befriends truck company owner Honda Lou West. He and Honda Lou are smuggled into the Cobra Temple and captured alongside Duke and Snake Eyes. The four work together to escape the arena of sport, and successfully execute Roadblock's idea of stopping Destro's control of the Weather Dominator using the vines.

He also had a prominent role in the episode "Red Rocket's Glare", as did his uncle and aunt, Caleb and Sarah Bronson, who were part of the episode's plotline. In the episode, Roadblock and Recondo discover a series of new "Red Rocket" restaurants, and find Roadblock's aunt and uncle's diner replaced with one of them. The Joes later learn that the restaurants were opened by Cobra through Extensive Enterprises and are armed with missiles, which they then set out to disarm. As Roadblock climbs onto the last rocket, Tomax and Xamot try to stop him. The rocket launches, carrying Roadblock and the Crimson Twins, but Flint hits its nose cone with a missile from his Skystriker, saving Roadblock. Later, the Joes celebrate their victory at the Bronsons' diner, with Roadblock cooking with his uncle and aunt.

Roadblock is featured in two of the series' Public Service Announcements warning a couple of kids about the hazards of playing with/around fallen power lines and telling one kid to never give his address to a stranger.

==== G.I. Joe: The Movie ====
In G.I. Joe: The Movie, Roadblock has a prominent role. He leads a team of Joes in pursuit of the fleeing Cobra after their initial attack on G.I. Joe in an attempt to steal the Broadcast Energy Transmitter. Roadblock and the Joes follow Cobra into Cobra-La, where they are captured. During an escape attempt, the other Joes are re-captured, with only Roadblock managing to escape, but not before being temporarily blinded by Nemesis Enforcer. Aided by the slowly mutating Cobra Commander, Roadblock escapes Cobra-La and wanders through the snow with Cobra Commander before eventually being found by a G.I. Joe search party. With his vision restored, he is then able to lead the Joes back to Cobra-La's ice dome, where the final battle between Cobra-La and G.I. Joe takes place.

=== DiC ===
Roadblock appears in the DiC G.I. Joe cartoon, voiced by Blu Mankuma. He has a starring role in Episode 25, "The Eliminator".

=== G.I. Joe: Spy Troops ===
In G.I. Joe: Spy Troops, it is revealed that the G.I. Joe character Heavy Duty is a cousin of Roadblock and apparently shares the same passion for cooking, but not the talent of it.

=== G.I. Joe: Resolute ===
Roadblock appears in G.I. Joe: Resolute.

=== G.I. Joe: Renegades ===
In G.I. Joe: Renegades, Roadblock is reinterpreted as the chief mechanic and technical support person and one of the original six Renegade members. He is partnered with Tunnel Rat. In "Knockoffs," it is revealed he has a cousin named Hershel as they both share the same shoe size. Roadblock is re-interpreted with large sideburns and a high affinity for the team's van which he nicknames the "coyote" and continually shows his devotion to, as shown in the Renegades episode 15 "White Out" where he likens the truck to a well cultured and athletic woman and episode 16 "Shipwrecked" where he risks his life to save the van from sinking into the ocean. He is also shown to enjoy heavy metal music. Like his other versions, this Roadblock cooks, but does not speak in rhyme unlike the classic Roadblock. He has a cheerful and calm personality.

== Live action film ==
Roadblock
- G.I. Joe character
- First appearance: 2012
- Portrayed by: Dwayne Johnson

In-universe information
- Affiliation: G.I. Joe
- Specialty: Heavy Machine Gunner
- File name: Marvin F. Hinton
- Birth place: Biloxi, Mississippi
- Rank: E-9 (Sergeant Major), later O-3 (Captain)
- Primary MOS: Infantry Heavy Weapons
- Secondary MOS: Cook
- Series: G.I. Joe: Retaliation

Rapper-actor Common was originally asked to play the part of Roadblock in G.I. Joe: The Rise of Cobra, but was passed over, and Adewale Akinnuoye-Agbaje played the character Heavy Duty instead.

Dwayne Johnson portrays Roadblock in the sequel G.I. Joe: Retaliation. In the film, Roadblock is second-in-command to Duke, and is among the survivors of the military air-strike on G.I. Joe orchestrated by Zartan, who was at the time posing as the President of the United States. Leading Flint, Lady Jaye, Snake Eyes and Jinx, Roadblock successfully stops Cobra by defeating Firefly in combat and using his briefcase to stop the Cobra Zeus satellites. After that, he detonates Firefly's explosives with a device, killing Firefly in the explosion.

Johnson will be reprising his role in G.I. Joe: Ever Vigilant.

== Video games ==
Roadblock is one of the featured characters in the 1985 G.I. Joe: A Real American Hero computer game.

Roadblock is featured as a playable character in the 1992 game G.I. Joe: The Atlantis Factor. He is also featured as a playable character in the 1992 G.I. Joe arcade game.

== Novels ==
Roadblock is a supporting character in the Find Your Fate novel "Operation: Dragon Fire".

Roadblock is one of the main characters in the G.I. Joe Find Your Fate novel "Operation: Death Stone" (ISBN 0-345-32936-8). In this story, which the reader chooses the options, Roadblock is part of a team of Joes, including Gung-Ho and Snake Eyes, that is searching a remote Pacific jungle island for a strange meteor.

== Other media ==
- Roadblock appeared in the Robot Chicken episode "Day at the Circus", voiced by Seth Green. He is shown accompanying Flint and Gung-Ho on a mission. T-Pain voices Roadblock in the episode "The Ramblings of Maurice". Roadblock is honored for his 20 years of service with a chocolate statue.
- The webcomic Shortpacked! has Roadblock as a recurring character.
- In episode 15 titled "Inner Child" of the television series Fringe, Peter Bishop shows a mute child a Roadblock G.I. Joe figure and gives him a brief description of his bio.
- Roadblock's rhymes are briefly mentioned in the non-fiction paperback 'Saturday Morning Fever'.
- Kevin Michael Richardson reprised his role of Roadblock in the Family Guy episode "Amish Guy".
