= G.I. Joe: A Real American Hero 25th Anniversary =

Hasbro toy line

- Type: Action Figures
- Company: Hasbro
- Country: United States
- Availability: 2007–2009
- Official website

2007 marked the 25th anniversary of the G.I. Joe: A Real American Hero toyline. To commemorate the event, Hasbro released a G.I. Joe: A Real American Hero 25th Anniversary collection of newly sculpted 3¾" figures based on classic and new designs of many of the line's best known and most popular characters. The 25th Anniversary figures added a swivel chest feature to replace the traditional O-ring construction, and they added swivel wrists, ankles, and double-hinged knees in addition to the usual shoulder, elbow, and knee articulations.

Originally planned to consist of only two sets of five figures each (one G.I. Joe and one Cobra), the 25th Anniversary collection was well received by retailers and collectors, and was expanded by Hasbro into a full-fledged toyline that ran through 2009, when Hasbro moved to figures based on the movie G.I. Joe: The Rise of Cobra. The later releases in this line do not include the "25th Anniversary" branding, but in all other respects constitute a continuation of the 25th anniversary collection.

== Box sets ==
G.I. Joe Battle Pack #1 (2007)

- Duke
- Gung-Ho
- Roadblock
- Scarlett
- Snake Eyes (first version)

NOTE: Some Gung-Ho figures found with backwards arms; some Snake Eyes have "EXPLOSIVES" printed on bag

Cobra Battle Pack #1 (2007)

- Baroness
- Destro (first version)
- Cobra Commander (first version)
- Cobra Trooper (red logo)
- Storm Shadow (first version)

Cobra Legions 5-pack (2007)

- Cobra Commander (first version, black uniform)
- Cobra Trooper (red mask, with or without backpack hole)
- Cobra Air Trooper
- Cobra Vehicle Driver (STINGER driver)
- Storm Shadow (Valor vs Venom uniform)

Cobra Arctic Assault Squad pack (Internet Exclusive) (2008)

- Scrap-Iron
- Snow Serpent Officer
- Snow Serpent Trooper (Polar Combat Specialist)
- Snow Serpent Trooper (Heavy Weapons Specialist)
- Cobra Tele-Viper (Arctic Communications Specialist)
- Cobra Viper (Arctic Trooper)
- Cobra Viper (Heavy Weapons Trooper)

Cobra Night Watch 5-pack (Toys "R" Us exclusive) (2008)

- Cobra Officer (first version repaint, grey/black camo)
- Cobra Trooper x4 (first version repaint, blue/black camo)

Cobra Crimson Guard 5-pack (Toys "R" Us exclusive) (2008)

- Crimson Guard Leader (first version repaint, with silver facemask)
- Crimson Guard x4 (first version repaint, with silver facemask)

Cobra Desert Assault Squad pack (Internet Exclusive) (2008)

- Cobra Officer (first version repaint, tan uniform)
- Cobra Trooper (Explosives Specialist, tan uniform)
- Cobra Trooper (Flamethrower Specialist, tan uniform)
- Cobra Trooper (Hostile Environment Specialist, tan uniform)
- Crimson Guard x2 (first version repaint, tan uniform)
- Major Bludd

Firefly vs. G.I. Joe Troopers 5-pack (Toys R Us exclusive) (2008)

- Firefly (first version repaint)
- G.I. Joe Greenshirt x4

G.I. Joe Ninja Showdown 5-Pack (Toys "R" Us exclusive) (2008)

- Snake Eyes (first version repaint, with grey Timber)
- Red Ninja Leader (repaint)
- Red Ninja x3

G.I. Joe box set #2 (Jan 2009)

- Flint (first version, cartoon repaint with new arms)
- Hawk (cartoon repaint)
- Lady Jaye (cartoon repaint, new mold and DVD set head)
- Shipwreck (first version, cartoon repaint with new arms/head, new mold Polly with open wings)
- Snake Eyes (second version, black repaint of DVD set version, new mold Timber)

Cobra box set #2 (Jan 2009)

- Baroness (first version, cartoon repaint, new head/torso)
- Cobra Commander (hooded, cartoon repaint with cape/staff)
- Storm Shadow (first version, cartoon repaint, new arms)
- Cobra Viper (first version, cartoon repaint with new hands/chrome mask)
- Zartan (first version, cartoon repaint)

G.I. Joe Assault on Cobra Island box set (2009)

- Altitude (repaint of pieces from Ace, Airborne, Dusty, Red Star and Cobra Viper)
- Chuckles (repaint of pieces from Duke, Shipwreck and Spirit Iron-Knife)
- Hit & Run (repaint of pieces from Airborne, Hawk and Cobra Trooper)
- Outback (Night Force repaint of pieces from Flint, Snake Eyes and Cobra Trooper)
- Recondo (repaint of pieces from Duke and Dusty)
- Wet Suit (repaint of pieces from Snake Eyes and Torpedo)
- Zap (repaint of pieces from Clutch and Snake Eyes)

NOTE: All figures were created using pieces of multiple figures from 2007 and 2008.

Cobra Defense of Cobra Island box set (2009)

- Cobra Air-Viper
- Cobra Alley Viper (repaint of Snake Eyes, third version)
- Cobra B.A.T.
- Cobra Lamprey (repaint of pieces from Alpine and Snow Job)
- Cobra Night Creeper (repaint of pieces from Flint and Snake Eyes)
- Cobra Range-Viper (repaint of pieces from Beach Head, Snake Eyes and Cobra Trooper)
- Dr. Mindbender (repaint of pieces from Gung-Ho, Crimson Guard and Tomax & Xamot)

NOTE: The Cobra Air-Viper is the same as the Cobra C.L.A.W. Pilot that was released with the F.L.A.K. Cannon vs. Cobra C.L.A.W. Vehicle Set, but with a different flesh tone and a different shade of red on his uniform.

G.I. Joe: Resolute 5-pack (2009)

- Duke (Resolute)
- Cobra Commander (Resolute, black/red repaint)
- Cobra Officer (Resolute, red repaint)
- Cobra Trooper (Resolute, red repaint)
- Cobra B.A.T. (Resolute black/red)

== Single Carded Figures ==
=== 2007 ===
Wave 1 (Aug 2007)

- Cobra Commander (second version, Hooded with darker hood color) NOTE: Some figures had solid gold buckles on leg holster, others had gold buckle outline on leg holster.
- Cobra Officer (first version, with or without backpack hole)
- Flint (first version, with or without backpack hole)
- Snake Eyes (second version with grey Timber, with or without backpack hole) NOTE: Some figures came with a variant Black Timber.
- Storm Shadow (second version, G.I. Joe camo)

NOTE: Although Flint was a hard-to-find figure in this wave due to short supply, Snake Eyes with Black Timber was the chase figure. The Black Timber was not a mistake, and actually was distributed widely but limited. The Cobra Officer figure also has a paint variation, with either brown or black eyebrows.

Wave 2 (Oct 2007)

- Beach Head (first version, 'diaper' crotch piece, later with updated articulation)
- Buzzer (first version)
- Cobra Trooper (Silver Emblem, Black Mask, with or without backpack hole)
- Lady Jaye (first version)
- Serpentor (first version)

NOTE: Beach Head was later fixed in the crotch area, as some figures in the line were not able to sit properly. The Cobra Trooper also has a paint variation, with a solid black gun.

Wave 3 (Oct 2007)

- Firefly ('diaper' crotch piece, later with updated articulation)
- Red Ninja (first version)
- Sgt. Stalker (green camo, 'diaper' crotch piece, later with updated articulation)
- Sgt. Stalker (yellow camo, 'diaper' crotch piece)
- Sgt. Stalker (green camo, with backpack hole)
- Shipwreck (shark tattoo, anchor belt buckle)
- Shipwreck (anchor tattoo, anchor belt buckle)
- Shipwreck (anchor tattoo, blank belt buckle)
- Zartan ('color change' text printed on card)
- Zartan ('color change' text removed from card)
- Zartan ('color change' sticker on card)

NOTE: Sgt. Stalker was released in a yellow variant uniform. This was released as a mistake and not intended to be a variant figure. This is by far the rarest figure in the 25th anniversary line. Shipwreck was produced with a shark tattoo on his arm, but later in the production run, the shark was replaced with an anchor tattoo. Zartan was released with variations of packages with a sticker or no sticker. The one with no sticker either says "color changing face" but was printed on the card, or did not say anything. There were also variations of the head and neck, with a color changing face, a color changing face and neck, or a face and neck that don't change.

Wave 4 (Dec 2007)

- Cobra Air Trooper (from the Cobra Legions 5-pack)
- Cobra Commander (first version)
- Destro (first version)
- Duke (first version, with backpack instead of the binoculars)
- Gung-Ho (either no anchor on cap, or unpainted anchor molded on cap)
- Roadblock (first version)
- Scarlett (first version)
- Storm Shadow (first version)

NOTE: This whole wave consists of figures from the G.I. Joe and Cobra Battle Packs, which were first released as collector sets. These figures were packaged on single cards to fulfill fans and collectors needs. Some fans and collectors were disappointed, due to the missing Baroness.

=== 2008 ===
Wave 5 (Jan 2008)

- Sgt. Flash
- Snake Eyes (first version, 'diaper' crotch piece, later with updated articulation)
- Snow Job
- Crimson Guard
- Destro (second version, Iron Grenadiers uniform)

Wave 6 (Mar 2008)

- Lt. Torpedo
- Sgt. Rock N' Roll
- Cobra Commander (battle armor)

Wave 7 (May 2008)

- Duke (first version cartoon repaint, with jet pack and U.S. flag)
- Snake Eyes (third version, with butterfly knives)
- Spirit Iron-Knife (with Freedom)
- Wild Bill
- Cobra HISS Driver
- Cobra Viper

Wave 8 (Jun 2008)

- Flint (first version Tiger Force repaint)
- Roadblock (second version)
- Snake Eyes (first version Arctic Trooper repaint)
- Baroness (blue cartoon repaint)
- Cobra Commander (first version cartoon repaint, with MASS Device radioactive crystals element)
- Cobra Officer (Python Patrol uniform)
- Major Bludd

Wave 9 (Jul 2008)

- Barbecue
- Hawk (second version)
- Sgt. Bazooka
- Cobra B.A.T.
- Cobra Snow Serpent
- Storm Shadow (Ninja Ku Leader)

Wave 10 (Oct 2008)

- Duke (first version Tiger Force repaint)
- Mutt & Junkyard
- Cobra Bazooka Trooper
- Cobra Para Viper
- Croc Master
- Wraith (standard version)
- Wraith (translucent blue version)

Wave 11 (Nov 2008)

- Flint (in Cobra disguise)
- Scarlett (blue and silver uniform)
- Sgt. Airborne
- Specialist Trakker (M.A.S.K.)
- Cobra EEL
- Zartan (with mini Swamp Skier)

Wave 12 (Dec 2008)

- Tripwire (with M.A.S.S. Device desert element)
- Cobra Diver (with M.A.S.S. Device heavy water element)
- Cobra Ninja Viper (Storm Shadow repaint)
- Cobra Trooper (red logo and mask)
- Crimson Guard (Python Patrol uniform)
- Ripper (Dreadnok)

=== 2009 ===
Wave 13 (2009)

- Blowtorch
- Duke (G.I. Joe: Resolute uniform)
- Cobra Commander (from the G.I. Joe: Resolute 5-pack)
- Cobra Trooper (from the G.I. Joe: Resolute 5-pack, blue repaint)
- Firefly (blue repaint)
- Torch (Dreadnok)

Hall Of Heroes (Internet Exclusive) (Spring 2009)

- Snake Eyes (second version with Timber, numbered 1 of 10)
- Firefly (numbered 2 of 10)
- Cobra B.A.T. (numbered 3 of 10)
- Storm Shadow (first version, numbered 4 of 10)
- Beach Head (numbered 5 of 10)
- Cobra Viper (numbered 6 of 10)
- Crimson Guard (numbered 7 of 10)
- Flint (numbered 8 of 10)
- Zartan (numbered 9 of 10)
- Snake Eyes (first version, numbered 10 of 10)

== Comic 2-packs ==
=== Wave 1 (2008) ===
G.I. Joe comic #1: "Operation: Lady Doomsday" (reprint of G.I. Joe #1)

- Hawk (first version, 'diaper' crotch piece, black web gear)
- Scarlett (first version repaint)

G.I. Joe comic #21: "Silent Interlude" (reprint of G.I. Joe #21)

- Snake Eyes (first version repaint, 'diaper' crotch piece)
- Storm Shadow (first version repaint, 'diaper' crotch piece)

G.I. Joe comic #24: "The Commander Escapes" (reprint of G.I. Joe #24)

- Duke (first version repaint)
- Cobra Commander (first version repaint)

=== Wave 2 (2008) ===
G.I. Joe comic #14: "Destro Attacks" (reprint of G.I. Joe #14)

- Breaker
- Destro (first version repaint with vac-metal head)

G.I. Joe comic #30: "Darkness" (reprint of G.I. Joe #30)

- Ripper
- Torch

G.I. Joe comic #1: "Operation: Lady Doomsday" (re-release)

- Hawk (first version, updated articulation)
- Scarlett (first version repaint)

G.I. Joe comic #21: "Silent Interlude" (re-release)

- Snake Eyes (first version repaint, updated articulation)
- Storm Shadow (first version repaint, updated articulation)

=== Wave 3 (Apr/May 2008) ===
G.I. Joe comic #115: "Counting Coup" (reprint of G.I. Joe #115)

- Captain Ace
- Wild Weasel

G.I. Joe comic #21B: "Silence Between Borders" (new story by Larry Hama)

- Snake Eyes (battle damage)
- Storm Shadow (cloak/compound bow)

G.I. Joe comic #32 1/2: "One Day in Springfield" (new story by Larry Hama)

- Crimson Guard (Fred, with removable helmet)
- Cobra Officer (Scar-Face)

G.I. Joe comic #36 1/2: "Bad Day at the Circus" (new story by Larry Hama)

- Tomax and Xamot

=== Wave 4 (May/Jun 2008) ===
G.I. Joe comic #4: "Backstabbed" (new story by Larry Hama)

- Firefly (darker repaint with vest)
- Storm Shadow (Devil's Due uniform)

G.I. Joe comic #5: "Security Shield" (new story by Larry Hama)

- Copperhead
- Shipwreck (white/black repaint with life vest)

G.I. Joe comic #6: "Oblivion Express" (new story by Larry Hama)

- Duke (greenshirt first version repaint)
- Red Star

=== Wave 5 (Aug 2008) ===
G.I. Joe comic #7: "Move and Countermove" (new story by Larry Hama)

- Destro (released with both gold helmet and black helmet variants)
- Iron Grenadier

G.I. Joe comic #8: "Showdown at the Top of the World" (new story by Larry Hama)

- Lt. Falcon
- Nemesis Immortal (Nemesis Enforcer)

G.I. Joe comic #9: "Explosive Thoughts" (new story by Larry Hama)

- Cobra Commander (with cape)
- Tripwire

=== Wave 6 (Nov 2008) ===
G.I. Joe comic #10: "The Tiger and the Teapot" (new story by Larry Hama)

- Snake Eyes (ninja apprentice)
- Hard Master

G.I. Joe comic #11: "The Dark Beneath the Silence" (new story by Larry Hama)

- Beach Head (first version, '86 figure update, removable cowl)
- Dataframe (Mainframe)

G.I. Joe comic #12: "Showdown Under the Sun" (new story by Larry Hama)

- Scrap-Iron
- Wild Bill (cartoon repaint)

=== Wave 7 (Dec 2008) ===
G.I. Joe comic #25: "Zartan!" (reprint of G.I. Joe #25)

- Deep Six (first version, repaint)
- Rock N' Roll (first version, repaint, updated "fixed" arms)

G.I. Joe comic #64: "Maneuvering for Position" (reprint of G.I. Joe #64)

- Gung-Ho (first version repaint)
- Cobra Commander (battle armor with Fred VII head)

G.I. Joe comic #86: "Not Fade Away" (reprint of G.I. Joe #86)

- Iron Grenadier (first version)
- Cobra Viper (first version)

=== Wave 8 (Jan 2009) ===
G.I. Joe Resolute Comic #1: "Sicilian Defense" (new story by Larry Hama)

- Destro (Pilot)
- Shockblast (Shockwave)

G.I. Joe Resolute Comic #2: "22 Minutes" (new story by Larry Hama)

- Storm Shadow (training)
- Tunnel Rat

== Team 3-packs (2008) ==
=== Wave 1 ===
G.I. Joe Senior Ranking Officers 3-pack (Toys "R" Us exclusive) (set 1 of 3)

- Duke (first version, repaint from wave 7)
- General Hawk (green field uniform)
- Grunt (first version)

Crimson Guard Command 3-pack (Toys "R" Us exclusive) (set 2 of 3)

- Cobra Commander (hooded, red repaint)
- Crimson Guard Officer (CG repaint)
- Crimson Guard Trooper

Cobra Infantry Command 3-pack (Toys "R" Us exclusive) (set 3 of 3)

- Cobra Commander (first version, cartoon colors)
- Cobra Officer (cartoon colors)
- Cobra Trooper (cartoon colors)

=== Wave 2 (Sep 2008) ===
Senior Ranking Officers Air Command (Toys "R" Us exclusive) (set 1 of 3)

- Ace (first version, repaint)
- Skyduster (remake of Starduster)
- Wild Bill (first version, repaint)

Senior Ranking Officers Naval Command (Toys "R" Us exclusive) (set 2 of 3)

- Cutter
- Deep Six (Ace body repaint)
- Lt. Torpedo (yellow)

Senior Ranking Officers Iron Grenadiers (Toys "R" Us exclusive) (set 3 of 3)

- Destro
- Iron Grenadier Officer (packaging got mixed up, black/purple/gold)
- Iron Grenadier Trooper (regular black/red/gold trooper)

== Figure exclusives ==
- Pimp Daddy Destro (SDCC 2007 exclusive, with both silver and gold head versions)
- Cobra Commander with podium (SDCC 2008 exclusive, with both black suit and blue suit versions)
- Doc (2008, exclusive mail-away) (Number 1 or number 2 on silver revolver)

== DVD Battle Packs ==
"The Mass Device" DVD Battle Pack (July 2008) (set 1 of 5)

- Baroness (cartoon Scarlett mold in red, new head/legs, with scuba gear)
- Cobra Trooper (first version cartoon repaint)
- Snake Eyes (first version cartoon repaint, with translucent red parts and grey Timber)
- Stalker (first version repaint, with jet pack)
- MASS Device accessory

"Weather Dominator" DVD Battle Pack (July 2008) (set 2 of 5)

- Destro (first version cartoon repaint)
- Lady Jaye (first version cartoon repaint, with new head)
- Roadblock (first version cartoon repaint)
- Weather Dominator accessory
- MASS Device accessory

"Arise, Serpentor, Arise" DVD Battle Pack (Fall 2008) (set 3 of 5)

- B.A.T. (cartoon repaint)
- Serpentor (classic cartoon repaint)
- Dusty
- Montezuma's Skeleton
- MASS Device accessory

"Pyramid of Darkness" DVD Battle Pack (Fall 2008) (set 4 of 5)

- Cobra Commander (hooded, cartoon repaint)
- Major Bludd (silver cartoon repaint)
- Quick Kick
- Snake Eyes (second version cartoon repaint)
- MASS Device accessory

"Best of 80s Episodes" DVD Battle Pack (Fall 2008) (set 5 of 5)

- Alpine
- Duke (first version, with jetpack and yelling head)
- Cobra Commander (chrome facemask, with bomb)
- Cobra Trooper (paratrooper)
- Cobra C.L.A.W. Glider vehicle
- MASS Device accessory

"Greatest Battles" DVD Battle Pack (Spring 2009)

- Cobra Commander (Valor vs Venom style)
- Duke (Valor vs Venom style)
- Snake Eyes (Valor vs Venom style)
- Storm Shadow (Valor vs Venom style)

== Vehicles ==
Target Exclusive vehicles (April 2008)

- A.W.E. Striker, with Crankcase
- Cobra H.I.S.S. tank (first version, blue repaint), with Cobra Driver (repaint)
- Night Specter (S.H.A.R.C. repaint), with Grand Slam

Vehicles Wave 1 (July 2008)

- Cobra H.I.S.S. tank (first version, black repaint), with H.I.S.S. Commander (Rip It)
- V.A.M.P., with Double Clutch
- Vehicle Set: Armadillo, with Steeler vs. Serpentor's Air Chariot, with Serpentor
- Vehicle Set: R.A.M., with Cpl. Breaker vs. Cobra Flight Pod (Trubble Bubble), with Tele-Viper

Target Exclusive vehicles Wave 2 (Sept 2008)

- Conquest X-30, with Lt. Slip Stream
- Cobra Rattler, with Wild Weasel

Vehicles Wave 2 (Oct 2008)

- Cobra Firebat, with A.V.A.C
- Sharc Tooth (S.H.A.R.C.), with Deep Six

Vehicles Wave 3 (Nov 2008)

- A.W.E. Striker (desert repaint), with Leatherneck (Mission Brazil uniform)
- Cobra F.A.N.G., with Cobra Pilot
- Cobra C.L.A.W., with Cobra Viper (first version, repaint)

Ultimate Battle Pack (Target Exclusive) (Nov 2008)

- M.O.B.A.T., with Steeler (repaint)
- Cobra Flight Pod (blue), with Cobra Commander (repaint)
- Crimson H.I.S.S., with Cobra H.I.S.S. Driver (repaint)
- Cobra Vehicle Gunner (repaint of Cobra Trooper)
- Destro (Iron Grenadier repaint)
- Short-Fuze
- Stalker (repaint)

Vehicles Wave 4 (2009)

- Ghost H.A.W.K. (Skyhawk V.T.O.L.), with Lift Ticket
- Sting Raider (Water Moccasin), with Copperhead (Python Patrol uniform)

Internet Exclusive vehicles (2009)

- Arctic H.I.S.S. (first version, white repaint), with Arctic H.I.S.S. Driver
- Cobra Stinger, with Cobra Stinger Driver
- Vehicle Set: F.L.A.K. Cannon, with Outback vs. Cobra C.L.A.W. (red repaint), with Air Viper Commando

Target Exclusive vehicles (Spring 2009)

- Python Patrol Conquest X-30, with Python Patrol Viper
- Tiger Rat, with Wild Bill (first version, Tiger Force repaint)
