= Cover Girl (G.I. Joe) =

G.I. Joe character

- G.I. Joe character
- First appearance: G.I. Joe: A Real American Hero issue #16 (October 1983)
- Voiced by: Libby Aubrey (Sunbow); Grey DeLisle (Resolute)

In-universe information
- Affiliation: G.I. Joe
- Specialty: Wolverine Driver
- File name: Krieger, Courtney A.
- Birth place: Peoria, Illinois
- SN: RA 973244860
- Rank: E-4 (Specialist); E-5 (Sergeant) (Devil's Due comics)
- Primary MOS: Armor
- Secondary MOS: Armored Fighting Vehicle (AFV) Mechanics, Counterintelligence

Cover Girl is a fictional character from the G.I. Joe: A Real American Hero toyline, comic books and animated series. She is a tank jockey for the G.I. Joe Team, specializing in the Wolverine missile tank, and debuted in 1983 on the same team. She is portrayed by Karolína Kurková in the 2009 live-action film G.I. Joe: The Rise of Cobra.

== Profile ==
Her real name is Courtney A. Krieger, and she was born in Peoria, Illinois. Her primary military specialty is armor and her secondary military specialty is AFV (Armored Fighting Vehicle) mechanic.

Prior to joining G.I. Joe, Cover Girl was a successful fashion model in Chicago and New York and graced the covers of countless magazines. She eventually found the world of modeling unfulfilling and joined the army to seek out new challenges in life. In order to prove that she was not just a pretty face, she attended Armor School at Fort Knox as well as related tech schools. Cover Girl is proficient in diesel mechanics & gas turbine technology. She is also a qualified expert with the LAW (Light Anti-Armor Weapon) rocket, Dragon AT (Anti-Tank) missile, M-16 and the M1911A1 Auto Pistol.

Though her specialty was primarily armor based, Cover Girl was eventually called upon to use her expertise in makeup and stagecraft for undercover and intelligence-gathering operations. She resented assignments that took advantage of her natural beauty, but eventually expanded her knowledge of undercover work at Fort Huachuca Military Intelligence School. This increased the scope of her skill set as a capable field agent for the G.I. Joe Team.

== Toys ==
Cover Girl was first released as an action figure in 1983, packaged with the "Wolverine" tank. She was not updated until 2005, when she was released in the Devil's Due Fans' Choice three-pack of figures (along with Spirit Iron-Knife and Hannibal: Reborn), but her codename was dropped, with the packaging referring to her as "Agent Courtney Kreiger".

=== International variants ===
The 1983 figure has been released in Brazil as "Agente Secreta: Sparta". In Argentina, Cover Girl was repainted with blue highlights, and released an Argentinian version of "Sparta".

== Comics ==
=== Marvel Comics ===
Cover Girl first appears in the Marvel Comics series G.I. Joe: A Real American Hero #16 (October 1983). She works with other Joes to protect the U.S. Treasury building from Cobra agents. Later, she works with Clutch to chase Cobra operatives in Europe.

Cover Girl joins a Joe raid of the fictional country of Frusenland in an attempt to stop Cobra from brainwashing the citizens into violence. She works with tank driver Back-Stop to destroy many Cobra vehicles. She and the other Joes are affected by Cobra's brainwashing weapons and then saved from certain death by Battleforce 2000, the very men they had entered the country to protect.

She is one of the many Joes on the run from the law due to the Jugglers' wishing to blame the team for a badly-executed raid on Cobra Island. In the ensuing rescue of General Hawk and General Hollingsworth from their clinic/prison, Cover Girl is shot in the shoulder. In Special Missions #24, Cover Girl, Lady Jaye, Scarlett and Jinx work to protect the President during an exhibition baseball game by grudgingly going undercover as cheerleaders, but he is nonetheless captured by a Cobra blimp. Working with Hardball, she assists with the rescue by batting a gas canister into the blimp. In the same issue it was revealed that she was able to bring people out of hypnosis, undoing the effects caused by the Cobra hypnotist Crystal Ball.

Cover Girl's final Marvel series appearance was a cameo in #149, monitoring Destro's castle.

=== IDW Publishing ===
==== G.I. Joe ====
In IDW's original series, Cover Girl primarily works on a team consisting of Duke, Roadblock, Shipwreck, Tunnel Rat, Quick Kick, and Doc. A later origin issue reveals that she was recruited after showing an aptitude for cold-blooded killing when she slaughters a group of pirates single-handed, later admitting that she finally found something she was good at—killing people.

==== G.I. Joe: A Real American Hero ====
Cover-Girl is part of a G.I. Joe tank crew that works with the remnants of the Oktober Guard to protect civilians from Cobra factional fighting. She is assisted by Cross-Country, Steeler and Wildcard.

During a shootout with a Crimson Guardsman later in the series, Cover Girl awakens from a coma. She then learns her throat has been severely injured, causing a deep voice.

== Other versions ==
=== Devil's Due Publishing ===
Starting from 'Devil's Due' G.I. Joe: A Real American Hero (vol. 2) #16 she teams with Joe members Spirit and Snake Eyes to figure out why identical looking children are being kidnapped. This soon blends in to an incident where she and Spirit are one of many Joes held prisoner on the newly revamped Cobra Island. The group escapes with the intervention of Cobra Commander, who is also a prisoner.

It was revealed in Issue #20 of G.I. Joe: America's Elite that she was dating Shipwreck, much to the jealousy of Clutch. Cover Girl has appeared with Shipwreck in G.I. Joe Special Missions: Brazil. Her relationship with Shipwreck is revealed in depth via flashbacks while in the present the two work together to rescue a kidnapped Senator in Rio de Janeiro. Their relationship again comes into focus when the two confront a retired Cobra agent named Skullbuster. The two Joes eventually subdue and capture their adversary.

In the alternate reality of the G.I. Joe vs. Transformers continuity, Cover Girl assists Snake Eyes who had been wounded in his face by an explosion. This was caused by attacking alien robots.

== Animated series ==
=== Sunbow ===
In Sunbow's G.I. Joe animated series, Cover Girl was voiced by Liz Aubrey. She first appears in the "Real American Hero" mini-series, in which she wears a green jacket and has long blonde hair. She was redesigned to better resemble her action figure (with a brown jacket and short auburn hair) from her next appearance in "The Revenge of Cobra" mini-series onwards. On missions, Cover Girl was often paired with Shipwreck.

Cover Girl had a supporting role in the first-season episode "Twenty Questions", in which she heads a Joe search party to find Shipwreck in the Rocky Mountains area.

Her first major role was in "Lights! Camera! Cobra!", as one of several Joes hired as technical advisors on a movie about G.I. Joe. Through much of the episode, Cover Girl tries to make sure Shipwreck stays out of trouble. She follows him into Hollywood, where she becomes embroiled in his fight in a pool hall which they are then arrested for. After their release, they rescue the missing Joes, Dusty and Recondo, who are injured. While Cover Girl takes them to the hospital, Shipwreck is captured by Cobra. However, Cover Girl devises a ruse that convinces Cobra Commander to return him.

Cover Girl had another significant role in "Cobra Claws Are Coming to Town". She takes command of the Joes when Cobra takes Duke captive, and leads them in stopping Cobra from attacking a city in G.I. Joe vehicles. Flying a Cobra Rattler, Cover Girl fires a missile at a Joe Skystriker piloted by Cobra Commander and where Duke is being held, and demands him to land. Cobra Commander ignores her warning and shoots the Rattler, but Cover Girl is saved by a giant Polly. She gives Duke a key to his handcuffs and kisses him while wishing him a merry Christmas.

Cover Girl's background as a model is hinted at in the second-season episode, "Glamor Girls". She and Lady Jaye infiltrate a modeling shoot arranged by a disguised Zartan and Baroness. Cover Girl tricks the two Cobra agents into showing they are fakes by telling them she and Lady Jaye came from an agency that has been out of business for years. Cover Girl and Lady Jaye later rescue several models and actresses that had been captured by Cobra because of the scheme.

==== G.I. Joe: The Movie ====
Cover Girl appears as a background character in several scenes of the 1987 animated G.I. Joe: The Movie. In the movie, her hair is once again long, though its color remains auburn.

=== Resolute ===
Cover Girl also appears in the animated series, G.I. Joe: Resolute as an auburn brunette. She is seen assisting in the evacuation of the U.S.S. Flagg.

=== Renegades ===
In the G.I. Joe: Renegades episode "Shipwrecked", Cover Girl (Courtney Kreiger) was first mentioned by Shipwreck when he showed Courtney's model poster to the Joes after Duke asked Shipwreck why he called his ship Courtney. Her picture is shown on a wall in which she is shown with blonde hair.

== Live action film ==
Cover Girl
- G.I. Joe character
- First appearance: 2009
- Portrayed by: Karolína Kurková

In-universe information
- Affiliation: G.I. Joe
- Specialty: Special Weapons Expert
- File name: Kreiger, Courtney
- SN: 973-24-CK44
- Rank: Corporal (E-4)
- Series: G.I. Joe: The Rise of Cobra

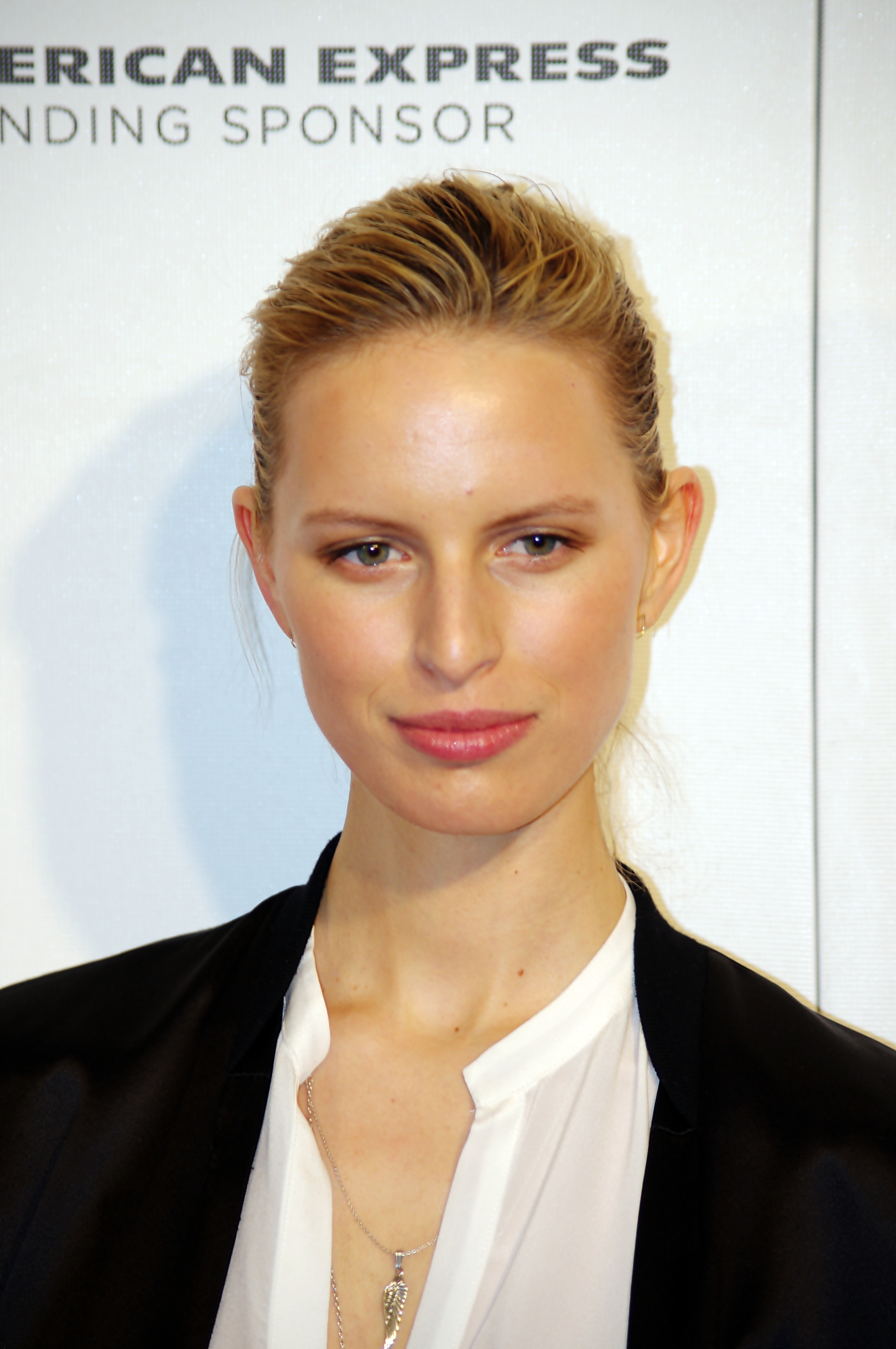
Karolína Kurková portrayed Cover Girl in G.I. Joe: The Rise of Cobra

In the film of G.I. Joe: The Rise of Cobra, she has a brief role played by Czech supermodel and real life cover girl Karolína Kurková. She serves as aide-de-camp to General Hawk. When Cobra infiltrates the Pit, Cover Girl is wary of an MP wandering the halls. While reporting to Hawk, she is stabbed from the back by the MP, who is Zartan in disguise.

To coincide with the launch of the new movie, Hasbro released one Cover Girl figure. She is listed as Courtney "Cover Girl" Kreiger with the specialty of Special Weapons Officer.

== Other works ==
- The character of Cover Girl is discussed at length in the non-fiction novel The Paradise of Bombs.
- She is mentioned as a strong female character in the non-fiction novel Action Chicks: New Images of Tough Women in Popular Culture.
- Dorian Brown played an FBI agent named Courtney Krieger in the NCIS episode "Identity Crisis".
