= G.I. Joe: A Real American Hero (1983 TV series) =

1983-1986 American animated TV series

- Also known as: Action Force (UK version)
- Genre: Action-adventure; Military science fiction
- Created by: Hasbro
- Based on: G.I. Joe: A Real American Hero by Hasbro
- Developed by: Ron Friedman (miniseries 1–2); Steve Gerber (season 1); Buzz Dixon (season 2)
- Directed by: Dan Thompson (miniseries 1–2); John Gibbs (season 1); Terry Lennon (season 1); Ray Lee (season 2)
- Voices of: Michael Bell; Arthur Burghardt; Corey Burton; William Callaway; Brian Cummings; Dick Gautier; Ed Gilbert; Chris Latta; Morgan Lofting; Kene Holliday; Mary McDonald-Lewis; Bill Ratner; Bob Remus; B.J. Ward
- Narrated by: Jackson Beck
- Composers: Johnny Douglas; Robert J. Walsh
- Country of origin: United States
- Original language: English
- No. of seasons: 2
- No. of episodes: 95 (list of episodes)

Production
- Executive producers: Joe Bacal; David H. DePatie (The M.A.S.S. Device mini-series); Margaret Loesch (The Revenge of Cobra mini-series, seasons 1–2); Tom Griffin
- Producers: Don Jurwich; Jim Duffy
- Animator: Toei Animation
- Running time: 30 minutes
- Production companies: Sunbow Productions; Marvel Productions

Original release
- Network: First-run syndication
- Release: September 12, 1983 – November 20, 1986

Related
- G.I. Joe: A Real American Hero (1989 TV series); G.I. Joe Extreme; G.I. Joe: Sigma 6; G.I. Joe: Renegades

G.I. Joe: A Real American Hero (retitled Action Force in the United Kingdom, also known as G.I. Joe: International Heroes in some international English-speaking regions) is a half-hour American military science fiction animated television series created by Ron Friedman. Based on the toyline from Hasbro, the cartoon ran in syndication from 1983 to 1986. 95 episodes were produced.

== History ==
"G.I. Joe is the code name for America's daring, highly-trained special mission force. Its purpose: to defend human freedom against Cobra, a ruthless terrorist organization determined to rule the world!"

— opening narration from the Sunbow seasons also said in the animated film.

When Hasbro launched the G.I. Joe: A Real American Hero toyline in 1982 alongside the Marvel Comics series, it commissioned Marvel Productions to produce a series of fully animated 30-second television commercials which were broadcast in order to promote the comic book publication, since advertising regulations for a literary work were more lax than for a direct toy commercial. The commercial for the first issue began airing throughout the Spring of 1982. The popularity of these commercials led to the production of a five-part G.I. Joe mini-series which aired in 1983 (later titled "The M.A.S.S. Device" when it re-aired as part of the ongoing series). The plot centers on the titular M.A.S.S. Device, a powerful matter-transporter, and G.I. Joe and Cobra's race around the world to acquire the three catalytic elements which power the machine. A second five-part mini-series followed in 1984, G.I. Joe: The Revenge of Cobra (titled "The Weather Dominator" in later airings), with a similar plot that involved the Joes and Cobras traveling around the world to recover the scattered fragments of Cobra's new weather-controlling weapon, the Weather Dominator. Both mini-series were written by Ron Friedman.

G.I. Joe was promoted to a full series in 1985, with an initial order for a first season of 55 more episodes (in order to make up the required 65 episodes for syndication). This season began with a third Friedman-penned five-part adventure, "The Pyramid of Darkness"; the story sees most of the existing cast from the two previous mini-series held captive by Cobra, while a new assortment of characters (that is, the new 1985 range of toys) thwart Cobra's attempts to surround the Earth with the electricity-negating Pyramid of Darkness. Both the new and old characters then shared the spotlight throughout the course of the remaining fifty episodes of the series, which were primarily stand-alone single-episode adventures, with the occasional two-part story. The season was story edited by Steve Gerber. A second season of 30 episodes followed in 1986, beginning with a fourth five-part story, "Arise, Serpentor, Arise!" in which Cobra scientist Doctor Mindbender, inspired by a recurring dream, uses the DNA of history's most ruthless conquerors and rulers to genetically engineer Serpentor, who usurps Cobra Commander's leadership of Cobra.

This mini-series introduced the new 1986 range of toys into the story, which were at the center of most stories across the rest of the season; in particular, the mini-series debuted former WWF and then-current AWA professional wrestler Sgt. Slaughter as a member of G.I. Joe, played by himself. For this season, Buzz Dixon replaced Steve Gerber as story editor.

=== Film ===
G.I. Joe: The Movie, a feature-length film version of the series, was intended to be released theatrically, followed by the release of The Transformers: The Movie. However, the movie encountered unexpected production delays which allowed the Transformers feature to be released first. Due to the poor box office performances of the Transformers and My Little Pony films, G.I. Joe was relegated to direct-to-video status. It was released on VHS on April 20, 1987, and was later split into a five-part mini-series for television syndication. The movie follows up on the events of Season 2, revealing that Cobra Commander is actually an agent of a secret civilization known as Cobra-La led by a half-serpent being named Golobulus. The same organization is also revealed to have had a hand in the creation of Serpentor, as the dream that inspired Doctor Mindbender to create him is revealed to be a subconscious suggestion that was implanted into his mind by one of Golobulus's bugs called the Psychic Motivator. In addition to Cobra-La, two new sub-teams were introduced within the Joe Team, the Rawhides and the Renegades, both of which were composed of characters which were introduced into the toyline during its 1987 lineup.

=== Cancellation ===
Marvel Productions continued to produce animated commercials for the toyline and comic books (which featured a new theme song with the lyrics "Nobody Beats G.I. Joe") after the broadcast of G.I. Joe: The Movie, which was intended to set up Season 3. However, the company never produced a third full season, ending up losing its license to the competing animation company DiC during pre-production. Michael Charles Hill, who wrote several episodes of the show, had already proposed an outline for Season 3 that would have followed the events of The Movie. In this unmade third season, a criminal organization named "The Coil", composed of surviving members of Cobra Command led by Tomax and Xamot, would have served as the new enemy faction, while a mutated Cobra Commander would have tried to secretly rebuild his organization after the destruction of Cobra-La, shifting allegiance between the Coil and the Joes in order to further his own ambitions.

=== Subsequent series ===
A second G.I. Joe: A Real American Hero series was produced by DIC Entertainment that ran from 1989 to 1991. It premiered with a five-part mini-series which was titled "Operation: Dragonfire," lasted two seasons, and consisted of a total of 44 episodes. The DiC series served as a continuation of the Sunbow series, but it did not use the aforementioned season 3 pitch. Sunbow would later return to the G.I. Joe franchise, co-producing the 1994 straight-to-video animated pilot Sgt. Savage and his Screaming Eagles and the G.I. Joe Extreme TV series, which aired from 1995 to 1996. The Screaming Eagles pilot featured appearances by characters from the A Real American Hero series (namely Hawk, Doc, Lady Jaye, and Cobra Commander) in supporting roles, but its primary focus was on new heroes and villains.

== Summary ==
G.I. Joe fights off the plans of terrorist organization Cobra to undermine the world governments and take over. Following the failure of Cobra's more elaborate plans, the organization starts coming up with ridiculous and outlandish ways to takeover. By the second season, Dr. Mindbender, along with Destro, Tomax and Xamot, have tired of the constant failures Cobra Commander has brought them. This leads to them creating a new leader from the combined DNA of past ruthless dictators: Serpentor. However, Cobra Commander persists as the field commander, and slowly builds his own faction to depose their usurper.

== Production ==
G.I. Joe was a co-production between Marvel Productions and Sunbow Productions. Sunbow's staff would write the scripts based on the character and vehicle designs provided by Hasbro, while the artists at Marvel Productions would draw storyboards based on the scripts and record voiceovers. The animation was outsourced to Toei in Japan, who worked on all 95 episodes, as well as the movie. The G.I. Joe comics and animated series share a few common plot elements that were not products of the toyline at the time such as the town of Springfield, the Oktober Guard and the character of The Baroness (who was only introduced into the toyline in 1984). However, they did not share the same continuity and as a result, they differed significantly in terms of how the characters were written and the direction the stories took (particularly regarding the nature of Cobra Commander's true identity). In contrast to the comics (in which non-toyline characters such as G.I. Joe commanding officer General Flagg and Cobra scientist Dr. Venom, were killed off early during its run), the TV series had to adhere to children's programming regulations and as a result none of the characters were allowed to use actual firearms and nobody was ever killed on-screen. Instead, characters used laser guns to fight their battles (which were color-coded for each side, red for the Joes and blue for Cobra) and whenever a vehicle was destroyed on-screen, the pilot or driver would often be shown exiting from it or parachuting before the destruction. However, the show was still allowed to make references to off-screen casualties, as the term could be used interchangeably for injuries and deaths. One particular episode in Season 1, a two-parter titled "Worlds Without End" in which the Joes are transported to an alternate universe where the Joes have been defeated by Cobra, features a scene in which three members of the Joe Team (Steeler, Grunt and Clutch) find the skeletal remains of their counterparts from that world (the second part of the episode ends with the aforementioned characters deciding to remain in the alternate universe and replace their deceased counterparts). A public safety lesson was usually featured at the end of each episode, using G.I. Joe characters in brief scenarios to impart safety tips to children. These lessons gave birth to the catchphrase, "Now we know!", and the response, "And knowing is half the battle". In each episode's opening title sequence voice actor Jackson Beck states that, "G.I. Joe is the code name for America's daring, highly-trained, Special Mission force. Its purpose: To defend human freedom against Cobra, a ruthless terrorist organization determined to rule the world". Because the series was produced as a vehicle to sell the toys, most of the episodes would focus on the newest characters being sold in stores at the time, while older characters would fall by the wayside as they were being phased out from the toyline. Most notably Hawk, who was part of the 1982 launch lineup and the original G.I. Joe leader in the Marvel comics, was absent during the entirety of Season 1 in favor of having Duke (a character introduced in 1983, the year when the first miniseries aired) serve as the leader instead. When Hawk was reintroduced to the toyline with a new action figure in 1986, the character was suddenly part of the team in Season 2 as Duke's superior and the head of G.I. Joe's chain of command with no explanation for his absence in the prior season. (Note: Buzz Dixon would later explain that an episode was planned to introduce Hawk's character for the Season 2 premiere, but was abandoned in favor of the "Arise, Serpentor Arise" five-parter instead.)

== Cast ==
- Charlie Adler – Low-Light
- Jack Angel – Wet Suit, Viper, Thunder (in "The Most Dangerous Thing in the World")
- Libby Aubrey – Cover Girl
- Jackson Beck – Narrator
- Michael Bell – Blowtorch, Clutch, Duke, Lift-Ticket, Major Bludd, Scrap-Iron, Tollbooth, Xamot, Cobra Trooper, Viper, Tele-Viper
- Gregg Berger – Colonel Brekhov, Cutter, Firefly, Rip Cord, Sparks, Spirit
- Arthur Burghardt – Destro, Iceberg, Stalker, Cobra Trooper
- Corey Burton – Tomax, Lt. Clay Moore (in "The Traitor" Pt. 2)
- William Callaway – Beach Head
- François Chau – Quick Kick
- Peter Cullen – Airborne, Zandar, Cobra Trooper
- Brian Cummings – Doctor Mindbender
- Pat Fraley – Ace, Airtight, Wild Weasel, Cobra Trooper
- Hank Garrett – Dial Tone
- Dick Gautier – Serpentor
- Ed Gilbert – General Hawk
- Dan Gilvezan – Slip Stream, Beach Head (in "Let's Play Soldier")
- Dave Hall - Colonel Sharp
- Zack Hoffman – Zartan
- Kene Holliday – Roadblock
- John Hostetter – Bazooka
- Jerry Houser – Sci-Fi
- Buster Jones – Doc, Zap, Cobra Trooper
- Chris Latta – Breaker, Cobra Commander, Frostbite, Gung-Ho, Ripper, Steeler, Tele-Viper
- Loren Lester – Barbecue
- Morgan Lofting – Baroness
- Chuck McCann – Leatherneck
- Michael McConnohie – Cross-Country
- Mary McDonald-Lewis – Lady Jaye
- Bill Morey – Recondo
- Rob Paulsen – Snow Job, Tripwire, Flash
- Patrick Pinney – Mainframe
- Lisa Raggio – Zarana
- Bill Ratner – Flint, Cobra Trooper, Strato-Viper
- Hal Rayle – Deep Six
- Bob Remus – Sgt. Slaughter
- Neil Ross – Buzzer, Dusty, Heavy Metal, Monkeywrench, Shipwreck, Thunder
- Dan Roth – Grunt
- Will Ryan – Footloose, Rock 'n Roll, Mutt
- Ted Schwartz – Thrasher
- John Stephenson – General Flagg, General Hawk (in "The Spy Who Rooked Me" and a single spoken line in "My Favorite Things")
- B.J. Ward – Scarlett
- Lee Weaver – Alpine
- Frank Welker – Copperhead, Flash, Freedom, Horrorshow, Junkyard, Polly, Short-Fuse, Timber, Torch, Wild-Bill, Rock 'n Roll, Cobra Trooper, Tele-Viper
- Stan Wojno – Lifeline
- Michael Yama – Torpedo
- Keone Young – Storm Shadow

== Crew ==
- Wally Burr - Voice Director
- Junichi Hayama - In between Animation
- Don Jurwich - Voice Director
- Russ Heath - Model Design
- Bruce Timm - Model Design (Season 1)

== Home media ==
=== VHS, Betamax and LaserDisc ===
Various episodes were released on home video by Family Home Entertainment in North America. A total of 12 numbered volumes were produced on VHS and Betamax from 1984 to 1986. Vol. 1 and 2 featured the first two mini-series, "The M.A.S.S. Device" and "The Revenge of Cobra" respectively, edited as feature-length movies, while Vol. 3 through 11 featured a single episode each from the first season. These tapes were originally released in clamshell cases packaged in large boxes and were subsequently reissued with standard cardboard sleeves. Vol. 12 contains three episodes, each preceded by a live-action introduction hosted by Sgt. Slaughter, although certain versions of this volume only contains two episodes. All 12 volumes featured comic book-like packaging artwork. The "Arise Serpentor, Arise" mini-series was later released as an edited feature-length movie on VHS and LaserDisc in 1991, making it the sole G.I. Joe release in the latter media format. Rhino Home Video would later acquire the home video rights to the series and release a second series of VHS tapes under their "Kid Rhino" branding. Nine volumes were released for general retail between 1999 and 2000, each containing two episodes (including two-part episodes). A tenth volume was released in 2001 as part of Blockbuster Video's exclusive "Kidmongous" series, which contained four episodes. Outside North America, episodes of G.I. Joe were also released on VHS in other countries by various local companies, with the Action Force version of the show receiving a total of 27 VHS releases in the United Kingdom.

=== DVD ===
In 2003-2004, Kid Rhino Entertainment (a subsidiary of AOL Time Warner) (a Warner Family Entertainment and WEA/Warner Music Group-distributed label) began releasing G.I. Joe: A Real American Hero on DVD in Region 1. They released the original two mini-series in 2003 followed by Season 1 in 2 volume sets in 2004. The first half of Season 2 was released in late 2004 but the remaining episodes were never released due to quality issues when the original DVDs were released (such as adding more newly created sound effects when watched in either 5.1 surround or monaural sound; the same audio retooling was done to the Transformers G1 DVD sets, also done by Rhino). These DVD sets have since gone out of print as Rhino lost the distribution rights. In 2008, Hasbro reacquired the worldwide distribution rights to the Sunbow library which includes G.I. Joe. During 2008 and 2009, Hasbro released five gift packs of cartoon-inspired action figures, each including a DVD. The first four sets included the four miniseries, and the fifth an assortment of Sunbow series episodes. In March 2009, Shout! Factory acquired the rights to re-release G.I. Joe on DVD in Region 1 with Vivendi Entertainment. They have subsequently released Season 1 in 3 volume sets. On July 22, 2009, they released G.I. Joe - A Real American Hero: Complete Collector's Set, a 17-disc themed boxset shaped like a military footlocker, featuring all 95 episodes and extensive bonus features including archival Hasbro toy commercials and a collectible 60-page book. The second and final season was released as a stand-alone set on April 27, 2010.

DVD name	Ep #	Release date
The Original Mini-Series: A Real American Hero and The Revenge of Cobra	10	May 13, 2003
Season 1, Part 1	27	January 27, 2004
Season 1, Part 2	18	June 29, 2004
Season 2, Part 1	15	August 17, 2004
Season 2, Part 1	22	July 14, 2009
The Complete Series Collector's Set	95	July 22, 2009
The M.A.S.S. Device	5	September 1, 2009
Season 1, Part 2	21	November 3, 2009
Season 1, Part 3	22	February 2, 2010
Season 2	30	April 27, 2010
The Complete First Series	95	June 26, 2012

=== UK VHS releases ===
- St. Michael Video (1987)
- Tempo Video (MSD Video, Tempo Super Video Then: Tempo Kids Club) (1987–1992)
- Collins Video (1989)

UK VHS releases
VHS title	VHS Studios	Release date	Episodes	Notes
Action Force – The Synthoid Conspiracy (Parts 1 & 2), Lights! Camera! Cobra!	St. Michael Video	1987	The Synthoid Conspiracy – Part 1, The Synthoid Conspiracy – Part 2, Lights! Camera! Cobra!	
Action Force – Captives of Cobra (Parts 1 & 2) and Eau de Cobra	Tempo Video (MSD Video)	1987	Captives of Cobra – Part 1, Captives of Cobra – Part 2, Eau de Cobra	
Action Force – Worlds Without End (Parts 1 & 2) and Flint's Vacation	Tempo Video (MSD Video)	1987	Worlds Without End – Part 1, Worlds Without End – Part 2, Flint's Vacation	
Action Force – The Pyramid of Darkness (Parts 1-5)	Tempo Video (MSD Video)	1987	The Pyramid of Darkness – Part 1, The Pyramid of Darkness – Part 2, The Pyramid of Darkness – Part 3, The Pyramid of Darkness – Part 4, The Pyramid of Darkness – Part 5	
Action Force – Arise, Serpentor, Arise! (Parts 1-5)	Tempo Video (MSD Video)	1988	Arise, Serpentor, Arise! - Part 1, Arise, Serpentor, Arise! - Part 2, Arise, Serpentor, Arise! - Part 3, Arise, Serpentor, Arise! - Part 4, Arise, Serpentor, Arise! - Part 5	Promo: Action Force, The Transformers, Robotix, Bigfoot and the Muscle Machines
Action Force: The Movie	Tempo Video (MSD Video)	September 19, 1988		
The Action Adventure Collection - Volume 1	Tempo Video (MSD Video)	1988	Action Force - Where the Reptiles Roam, Inhumanoids - Negative Polarity, The Transformers - Starscream's Brigade	
Action Force – Sink the Montana	Tempo Video (MSD Video)	September 19, 1988	Sink the Montana	This Video Also Contains Advertising 3 Action Force Toys Commercials, 3 Transformers Toys Commercials, Promo: Action Force The Movie, The Transformers, Action Adventure - Volume I, Jem, Sparky's Magic Piano, Spot's First Video, The Shoe People, MoonDreamers, Little Clowns of Happytown, My Little Pony And My Little Pony & Other Friends and Tempo tape cassettes
Action Force – Synthoid Conspiracy (Parts 1 & 2)	Tempo Video (MSD Video)	1989	Synthoid Conspiracy – Part 1, Synthoid Conspiracy – Part 2	
Action Force – Grey Hairs and Growing Pains & Into Your Tent I Will Silently	Tempo Video (MSD Video)	1989	Grey Hairs and Growing Pains, Into Your Tent I Will Silently	
Action Force – There's No Place Like Springfield (Parts 1 & 2), The Spy Who Rooked Me	Tempo Video (MSD Video)	1989	There's No Place Like Springfield – Part 1, There's No Place Like Springfield – Part 2, The Spy Who Rooked Me	
Action Force – Let's Play Soldier & Cold Slither	Tempo Video (MSD Video)	1989	Let's Play Soldier, Cold Slither	
Action Force – My Favorite Things	Collins Video	1989	My Favorite Things	
Action Force - The Most Dangerous Thing in the World & Once Upon a Joe	Tempo Video (MSD Video)	1989	The Most Dangerous Thing in the World, Once Upon a Joe	
The Action Adventure Collection - Volume 2	Tempo Video (MSD Video)	1989	The Transformers - Ghost in the Machine, Action Force - My Favorite Things, COPS - The Case of COPS File #1 - Part 1	

== Reception ==
In January 2009, IGN ranked G.I. Joe as number 19 on its list of the Top 100 Animated Series.

== See also ==
- Fensler Films
