= Wild Bill (G.I. Joe) =

Fictional character from G.I. Joe

- G.I. Joe character
- Wild Bill as seen in the Sunbow/Marvel G.I. Joe cartoon.
- First appearance: G.I. Joe #11 (May 1983)
- Voiced by: Frank Welker (Sunbow/Marvel); Don S. Davis (Spy Troops/Valor vs. Venom); Steven Blum (Resolute); Charlie Schlatter (Renegades); Ian James Corlett (G.I. Joe: Operation Blackout)

In-universe information
- Affiliation: G.I. Joe
- Specialty: Helicopter Pilot
- File name: Hardy, William S.
- Birth place: Brady, TX
- SN: RA056403211
- Rank: CW-4 (Chief Warrant Officer 4)
- Primary MOS: Helicopter Pilot
- Secondary MOS: Fixed Wing Pilot, Aircraft Armorer

Wild Bill is a fictional character from the G.I. Joe: A Real American Hero toyline, comic books, and animated series. He is the G.I. Joe Team's helicopter pilot and debuted in 1983.

== Profile ==
His real name is William S. Hardy, and his rank is that of army chief warrant officer CW-4. Wild Bill was born in Brady, Texas. His primary military specialty is helicopter pilot and his secondary military specialties are fixed wing pilot and aircraft armorer.

Wild Bill served during the Vietnam War in the role of a combat infantryman and also participated in LRRP operations. He reenlisted to attend the Flight Warrant Officer School and then remained in service, but his specialized training records are classified. Wild Bill joined the G.I. Joe Team as the pilot of the "Dragonfly" helicopter. He is a qualified expert in the M1911A auto pistol and the XM-16 attack rifle, but has a preference for single action .45 long colt revolvers.

Wild Bill is the original helicopter pilot for the G.I. Joe team, and is also an expert tracker and can function on the ground as well as any trained infantry scout. He is able to adapt the hunting skills he learned as a boy whenever he is tracking the enemy, saying that sneaking up on a Cobra is easier than sneaking up on most 'critters'.

Wild Bill has a hobby as a country-western singer. While personally honest, he enjoys telling tall tales for the amusement of his friends.

== Toy history ==
The character first appeared as part of the 1983 line of the G.I. Joe: A Real American Hero toy line. His action figure was bundled with the Dragonfly helicopter toy. A second edition action figure was released in 1992, and his function is re-designated as an Air Cavalry Scout. The figure was repainted and released as part of the Battle Corps line in 1993.

In 2002, a new figure was made utilizing the newer technology in articulation and detail. It was released as part of the G.I. Joe vs. Cobra series.

== Comics ==
=== Marvel Comics ===
In the Marvel Comics G.I. Joe series, Wild Bill first appeared in issue #11 (May 1983). He had a prominent role in the storylines despite serving mainly as a supporting character, and made the most appearances (eleven) in the Special Missions spinoff series. He often flies the Joes to their missions, either in the Dragonfly, the Tomahawk helicopter or the C-130 plane.

Wild Bill accompanies Snake Eyes to give Kwinn a burial at sea.

Wild Bill flies support for a multi-Joe mission investigating Cobra activity in the Florida Everglades. His helicopter is shot down by Destro's wrist rockets. He is injured in the crash and has to be medically evacuated. However, in the middle of this, in issue 27, he travels to New York City to help Scarlett hunt down Storm Shadow.

In the fourth issue of Special Missions, he and his team crash-land in a Southeast Asian jungle and had to battle the Oktober Guard and river pirates. His team consists of Leatherneck, Roadblock and Lifeline. Wild Bill is shot by the Guard but survives. Tensions arise because Leatherneck blames Lifeline, who is a pacifist. The Joes and the Guard are captured by river pirates. There, Wild Bill recovers enough to see Lifeline's forced battle with a Guard member and comment upon it. The Guard and the Joes are allowed to leave, sans the item they came for, because Lifeline's unwillingness to hurt the Guard member more than he had to impresses the pirates.

In one of Wild Bill's many helicopter missions, he almost kills the Cobra agents Tomax and Xamot. They escape with a turn down a sewer pipe.

Another instance was in G.I. Joe issues #68-71. Crazylegs, Wild Bill and Maverick were forced into evacuating several Dreadnoks out of Rio Vista, the capital of war-torn Sierra Gordo. The Dreadnoks Zarana, Thrasher and Monkeywrench had taken several nearby refugees hostage. Eventually, the Joes, Dreadnoks and refugees all work together to get to safety.

Wild Bill is the pilot for the mission where several Joes help Destro neutralize the bounty that Cobra Commander has put on his head. He is the pilot for a mission to the Bering Strait.

Wild Bill is featured in G.I. Joe Special Missions #16. He teams up with Maverick and other Joe pilots, such as Ace and Ghostrider in a recon mission over Cobra Island. He also shows a talent for ping pong.

=== Action Force ===
Wild Bill appears in many issues of the Marvel UK version of G.I. Joe, which is called 'Action Force'. In issue 26 he has a detailed memory of a previous military incident which he had repressed. His rescue mission had been forced to leave a man behind; this caused Wild Bill many sleepless nights.

=== Devil's Due ===
Wild Bill is featured in the first story arc of G.I. Joe: Frontlines, which presents the last adventure of the G.I. Joe Team. He flies air support in an attack on Destro's castle, which is filled with many Cobra officers. He has to end up dealing with a Cobra Mamba all by himself, with a battered and leaking helicopter. Much of this incident is off-panel.

When the team reforms, Wild Bill is one of the few Joes to be introduced to the "new generation", a large group of soldiers referred to as Greenshirts.

Wild Bill is one of the few Joes available, at the time, to assist Jinx. The mission is to infiltrate the organization of Japanese businessman Hayatu Toba, who is thought to be assembling a personal army of his own. He rejoins the main team alongside Cover Girl and Gung-Ho, during the World War III storyline. He helps in capturing Cobra Mortal. He assists in battling The Plague, a group of elite Cobra soldiers, in the Middle East.

In New York City, he again confronts The Plague, leading a group of volunteer citizens in laying down covering fire so Duke and a valued ally can escape. Several of The Plague are wounded. Wild Bill takes part in the final battle against Cobra in the Appalachian Mountains. Wild Bill is badly injured by Plague member Vector in a South American jungle, saving Stalker from Vector's unique weaponry by voluntarily taking the shots himself.

== Animated series ==
=== Sunbow ===
Wild Bill first appeared in the animated series in the "A Real American Hero" mini-series. The character's uniform had a different color scheme than in the comics and toy line. He was voiced by Frank Welker.

In the episode "Where the Reptiles Roam", Wild Bill goes undercover with Lady Jaye, Alpine and Bazooka to investigate a dude ranch in Texas that Cobra bought. There, he befriends a girl named Mary Belle, the daughter of the ranch's owners. He also lures a cattle stampede away from a nearby solar power control room (which was actually a distraction for Zartan to steal a computer chip inside) and performs a square dance song. Mary Belle soon reveals herself as the Baroness in disguise, but Wild Bill swiftly defeats her and Zartan as well. Wild Bill later saves the day for G.I. Joe in battle by leading a cattle stampede against Cobra.

==== G.I. Joe: The Movie ====
Wild Bill also appeared briefly in the 1987 animated film G.I. Joe: The Movie. Because he was a CWO-4, he served on the tribunal for Lt. Falcon's court-martial and piloted the helicopter (along with Lift-Ticket) to take Falcon to Sgt. Slaughter's training grounds, "The Slaughterhouse".

=== Spy Troops and Valor vs. Venom ===
Wild Bill appeared in the direct-to-video CGI animated movies G.I. Joe: Spy Troops and G.I. Joe: Valor vs. Venom, voiced by Don S. Davis.

=== Resolute ===
Wild Bill appeared in G.I. Joe: Resolute.

=== G.I. Joe: Renegades ===
Wild Bill made an appearance in the G.I. Joe: Renegades episode "Knockoffs." Flint calls for a helicopter to look for the Joes, Zartan, and a stolen Cobra truck with a camo suit along with Baroness and Lady Jaye.

== Live-action film ==
Wild Bill will be appearing in G.I. Joe: Ever Vigilant.

== Video games ==
Wild Bill is one of the featured characters in the 1985 G.I. Joe: A Real American Hero computer game. He appears as a non-playable supporting character in the 2009 video game G.I. Joe: The Rise of Cobra.
