= Snow Job (G.I. Joe) =

Character in G.I. Joe

- G.I. Joe character
- Snow Job as seen in the Sunbow/Marvel G.I. Joe animated series.
- First appearance: G.I. Joe #11 (May 1983)
- Voiced by: Rob Paulsen (Sunbow/Marvel); Nolan North (Renegades)

In-universe information
- Affiliation: G.I. Joe
- Specialty: Arctic Trooper
- File name: Moore, Harlan W.
- Birth place: Rutland, VT
- SN: RA773658456
- Rank: E-6 (Staff Sergeant) (1983); E-7 (Sergeant First Class) (1997)
- Primary MOS: Arctic Ski Patrol
- Secondary MOS: Rifle Instructor

Snow Job is a fictional character from the G.I. Joe: A Real American Hero toyline, comic books and animated series. He is the G.I. Joe Team's original arctic trooper and debuted in 1983.

== Profile ==
His real name is Harlan W. Moore, and his rank is that of staff sergeant E-6. Snow Job was born in West Rutland, Vermont.

Snow Job was a major contender for the Olympic Biathlon, who enlisted in the army to receive special training and support privileges, until deciding to join the G.I. Joe team. It's been suggested that he earned his nickname from having a reputation as being a con artist, more than from his primary military specialty on the arctic ski patrol. His secondary specialty is rifle instructor, and he is a qualified expert with all NATO long range sniper rifles, and the XMLR-3A laser rifle.

Unlike some of the other environment specialists on the G.I. Joe Team, Snow Job doesn't thrive on the cold, but he accepts that the chilly environments are the best place to showcase his incredible skills. He is considered one of the best marksmen on the team. He is known for setting up practical jokes, especially on new recruits.

== Toys ==
Snow Job was first released as an action figure in 1983.

== Comics ==
=== Marvel Comics ===
In the Marvel Comics G.I. Joe series, he first appeared in G.I. Joe: A Real American Hero #11 (May 1983). He helps the Joes secure weapons grade Plutonium that Cobra was trying to steal. He also tries a to run a minor scam against Rock'N'Roll via getting cash to set him up with Gung Ho's sister. After Doc explains the trick, the officer himself says 'This is why they call me 'Snow Job'".

Snow Job spies on the 'Bern Institute Of Reconstructive Surgery' and confirms Cobra operatives there.

Snow Job and Ripcord are injured when Cobra Hydrofoils destroy part of the G.I. Joe's mobile sea base. Doc treats them. Due to limited manpower at the moment, the two injured men as assigned as gunners on the 'W.H.A.L.E.' vehicle when the team assaults the newly formed Cobra Island. Legal maneuvering forces the Joe team to call off the attack.

Snow Job is featured in issue #20 of the series G.I. Joe Secret Missions. Along with Frostbite, Avalanche, and Wild Bill and Slip Stream for air support, Snow Job is part of a multi-national force investigating bizarre activity in the Arctic Circle near the Bering Strait. Snow Job personally destroys several manned Cobra vehicles.

== Animated series ==
=== Sunbow ===
He first appeared in the G.I. Joe animated series in the mini-series "A Real American Hero", voiced by Rob Paulsen.

Snow Job had a major role in the episode "Haul Down the Heavens", in which he, Flint and Lady Jaye escort a group of scientists to the Arctic Circle to investigate abnormal behavior of the aurora borealis. There, a pursuit of a polar bear leads to Flint and Snow Job finding a Cobra base. While attempting to steal a Fang helicopter, Snow Job wrestles and defeats a Cobra Trooper, but is pricked by tranquilizer darts. While unconscious, Snow Job is saved by an indigenous man who takes him to his village. The man radios G.I. Joe headquarters, allowing Rip Cord to find him and restore him to health with a serum.

In "Iceberg Goes South", Snow Job accidentally destroys Wet-Suit's diving suit performance monitor. The two Joes are later sent to rescue Iceberg at Doctor Mindbender's nearby lab. Snow Job is captured, but Wet-Suit rescues him shortly after.

He was featured in one of the series' famous "And Knowing Is Half the Battle" Public Service Announcements, warning kids of the dangers of venturing out onto "frozen" ponds or lakes which may not be entirely frozen. He advises them to rescue a fellow kid by using something that may reach him.

=== G.I. Joe: The Movie ===
Snow Job also appeared briefly in the 1987 animated film G.I. Joe: The Movie. He participates in the first battle for the Broadcast Energy Transmitter (B.E.T.), and is part of Roadblock's unit of Joes who pursue Cobra afterwards. When they are defeated by the forces of Cobra-La, Snow Job attempts to escape in his H.A.V.O.C., but is captured along with the other Joes.

=== Renegades ===
Snow Job appears in the G.I. Joe: Renegades episode "White Out", voiced by Nolan North. Harlan Moore is an old war pal of Tunnel Rat who lives alone in an isolated area in Canada. He earned his nickname for his tendency to trick his friends into schemes and is good at playing poker. He allows G.I. Joe to stay with him for the night, but is very cold to them. Tunnel Rat explains to the Joes that in the past, he, Snow Job and Frostbite were in an arctic warfare unit and good friends; Snow Job always engaged in pleasurable activities, even bending the rules at times, including going on an unsanctioned skiing trip which led to an avalanche burying Frostbite (who presumably died). Following the ski trip, Snow Job was transferred to another group as a punishment and left the Army. He is still disappointed and suffering from survivor guilt in the present. Snow Job ends up assisting the Joes in their fight against Storm Shadow and the Shadow Vipers, even blowing up his own house in order to let the Joes escape. He survives and escapes with them. Snow Job eventually leaves for another location with his new pet wolf, Timber.

== Video games ==
Snow Job is one of the featured characters in the 1985 G.I. Joe: A Real American Hero computer game. He appears as a non-playable supporting character in the 2009 video game G.I. Joe: The Rise of Cobra.

== Other media ==
- A parody of Snow Job appears in the Robot Chicken episode "Day at the Circus", voiced by Seth Green. When Flint, Gung-Ho, and Roadblock go to fight in the jungle, Snow Job was left behind since his outfit would make him a shootable target. He then gets a call from Swiss President Samuel Smith that the Swiss Alps are overrun with Yetis and Snow Job goes there only to turn out to be a prank by the other G.I. Joe members and Samuel Smith. Flint, Gung-Ho, and Roadblock later apologize to him for that prank and he ends up with a mission to shovel snow outside their base. In the episode "More Blood, More Chocolate", Snow Job commented that he was okay with the cold during the hockey tournament in the North Pole in the "Inside the Battlefield" segment that revolved around G.I. Joe's fight for the Weather Dominator.
