= Steeler (G.I. Joe) =

Character from the G.I. Joe franchise

- G.I. Joe character
- Steeler as seen in the Sunbow/Marvel G.I. Joe cartoon.
- First appearance: 1982
- Voiced by: Chris Latta (Sunbow/Marvel); Eddie Mata (Renegades)

In-universe information
- Affiliation: G.I. Joe
- Specialty: Tank Commander
- File name: Pulaski, Ralph W.
- Birth place: Pittsburgh, PA
- SN: RA035336098
- Rank: O-1 (Second Lieutenant) (1982); O-2 (First Lieutenant) (2007)
- Primary MOS: Armor
- Secondary MOS: Artillery, Transportation

Steeler is a fictional character from the G.I. Joe: A Real American Hero toyline, comic books and animated series. He is the G.I. Joe Team's original tank commander and debuted in 1982.

== Profile ==
His real name is Ralph W. Pulaski, and his rank is that of Army 1st lieutenant O-2. His original rank was O-1 or 2nd Lieutenant. Steeler was born in Pittsburgh, Pennsylvania.

His primary military specialty is armor officer and his secondary military specialties are artillery and transportation officer (88A). Steeler came from a blue collar middle-class family and got himself into college through an ROTC scholarship and the money he earned as a heavy equipment operator. Graduated top of class from Armor School at Fort Knox, and received special training as part of the Cadre X-AFV Project at the Aberdeen Proving Ground, artillery school at Fort Sill, AFV Desert Exercise at Fort Hood, and the Covert Ops school at Langley. Steeler is proficient with all NATO and Warsaw Pact AFVs, and is a qualified expert with the M-16, M1911A1 Auto Pistol, the MAC-10 and the Uzi submachine gun.

Steeler was originally a tank commander for the "M.O.B.A.T." tank (Motorized Battle Assault Tank). He is young and reckless, and often conflicts with authority figures (including superior officers). He often challenges teammates to physical endurance tasks; he respects people more this way.

== Toys ==
Steeler was first released in 1982, packaged with the MOBAT (Motorized Battle Tank). In 2004, Steeler was released as part of a three-pack of figures, the others being General Flagg and a Cobra Officer. It was packaged with a reprint of issue #5 of G.I. Joe: A Real American Hero, in which all three were featured. In 2007, Steeler had a release as part of the International G.I. Joe convention, which took place in Atlanta, Georgia.

== Comics ==
=== Marvel Comics ===
In the Marvel comics G.I. Joe series, he appears in the first issue, along with the rest of the original team. They raid a Cobra facility to rescue a peace activist, Dr. Adele Burkhardt. Steeler is featured in issue #5 as he and his tank team were threatened by Cobra forces in the middle of a crowded New York City during an Armed Forces parade. Steeler, along with Clutch and Breaker, have no ammunition for the tank, so they utilize nonlethal methods to defeat Cobra and save innocent lives. For example, the popping of Breaker's gum in the P.A. system convinces many Cobras that the tank has ammo. The crew rams the VIP stand, uncovering Cobra Commander's influence. The enemy leader himself escapes.

Steeler and the tank are again featured in issue 28. Teaming up with Clutch, Breaker and two Florida police officers, they fight Cobra influence in swamps of the Everglades.

The original Joes are transferred to administrative duty by General Austin, to watch over all the new recruits. Despite this, Steeler is one of the many Joes, including Clutch and Heavy Metal, to work security as mechanics in the Joe's operative cover facility, the Chaplain's Assistant Motor Pool. Steeler and the other administrators are put back on active duty for the invasion of Springfield, a Cobra-controlled town.

After a public relations fiasco arises from a raid on Cobra Island most of the G.I. Joe team is arrested. Steeler and many other G.I. Joe members, such as Bazooka, Jinx, Wet-Suit and Snow-Job, manage to go underground, then meeting up at Burkhart's house. Steeler participates in a raid on a government controlled hospital with the intention of rescuing the commander of the G.I. Joe team, General Hawk and his ally, General Hollingsworth. The situation quickly devolves into a firefight, with Destro saving the day due to respect for Hawk.

=== Devil's Due comics ===
Steeler returns for the series printed by Devil's Due comics. He is one of the many Joe soldiers called back into active duty to fight against Serpentor in the second Cobra civil war. Like the first one, this takes place on Cobra Island.

Steeler is featured in a flashback series examining the early days of the Joe team. General Flagg reveals Steeler was recruited partly because of an incident where he survived an attack on a humanitarian mission by killing all of the attackers. He then carried a wounded ally out through the desert. Unfortunately, the injured man did not survive.

Steeler is briefly seen in a re-examining of Snake Eyes' origin story, specifically the point where he falls during training with Scarlett.

=== IDW Publishing ===
Steeler works with Wildcard and Cover Girl in a training exercise against the reformed Oktober Guard. They become caught up in factional fighting and must work together to protect innocent civilians who are in danger of being slaughtered.

In the IDW "Cobra: Civil War" story arc, it is revealed Steeler is a deep-cover Cobra agent feeding information to Major Bludd. He kills two Joes to protect his identity and severely injures three more. To protect Cobra interests, Steeler is then slain by Cobra agent Blacklight.

== Animated series ==
=== Sunbow ===
Steeler first appeared in the 1983 cartoon G.I. Joe: A Real American Hero five part mini-series called "The MASS Device". He was voiced by Chris Latta.

By the time of the two-part episode "Worlds Without End", Steeler had grown weary of the seemingly endless G.I. Joe/Cobra struggle, and questioned whether it would really matter if Cobra were to win. He mentions that his girlfriend left him due to his service and considers quitting the Joe team. Steeler is later among a group of Joes who were teleported to an alternate version of Earth, in which G.I. Joe had been all but wiped out and Cobra had conquered the world. Steeler is bitten by one of Destro's mutant bugs, becoming sick and delirious as a result, and also discovers that Cobra had killed the alternate Steeler, apparently in a weapons test. The only surviving "Joe" in this reality is the Baroness, who is a double-agent and the lover of the alternate-Steeler. The Baroness cures Steeler of his disease, and helps the Joes return to their timeline. Having seen the horrors of this alternate world, Steeler has an epiphany—it did matter whether Cobra won or lost. Steeler, Clutch, and Grunt elect to stay in the alternate reality in order to re-build G.I. Joe. As Steeler never returned from the alternate-reality, and no further stories were set there, Steeler never reappeared in the Sunbow series continuity.

==== G.I. Joe: The Movie ====
Despite his absence in the series from "Worlds Without End" onward, Steeler briefly appears in the 1987 animated film G.I. Joe: The Movie, in which he is seen on a guard tower.

==== G.I. Joe: Renegades ====
Steeler first appears in the 2011 G.I. Joe: Renegades episode "Rage", voiced by Eddie Mata. He was first seen as one of the war veterans that fell victim to the experiments conducted by Destro and Scrap-Iron. After the veterans recovered, Steeler thanks G.I. Joe and vows to help them when they need his services.

== Video games ==
Steeler is one of the featured characters in the 1985 G.I. Joe: A Real American Hero computer game.
