= Buzz Dixon =

American writer

- Occupation: Writer
- Children: 2

Buzz Dixon is an American writer of comic books, film, and cartoons. He has written comics for multiple companies, including Eclipse Comics (where he wrote Destroyer Duck alongside Steve Gerber), Marvel Comics, and a Buck Rogers adaptation for TSR, Inc.

His cartoon work includes both writing and editing credits. He wrote numerous episodes of GI Joe: A Real American Hero, The Transformers, Thundarr the Barbarian, Jem, Inhumanoids, Alvin and the Chipmunks, Tiny Toon Adventures, Tarzan and the Super 7 (the Web Woman installments), Visionaries: Knights of the Magical Light, Dungeons & Dragons and Teen Wolf. He also served as a story editor for the GI Joe and Teen Wolf series, and was a story consultant on G.I. Joe: The Movie and My Little Pony: The Movie.

== Screenwriting credits ==
- series head writer denoted in bold

=== Television ===
- Web Woman (1978)
- The Freedom Force (1978)
- The New Shmoo (1979)
- The Plastic Man Comedy/Adventure Show (1979-1980)
- Heathcliff (1980)
- Thundarr the Barbarian (1980-1981)
- Goldie Gold and Action Jack (1981)
- Alvin and the Chipmunks (1983)
- Dungeons & Dragons (1983)
- Mister T (1983)
- Mighty Orbots (1984)
- **G.I. Joe: A Real American Hero** (1985-1986): season 2 head writer
- The Transformers (1985-1986)
- Inhumanoids (1986)
- **Teen Wolf** (1986-1987)
- Bionic Six (1987)
- Spiral Zone (1987)
- Visionaries: Knights of the Magical Light (1987)
- BraveStarr (1988)
- Garbage Pail Kids (1988)
- Jem (1988)
- Superman (1988)
- Police Academy: The Animated Series (1988)
- Chip'n Dale: Rescue Rangers (1989)
- Teenage Mutant Ninja Turtles (1989)
- Tiny Toon Adventures (1990)
- Batman: The Animated Series (1992)
- Conan the Adventurer (1992)
- My Little Pony Tales (1992)
- Wild West C.O.W.-Boys of Moo Mesa (1993)
- Transformers: Generation 2 (1993)
- G.I. Joe Extreme (1995)

=== Film ===
- G.I. Joe: The Movie (1987)
