= Stalker (G.I. Joe) =

Fictional character from G.I. Joe

- G.I. Joe character
- First appearance: G.I. Joe: A Real American Hero #1 (June 1982)
- Voiced by: Arthur Burghardt (Sunbow/Marvel); Lee Jeffrey (DiC); Charlie Adler (Resolute); Andrew Kishino (Renegades); Dave B. Mitchell (Rise of Cobra)

In-universe information
- Affiliation: G.I. Joe
- Specialty: Ranger
- File name: Wilkinson, Lonzo R.
- Birth place: Detroit, Michigan
- SN: RA725054399
- Rank: E-5 (Sergeant) (1982); E-6 (Staff Sergeant) (Marvel comics); E-7 (Sergeant First Class) (1989); E-8 (First Sergeant) (1997); E-9 (Sergeant Major) (Devil's Due comics)
- Primary MOS: Infantry
- Secondary MOS: Medic, Interpreter
- Subgroups: Talking Battle Commanders; Tiger Force; Desert Patrol Squad

Stalker is a fictional character from the G.I. Joe: A Real American Hero toyline, comic books, and animated series. He is the G.I. Joe Team's original ranger and debuted in 1982. He is sometimes called "Sgt. Stalker" on toys. He was the first African-American character in G.I. Joe: A Real American Hero.

== Profile ==
His real name is Lonzo R. Wilkinson, and his rank is that of Sergeant Major. His original rank was that of sergeant E-5. Stalker was born in Detroit. He was the first Ranger selected to the G.I. Joe team.

His primary military specialty is infantry and his secondary military specialties are interpreter and medic. Stalker was the leader of a large urban street gang in Detroit before enlisting in the Army. He graduated top of his class in basic combat training and advanced infantry training. Stalker also received special training at the U.S. Army Language School in Monterey, Intelligence School at Ft. Holabird and Ranger School at Ft. Benning. He is fluent in Spanish, French, Arabic, and Swahili. He served in the same L.R.R.P. as Snake Eyes and Storm Shadow. Stalker is also a qualified jump instructor and a qualified expert in all NATO and Warsaw Pact small arms. He is a qualified expert with the M-14, M-16, M1911A1 Auto Pistol, M-3A1 grease gun, and the M-32 "Pulverizer" sub-machine gun.

His fluency in foreign languages coupled with his experience in commanding other people made him a valuable asset, and after joining the G.I. Joe Team, he often served as leader in their many missions.

He is one of very few characters from the first line of the toys to have a distinct appearance from the other action figures, as he is African-American. Stalker was a major character in the G.I. Joe comic book series published by Marvel Comics, and has also been featured in the series from Devil's Due Publishing. In the animated series, however, he received very little screen time after the first mini-series, and is absent from the later series, G.I. Joe: Sigma 6.

== A Real American Hero Toy history ==
As of 2011, there have been 19 figures released of Stalker. In 2002, Stalker was renamed Sgt. Stalker. He was also released once as Lonzo R. Wilkinson, from before he was a member of G.I. Joe.

=== Vintage/Modern ===
Stalker was one of the original figures released carded in the first series in 1982. Like all of the original sixteen figures, Stalker was released with "straight arms", and his head only could turn left and right. The 1989 release of Stalker came with a white kayak. The 1991 release was part of the "Talking Battle Commanders" group, and featured several phrases that were spoken when one of the buttons on his backpack were pressed. A new version of Stalker was released in 1994 as part of the Battle Corps line.

In 2004, he was released as part of the Toys R Us exclusive "Desert Patrol Squad" set, which also included the figures Ambush, Dusty, Gung Ho, Snake Eyes and Tunnel Rat.

=== 25th Anniversary ===
In 2007, Sgt. Stalker was released as part of the 25th anniversary. His new design was based on his original 1982 figure. This mold was reused for his 2008 release, which was packaged with the DVD Battles Pack, set 1 of 5. The mold was again used for his 2008 release with a green JUMP jet pack as part of the Target exclusive Ultimate Battle Pack.

== Comics ==
=== Marvel Comics ===
Stalker first appeared in the Marvel Comics series G.I. Joe: A Real American Hero #1 (June 1982). Prior to joining G.I. Joe, he served on the same LRRP team as Snake Eyes and Storm Shadow during their tour in the Vietnam War Their experiences, including a firefight meant to rescue an injured Snake Eyes, made them the best of friends. After their tour, only Stalker stayed in the military, while Snake Eyes and Storm Shadow went on a long sabbatical training in the art of the ninja. Years later, Stalker, along with Hawk, would be responsible for selecting the members that would comprise the original Joe team. Stalker serves as field commander and second-in-command of the G.I. Joe team until Duke is brought in to replace him. Along with eight of the original Joes, Stalker was promoted one rank.

Stalker's friendship with Snake Eyes affects circumstances during a mission in Sierra Gordo. Stalker leads a rescue of Snake Eyes. He again has a flashback to the time Snake Eyes was rescued from under Viet Cong fire. As the Joe team leaves, Stalker himself is badly injured by the Crimson Twins. Against his protests, he is evacuated as Snake Eyes stays back to hold off Cobra soldiers. As the other Joes inform him, he is no longer team leader due to his injuries and they must follow the orders of the next highest-ranking officer, which is Snake Eyes. Both men survive this incident.

Stalker's most trying moment was when he and his team were captured by Borovian authorities after a mission gone awry. Only Outback manages to escape, under orders and under protest. Snow Job and Quick-Kick are imprisoned with Stalker for several months in a brutal Borovian prison camp. Snow-Job comes close to dying when he falls ill. The United States disavows any knowledge of their mission. Scarlett and Snake Eyes fake their own death and join with Storm Shadow in an illegal mission. All of the Joes escape with the aid of the freedom fighter called the White Clown.

Stalker, Snow Job, and Quick Kick emerge back home to a crowd of dozens of Joes. All three specifically search out Outback to reassure him that he did the right thing.

Stalker helps spearhead a G.I. Joe mission to the fictional country of Wolkekuck-Uckland when it comes under threat by Cobra forces.

Stalker stayed on, serving with the G.I. Joe Team until its disbandment in 1994.

=== Devil's Due ===
The Devil's Dues G.I. Joe series loosely continues the original storyline, opening with the reinstatement of the G.I. Joe team in 2002. The newer series is ambiguous with references to the Vietnam War, implying that characters such as Stalker may have been serving in a different conflict in Southeast Asia at a later time in history (so that the characters and storyline are timeless rather than being limited to only two decades of storytelling).

After G.I. Joe was disbanded in 1994 (at the end of the Marvel series), Stalker stayed in the military, serving for a brief time as a recruiter in his hometown of Detroit. In 2001, the G.I. Joe team was reinstated in response to Cobra's return to the United States. Under the leadership of his old comrade, Duke, many of the older Joes, including Stalker, were brought back to help train and lead a batch of new recruits. Stalker later took part in the Joes' assault on Cobra Island to fight the forces of a revived Serpentor.

Eventually, the team's roster was cut down to only a dozen Joes, including Stalker. That small team defended the new Pit against Cobra's attack, but Stalker and most of the team members were quickly reassigned to other units. Shortly after, the G.I. Joe team was again disbanded by the military but later, under the leadership of General Joseph Colton, Stalker was reactivated along with seven other Joes to continue counter terrorism activity.

=== IDW ===
Stalker is featured in a stand-alone story where he fears he is losing his combat effectiveness due to night terrors. After successfully rescuing innocent hostages with the assistance of Zap and Shipwreck, Stalker regains his confidence in his own abilities. In an alternate continuity storyline, Stalker has to work with trained soldiers and civilians alike, simply to survive Cobra Commander's murderous control over most of the free world.

== Animated series ==
=== Sunbow ===
He first appeared in the G.I. Joe animated series in Part 1 of "The MASS Device" mini-series. He made several appearances in episodes of the first season of the Sunbow animated series.

=== DiC ===
Stalker appeared in the DiC G.I. Joe series in the "Operation Dragonfire" mini-series, voiced by Lee Jeffrey.

=== G.I. Joe: Resolute ===
Stalker appeared in G.I. Joe: Resolute, voiced by Charlie Adler.

=== G.I. Joe: Renegades ===
Stalker appears in the G.I. Joe: Renegades episode "Homecoming, Part 2", voiced by Andrew Kishino. During a flashback, he is seen leading a squad of soldiers intercepting gun runners in a jungle. A member of his team, Duke disobeys his orders after Lady Jaye's helicopter is shot down. He is referred to as "Stalker One" in the sequence.

== Video games ==
Stalker is one of the featured characters in the 1985 G.I. Joe: A Real American Hero computer game. He is a non-playable supporting character in the 1992 game G.I. Joe: The Atlantis Factor, and in the 2009 video game G.I. Joe: The Rise of Cobra.
