= G.I. Joe: Resolute =

American animated television series

- GI Joe: Resolute logo
- Genre: Military science fiction
- Based on: G.I. Joe by Hasbro
- Written by: Warren Ellis
- Directed by: Joaquim Dos Santos
- Voices of: Charlie Adler; Eric Bauza; Steve Blum; Grey DeLisle
- Composer: Stephen Barton
- Country of origin: United States
- Original language: English
- No. of seasons: 1
- No. of episodes: 11

Production
- Executive producers: Sam Register; Steve Drucker and Brian Goldner (for Hasbro); Chris Prynoski and Shannon Prynoski (for Titmouse)
- Producer: Jackie Buscarino
- Editor: Felipe Salazar
- Running time: 4-5 minutes
- Production companies: Titmouse, Inc. Hasbro

Original release
- Network: Adult Swim Video
- Release: April 17 – April 25, 2009

G.I. Joe: Resolute is an American anime-influenced adult animated web series based on the G.I. Joe franchise. It was written by Warren Ellis, directed by Joaquim Dos Santos, and produced by Sam Register, creator of Cartoon Network's Hi Hi Puffy AmiYumi and The Looney Tunes Show. It debuted on the web at Adult Swim Video on April 17, 2009, as a series of ten 5-minute episodes and a final 10-minute episode, with a content rating of TV-14-V, and later premiered as a movie on Adult Swim on April 25, 2009. The show has a darker and more realistic tone compared to other installments in the franchise, and also uses elements from both the cartoons and the comics. It is described by Warren Ellis as a "fusion".

== Plot ==
Major Bludd's dead body is found by police at the Lincoln Memorial, with a knife through his heart. His fingerprints are then scanned by a CSI tech who is revealed to be Scarlett.

In the Pacific Ocean the USS Flagg, a modified aircraft carrier, falls prey to a saboteur. Explosives rigged in vital areas destroy almost all on board weapons, ammunition, and vehicles, in addition to severely compromising the vessel's integrity. Bazooka had been killed prior to the attack while on guard duty. Doc uncovers a note hidden in Bazooka's mouth, which reveals the assassin to be Storm Shadow, a former friend of Snake Eyes from his time training as a ninja for the Arashikage Clan. Snake Eyes, after reading the scroll's hidden note, departs to confront Storm Shadow and settle their rivalry once and for all.

After repeated attempts to seize power through brute force have failed, Cobra Commander comes up with a new plan to recover Cobra's financial investments, and seize control of world power at the same time. The plan begins with the seizure of the High Frequency Active Auroral Research Program array (HAARP), which superheats the ionosphere. Following this, hundreds of rockets carrying solar powered stratellites are launched into low Earth orbit, forming an entire network just below the ionosphere, allowing Cobra to maintain a covert worldwide communication network. Finally, at a decommissioned nuclear missile silo in Siberia, a prototype particle beam weapon is unveiled.

The Cobra operative Firefly fires a special missile package through the wall of the United Nations building in Manhattan, NY, which deploys a small holographic projector. Cobra Commander uses the projector to broadcast a message to the assembled UN representatives, in which he demands that all nations on earth turn control of their resources over to the Cobra organization within 24 hours, or face indiscriminate destruction of their major cities. As a show of force, the cannon is fired at Moscow, Russia, destroying the city and killing approximately ten million people.

Meanwhile, the other Joes on board the Flagg learn from Dial Tone that satellite communications are down due to the superheated ionosphere, and eventually trace Cobra's activity to the HAARP array, the satellites, and the Siberian particle cannon, which lies beneath the decommissioned Russian ballistic missile complex. Logistical personnel explain that the HAARP array allows the particle cannon to superheat the ionosphere, causing it to reflect particles. The energy from those charged particles is dispersed across the super-hot ionosphere, and then reassembled above its intended target. Once there, the particles are focused into a powerful collimated beam, which uses charged particles to wipe entire cities off the map.

Cobra Commander warns his troops that sedition against his authority will not be tolerated, and recounts how he killed Major Bludd himself, for such an attempt.

Three separate Joe teams are deployed: The first team consisting of Gung-Ho, Roadblock, Stalker and Beach Head manages to recapture the HAARP array in Alaska, and free hostages being held by Destro and the Baroness. The second team consists of Ripcord, Duke and Scarlett. Duke and Scarlett perform a HALO jump to the Siberian facility wearing winged jet packs. They infiltrate the location, kill Zartan, and destroy the location by forcing the repurposed nuclear warheads powering the particle cannon to detonate. Tunnel Rat leads the third team and manages to knock out Cobra's orbiting stratellite network by reviving technology from Project Manhigh, building an assault platform capable of reaching the stratellite array, without activating each stratellite's defensive cannons. He then uses a microwave power transmission broadcast via the stratellite's rectenna to compromise and destroy the network. However, Cobra Commander unveils a second smaller HAARP array on an islet in Micronesia, and a second lesser particle cannon hidden in the town of Springfield, a major Cobra installation. Cobra fires this secondary particle cannon at the Flagg, sinking the already evacuated carrier. Elsewhere, Snake Eyes and Storm Shadow meet on an island, containing an abandoned complex that was once used by Snake Eyes' ninja clan. In flashbacks, Snake Eyes recalls his time as a student, and how he unsuccessfully attempted to prevent his mentor's assassination at the hands of Zartan who was working under Storm Shadow's orders. Snake Eyes and Storm Shadow engage in a fight to the death, a fight that ends with Storm Shadow's defeat.

Over the Pacific Ocean, several aircraft carrying the evacuated Joes and crew members of the Flagg arrive at the location of the secondary particle cannon. After exchanging fire with Cobra forces, Flint and Scarlett manage to create an opening, allowing Duke and Snake Eyes to gain access to the facility. Duke makes his way to the control center, and discovers that Cobra Commander ordered his men to aim the particle cannon at Washington, DC, then killed them, and locked himself inside a safe room within the control center. Unable to prevent the firing of the particle cannon, Duke elects to reprogram the targeting coordinates, causing the directed-energy weapon to fire on its own location, Springfield. However, after the blast, Cobra Commander's whereabouts are unknown, as his safe room was found empty, as documented by Duke in his final report.

A post credits scene shows Storm Shadow's grave to be empty.

== Cast ==
- Charlie Adler as Cobra Commander, Stalker, Flint, Gung-Ho, Hard Master, Cop
- Eric Bauza as Storm Shadow, Destro, Tunnel Rat, Cobra Soldier
- Steve Blum as Duke, Roadblock, Wild Bill, Ripcord, Zartan, Doc, Operator, Technician
- Grey DeLisle as Scarlett, Dial Tone, Baroness, Cover Girl

== Production ==
English writer Warren Ellis scripted the series. He was initially unfamiliar with the American franchise and was informed the franchise was related to Action Man, a subject he had knowledge of.

"Sam Register phoned me up and said, we’d really like you to write a G.I. Joe animation, at a PG-13 rating, aimed at an older viewer. I said, I’ve never seen a G.I. Joe cartoon in my life. [...] I know nothing about G.I. Joe. It is meaningless in my world. 'Excellent', Sam said. Just the guy we need. It was hard not to notice, at this point, that Sam Register is crazier than a shithouse rat. Therefore I decided to take the job."

— Ellis describing his recruitment for the project. (2009)

He stated that his intention was to "really put the property and the characters through some shift changes: as if this were the G.I. Joe film (at the time of my writing Resolute, there still wasn’t a locked script on the live-action film) and I was rebooting and re-grounding the property on my own". He described Hasbro as being supportive, allowing him to do everything except obliterate Beijing (obliterating Moscow was considered "fine"). He was allowed to alter a number of characters, both for budgetary reasons and to "amuse [himself]".

For budgetary reasons, a number of Joes did not get speaking parts: "Voice actors cost money. I originally wrote WAY too many speaking roles, and had to remove a bunch of them in the second draft of Resolute, move some dialogue from excised characters to remaining characters, and so on."

The series created a female Dial-Tone. Originally, she was just a background character but, due to the amount of dialogue she had, the producers said she should be a Joe. Ellis chose the codename Dial-Tone "because it amused [him]".

== Reception ==
Bruce Kirkland writing for the Toronto Sun branded the series as "impressive". He opined that its stylisation was a "hybrid of American cartooning and Japanese anime" for adults. John Latchem of Home Media Magazine described the series as a "harder-edged" version of the 1980s cartoon. Joseph Baxter writing for TV station G4 said that they "clearly marked their territory" with young adult demographic and were "running full speed" with a mature theme. They concluded that after a character was murdered "they go all CSI on his body - Wow". The Toronto Star also agreed with the series' adult-oriented cartoon status and quipped "yes, people actually die, including a Joe." Scott Thil of Wired said the series "primed the pump" ready for the live-action film G.I. Joe: The Rise of Cobra. He also faux-criticised the series' use of realistic weapons because it made the original series "look as bad as it was".

== Toyline ==
In 2009, a number of G.I. Joe toys were released with filecards that referenced the Resolute series. This included 25th Anniversary-style figures of Cobra Commander, Cobra Trooper and Duke. A five-figure "Resolute" box set was also released, with Cobra Commander, Cobra B.A.T., Cobra Officer, Cobra Trooper and Duke, repainted in colors from the cartoon series. Two "Comic book 2-packs" were released, one with Destro and Shockblast, and one with Storm Shadow and Tunnel Rat. Both comic packs included G.I. Joe: Resolute comic books, with new stories by Larry Hama. In 2010, a Cobra 7 figure pack, and G.I. Joe 7 figure pack were released. Hasbro had planned to release a USS Flagg model to the line, however they decided against its release. The prototype was later showcased at the 2011 G.I. Joe convention.
