= Tunnel Rat (G.I. Joe) =

Character from G.I. Joe

- G.I. Joe character
- Illustration of Tunnel Rat from G.I. Joe: Order of Battle. Art by Herb Trimpe.
- First appearance: G.I. Joe: A Real American Hero #59 (May 1987)
- Voiced by: Laurie Faso (G.I. Joe: The Movie); Michael Sinterniklaas (Sigma 6, Season One), Sebastian Arcelus (Sigma 6, Season Two); Eric Bauza (Resolute); Matthew Yang King (Renegades)

In-universe information
- Affiliation: G.I. Joe
- Specialty: Explosive Ordnance Disposal Specialist
- File name: Lee, Nicky
- Birth place: Trinidad and Tobago
- SN: 367-84-9090
- Rank: E-6 (Staff Sergeant)
- Primary MOS: Explosive Ordnance Disposal
- Secondary MOS: Combat Engineer
- Subgroups: Night Force; Sonic Fighters; Desert Patrol Squad

Tunnel Rat is a fictional character from the G.I. Joe: A Real American Hero toyline, comic books and animated series. He is the G.I. Joe Team's Explosive Ordnance Disposal specialist and debuted in 1987.

== Character biography ==
Tunnel Rat's real name is Nicky Lee, and his rank is that of sergeant E-5. Tunnel Rat is of Trinidadian Chinese descent and lived in Brooklyn, New York prior to joining the US Army. He graduated from the Army Ranger School at Fort Benning and served time in Grenada. Tunnel Rat specializes in explosive ordnance disposal and is familiar with most NATO and Warsaw Pact explosive devices and small arms.

The character's facial appearance and military specialty is based upon G.I. Joe comic book writer Larry Hama, who was an EOD specialist for two tours of duty during the Vietnam War.

== Comics ==
=== Marvel Comics ===
Tunnel Rat made his Marvel Comics series debut in issue #59 (May 1987) of G.I. Joe: A Real American Hero, in which he was assigned for security to Thunder, Clutch, and Grand Slam. The entire team had been out for some time testing equipment. Tunnel Rat teaches Grand Slam all about the Joe credit cards, as the latter had been having problems with receiving his pay. The group joins up with Dusty, Crankcase, Hawk, Cross-Country, and Outback to take the equipment to Fort Carson, but Tunnel Rat's new payment method gets them attacked by Cobra forces. The Crimson Guardsman Fred VII, Raptor, and Cobra Commander track down the Joe convoy via Tunnel Rat's credit records, old intelligence and the abilities of Raptor's birds. Cobra Commander attacks the entire team in a Pogo Plane. Due to the limited maneuverability of the mountains, the battle is precarious for both sides. Clutch's driving skills saves the day but Cobra Commander escapes with the knowledge that Tunnel Rat has unwittingly given him.

Tunnel Rat often serves as pointman in missions where the Joes have to travel through tunnels and sewer channels. He does so during the Cobra Island civil war in Issues #74-76; his expertise helps his fellow recon teammates escape from Cobra soldiers, and, in other instances, Iron Grenadiers. He and other Joes come into conflict with the Iron Grenadiers in Special Missions #23, when the Joes give their newest recruit, Scoop, a hard time because he barely meets Joe standards. However, Scoop later saves the life of a wounded Tunnel Rat by defeating an Iron Grenadier in hand-to-hand combat, which earns him the respect of all the other Joes.

=== Devil's Due ===
When G.I. Joe was reinstated as seen in the Devil's Due comics, Tunnel Rat returned as a reservist. He was called into action to help battle the returned Serpentor. When Joe, Cobra, and the Coil battled it out on Cobra Island, Tunnel Rat was part of Assault Team Beta. After the conflict, Tunnel Rat was part of a group of Joes tracking down a mysterious invasion in Sierra Gordo. Tunnel Rat was wounded during the mission and had a lengthy recovery. By the time he fully healed, the team had disbanded in the wake of the battle against the Red Shadows.

=== America's Elite/Devil's Due ===
Tunnel Rat returned to reserve status. He was called into action to help a group of Joes infiltrate an abandoned Cobra facility in New York City. During the World War 3 storyline, Tunnel Rat was reactivated again, this time he deployed to South America alongside Footloose, Beach Head, Lift Ticket, Rapid Fire, and Windmill. As the main team moved to attack Cobra forces in the Appalachian Mountains, Tunnel Rat redeployed to New York City where he battled Alley Vipers in the sewers.

=== IDW Publishing ===
Tunnel Rat appears in issue #4 of the IDW Publishing G.I. Joe series. He assists his teammates when The Pit comes under siege by robotic adversaries.

== Toys ==
=== A Real American Hero ===
The first Tunnel Rat figure was released as part of the 1987 series of G.I. Joe: A Real American Hero. A second version was made available a year later as part of the Night Force sub-set, packaged with Psyche-Out. A third Tunnel Rat figure was part of the Sonic Fighters sub-set in 1990, and came with an oversized backpack that featured electronic sounds.

=== G.I. Joe vs. Cobra/Valor vs. Venom ===
The original Tunnel Rat sculpt was revived as part of a new "Night Force" set released in 2004. That same year, he was released as part of the "Desert Patrol Squad" set, which also included the figures Ambush, Dusty, Gung Ho, Snake Eyes and Stalker. Both sets were only available at Toys "R" Us stores.

Two all-new sculpted Tunnel Rat figures were released as well. The first (G.I. Joe vs. Cobra) portrayed him as being much taller than previously seen in other media. This was corrected in the second version (Valor vs. Venom).

=== Comic Book Pack ===
Tunnel Rat figure using the original mold, but with a newly sculpted head to reflect his comic book appearances, was packaged along with Flint, General Abernathy, and a reprint of Marvel Comics G.I. Joe #76.

=== Rise of Cobra ===
While he did not appear in the movie, a figure for Tunnel Rat was created for the toyline. Tunnel Rat is part of a 2-figure Walmart exclusive, packaged with Monkeywrench, an explosives expert for the Dreadnoks.

=== Classified Series ===
In 2023 a 6" figure was released of Tunnel Rat.

== Animated series ==
=== G.I. Joe: The Movie ===
In the animated series, the character first appeared in the 1987 animated film G.I. Joe: The Movie as a member of the Rawhides, a group of G.I. Joe rookies. He was voiced by Laurie Faso. Tunnel Rat was depicted as a rather cocky and wisecracking but good-natured individual with a thick Brooklyn accent. He was often partnered with the taller Big Lob. In their training exercise, Big Lob and Tunnel Rat have to complete an obstacle course. Tunnel Rat is berated for his cavalier, macho attitude in the face of a dangerous training course by Beach Head. During the challenge, he avoids the obstacles by crawling through a pipeline that leads him to the end of the obstacle course. The Rawhides would try to operate on their own throughout the movie and are some of the last Joes available for the final assault on Cobra-La. Tunnel Rat plays a role in G.I. Joe's victory by finding a secret tunnel entrance to Cobra-La, allowing the remaining Joes to stage their attack and free the captured Joes. At one point in battle, Tunnel Rat falls into the mouth of a giant slug-like creature, and blasts his way out.

=== Spy Troops ===
Tunnel Rat appeared in the direct-to-video CGI animated movie G.I. Joe: Spy Troops, voiced by Doron Bell Jr.

=== Sigma Six ===
Tunnel Rat also appears in G.I. Joe: Sigma 6, although his character design is completely overhauled, leaving no resemblance to his previous version. In Sigma Six, he has a penchant for portable hi-tech devices and a specialty in infiltration and demolition materials. He is also somewhat lazy and will eat anything, including live insects. He often works with Heavy Duty, who appears to be his best friend.

=== Resolute ===
The character appears in G.I. Joe: Resolute, voiced by Eric Bauza. He is given the task of destroying a Cobra satellite network. Though loose debris nearly killed him, he was able to pull off the mission and landed safely back to Earth.

=== Renegades ===
In G.I. Joe: Renegades, Tunnel Rat is portrayed as Chinese American, hailing from Chinatown. He is part of the titular "Renegades", a sub-team of Joes on the run from the law, and one of the central characters of the series. He often acts as the comic relief in contrast to the more serious characters. He serves as the team's medic, having field medic training. He is an outdoor survival expert with extensive knowledge of soil microbes, plants, fungi, and insects.

In the episode "White Out," it was revealed that Tunnel Rat was once on the same military team with Snow Job and Frostbite. In the episode "The Anomaly," it is revealed that Tunnel Rat has a brother named Teddy. The siblings work together in saving a friend who had been abducted by a Sewer Viper. At the end of the episode, Tunnel Rat goes to see his family. The reunion takes place off-screen, as the viewers only hear Tunnel Rat's mom yell "Nicky!?" in a surprised tone.

== Books ==
- Tunnel Rat is a featured character in the G.I. Joe novel Fool's Gold.
- He is briefly mentioned in the e-book Diary Of An American Boy.

== Video games ==
Tunnel Rat appears as a non-playable supporting character in the video game G.I. Joe: The Rise of Cobra voiced by Bumper Robinson.
