= G.I. Joe: The Movie =

1987 animated film by Don Jurwich

- North American poster
- Directed by: Don Jurwich
- Written by: Buzz Dixon (uncredited); Ron Friedman
- Based on: G.I. Joe by Hasbro Lost Horizon by James Hilton
- Produced by: Joe Bacal; Tom Griffin
- Starring: Don Johnson; Burgess Meredith; Sgt. Slaughter; Kene Holliday
- Cinematography: Masatoshi Fukui
- Edited by: David Hankins
- Music by: Robert J. Walsh; Jon Douglas
- Production companies: Hasbro; Sunbow Productions; Marvel Productions; Toei Animation Co., Ltd.
- Distributed by: Celebrity Home Entertainment
- Release date: August 25, 1987 (home video)
- Running time: 93 minutes
- Country: United States
- Language: English

G.I. Joe: The Movie (also known as Action Force: The Movie in the UK) is a 1987 American direct-to-video animated military science fiction action film produced as a sequel to the 1983 animated series G.I. Joe: A Real American Hero, based on the original Hasbro toyline. It was produced by Sunbow Productions and Marvel Productions and was animated in Japan by Toei Animation Co., Ltd.

== Plot ==
External videos
- G.I. Joe: The Movie (1987) - Full Movie via the Hasbro Pulse YouTube channel

While Cobra Commander and Serpentor blame each other as the root cause of Cobra's failures, Pythona, a woman from the secret civilization Cobra-La, fights her way into the Terror Drome and into Serpentor's chambers, where he recognizes her from a suppressed memory. She has him lead Cobra forces in an attempt to steal the Broadcast Energy Transmitter (BET), an experimental energy generator being tested in the Himalayas by G.I. Joe. Despite a massive attack, Cobra is driven off, and Serpentor is captured. A small contingent of Joes, led by Roadblock, follows the retreating Cobra forces deep into the Himalayan Mountains, where mysterious creatures with apparent ties to Cobra Commander brutally attack and capture them.

Back at G.I. Joe Headquarters, a new group of rookie Joes join the team. They endure rigorous training under Beach Head's critical eye. Lt. Falcon is conspicuously absent from training, giving an unauthorized tour of Serpentor's holding facility to an unassuming young woman named Heather (Dreadnok Zarana in disguise). Duke discovers Falcon's dereliction of duty and punishes him by placing him on guard duty.

Back in the Himalayas, most Cobras are held as the "guests" of Cobra-La. Golobulus, the supreme ruler, explains his race's history: Cobra-La was a prehistoric civilization that ruled Earth. Their society, however, was erased by the onset of an ice age, forcing the few survivors to hide in caves deep within the Himalayas. It is also revealed that Cobra Commander is a Cobra-La citizen sent out to conquer Earth for them. However, Cobra Commander's repeated failures caused Golobulus to inspire Doctor Mindbender to create Serpentor through dream manipulation.

Using information gleaned from her encounter with Falcon, Zarana leads the Dreadnoks, Pythona, and the hulking Nemesis Enforcer to Serpentor's detention facility. Falcon, who is supposed to be monitoring the doors, instead harasses fellow rookie Jinx in the motor pool. Serpentor is freed, and the Cobras escape. Falcon is arrested for abandoning his post.

In Cobra-La, Cobra Commander is tried, and Golobulus reveals his plans to launch spore pods filled with mutative spores into space and use the BET to hatch them, thus dooming humanity. He punishes Cobra Commander for his repeated failures following his trial by exposing him to the spores, which slowly begin transforming Cobra Commander into a snake. He flees and makes his way to the Joes' camp with Roadblock.

At Joe Headquarters, Duke pleads Falcon's case, revealing he is Falcon's half-brother. Rather than be court-martialed, Falcon is punished with an aggressive 'retraining' program at the hands of Sgt. Slaughter and his "Renegades": Mercer, Red Dog, and Taurus. On a weaponless recon mission in the Terror Drome, the five learn that Cobra is planning a second attempt to obtain the BET. As Falcon and the others destroy the Terror Drome, Cobra launches an assault on the Joes and successfully steals the BET. Serpentor attempts to kill Falcon, but Duke intervenes and falls into a coma.

Falcon, the Renegades, and the recruits head to the Himalayas to stop Cobra-La. Cobra Commander leads the G.I. Joe team to Cobra-La's lair. Eventually, he loses his sentience and slithers away, now completely a snake. The recruits prove themselves valuable soldiers as the Joes rescue their captured teammates. Falcon, Jinx, and Sgt. Slaughter confronts Golobulus, Pythona, and Serpentor. The ensuing fight culminates in Jinx and Slaughter sending Pythona and Nemesis Enforcer to their apparent demise. Finally, Falcon sends Serpentor out of Cobra-La and reconfigures the BET to incinerate the spore pods in space and destroy Cobra-La as Golobulus escapes. Immediately after the battle, the strike team receives news that Duke has woken from his coma and is recovering.

== Voice cast ==
- Charlie Adler as Low-Light
- Shuko Akune as Jinx
- Jack Angel as Wet Suit
- Jackson Beck as Narrator
- Michael Bell as Duke, Xamot, Blowtorch and Lift-Ticket
- Greg Berger as Motor-Viper
- Earl Boen as Taurus
- Arthur Burghardt as Destro and Iceberg
- Corey Burton as Tomax
- William Callaway as Beach Head
- François Chau as Quick Kick
- Peter Cullen as Zandar and Nemesis Enforcer
- Brian Cummings as Doctor Mindbender
- Jennifer Darling as Pythona
- Laurie Faso as Tunnel Rat
- Hank Garrett as Dial Tone
- Dick Gautier as Serpentor
- Ed Gilbert as General Hawk
- Dan Gilvezan as Slip Stream
- Zack Hoffman as Zartan
- Kene Holliday as Roadblock
- John Hostetter as Bazooka
- Don Johnson as Lt. Falcon
- Buster Jones as Doc
- Chris Latta as Cobra Commander, Gung Ho and Ripper
- Morgan Lofting as Baroness
- Chuck McCann as Leatherneck
- Michael McConnohie as Cross Country
- Mary Lewis as Lady Jaye
- Burgess Meredith as Golobulus
- Ron Ortiz as Law
- Rob Paulsen as Snow Job
- Pat Pinney as Mainframe
- Poncie Ponce as Red Dog
- Lisa Raggio as Zarana/Heather
- Bill Ratner as Flint
- Neil Ross as Buzzer, Dusty, Monkeywrench and Shipwreck
- Brad Sanders as Big Lob
- Ted Schwartz as Thrasher
- Sgt. Slaughter as Sgt. Slaughter
- Christopher Tabori as Mercer
- B.J. Ward as Scarlett
- Vernee Watson Johnson as Scientist
- Lee Weaver as Alpine
- Frank Welker as Torch, Wild Bill and Order
- Stan Wojno Jr. as Lifeline

== Production ==
The writers did not originally intend for "Cobra-La" to be the name of the rival civilization. "Cobra-La" was merely a placeholder name in the script's drafts (borrowed from the 1933 novel Lost Horizon by James Hilton which featured the fabled city Shangri-La), which the writers intended to change. However, Hasbro executives fell in love with the Cobra-La name and forced the writers to keep it.

In the film's original script, Duke dies in battle after receiving a wound from a snake spear hurled by Serpentor. After this event was written into the script, it inspired the death of the Autobot leader Optimus Prime in The Transformers: The Movie while both films were in production. However, Optimus Prime's death sparked a severe backlash among both fans and parents, and Hasbro reversed their decision on allowing Duke's death. While the scene was kept, replacement dialogue was inserted stating that Duke had gone into a coma. In the film's ending, it is stated that he had come out of the coma. Writer and story editor Buzz Dixon said in an interview with JoeHeadquarters.com, "[If] you watch the visuals and don't listen to the soundtrack, it's obvious Duke dies." In the original script, the Joes also held his funeral prior to the final battle.

== Release ==
Created at the height of the G.I. Joe craze in the 1980s, G.I. Joe: The Movie was intended as the third theatrical release of a Hasbro-produced film after My Little Pony: The Movie and The Transformers: The Movie. Following unexpected production delays and the poor box office performances of its predecessors, it premiered direct-to-video instead on August 25, 1987. It premiered on television in syndication—as early as September 4, 1987—first in feature-length format and later split into a five-part miniseries format as part of the series' syndication package. The film was followed by the 1989 animated series G.I. Joe: A Real American Hero, which takes place after the events of the movie.

Rhino Entertainment first released the film on DVD on June 20, 2000, with 5.1 remastered and remixed “Rhinophonic” sound and contains some extra features. Shout! Factory released a remastered special edition on DVD and Blu-ray on July 27, 2010, featuring audio commentary from story consultant (and series writer) Buzz Dixon, and a printable copy of the original screenplay.

In 2022, it was announced that Fathom Events would finally bring the movie to theaters for a special two-day event to commemorate its 35th anniversary. The screenings also contained exclusive behind-the-scenes and interactive content.
