= Grunt (G.I. Joe) =

- G.I. Joe character
- First appearance: G.I. Joe: A Real American Hero issue #1 (June 1982)
- Voiced by: Dan Roth (Sunbow/Marvel); Robert O. Smith (DiC)

In-universe information
- Affiliation: G.I. Joe
- Specialty: Infantry Trooper
- File name: Graves, Robert W.
- Birth place: Columbus, OH
- SN: RA52779623
- Rank: E-4 (Corporal) (1982); E-5 (Sergeant) (1991); E-6 (Staff Sergeant) (1997)
- Primary MOS: Infantry
- Secondary MOS: Small Arms Armorer, Artillery Coordinator

Grunt is a fictional character from the G.I. Joe: A Real American Hero toyline, comic books and animated series. He is an infantryman with the G.I. Joe Team and debuted in 1982.

== Profile ==
His real name is Robert W. Graves, and his rank is that of corporal E-4. Grunt was born in Columbus, Ohio.

He graduated from Advanced Infantry Training in the top ten of his class. Grunt's primary military specialty is infantry and his secondary military specialties are as a small-arms armorer as well as being an artillery coordinator. He is familiar with all NATO and Warsaw Pact small arms, as well as domestic civilian arms, and is a qualified expert with the M-14, M-16, and the M-1911A1 auto pistol.

Grunt eventually left the G.I. Joe Team to get his engineering degree at the Georgia Institute of Technology. There, he met a girl named Lola, whom he later married and the two have a young daughter together. The file card that came with the 1991 figure followed this story line, but differed in continuity by having him come back to the team.

== Toys ==
Grunt was first released as an action figure as part of the original 1982 line. His action figure featured him in a green combat body suit. All of the original sixteen figures from 1982 were released with "straight arms". The same figure was re-released in 1983 with "swivel-arm battle grip", which made it easier for figures to hold their rifles and accessories. and was also released under Action Force in the UK in 1985 as a mailaway army builder. The swivel-arm version of the figure was also re-colored tan, and released in 1983 packaged with the "Falcon" attack glider. In 1986, the original swivel-arm version of the figure was included in the "Original Team" mail-away set. A new version of Grunt was released in 1991, with an all-new mold and head sculpt.

== Comics ==
=== Marvel Comics ===
Grunt first appeared in G.I. Joe: A Real American Hero #1 (June 1982) by Marvel Comics. For 100 issues, he appears on the front cover, in a logo-section in the upper left corner.

As with most of the other original Joes, his body suit is a full green rather than the gray of the toy. He was featured regularly in the early issues of the series. One of his first missions was working with General Hawk and Snake Eyes to bring down a murderous militia commander named Wingfield. At the conclusion of this mission, he works with Zap to disable Wingfield's nuclear bomb.

Later, he is part of a Joe team keeping Cobra Commander prisoner in the Rockies. A flashback in a later issue reveals Grunt was a soldier on the mission that led to Snake Eyes' unintentional scarring.

==== College days ====
As more new characters were introduced, Grunt was shunted into the background. In issue #55, Grunt leaves the Joe Team to go to Georgia Tech. He encourages Clutch, who had come to see him off, to keep in touch via his mother's address. He later meets and befriends a female ex-soldier, Lola. When Stalker’s team was captured in Borovia by the local militia, Grunt contacts Breaker and gets the number for the current Joe headquarters. He talks to Roadblock and offers to go on the rescue operation, reasoning that being out of service will help with 'plausible deniability'. Roadblock tells Grunt there will be no rescue operation, 'official, covert or otherwise'. An 'otherwise' op later rescues the imprisoned officers.

When most of the Joe Team is suspended and imprisoned after the disastrous events of the Cobra Civil War, Grunt and his girlfriend, Lola, follow Roadblock's call to help save their friends. They join with several Joe members who had escaped the government and gone underground. They meet at the house of Adele Burkhardt, the peace activist Grunt helped to rescue in issue #1. General Hawk and Joe supporter General Hollingsworth are being held in a hospital filled with a murderous American military faction. Unexpected interference by Destro helps save the generals and clear the Joe team of all charges.

Grunt appears in issue #145 and explains that he has gained an engineering degree. His former teammates expresses their wish that he come back to join them. Duke encourages him to stick with his current life, as society needs more people building things instead of destroying them.

The comics never had Grunt rejoin the Joe Team, going in a different direction from the toy’s storyline.

=== Devil’s Due comics ===
With the renewed threat of Cobra, former Joe team members are called back into action. The rank-filling Greenshirts, with a uniform very similar to the one Grunt wore.

Grunt was not among the first to heed the call to duty. Readers would not know the Devil’s Due comics had followed the toy’s storyline of Grunt returning to the Joe Team until issue #24 where he is listed as among the Joes tasked with invading Cobra Island. His last appearance, thus far, is in issue #36 where the original Joe Team is assembled before being disbanded once more.

He is not seen in the G.I. Joe: America’s Elite series as he is not one of the active members. He is a member of the reserves as indicated in the Data Desk Handbook special.

Grunt is featured in the series G.I. Joe Declassified, which focuses on early missions of the Joe team. He and several other Joes get into trouble far behind enemy lines.

Grunt has since appeared in his own issue explaining why he joined the army, and later the G.I. Joe team. It covers events both passed and present including his marriage and his return. Throughout the issue, the story of another young man who joins Cobra is told which shows how much character Grunt truly has. While Grunt serves for patriotism the other man only wants wealth and personal glory.

=== Dreamwave ===
Grunt is one of the background soldiers in the 2003 limited series 'G.I. Joe Vs. Transformers'. In this alternate history, the conflict is played out during World War II.

== Animated series ==
=== Sunbow ===
Grunt appeared in the original G.I. Joe animated series. Grunt is first seen in the A Real American Hero mini-series of the Sunbow-produced G.I. Joe animated series. However, much of the series’ focus was on the newer characters and Grunt was quickly shunted to the background. His final appearance in that series was in two-part episode Worlds Without End where the Joe Team find themselves in an alternate universe where Cobra is victorious in ruling the world. After finding out the fate of that universe’s Grunt, the series’ Grunt, along with Steeler and Clutch, elected to stay behind and win the world back from Cobra.

=== DiC ===
In the second season of the DiC-produced animated series, Grunt is seen again in the episode "Keyboard Warriors", voiced by Robert O. Smith. While the second series purports itself as a continuation of the first animated series, no explanation is made how Grunt returned from the alternate universe or whether this is supposed to be the same character.

== Live action film ==
Grunt appears in the film G.I. Joe: Retaliation, portrayed by Ryan Hansen, but he only has one line of dialogue, and he is among all but three Joes killed when the President (Zartan) orders an airstrike on the Joe's staging base in the Indus Valley.

== Other works ==
Grunt has a brief mention in the non-fiction novel 'Paradise Of Bombs'. His character is the basis for another's code-name in the novel 'Hacking Harvard'.
