= Doc (G.I. Joe) =

Character from the G.I. Joe franchise

Doc (also known as G.I. Joe Doc) is the code name of two fictional characters from the G.I. Joe: A Real American Hero toyline, comic book and animated series by Sunbow/Marvel.

The first is Carl W. Greer, who is the G.I. Joe Team's original medic and debuted in 1983. The second fictional character to use the code name was Carla P. Greer, the niece of the original Doc who has the same rank and skills.

== Carl W. Greer ==
Doc
- G.I. Joe character
- First appearance: G.I. Joe #11 (May 1983)
- Voiced by: Buster Jones (Sunbow/Marvel); Steve Blum (Resolute); Phil LaMarr (Renegades)

In-universe information
- Affiliation: G.I. Joe
- Specialty: Medic
- File name: Greer, Carl W.
- Birth place: Concord, Massachusetts
- SN: RA367221097
- Rank: O-3 (Captain)
- Primary MOS: Medical Doctor
- Secondary MOS: Chaplain's Assistant

=== Profile ===
His real name was Carl W. Greer and he was ranked as an O-3 Captain. He was born in Concord, Massachusetts. His primary military specialty was medical doctor and his secondary military specialty was chaplain's assistant.

Doc was the first member of the G.I. Joe medical team, and possibly the only one with a terminal degree; his M.D. Doc is a graduate of Harvard Medical School, and completed his residency at Johns Hopkins to become a full medical doctor. He also completed training at the Airborne School, Mountaineering School and the Desert Training Unit. He is an avowed pacifist for practical reasons, in accordance with the Geneva Convention guidelines for battlefield medics. A spiritual man, he devoted himself to alleviating suffering in the world, and admired the G.I. Joe Team's efforts to do the same, by challenging those who would bring about violence and chaos.

=== Toys ===
Doc was first released as an action figure in 1983. The figure came with an accessory described as a flare - launcher. The same figure was included in the "Original Team" mail-away set in 1986. The original Doc figure was modeled after Hasbro designer Khipra Nichols.

A new version of Doc was released in 2008 as a mail-in exclusive, as part of "Operation: Rescue Doc".

=== Comics ===
==== G.I. Joe: A Real American Hero ====
In the Marvel Comics G.I. Joe series, he first appeared in G.I. Joe: A Real American Hero #11 (May 1983). He saves three other Joes from Destro with a well-aimed snowball, saying he was unable to carry a weapon due to the Geneva Convention. He loses to the man in a fistfight, but manages to secure the antidote needed for several ill Joes. Furthermore, he faces down an armed squad of Cobra soldiers, tricking them into believing they were also sick and trading the 'antidote' for the plutonium that Cobra had taken. What the Cobra personnel inject into themselves is really a tetanus booster shot.

Later, Cobra forces make an attack on Joe headquarters. In the confusion, Doc finds General Flagg dead in the brig; Major Bludd had killed him while escaping. Doc then participates in a raid on a Cobra weapons facility located in Asbury Park, New Jersey. He also flies a recon mission with Wild Bill in the Florida Everglades.

Doc is part of a team investigating Cobra activity in the Gulf of Mexico. During a battle, Doc manually aims a ship's gun while Tripwire fixes and fires it. In issue #40, Doc convinces the military authorities to avoid using nuclear weaponry on another Cobra operation in the Gulf of Mexico. Doc persuades them to use enough conventional bombs to simulate a nuclear explosion without the dangerous radiation. This was planned for by Cobra, who uses the after-effects to raise what would later be Cobra Island. Doc is then part of an aborted raid on the newly formed island.

Later, Doc would join in the hunt for and be impersonated by Zartan, an illusion caster who had ended up deep inside the HQ. He is seen in issue #77, helping to take care of the wounded that resulted from the Cobra civil war.

Doc himself would die in issue #109. He is captured by the Crimson Twins, along with several other Joes, after a mission in Trucial Abysmia. When the Crimson Twins botch an instruction from Cobra Commander and order the prisoners' execution, a S.A.W. Viper steps up to the task. Doc is the first to be slain, followed by several others. The survivors wound the Viper and escape.

=== Animated series ===
==== Sunbow ====
He first appeared in the "A Real American Hero" mini-series, voiced by Buster Jones.

==== G.I. Joe: The Movie ====
Doc also appeared briefly in the 1987 animated film G.I. Joe: The Movie, in which he treats a severely injured Duke. Near the end of the movie, his voice can be heard informing the Joe team that Duke had come out of his coma.

==== Resolute ====
Doc appears in G.I. Joe: Resolute as the medical officer on the USS Flagg. During the autopsy of Bazooka, Doc discovers a message for Snake Eyes hidden inside Bazooka's mouth.

==== Renegades ====
Doc appears in the G.I. Joe: Renegades episode "Rage" voiced by Phil LaMarr. He is shown as a civilian doctor who is watching over the war veterans who fell victim to the experiments conducted by Destro and Scrap-Iron. Doc later helps G.I. Joe get away when Flint arrives.

== Carla P. Greer ==
G.I. Joe Doc
- G.I. Joe character
- First appearance: 2004 (comic); 2007 (figure)

In-universe information
- Affiliation: G.I. Joe
- Specialty: Medical Doctor
- File name: Greer, Carla P.
- Birth place: Concord, MA
- Rank: O-3
- Primary MOS: Medical Corps Officer
- Secondary MOS: Chaplain's Assistant (56M)

=== Fictional character biography ===
Carla P. Greer is the niece of the original Doc. She acquired her medical degree from Wayne State University, and took residence at a hospital in Detroit. After enlistment, she graduated top of her class from the Army Medical Department Officer Advanced Course, leading her to join G.I. Joe. Like her uncle, she is a pacifist, but carries a special tranquilizer gun used to help sedate patients or incapacitate enemies.

=== A Real American Hero Toy history ===
In the 3 3/4 inch toy line, Carla has had 1 figure made. She first appeared in 2007 as part of the "Tanks for the Memories" convention exclusive pack. The mold for her body is actually the same mold used to create the 1985 Lady Jaye figure.

=== America’s Elite - Devils Due ===
Carla Greer is listed in #28 as being deployed to Walter Reed Medical Center. Carla makes a one panel appearance in the final issue of America's Elite. She is part of the medical team tending to wounded after the events of World War III.

=== Alternate Realities/Continuities ===
A female Doc, based on the original male character, made her first appearance once before she existed in the main continuity.

==== G.I. Joe: Reloaded ====
A Carla W. Greer first appeared in the 2004 issue of G.I. Joe: Reborn, the second one-shot that set up the 14 issue comic book series G.I. Joe: Reloaded published by Devil's Due. This series was a new take on the formation of the G.I. Joe team. Carla was one of the characters with the most change to their history.

In this reality, Carla is the first person to use the code-name Doc. It is never revealed if she has an uncle named Carl that served as a Medical doctor as an inspiration to her. She is first seen in the US Army Medical Research Institute of Infectious Diseases treating Scarlett. She is recruited to the Joe team after helping the Joes confront a seeming terrorist attack.

==== G.I.Joe 2016 ====
In the first issue of this alternate universe series, Carla is seen working with her uncle on a device to detect shapeshifting aliens called Dire Wraiths.

== Live-action film ==
Doc will be appearing in G.I. Joe: Ever Vigilant.
