= Gung-Ho (G.I. Joe) =

Character from the G.I. Joe franchise

- G.I. Joe character
- First appearance: G.I. Joe #11 (May 1983)
- Voiced by: Chris Latta (Sunbow/Marvel); Scott McNeil (Valor vs. Venom); Charlie Adler (Resolute); Steve Blum (The Rise of Cobra); Curt Bonnem (G.I. Joe: Operation Blackout)

In-universe information
- Affiliation: G.I. Joe
- Specialty: Marine, SgtMaj
- File name: LaFitte, Ettienne R.
- Birth place: Fer-de-Lance, LA
- SN: MC56488390
- Rank: E-7 (Gunnery Sergeant) (1983); E-9 (Sergeant Major) (1992)
- Primary MOS: Recondo
- Secondary MOS: Jungle Warfare Training Instructor
- Subgroups: Mega Marines; Desert Patrol Squad

Gung-Ho is a fictional character from the G.I. Joe: A Real American Hero toyline, comic books, and animated series. He is the G.I. Joe Team's original Marine and debuted in 1983.

== Profile ==
Gung-Ho's real name is Ettienne R. LaFitte, and his rank was originally that of a gunnery sergeant E-7. He was later promoted to sergeant major E-9 (USMC). Gung-Ho was born as part of a large Cajun clan, in the fictional Fer-de-Lance, Louisiana. His primary military specialty is recondo instructor and his secondary military specialty is jungle warfare training instructor.

He eventually relocated to New Orleans, earning a reputation as a bare-knuckle brawler and knife fighter. He joined the United States Marine Corps when he turned 18, and was the distinguished honor graduate from Marine Corps Recruit Depot Parris Island. Gung-Ho has attended Airborne School, Recondo School, Marine Ordnance School, Administration School at Camp Johnson, and is a qualified expert in all NATO infantry small arms, most Warsaw Pact infantry weapons and the XM-76 grenade launcher.

Gung-Ho is known for his lack of fear on the battlefield, as well as his legendary feats of near-superhuman strength. His teammates have come to rely on his selfless bravery, strength and perseverance. After the team was temporarily disbanded and reinstated, Gung-Ho was offered a position as a field commander. His expertise in the swamps of Louisiana helped him lead a mission to invade and shut down the Dreadnok compound in the Florida Everglades.

== Toys ==
Gung-Ho was first released as an action figure in 1983. He was also released as an action figure in his dress blues uniform in 1987.

A new version of Gung-Ho was released in 1992. That figure was repainted and released as part of the "Battle Corps" line in 1993.

A new version of Gung-Ho was released as an action figure in 1993, as commander of the "Mega Marines" subset. The Mega-Marines are several Joes teaming up to battle Cobra-allied monsters. His figure came with "moldable bio-armor".

A version of Gung-Ho with no accessories came with the Built to Rule Rock Crusher, which followed the G.I. Joe: Spy Troops story line. The forearms and the calves of the figure sported places where blocks could be attached.

In 2004, he was released as part of the Toys R Us exclusive "Desert Patrol Squad" set, which also included the figures Ambush, Dusty, Snake Eyes, Stalker and Tunnel Rat.

=== 25th anniversary ===
- Gung-Ho has been released in the first G.I. Joe set alongside Duke, Scarlett, Snake Eyes, and Roadblock.
- He has been released in wave 5.
- Comic Pack Gung-Ho & Cobra Commander (who is actually Fred VII) also has been released.

== Comics ==
=== Marvel Comics ===
In the Marvel Comics G.I. Joe series, he first appeared in G.I. Joe: A Real American Hero #11 (May 1983) where it was revealed that he has a kid sister who is a successful child model. In the same issue, he helps defeat Cobra forces who were spreading a plague and stealing valuable radioactive materials.

He is one of many Joes sent to Sierra Gordo in an attempt to clear up multiple hotspots. The Baroness almost kills his entire group with a bombing run from a Rattler but they escape unharmed. The Baroness also bombs a nearby island, making the Joes think they just witnessed the death of Snake Eyes.

He was one of the Joes picked to guard Cobra Commander. The ninja Storm Shadow eventually frees the Commander who escapes to safety. Storm Shadow and Gung-Ho injure each other during the incident. Storm Shadow is defeated and captured by Roadblock.

An attempt at relaxation leads Gung-Ho and Blowtorch to confront Crimson Guardsmen at a local fair.

During Cobra's first civil war (both take place on Cobra Island) Gung-Ho is part of an advanced recon team. They go through multiple incidents of trouble such as almost being caught by Iron Grenadiers and taking over Cobra's air traffic control tower. The latter allows a Joe landing force to arrive.

=== Action Force ===
In the Action Force comic line, Gung-Ho is badly wounded by Storm Shadow during a confrontation in a Cobra base. He lives, but must receive long-term medical attention.

=== Devil's Due ===
He is featured in the first four issues of the Devil's Due series G.I. Joe: Frontlines, which chronicles the last mission of the original run of the G.I. Joe team. Along with others, he battles various Cobra forces in order to keep valuable technology out of their hands. This takes the Joes all the way to Destro's 'Silent Castle' in Trans-Carpathia.

He is one of the few initially brought back when the G.I. Joe team is reinstated in 2001. The old Joes meet the new group of trainees, the "Greenshirts", whom they will be commanding. Gung-Ho then joins in on the attack on the multi-Cobra force stationed in the Dreadnoks complex in the Florida Everglades. Gung-Ho and the other Joes become contaminated by multi-function nanites set off by Major Bludd. Thanks to the efforts of Lifeline, Mainframe, and recruited civilians, they are soon cured.

== Animated series ==
=== Sunbow ===
Gung-Ho appeared in the original G.I. Joe animated series. He first appeared in the animated series in the "A Real American Hero" mini-series. He was voiced by Chris Latta in a southern accent, despite the fact that he is of French Cajun ancestry.

In the first-season episode "Countdown for Zartan", Gung-Ho imprisons Zartan within a defense center, where Zartan has planted a time bomb. Gung-Ho secretly sets Zartan's watch two minutes early and lets him watch the time run out, pressuring Zartan into giving the location of the bomb.

In the two-part episode "Captives of Cobra", the Baroness attempts to kidnap and brainwash Gung-Ho's family, but her troops are defeated and captured by his relatives and she herself flees after they attempt to show her hospitality. Gung-Ho is then scolded by his grandmother about his not visiting home enough.

One episode had the Joes working together along with their Soviet counterparts, the Oktober Guard. Gung-Ho comes into conflict with Guard member Horrorshow, with whom he trades insults, but they put aside their differences and work together against Cobra. The two would later join forces once more to prevent Cobra from stealing Alaska from the United States.

=== G.I. Joe: The Movie ===
Gung-Ho plays a minor but critical role in G.I. Joe: The Movie. He, Alpine and Bazooka are charged with guarding the captured Serpentor. Lt. Falcon is supposed to be guarding the front, but leaves his post. As a result, all three Joes are attacked by the Dreadnoks and Nemesis Enforcer. Gung-Ho sounds the alarm before Serpentor escapes.

=== Valor vs. Venom ===
Gung-Ho appeared in the direct-to-video CGI animated movie G.I. Joe: Valor vs. Venom, voiced by Scott McNeil.

=== Resolute ===
Gung-Ho appears in G.I. Joe: Resolute as one of the many Joes seen on the U.S.S. Flagg. He, Roadblock, Stalker, and Beachhead head to a H.A.A.R.P. Facility where the Baroness and Destro are holding H.A.A.R.P. Scientist hostage. While Stalker and Beachhead went to go free the scientist, Gung-Ho and Roadblock engage the Cobra troops then engaged Destro and Baroness in a gun fight and were able to capture them.

== Video games ==
Gung-Ho is one of the featured characters in the 1985 G.I. Joe: A Real American Hero computer game. He is a non-playable supporting character in the 1992 game G.I. Joe: The Atlantis Factor.

Gung-Ho appears as a playable character in the video game G.I. Joe: The Rise of Cobra, voiced by Steve Blum.

== Books ==
Gung-Ho is a featured character in the 'Find Your Fate' novel 'G.I. Joe and the Everglades Swamp Terror' produced by Ballantine Books.

== Other media ==
- Gung-Ho appeared in the Robot Chicken episode "Day at the Circus", voiced by Seth Green. He left with Flint and Roadblock on a mission only to partake in a prank upon Snow Job.
- Gung-Ho is featured in the Weezer music video for their song Pork and Beans (2008).
