= Lady Jaye =

Fictional character from the G.I. Joe franchise

- G.I. Joe character
- First appearance: 1984
- Portrayed by: Adrianne Palicki
- Voiced by: Mary McDonald-Lewis (Sunbow); Lisa Corps (DiC, Operation Dragonfire); Suzanne Errett-Balcom (DiC, Season 1); Nika Futterman (Renegades); Fryda Wolff (G.I. Joe: Operation Blackout)

In-universe information
- Affiliation: G.I. Joe
- Specialty: Covert Operations
- File name: Hart-Burnett, Alison R. Burnett, Jaye (2013 film)
- Birth place: Martha's Vineyard, MA; Cork, Ireland (Action Force)
- SN: 853-71-HB49
- Rank: E-4 (Corporal) (1985); E-7 (Sergeant First Class) (1997); E-6 (Staff Sergeant) (2003); E-5 (Sergeant) (Renegades); O-2 (First Lieutenant), later promoted to O-3 (Captain) (2013)
- Primary MOS: Counterintelligence
- Secondary MOS: Personnel Clerk, Armament Repair

Lady Jaye is a fictional character in the G.I. Joe: A Real American Hero toyline, comic books and animated series. She was originally created as a character for the G.I. Joe animated series produced by Marvel Productions and Sunbow Productions in 1984, was later produced as an action figure, and was finally introduced into the comic book in 1985. Lady Jaye is the G.I. Joe Team's covert operations specialist. She is portrayed by Adrianne Palicki in the 2013 film G.I. Joe: Retaliation.

== Profile ==
Her real name is Alison R. Hart-Burnett, and her rank is that of Staff Sergeant E-6.

Lady Jaye was born on Martha's Vineyard, Massachusetts. She is a Bryn Mawr graduate, and also did graduate work in Trinity College in Dublin before graduating from intelligence school at Fort Holabird.

She is Airborne and Ranger qualified, and an expert with the M-16, M-1911A1 auto pistol and reflex crossbow. She is also an accomplished actress and fluent in several languages. She has a knack for impersonation, right down to the subject's voice and mannerisms.

In the Sunbow animated series and in the Marvel Comics series, she has a romance with Flint, the rugged warrant officer. Both first appeared in the Revenge of Cobra miniseries.

In the UK Action Force series, Lady Jaye is from Cork in Ireland.

== Toys ==
Lady Jaye was first released as an action figure in 1985. She is the only figure to have a shoulder patch on her uniform. The patch on the left sleeve of her uniform is the U.S. Army Reserve's 91st Army Reserve Command patch, which today is the 91st Training Division.

== Comics ==
=== Marvel ===
Lady Jaye's first comics appearance was in the Marvel Comics series G.I. Joe: A Real American Hero #32 (February 1985), where her codename was spelled "Lady J". She arrives with Ripcord; the two are meant as replacements for Grunt and Scarlett.

She goes up on a training flight with Ace as his co-pilot. The duo get into a conflict with the Cobra pilot Wild Weasel and his co-pilot, the Baroness. After emptying their weapons at each other, the pilots salute each other and fly off. Neither co-pilot understands why.

Lady Jaye leads a training mission in issue #44. She is working with the rookies Crankcase, Heavy Metal, Bazooka and Airtight. All five are captured by Cobra forces as expendable testers of new weapons systems. Despite the Joes having no ammunition on them or in their vehicles, they destroy the opposition and escape.

One of the more prominent moments in Lady Jaye and Flint's relationship happens when he confronts Scarlett and Snake Eyes over the ruses they had used to rescue other Joes. Angered at his insensitivity, Lady Jaye slugs Flint, which soon leads to soothed emotions instead of anger.

Later, during a Cobra-led war in an Eastern European country, the team of Lady Jaye and Flint would hit a snag. In battle with two Cobra soldiers, Flint is forced to kill his opponent but Lady Jaye manages to subdue hers. Faced with the "burden" of a live, healthy prisoner, Flint urges her to kill him and she resists. Flint even offers to do it himself. The soldier is seen later, still a prisoner.

=== Action Force ===
Lady Jaye is a featured character in the slightly altered 'Action Force' continuity, starting with issue one. This version of Lady Jaye has the same file name, and is a native of Cork, Ireland, according to the 1987 Action Force file card of Lady Jaye.

=== Devil's Due ===
After G.I. Joe disbanded, Lady Jaye married Flint. When G.I. Joe was re-formed, many Joes commented that her marriage to Flint seem to have a positive effect on him, given how much more mellow he seemed in his later years than he had during the unit's earlier days. She was killed by Red Shadows member Dela Eden while trying to save Flint in issue #42 (2005). Flint was devastated by her death, yet could not bring himself to kill his wife's murderer. Her death marked a critical turning point in Flint's life.

In the comic G.I. Joe America's Elite, a birthdate of June 10, 1966, for Lady Jaye can be read when Flint visits her grave. Lady Jaye also appeared in the Devil's Due G.I. Joe vs. the Transformers series and the Dreamwave Transformers vs. G.I. Joe series.

=== IDW ===
When Idea and Design Works acquired the G.I. Joe licence from Hasbro in 2009, they began publishing a new monthly series that completely ignored any previous continuity, and Hasbro later officially declared the entire Devil's Due run non-canonical. Lady Jaye's first appearance in this new continuity was in Cobra #6 from October 2011.

Lady Jaye is also once again a main character in IDW's continuation of the original A Real American Hero series, where her and Flint's relationship is continuing as it was in the original Marvel comic. In issue 174 she and Flint lead a team on an operation to kidnap Darklon. As the squad leaves, their helicopter takes fire, with both she and Darklon being seriously wounded. Flint initially orders medical treatment for Lady Jaye, disregarding his orders to bring Darklon back alive at any cost, but Jaye convinces him that the mercenary's intelligence is more important than her life. Roadblock and the other members of the team agree to keep Flint's wavering a secret, and Jaye is rushed into surgery upon their return to The Pit. Though unaware of what Flint nearly did, Hawk tells Flint that he has decided the two of them won't be assigned to the same team again, to avoid any possible complications from their romantic attachment.

== Animated series ==
=== Sunbow ===
In the Sunbow G.I. Joe animated series, Lady Jaye is voiced by Mary McDonald-Lewis. She makes her first appearance in the second G.I. Joe miniseries, "The Revenge of Cobra". She is the second most featured character in the series after Cobra Commander. Lady Jaye was a more mellow and level-headed person compared to her comic book incarnation, but she did occasionally display a potent temper. Her romance with Flint was a common piece of the storyline throughout the show. Lady Jaye's signature weapons were a variety of specialized throwing javelins that featured unique properties, similar to the various crossbow bolts her comrade in arms, Scarlett, uses for her preferred weapon.

Lady Jaye's major roles in the series include investigating gang attacks relating to a mayoral election with Scarlett; being kidnapped along with Flint, Baroness and Cobra Commander by a mentally ill entrepreneur; stopping Cobra from owning a special love perfume and the largest shipping fleet in the world; and disguising herself as the Baroness to learn about Cobra's "Vortex Cone" weapon, which she and Flint then lead a mission to destroy.

Lady Jaye also has a prominent role the first-season episode "An Eye for an Eye", in which she helps a civilian settle a score with Cobra after his home and family were caught in the crossfire of a battle. They end up trapped on an island when Cobra tests their new weapon, the Power Destroyer, on their Skystriker. Lady Jaye is captured and interrogated, but is rescued by the civilian, who then destroys the Power Destroyer through her encouragement.

In "Skeletons in the Closet", it is revealed that she is related to the Joes' enemy, Destro, but the degree of relationship was never specified.

Lady Jaye was featured in one of the series' public service announcements, in which she teaches a child to stop and think before acting.

==== G.I. Joe: The Movie ====
Like most of the characters from the original series, Lady Jaye makes a minor appearance in G.I. Joe: The Movie. She is part of a unit of Joes led by Roadblock who go after the fleeing Cobra forces after Cobra's first attempt to steal the Broadcast Energy Transmitter (B.E.T.) and become captives of Cobra-La.

=== DiC ===
Lady Jaye makes her first appearance as a member of the Sgt. Slaughter's Marauders, wearing a blue version of her original uniform in the five part mini-series, Operation Dragonfire. She still uses her javelins as her primary weapon. As the regular season progressed, Lady Jaye's personality began to change from her original version. She would be used in episodes paired with Captain Grid-Iron instead of Flint, as Flint was not part of the cast for this season. By the time Flint returned to the cast, Lady Jaye had been dropped.

=== Resolute ===
Lady Jaye appears in the 2009 animated webseries, G.I. Joe: Resolute, though she has no speaking lines and is only seen on the USS Flagg aircraft carrier.

=== Renegades ===
Lady Jaye appears in G.I. Joe: Renegades, portrayed as Latin American and voiced by Nika Futterman. In the series, she puts together the Joe team for Scarlett's mission to Cobra Pharmaceuticals. When the Joes become outlaws she is assigned to assist Flint in capturing them. Owing Duke a favor for saving her life, as well as believing they are innocent, Lady Jaye quietly helps whenever possible. Her actions are always carefully hidden to keep Flint from discovering the truth. In an interview with writer Henry Gilroy, Gilroy stated that the relationships between Flint and Lady Jaye as well as Scarlett and Snake Eyes would be evolving as the series progresses.

=== Beyond ===
Lady Jaye is the only female Joe to appear in the direct to video cartoon "Old Soldiers Never Die" which was the only cartoon appearance of Sgt. Savage and his Screaming Eagles (which was also produced by Sunbow Productions, the same company that produced the original Real American Hero cartoon). Lady Jaye, along with Doc and Hawk were part of the team that rescued Sgt. Savage from cryogenic storage. These three Joes (as well as Cobra Commander) appeared in this cartoon as a way of bridging the change from the Real American Hero toyline to the Sgt. Savage line.

In this incarnation, Lady Jaye's hair is blonde and approximately shoulder length. She was voiced by Kathleen Barr.

== Novels ==
Lady Jaye is a supporting character in the Find Your Fate novels Operation: Dragon Fire and The Everglades Swamp Terror by Ballantine Books.

== Live action ==
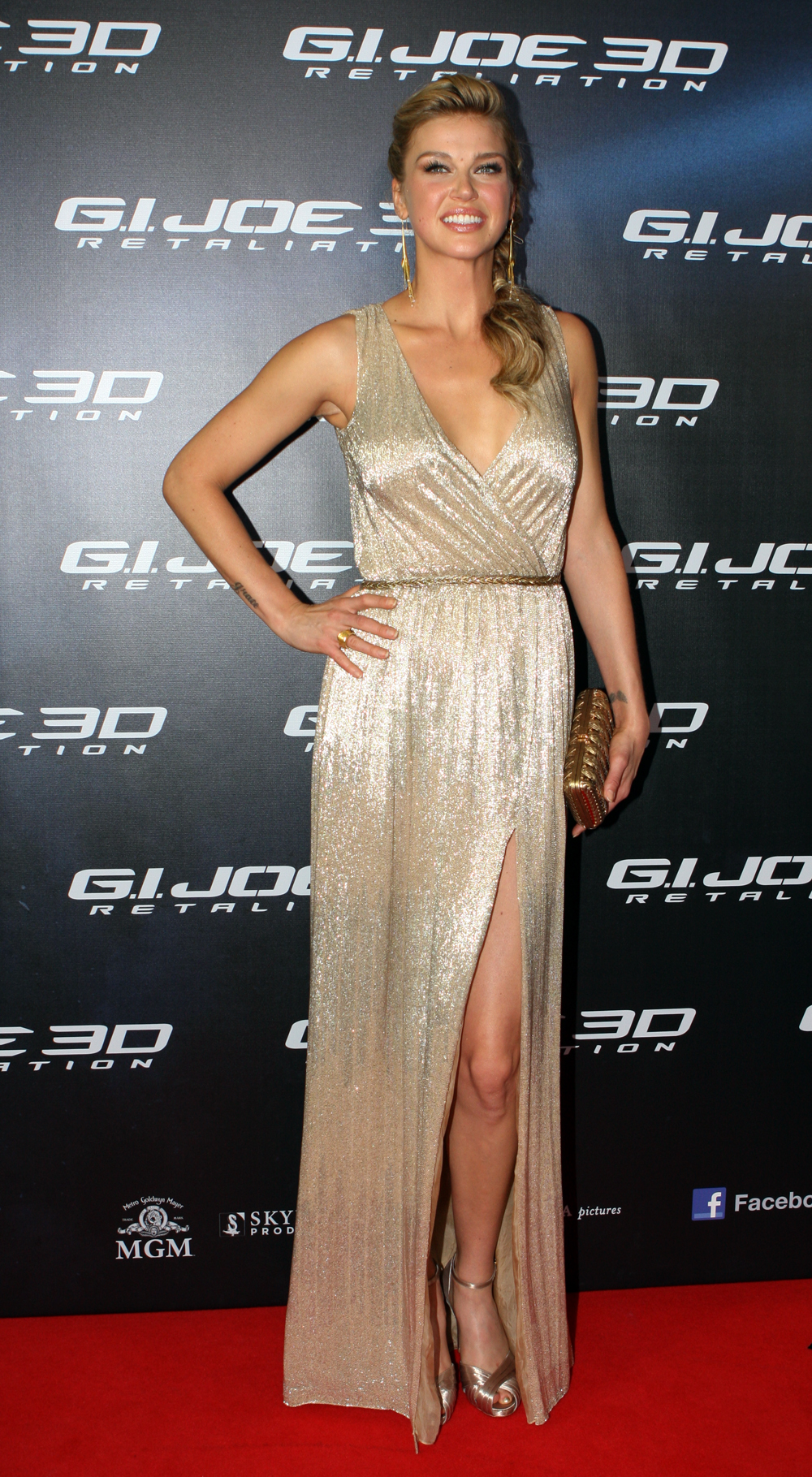
Adrianne Palicki portrays Lady Jaye in live action.

Adrianne Palicki portrays Lady Jaye in G.I. Joe: Retaliation, the sequel to G.I. Joe: The Rise of Cobra. Palicki described her character as a "tough girl", adding, "She's got a little bit of a chip on her shoulder. She's like the only chick around all these guys so she kind of has to hold her own." This version of the character is in the Marine Corps, as opposed to the previous versions being in the U.S. Army. Jaye's father was displeased at having a daughter instead of a son to carry on his family's three generations of military tradition. He died before she could rise high enough to outrank him, leaving her bitter about not having earned his final acknowledgment.

In the film, she, Roadblock and Flint are the only survivors of a military strike that kills most of the G.I. Joe Team. The Joes return to the United States and set up a base in a former community center. After the President of the United States announces that Cobra will replace G.I. Joe as the premier U.S. special forces team, Lady Jaye deduces that someone is impersonating the President. Posing as Amy Vandervoort of Fox News, she infiltrates a dinner event held by the President and dances with him, obtaining a sample of his hair in the process. Through his DNA, the Joes confirm that Zartan is impersonating the President. Lady Jaye joins General Joseph Colton in rescuing the real President, and is later promoted to Captain at a White House ceremony honoring the fallen Joes.

On February 25, 2021, it was announced Lady Jaye was to star in her own television series which would have been released on Amazon Prime Video. This was later scrapped, however, in May 2023 it was speculated that Paramount may be developing a solo film for the character.

== Reception and legacy ==
Lady Jaye has been described as one of the most prominent female characters in the G.I. Joe franchise. Commentators have noted her role as a capable field operative and one of the central female characters of the animated series. Following her appearance in G.I. Joe: Retaliation, actress Adrianne Palicki described the character as a "tough girl" and an empowering female action figure within the franchise.

In 2021, reports that a live-action television series centered on Lady Jaye was in development for Amazon Prime Video were cited as evidence of the character's continuing prominence within the G.I. Joe franchise.
