= G.I. Joe: A Real American Hero (Devil's Due Publishing) =

Comic book

- Cover to G.I. Joe A Real American Hero Vol. 2 #1. Art by J. Scott Campbell.

Publication information
- Publisher: Devil's Due Publishing; Image Comics
- Format: Ongoing series
- Genre: Military
- Publication date: October 2001 – June 2005
- No. of issues: 43
- Main characters: See List of G.I. Joe: A Real American Hero characters

Creative team
- Written by: Josh Blaylock; Brandon Jerwa
- Penciller(s): Steve Kurth; Kevin Sharpe; Brandon Badeaux; Tim Seeley
- Inker(s): John Larter; Andrew Pepoy; Cory Hamscher

G.I. Joe: A Real American Hero (also known as G.I. Joe vol. 2 or G.I. Joe: Reinstated, and later G.I. Joe: Disavowed in reprints) is a comic book that was published by Image Comics from 2001 to 2005. Based on Hasbro, Inc.'s G.I. Joe: A Real American Hero line of military-themed toys, the series picks up seven years after the end of the original comic series by Marvel Comics.

== Publication history ==
In July 2001, Devil's Due acquired the rights to G.I. Joe, and released a four-issue limited series through Image Comics, written by Josh Blaylock with John Larter and Steve Kurth as the artists. The title quickly became known to the fans as A Real American Hero vol. 2 (following from Marvel's original series), or G.I. Joe Reinstated (the title of the first four-issue arc). Strong sales on the limited series led to it being upgraded to an ongoing series, with the publication of a fifth issue and a monthly schedule.

The new series picked up seven years after the end of the Marvel Comics series, and also used elements from the animated TV series. Several older characters were featured in the title alongside several new recruits. While primarily continuing the stories from the Marvel Comics series, the success of the G.I. Joe comic allowed Devil's Due to branch out with more properties, and experiment with creating their own continuities. Devil's Due eventually broke off from Image to become their own company, and took over the publishing of the book with issue #26. The series ended with issue #43, and the introduction of a new enemy, the Red Shadows.

The series was relaunched under the title G.I. Joe: America's Elite, which lasted for 36 issues, but was canceled when Devil's Due's license with Hasbro expired in 2008 and was not renewed.

A comics convention special was released before the first issue. IDW Publishing reprinted the entirety of the Devil's Due G.I. Joe run, under a "Disavowed" banner (as IDW would begin their own continuation to the original Marvel series in 2010, which ignored the DDP run), with five trade paperback collections of the original DDP series, as well as five collections of the America's Elite series.

== Plot synopsis ==
While performing surveillance around the Dreadnok headquarters in the Florida Everglades, Kamakura finds evidence that Cobra Commander has returned to the United States. Snake Eyes forwards this information to Duke, who uses it to have the G.I. Joe Team reinstated. Signing on as commanders for the Greenshirts, are Flint, Scarlett, Roadblock, Shipwreck and Snake Eyes, while several other Joes are brought back as instructors. Meanwhile, Cobra Commander calls together the members of his organization, to let them know about his plan to take over the United States with nano-mites. Destro is the last to arrive, but after hearing the Commander's plan, he turns the tables on Cobra Commander, and takes control of Cobra.

Destro reveals a plan to take over a highly powerful communications satellite, which carries the radio waves to control nano-mites that have been planted in thousands of phones, computers and appliances. Hawk publicly announces the reinstatement of the G.I. Joe Team, which is seen by members of Cobra, including Zartan's daughter Zanya. Destro has his general Mistress Armada prepare for the arrival of G.I. Joe. A team led by Roadblock, Scarlett, Snake Eyes, Stalker and Gung-Ho suffers casualties in Florida, as Scarlett and Snake Eyes are taken prisoner by Destro, who is revealed to be Destro's son Alexander masquerading as his father.

The Joes are infected with nano-mites, as Hawk sends Kamakura and Spirit to find Cobra Commander's son Billy, who helps them rescue Scarlett and Snake Eyes, and Alexander activates the satellite system. Duke leads a second team with Flint, Shipwreck, Jinx and Rock 'n Roll to defend Washington D.C. against Cobra's forces. Meanwhile, Lifeline, Mainframe, and new recruits Daemon and Firewall figure out a way to reprogram the nano-mites. With reinforcements led by Lady Jaye, the Joes defeat Cobra, while Alexander and Mistress Armada are captured by the real Destro. Snake Eyes proposes to Scarlett.

Cobra Commander returns, accompanied by Storm Shadow, and creates plans to get revenge on both Destro and Hawk. Destro offers his prisoners to Cobra as a sign of peace, as Storm Shadow tries to assassinate Hawk, but is confronted by Snake Eyes before escaping. Zarana delivers a secret electronic device to Dr. Mindbender in Chicago, which he uses to create an all-new deadly Battle Android Trooper. The B.A.T. fights against both the Joes and the Dreadnoks, until Firefly captures it for unknown reasons. Rock 'n Roll, Mutt, Alpine and Bazooka reunite in the town of Delhi Hills, which turns out to be an underground Cobra operation.

Meanwhile, Snake Eyes, Spirit and Cover Girl are called to investigate a series of kidnapping cases. The children are eventually delivered by Hannibal to Dr. Mindbender. Flint and the Baroness are both kidnapped by the same organization in Czechoslovakia. Destro and Duke arrange for G.I. Joe, Cobra and the Oktober Guard to team up, in order to rescue them. Despite being betrayed by Lt. Gorky, Flint and the Baroness are rescued, and Daina joins the G.I. Joe team after Lt. Gorky is killed.

Storm Shadow breaks free of Cobra's mind control, and contacts Billy for help. Billy recruits Snake Eyes and Kamakura to assist him in rescuing Storm Shadow, but not before Cobra Commander brainwashes him again. A battle between Snake Eyes and Storm Shadow ends in a stalemate, leaving Storm Shadow in the control of Cobra. The nature of the kidnapped children is revealed, as Serpentor is reborn. He creates a new organization named The Coil, and captures members of both G.I. Joe and Cobra, including Cobra Commander. Both sides invade Cobra Island to rescue their comrades, but several Joes are killed, including Daemon, Flash, Mainframe, Skidmark, and Chuckles.

With Serpentor presumed dead and Cobra Commander missing, Destro assumes command of Cobra. The Joes continue to deal with remnants of The Coil in Europe and Asia. A distress call from T'Jbang leads the Joes to Tibet, where Cobra Commander and Storm Shadow are hiding with the Red Ninja clan. Snake Eyes defeats their leader Sei Tin, and becomes the new master of the Red Ninja clan.

Five new Joes are introduced, including Barrel Roll. They are sent on a mission to Cobra Island, where Cobra Commander has returned to power, and Barrel Roll infiltrates Cobra. Meanwhile, Destro leaves Cobra, and seems to be involved with a battle in Sierra Gordo, where a team of Joes is helping the invaders. Another team of Joes encounters Overkill in Badhikstan, where he is defeated, and his life is spared by Snake Eyes. Destro is double-crossed by the president of Sierra Gordo, and arrested by Duke. Destro makes a deal to deliver Cobra Commander, while secretly hiring a mercenary named Wraith to rescue Scrap-Iron and Major Bludd from Blackgate prison. The Joes confront Cobra, and Destro is traded for Cobra Commander, but not before the Commander shoots Hawk in the back, and in turn is shot from behind by the Baroness.

Hawk survives, but is paralyzed with an unretractable bullet lodged in his spine. General Joseph Colton returns to fill in for Hawk as commander of the team. A team of Joes is sent to New Moon, Colorado to investigate another Cobra front. After a battle there with Cobra forces, the town is destroyed, and G.I. Joe is set up to take the blame. Several Joes are arrested, and the roster is cut severely. Destro consolidates his power within the Cobra organization, and discovers that his wife the Baroness is pregnant. Duke and Snake Eyes are rescued by Scarlett and Storm Shadow, as Cobra Commander is freed by the Dreadnoks, and revealed to have been Zartan in disguise.

Meanwhile, an Army general named Philip Rey defeats Cobra forces in Turkey, and a group of G.I. Joe and Cobra forces are killed in Brazil by an unknown organization. Cobra Commander takes back complete control of Cobra, and sends a unit to destroy The Pit. General Rey is made the new leader of the G.I. Joe Team, as Cobra discovers a weather control weapon named the Tempest, and moves it to their new Monolith Base in Badhikstan. G.I. Joe drops a nuclear bomb on Cobra Island, killing what's left of The Coil army. Cobra uses the Tempest to unleash the Deathangel Virus on the county of Badhi, as G.I. Joe attacks Cobra's new stronghold. Cobra Commander escapes, but not before shooting Dr. Mindbender, who dies helping G.I. Joe to disable the Tempest.

The Red Shadows organization finally steps forward, targeting members of both G.I. Joe and Cobra. They also assassinate The Jugglers, a group of generals who had been manipulating G.I. Joe from behind the scenes, and had been hiding Serpentor's recovered body. Hawk is targeted, but is rescued from the Red Shadows by Scarlett, Snake Eyes and Kamakura. A G.I. Joe informant is also assassinated by Dela Eden, who escapes from Duke and Flint. Dela spies on G.I. Joe, and follows Flint and Lady Jaye home to their off-base residence. Dela attempts to kill Flint, but is stopped by Lady Jaye, who is then stabbed by Dela Eden and dies. Dela is captured by Scarlett, who forms a plan with Flint and Hawk to investigate the Red Shadows organization, while Duke and General Rey interrogate Dela. The Red Shadows rescue Dela, and Scarlett tracks them to New York, where Flint has taken it upon himself to get revenge. Flint is captured, but uses a tracker to lead G.I. Joe to the Red Shadows headquarters. Flint refuses to kill Dela, even though he has the opportunity, and the leader of the Red Shadows Wilder Vaughn escapes. G.I. Joe is then deactivated by order of the President, given that Cobra as an organization has fractured, although Cobra Commander remains at large.

== Spin-offs ==
=== Battle Files ===
G.I. Joe: Battle Files gave profiles of the G.I. Joe and Cobra teams, as well as information on their vehicles. Published in 2002, issue #1 featured the Joes, while issue #2 featured Cobra and issue #3 featured weapons and tech. A Sourcebook trade paperback was published in February 2003, which collected issues one through three, with additional profiles added.

=== Frontline ===
G.I. Joe: Frontline lasted eighteen issues, and featured a rotating creative team for every story. The stories explored what happened to G.I. Joe and Cobra concurrently with the main title's continuity, with the exception of the first arc, which was written by Larry Hama, "The Mission That Never Was", a four-part series set one month after the events of the Marvel series' issue #155.

=== Master & Apprentice ===
G.I. Joe: Master & Apprentice, was a four-issue limited series written by Brandon Jerwa, with artwork by Stefano Caselli and Sunder Raj. It told the story about how Snake Eyes met and trained his apprentice Kamakura. A second series, also written by Brandon Jerwa with artwork by Chris Stevens and Eric Vedder, focused on Storm Shadow and his apprentice/lover Junko Akita.

== Collected editions ==
Title (Trade Paperback)	Material collected	Publication date	ISBN
G.I. Joe: Disavowed Volume 1	G.I. Joe: A Real American Hero Vol. 2 #1-5	2010	978-1600106583
G.I. Joe: Disavowed Volume 2	G.I. Joe: A Real American Hero Vol. 2 #6-13	2011	978-1600107962
G.I. Joe: Disavowed Volume 3	G.I. Joe: A Real American Hero Vol. 2 #14-19	2011	978-1600109010
G.I. Joe: Disavowed Volume 4	G.I. Joe: A Real American Hero Vol. 2 #20-26	2011	978-1613770467
G.I. Joe: Disavowed Volume 5	G.I. Joe: A Real American Hero Vol. 2 #27-32	2012	978-1613771334
G.I. Joe: Disavowed Volume 6	G.I. Joe: A Real American Hero Vol. 2 #34-38	2012	978-1613772225
G.I. Joe: Disavowed Volume 7	G.I. Joe: A Real American Hero Vol. 2 #39-42	2013	978-1613775622
G.I. Joe: Frontline Vol. 1 - The Mission That Never Was	G.I. Joe: Frontline #1-4	2003	978-1582403007
G.I. Joe: Frontline Vol. 2 - Icebound	G.I. Joe: Frontline #5-8	2004	978-1932796148
G.I. Joe: Frontline Vol. 3 - History Repeating	G.I. Joe: Frontline #11-14	2004	978-1932796124
G.I. Joe: Frontline Vol. 4 - One-Shots	G.I. Joe: Frontline #9, 10, 15-18	2004	978-1932796162

== See also ==
- G.I. Joe (comics)
- G.I. Joe: America's Elite
