= Rock 'n Roll (G.I. Joe) =

Character in G.I. Joe

Rock 'N Roll
- G.I. Joe character
- Illustration of Rock 'n Roll from G.I. Joe: Order of Battle. Art by Herb Trimpe.
- First appearance: G.I. Joe: A Real American Hero issue #1 (June 1982)
- Voiced by: Frank Welker (Sunbow/Marvel mini-series), Will Ryan (Sunbow/Marvel, regular series); Kevin Conway (DiC)

In-universe information
- Affiliation: G.I. Joe
- Specialty: Machine Gunner
- File name: McConnel, Craig S.
- Birth place: Malibu, California
- SN: RA989091452
- Rank: E-5 (Sergeant) (1982); E-6 (Staff Sergeant) (1989); E-9 (Sergeant Major) (1991); E-4 (Corporal) (1993); E-7 (Sergeant First Class) (1997)
- Primary MOS: Infantry
- Secondary MOS: PT Instructor
- Subgroups: Star Brigade

Rock 'n Roll is a fictional character from the G.I. Joe: A Real American Hero toyline, comic books and animated series. He is the G.I. Joe Team's original machine gunner and debuted in 1982.

== Profile ==
His real name is Craig S. McConnel, and his rank is that of Sergeant (later promoted to Staff Sergeant). Rock 'n Roll was born in Malibu, California.

Rock 'n Roll's primary military specialty is infantry, and his secondary military specialty is PT instructor. He is familiar with all NATO and Warsaw Pact light and heavy machine guns (he often used the M60). He graduated top of his class from advanced infantry training, and received specialized education in covert ops school at Langley. In time, Rock 'n Roll moved on from being a machine gunner to a Gatling gunner.

A surfer, weightlifter, and bassist, Rock 'n Roll is cunning but naive, and forceful but shy. He possesses a strong sense of loyalty to his teammates and is sincerely concerned about their well-being. Rock 'n Roll is a man of honor and integrity who can be counted on to hold the line.

== Toy history ==
Rock 'n Roll was first released as an action figure in 1982. His character was re-issued with a new action figure design in 1989, with a slight name change to Rock & Roll, however, his file card's content continued to maintain the code name Rock 'n Roll. The name change was temporary, as the next few editions of his action figure all used the Rock 'n Roll name. The character also became part of Super Sonic Fighters (1991), and Star Brigade (1993) sub-lines.

== Comics ==
=== Marvel Comics ===
In the Marvel Comics G.I. Joe series, he first appeared in G.I. Joe: A Real American Hero #1 (June 1982), along with the rest of the original team. He participates in the rescue of nuclear physicist and noted peace activist Adele Burkhart from a minor Cobra facility. Adele is rescued safely, only suffering from a gunshot wound to the arm.

Rock 'n Roll is featured in the Joes' second recorded adventure. He, Snake Eyes, and Scarlett are far behind enemy lines and low on ammunition. Needing to get valuable info back to friendly territory, Scarlett orders both of them, at gunpoint, to run to the rendezvous, leaving her to fight a rearguard action. As they jog through the desert, Rock 'n Roll begs Snake Eyes to be allowed to go back to help Scarlett, but finds he is talking to empty air as Snake Eyes already has left. Rock 'n Roll finishes his mission, then steals a Joe motorcycle. He arrives just in time to kill another wave of enemy soldiers and rescue his friends. Reinforcements endanger all three, until Hawk, bending orders himself, arrives in the V.A.M.P. in time to save them.

A flashback reveals that around this time, Rock 'n Roll is part of the mission where, due to a helicopter crash, Snake Eyes loses his ability to speak. Grunt and Scarlett are with them as well.

The Joe team manages to capture Cobra Commander for a time, and Rock 'n Roll is assigned to be one of his guards; however, the Cobra ninja Storm Shadow rescues the Commander. Some time after, Rock 'n Roll and the other original thirteen Joes save for Snake Eyes and Hawk, are taken off field duty. While on leave and headed for Malibu, Cobra mercenaries called Dreadnoks run Rock 'n Roll's classic 1956 Bel Air Nomad off the road. He and his two friends, Clutch and Breaker are injured. Spotting the Dreadnoks while in an ambulance, Rock 'n Roll commandeers the vehicle and chases them down, resulting in the capture of the Dreadnok Buzzer.

He would later be featured in a multiple-issue storyline where he and Clutch find the Cobra-owned town of Broca Beach. Rock 'n Roll realizes the Broca Beach police are Cobra agents by a ring they sport. They are recognized as Joes and captured by the Dreadnoks. They are brainwashed by the Baroness, using an old device left behind by the evil scientist Doctor Venom. The two later escape.

They team up with Canadian police officers to destroy a Cobra distribution facility in Canada. Broca Beach is read from documentation, causing odd headaches with the pair.

In a later attack on a Joe facility, the Baroness manages to activate the duo's hypnotic suggestions, which was to kill and destroy. Unknown to the Baroness, Rock 'n Roll and Clutch were minding visitors to the base. Unwitting visitors, two young girls who had gotten in way over their heads. The presence of the girls helped to break the brainwashing, as the inherent decency of the two men would not allow them to kill innocent teenagers, no matter how intense the brainwashing.

=== Devil's Due ===
Rock 'n Roll was one of the first Joes called back into active duty when the team was reassembled in the new series by Devil's Due. While the team was inactive, Rock 'n Roll had stayed in the military and had been required to shave his beard. He was happy to rejoin the team as it gave him a chance to regrow his beard. Rock 'N Roll meets many new Joes, collectively referred to as 'Greenshirts'. He is one of the few Joes left when a nanite-ambush leaves most of the team incapacitated. A nanite attack on the country leaves the White House open to a literal Cobra take-over. The Joes join with many other military forces and successfully defend it. Rock 'n Roll believes he is escorting the Secretary of Defense to safety; it is really Zartan who knocks him out and flees.

Rock 'n Roll was part of a group of Joes that went to Chicago and battled not only the Dreadnoks but an out of control Battle Android Trooper as well.

In the next two issues, Rock 'n Roll would be instrumental in discovering a Cobra town. Spending a vacation with Alpine, Mutt and Bazooka, they decide to go to a local bar. The bartender's odd behavior leads Rock 'n Roll to investigate. A Cobra ring is spotted on the man's finger and a confrontation breaks out, as the other bar patrons are Cobra agents. Rock 'n Roll takes the bartender hostage but none of the other agents care.

Bazooka, who had been in the restroom, is hit with a bottle from behind and knocked out; the Cobra agents tie him up in a cold storage room. In the basement facility, the awake Joes are questioned and beaten by Cobra agents. One questions why the Joes are not simply shot and is told that they are being kept alive by strict orders. Years before, Cobra Commander had failed to make his orders clear and several Joe team members were executed.

Cobra Commander himself arrives to question the group. Upstairs, Bazooka, who had been pretending to be unconscious, escapes and kills several Cobra agents. He starts a destructive fight with Big Boa. The Joes take advantage of this distraction and though tied up, subdue many of their captors and ultimately escape. Afterward, there is no sign of Cobra, not even the remains of the soldiers Bazooka killed. The foursome's veteran status is enough for their story to be believed.

==== America's Elite ====
Rock 'n Roll is a reserve member of the Joes in the America's Elite series. He gets called into action alongside Clutch, Gung-Ho, and Wild-Bill in the Special Missions: Japan one-shot comic to help Jinx and Budo stop a plot to overthrow the Japanese government. Despite the quartet's lack of stealth skills, Rock 'n Roll and his fellow Joes manage to disguise themselves as obnoxious American businessmen and start a fight in the office of a Japanese businessman who is behind the conspiracy. This distraction allows Jinx to infiltrate the facility. The entire group is captured but manage to break out when it is revealed that Mistress Armada was secretly backing the coup. The Joes soon restore order with help from the Japanese military.

Rock 'n Roll and Clutch are reactivated again during the World War 3 storyline. The duo head to Turkey where they team up with MOSSAD agent Ibraham. They investigate a bombing which Ibraham believes might snowball into World War 3. Later, they team with the other Joes to stop an assassination attempt at the Israeli 'Wailing Wall'. and battle The Plague, an elite Cobra team. While the main Joe force returns to the States, Rock 'n Roll and Clutch remain in the Middle East with Ibraham. The three of them celebrate once Cobra is finally defeated.

==== G.I. Joe Declassified ====
Rock 'n Roll is featured in this Devil's Due look back at the early days of the Joe team. He, Stalker, Grunt and Zap had been sent into Sierra Gordo to observe the local Liberation Front. While discovering the front was actually a murderous terrorist group, they are discovered by enemy forces and forced to retreat. The group is confronted with many problems, such as backup being very far away and Stalker's insistence on carrying a wounded prisoner.

==== G.I. Joe Reloaded ====
Rock 'n Roll is heavily featured in the alternate continuity of G.I. Joe: Reloaded as he tries to track down a seeming traitor within the team. His service history is changed as he is a former Petty Officer First Class from SEAL Team 8. Traveling alone for some time, he deals with Snake Eyes, who is a suspect.

=== Novel ===
Rock'N'Roll is a supporting character in the 'Find Your Fate' novel "Operation: Dragon Fire".

== Animated series ==
=== Sunbow ===
Rock 'n Roll appeared in the original G.I. Joe animated series. Rock 'n Roll first appeared in the A Real American Hero mini-series. He was voiced by Frank Welker in the first appearance, but then Will Ryan took over the part.

Rock 'n Roll had a major role in the episode "Jungle Trap", in which he is part of a group of Joes on a mission to escort the scientist Dr. Shakur, and later to rescue him when he is captured by Cobra.

==== G.I. Joe: The Movie ====
Rock 'n Roll briefly appeared in the 1987 animated film G.I. Joe: The Movie. He is present at Lt. Falcon's court-martial and later participates in the lab battle. He is also present when a critically injured Duke falls into a coma.

=== DiC ===
Rock 'n Roll appeared in the DiC G.I. Joe animated series, voiced by Kevin Conway.

=== Resolute ===
Rock 'n Roll appeared in G.I. Joe: Resolute along with the many Joes seen on the U.S.S. Flagg, looking at footage of Moscow's destruction by Cobra's new Particle Weapon.

== Video games ==
Rock 'n Roll is featured as a playable character in the 1991 G.I. Joe video game created for the Nintendo Entertainment System.
