= World War III (G.I. Joe) =

2007–2008 comic book storyline

- Cover to G.I. Joe: America's Elite #25, depicting every single G.I. Joe character to appear in every incarnation of G.I. Joe up to the date of publication. Art by Chris Lie.
- Publisher: Devil's Due Publishing
- Publication date: July 2007 – June 2008
- Genre: Military science fiction
Title(s)
G.I. Joe: America's Elite #25-36
- Main character(s): G.I. Joe; Cobra Command

Creative team
- Writer: Mark Powers
- Penciller(s): Mike Bear; Mike Shoyket; Pat Quinn
- Letterer(s): Brian J. Crowley; Dave Rothe
- Colorist: Jean-Francois Beaulieu
- Editor: Mike O'Sullivan
- G.I. Joe: America's Elite Volume 5: World War III Omnibus: ISBN 978-1-934692-02-8

World War III is the title of a 12-issue comic book story that took place in issues #25-36 of the comic G.I. Joe: America's Elite, published by Devil's Due Publishing. The plot concerns Cobra Command's final attempt to take over the world. Originally begun to commemorate the 25th anniversary of the G.I. Joe: A Real American Hero franchise, World War III was originally intended to mark the end of the original G.I. Joe comic continuity, which began under Larry Hama under Marvel Comics, before the license was acquired by IDW Publishing, who opted to disregard the entirety of the Devil's Due run in favor of their own continuation comic of the Marvel continuity, again written by Hama. IDW would republish this story arc, alongside the rest of America's Elite and the previous series, under the G.I. Joe: Disavowed title.

== Plot ==
After Destro and Baroness turn over control of M.A.R.S. to Cobra Commander in exchange for their kidnapped son, he uses the weapons to create conflict all over the globe, in a last bid to gain control of the world. General Joseph Colton responds to Cobra Commander's threat, by being more proactive. He increases the main roster, by returning Cover Girl, Wild Bill, and Gung-Ho to active duty, and using a threat index that lists all known enemy agents, the Joes start hunting down every member of Cobra that they can find. Flint leads a team to Dagestan, and captures Cobra Mortal and Ghost Bear, while Snake Eyes and Scarlett capture Vypra. Meanwhile, Cobra Commander recruits soldier Nick Bailey, making him the last member of a new elite Cobra unit code-named "The Plague".

Lorcan Rourke, aka Agent Delta, comes out of hiding to warn G.I. Joe about World War III. He had been assigned by General Flagg to infiltrate Cobra years ago, but went dark after being unhinged by the experience. The Joes deliver Major Bludd to a prison in Greenland code-named "The Coffin", created to hold all of their captured enemies. Snake Eyes and Scarlett capture Firefly in Japan, while General Colton sends Cover Girl and Shipwreck after Skull Buster. Clutch and Rock 'n Roll uncover a Cobra plot in Turkey, and Duke receives a message about his father being in trouble. While Duke is taking his father home, Cobra agent Interrogator captures Duke and tries to obtain information on G.I. Joe's Middle East operations.

With approval from the President, General Colton contacts nearly every Joe still alive, and deploys the team all over the world, including Russia where Lt. Falcon and Vorona team up with her old friends in the Oktober Guard. Roadblock rescues Duke from Interrogator, while Black Out sneaks onto a Russian sub, kills the crew, then fires missiles at Boston, causing massive destruction. This leads the President to declare that America is at war. The main team heads to Israel, where they meet Agent Delta face to face, and help stop an assassination attempt. While the team is away, Cobra Commander attacks Washington, D.C., taking over the White House and capturing the President.

More Cobra forces attack The Rock, causing General Colton, Jane, Hawk, and Sparks to retreat. Cobra also takes over Fort Meade, while Alexander McCullen attacks London and France with the Iron Grenadiers. The Joes in the Middle East run into The Plague. The battle is stalemated, and eventually the Joes split up and try to head back to the States. Meanwhile, Storm Shadow gets a mysterious phone call, and heads to The Coffin. There he tries to prevent Tomax and a squad of Night Creepers from freeing all the prisoners. Tomax manages to free Major Bludd and several others, while killing those Cobra Commander considered "loose ends". Storm Shadow makes Tomax retreat, by threatening to kill his comatose brother Xamot. Tomax leaves with Xamot and only the prisoners that he's freed. Storm Shadow then meets his mystery contact, a Joe disguised as a Cobra Trooper, who gives Storm Shadow information on The Plague.

On returning to The Rock, Storm Shadow is then tasked with finding Destro and the Baroness, so that they can help disable Cobra's M.A.R.S. tech devices. Dela Eden, who had been freed from The Coffin by Cobra Commander, is also recruited to find Destro and the Baroness, in order to kill them. Zartan discovers that Monkeywrench was killed in The Coffin raid. Cobra takes over several nuclear arsenals, including one in Suffolk, England. As a warning, Cobra Commander detonates a nuclear bomb in The Empty Quarter, and then broadcasts an ultimatum on television for world leaders to accede to his authority, or he will start choosing populated targets.

Duke and Agent Delta make it back to New York, where they face The Plague. They escape, thanks to help from some armed New York civilians. Storm Shadow runs into Dela Eden. He defeats her in battle, and then finds Destro and the Baroness in Japan, where he convinces them to help. Billy, Cobra Commander's son, confronts his father and tries to kill him. He fails, and Cobra Commander kills him instead, hanging Billy's body from a flagpole, with a message that no one is untouchable. Meanwhile, the mystery undercover Joe helps another undercover Joe steal a M.A.R.S.-modified Night Raven.

The main team reunites in Priest Lake, Idaho, where Storm Shadow arrives with Destro and the Baroness, and the Joes find out about a plan by Cobra Commander to blow up nukes in the Amazon and Antarctica. The team splits up, and battles The Plague in both locations. The stolen Night Raven is delivered to Destro, with Barrel Roll being revealed as the pilot. Destro, Sparks, and Firewall disable the M.A.R.S. tech, giving the Joes victory in the air war in Europe. In the Amazon, the Joes deactivate the nuke, and Storm Shadow kills Incision of The Plague. The Antarctic unit is also successful. General Colton leads a small unit in retaking Fort Meade, and at Spirit's suggestion, they take care of Billy's body.

Destro and the Baroness lead her troops, code-named "Athena", in retaking London from Alexander. The Iron Grenadiers surrender when they see the elder Destro. Alexander tries to walk away, but is shot by Mistress Armada, who is then shot by the Baroness. Meanwhile, Cobra Commander and The Plague retreat to a secret base in the Appalachian Mountains, where the first Cobra soldiers were trained. Agent Delta leads the G.I. Joe team to the base, as the rest of the Joes shatter Cobra's defenses around the world. When the Joes attack the Appalachian base, Major Bludd is revealed to be Zartan in disguise, who impersonated the Major to get revenge on Cobra Commander for killing Monkeywrench. Zartan calls in the Dreadnoks to help the Joes. The real Major Bludd returns, and tries to kill Sparks, but is stopped by the undercover Joe, who is revealed as Recondo. Barrel Roll defeats his brother Black Out, Storm Shadow takes out Scrap-Iron, and Snake Eyes defeats Firefly in a sword duel. Agent Delta convinces Nick Bailey to surrender. Zartan escapes, and General Colton is shot in the back by Cobra Commander, but survives. The battle ends, when Hawk tackles Cobra Commander, and knocks him out with a punch to the face.

In the aftermath, the Joes are still active and fully funded. Destro turns himself in. Major Bludd and several Cobra agents are back in The Coffin and Cobra Commander is locked away in a special underwater prison.

== The Plague ==
During the events of "World War III", Cobra Commander formed an elite team of specialists, drawn from the various Cobra forces. The Plague is composed of:

- Bayonet - a former Snow Serpent
- Black Out - a former Joe recruit who defected to Cobra
- Body Bags - a former Range-Viper
- Gallows - a former S.A.W. Viper
- Grim Skull - a former Sand Viper
- Guillotine - a former Eel who becomes the leader of The Plague
- Incision - Aleph, the former leader of the Night Creepers
- Infraed - a former member of the Crimson Guard
- Interrogator
- Munitia
- Vanguard - Lt. Nick Bailey, a new Cobra recruit
- Vector - a former Laser-Viper
- Velocity - a former A.V.A.C.

Additionally, Sky Creeper and Rip It were under consideration for the group, but after expressing doubts during their introductory mission, they fail the evaluation and are killed.

== Reception ==
The series was generally well received by critics. In August 2007, soon after the storyline began, America's Elite was chosen as "Book of the Month" in Wizard magazine, and it was #94 on Comic Book Resources' list of the "Best 100 Comics of 2008".

Brian LeTendre of Comic Book Resources described it as, "a great end to a great run", and a review by OAFE called it a "good globetrotting adventure" with "unbelievable" scope, that "absolutely lives up to its name and premise".

== Collected editions ==
- G.I. Joe: America's Elite Volume 5: World War III Omnibus - (328 pages, July 2008, ISBN 978-1-934692-02-8, Devil's Due Publishing)
