= Slice (G.I. Joe) =

Fictional character from G.I. Joe franchise

- G.I. Joe character
- Slice as seen in the DiC G.I. Joe cartoon.
- First appearance: 1992
- Portrayed by: Don Brown (DiC); Kevan Ohtsji (Valor vs. Venom)

In-universe information
- Affiliation: Cobra
- Specialty: Cobra Ninja Swordsman
- File name: Unknown
- Birth place: Jonestown, U.K.
- Primary MOS: Swordsman
- Secondary MOS: Espionage
- Subgroups: Ninja Force

Slice is a fictional character from the G.I. Joe: A Real American Hero toyline, comic books and animated series. He is affiliated with Cobra as a ninja swordsman, and debuted in 1992.

== Profile ==
Slice is believed to be a renegade ninja from the Arashikage clan. He is considered Cobra's supreme swordsman. He doesn't know the more silent and subtle ways of the ninja, but he compensates for it with raw strength. His sword attack copies the attack patterns of the scorpions. He is seen, normally, wearing an uwagi bearing Cobra's emblem over ninja garbs, and he prefers driving the vehicle called "Cobra Parasite".

== Toys ==
Slice was first released as part of the Ninja Force line in 1992. The figure was repainted and released as part of the Ninja Force line in 1993. The figure was repainted again and released as part of the Shadow Ninjas line in 1994. Slice was released in a two pack with the G.I. Joe criminal investigation officer, Sure-Fire. The file card text indicates Sure-Fire once defeated Slice in combat, now the ninja yearns for revenge.

== Comics ==
=== Marvel Comics ===
Slice and his partner Dice debut in the Marvel Comics G.I. Joe series. They first came into contact with Cobra and G.I. Joe, when a man calling himself the Red Ninja Master called them and a number of Red Ninjas to Cobra's Silent Castle in Trans-Carpathia. The Master displayed an in-depth knowledge of many of the Arashikage fighting techniques, and convinced the other ninjas of his identity. Since Cobra Commander hadn't used the castle for years, Slice, Dice and the Red Ninjas easily ventured to the castle. Slice and Dice were surprised when Destro and the Baroness arrived at the castle after Destro was given the castle by Cobra Commander. When Slice, Dice and the other ninjas attacked Destro, they discovered the Joes had been watching, including Ninja Force. After a long battle, the ninjas escaped the castle into the wilderness with the Ninja Force close behind.

After Snake Eyes defeated Slice in a duel to settle their dispute, the Red Ninja Master arrived and revealed himself to be Firefly. The mercenary had fooled the ninjas and after a brief fight, ambushed both groups of ninjas with his B.A.T.s and knocked them out with gas. He used Cobra's Brain-wave Scanner to turn Slice and the others into his brainwashed slaves, and headed to Cobra Island, long since unoccupied by Cobra. The Ninja Force eventually broke free, but Slice, Dice and the Red Ninjas remained under his control for a time. After a small team of Joes landed on the island and fought B.A.T.s and ninjas, Firefly's hold was broken. Slice and Dice escaped, and eventually joined Cobra.

Since most of Cobra's high command had turned their backs on the Commander, Slice and Dice worked closely with the Commander for a time, joining in the fight against Joes in the Cobra-controlled town of Millville, among other operations. During the operation in Millville, Scarlett infiltrated within Cobra, but Slice and Zarana knew it was a ruse. When Snake Eyes was forced to stab Scarlett (in order to keep her cover), Slice recognized that the wound was not intended to be fatal. Slice and Dice eventually left Cobra some time before the organization was scattered by an attack from regular military forces.

=== IDW Publishing ===
Slice appears along with Dice in issue #0 of IDW Publishing's Cobra Civil War. They ambush and wipe out most of Snake Eyes team of students, including Dojo, Banzai, Nunchuk, T'Gin Zu and T'Jbang under orders of Raja Khallikhan.

== Animated series ==
=== DiC ===
Slice appeared in the DiC G.I. Joe episode "The Sword" (voiced by Scott McNeil), along with his partner Dice and Night Creeper Leader. In the episode, he is mistakenly referred to as Dice, while Dice is referred to as Slice.

=== Valor vs. Venom ===
Slice appears in the movie G.I. Joe: Valor vs. Venom voiced by Kevan Ohtsji, with a different appearance, and accompanied by a ninja named Slash. Each ninja behaves very politely with his partner, in a humorous way. Slice and Slash are first seen taking a G.I. Joe base and are briefly incapacitated by Tunnel Rat. Later they capture Tunnel Rat and guard him while he is waiting to be killed by the rain bomb when Snake Eyes, Jinx, and Kamakura arrive and defeat Slash and Slice. They also appear in the short film G.I. Joe: Ninja Battles taking place in the same continuity helping Storm Shadow attack the Joes along with other Cobra's ninja members. The ninjas are eventually driven off by Snake Eyes, Jinx, and Tiger Claw.
