= Kamakura (G.I. Joe) =

- G.I. Joe character
- First appearance: 1984; 2003 (as Kamakura)
- Voiced by: Kevin Ohjitsu (Valor vs. Venom); Marc Thompson (Sigma 6)

In-universe information
- Affiliation: G.I. Joe
- Specialty: Ninja (2003); Ninja Apprentice (2004)
- File name: Classified (Sean M. Collins)
- Birth place: Classified (Roseville, California)
- SN: Classified
- Rank: E-5 (Sergeant)
- Primary MOS: Infantry
- Secondary MOS: Intelligence
- Subgroups: Hammer Team, Arashikage Clan
- Series: A Real American Hero; Sigma 6

Kamakura is a fictional character from the G.I. Joe: A Real American Hero toyline, comic books and animated series. He is the first character created by Devil's Due Publishing to be made into a G.I. Joe figure, and later brought into the new animated series.

== Profile ==
Kamakura is an apprentice to Snake Eyes and a character of the G.I. Joe comic book series. His file cards list his true name and birthplace as classified. In comics by Devil's Due Publishing, he is revealed to be Sean Collins (Broca), the son of the original Fred Broca, a Crimson Guardsman who looked exactly like the rest of the "Fred series". His father is killed and later replaced by Fred II, who is later revealed to be Wade Collins, a war buddy of Snake Eyes and Stalker. Kamakura appeared in the Marvel Comics stories as Sean Broca, but did not become a ninja until the "Master & Apprentice" miniseries. He is a member of the Arashikage clan (as noted by the tattoo on his arm).

== Toys ==
Kamakura was the first character created by Devil's Due Publishing to be made into a figure by Hasbro in 2003. Since then, he has had four figures made in the 3 3/4" line. He is a ninja and is packed with an assortment of ninja weapons and an Uzi submachine gun. This is very similar to his master, Snake Eyes.

=== The Rise of Cobra ===
A Kamakura figure was released in the fall of 2009 as part of the G.I. Joe: The Rise of Cobra toy line.

=== G.I. Joe: Retaliation ===
A Kamakura action figure was released in the Ninja Dojo 3 pack as part of the "G.I. Joe: Retaliation" toy line.

=== G.I. Joe Classified ===
A Kamakura figure was released in 2022 as part of the G. I. Joe Classified toy line, as an Amazon exclusive.

== Comics ==
=== Marvel Comics ===
Kamakura never appeared during this series as a ninja. Instead, his youth was explored through his ties to Snake Eyes and his Vietnam buddy Wade Collins being involved in the Fred Series.

Sean Collins was originally Sean Broca, the son of a Fred Series Crimson Guard. All of the Fred Series look alike and when he was killed in combat with the G.I. Joe Team, Fred was later replaced by Fred II. This person was later revealed to be Wade Collins.

In the last issue of the Marvel series, Sean writes Snake Eyes a letter to get his opinion on being a soldier, as Sean wants to enlist in the army when he turns 17. Snake Eyes writes him back, one of only two times the internal thoughts of Snake Eyes are revealed (the other being a recon report from issue 4).

=== Devil's Due Publishing ===
==== The Years In Between: Master & Apprentice ====
It was revealed in this 4 issue miniseries "Master & Apprentice" that Sean joined the elite Hammer Team, a replacement for the deactivated G. I. Joe. During one of the first missions of the group, all but Sean are seemingly killed during an attack by the terrorist Firefly. In the same operation, the first new Arashikage student trained by Snake Eyes, Ophelia, was also killed. In response Snake Eyes leaves Scarlett on the day of their wedding and seeks solitude in his mountain cabin. Sean Collins finds him and requests that he trains him so that he can avenge Hammer Team. After a mission with Duke and Chuckles that results in Wade Collins' death (when Wade infiltrated a Cobra sleeper cell and helped shut it down), Sean takes the name Kamakura. Kamakura would later join G.I. Joe and would be the first character created by Devil's Due Publishing that would be made into a figure. Later, Kamakura saves General Hawk's life by wounding Overkill, an enemy soldier who, earlier, personally killed three Joes.

==== Reinstatement - Devils Due ====
His first appearance in the comic series is when he spies on the Everglades compound of the Dreadnoks for the benefit of his sensei, the 'Silent Master', a man later revealed to be Snake Eyes. His intelligence show Cobra operatives working with the wide-ranging biker bang. Kamakura is later seen as one of the new recruits to the Joe team, standing side by side with other new Joes; they are commonly called 'Greenshirts'. General Hawk expresses concern at Kamakura at first, not wanting more of the 'Ninja Force' that the Joes had recruited earlier; he calls Kamakura the 'Green Power Ranger'. Duke vouches for him.

He is one of the participants in an attack on the Dreadnoks. The Joes lose several Greenshirts while many Cobra Vipers and Dreadnoks die; Kamakura personally kills at least two.

The Joe survivors and their Cobra prisoners become infected with microscopic nanites. Kamakura manages to escape this, as he was just out of range. He is sent with Spirit to recover Billy, the ninja son of Cobra Commander. The trio rescue Snake Eyes and Scarlett from Cobra forces; they dress up like Iron Grenadiers to do so.

Later, Kamakura is the main ninja for the Joe team for some time, as Snake Eyes is mysteriously AWOL and Storm Shadow is working for Cobra yet again. The latter attempts to penetrate Joe Headquarters and slay General Hawk. Kamakura, along with other Joes such as Flint, Shipwreck, Clutch, Beachhead, and many Greenshirts work together to stop him. Kamakura has several confrontations with Storm Shadow; at one point the ninja only wounds him instead of delivering a deadly blow. Unexpectedly, Snake Eyes does show up. This helps drive off Storm Shadow.

==== America’s Elite - Devils Due ====
After G.I. Joe is brought back to active duty as a much leaner team, Kamakura is set to reserve member status. However, after Snake Eyes is seemingly killed in a mission to save Scarlett, Kamakura is reactivated to serve with Storm Shadow, giving G.I. Joe two ninjas. He has since remained an active reservist throughout the recent missions, but has not gone on any side missions.

After the mandatory time off as a result of the Rock being infiltrated by Cobra agents, Kamakura spent time with Snake Eyes trying in vain to convince Snake Eyes not to give up on his ninja training. When the active members return to duty after this break, Kamakura is again on reserves.

=== IDW Publishing ===
In 2009, IDW Publishing took over the license for G.I. Joe comics, and started a new series that continues where the Marvel Comics series ended, disregarding the Devil's Due series altogether. As a result, in this particular series, Sean Collins does not become Kamakura.

Sean is reintroduced in issue #206, when Scarlett and Snake Eyes spot him on their way back to Fort Wadsworth, in full Army dress uniform and standing outside his former home. Scarlett comes up with a plan to get them inside, claiming they are investigating a possible hazardous material leak from the fort. Sean is able to sneak into his father's hidden basement, only to discover that the family living there now has been planted by Cobra, just as his family had been. He then goes back to the fort with the Joes, where he discusses his service in Afghanistan with the Joes, and reveals his findings from the basement.

After Snake Eyes and Scarlett return from a mission in Dublin, Sean receives orders to report for inspector cadre at a new training facility in Texas. Disappointed that he will not be joining the Joes, Sean receives a gift of a commando dagger from Snake Eyes before departing. He also receives kisses from Scarlett and Cover Girl, much to Clutch's chagrin. However, the orders turn out to be false, as the C-130 transporting Sean lands at the Pit III instead, and he is indeed assigned to the Joes. Roadblock gives Sean a new code name, Throwdown.

Throwdown's first mission with the Joes is to infiltrate a Revanche Robotics facility in the fictional country of Olliestan. However, during this mission, the team including Throwdown runs afoul of the Red Shadows working with Cobra on a giant robot, intended to be the Black Major's ultimate weapon. During the fighting, Throwdown's shirt is torn, revealing an Arashikage tattoo that indicates he has trained with the ninja clan. Meanwhile, the Joes back at the Pit have been attempting to use a revived Serpentor to gain access to secrets in the greater secret underground base to which the Pit was constructed adjacently. Having lost control of Serpentor, he deploys the base's own secret weapon - another giant robot - and sends it to Olliestan, where it destroys the Red Shadows' robot. Throwdown, disguised as a Toxo-Viper, infiltrates the robot controlled by Serpentor, and rides it back to Utah. However, the robot is not shielded against atmospheric reentry, and Sean's helmet catches fire, causing severe burns to his face. As the robot returns to the Pit, Snake Eyes sacrifices himself to put an end to Serpentor. Emerging from the robot, the still-smoldering Throwdown puts on Snake Eyes' discarded mask.

Sean's vocal chords are revealed to have been destroyed, and while he is recovering in the Pit's sick bay, Hawk offers him the opportunity to assume the Snake Eyes identity, in order to have Cobra continue believing the original is still alive. However, as a result, Sgt. Sean Collins is declared dead and buried in Arlington National Cemetery with full honors, although the Joes are not present at the sham funeral. This does have the side-effect of Cobra recognizing the former Fred II, Wade Collins, at Sean's funeral, and Firefly is sent to destroy the Collins' home. Meanwhile, Night Creepers are sent to Snake Eyes' cabin in the High Sierras. Sean, as Snake Eyes, succeeds in fighting off the Night Creepers with Scarlett's help, and uses the lone surviving Night Creeper to infiltrate Cobra's Silent Castle in Trans-Carpathia to send Cobra Commander a message that Snake Eyes could get to him at any time. Meanwhile, the rest of the Collins family escapes Firefly's attack thanks to Wade having an escape plan, and Wade correctly deduces that his adopted son is still alive.

As Snake Eyes, Sean is sent back to Fort Wadsworth along with Scarlett. From there, he is sent to infiltrate Storm Shadow's secret water tower lair in Manhattan, where he is reunited with the former Cobra ninja, who previously trained him.

== Animated series ==
=== Valor vs. Venom ===
G.I. Joe: Valor vs. Venom marks Kamakura's first appearance in animated form. Here he is seen as an apprentice to Snake Eyes with Jinx. He struggles to use his new sword throughout much of the movie, but by the end finally masters it. The sword is said to possess mystical properties and that it can only be drawn in order to help others.

=== Ninja Battles ===
In the direct to video animated feature G.I. Joe: Ninja Battles, Jinx and Kamakura assists Snake Eyes, Duke, and new apprentice Tiger Claw, in a battle against Storm Shadow and Cobra ninjas Slice, Slash, and Shadow Strike, at the forge of Arashikage Clan swordsmith Iron Master.

=== Sigma Six ===
Kamakura again makes his appearance as part of the G.I. Joe team in the Sigma 6 toy series. As of August 2008, he has had two 8" Sigma Six Commando Scale Figures. A major difference between his Sigma 6 and his previous releases is that the top of his face is uncovered for these figures. Kamakura has short brown hair and brown eyes.

Kamakura is a ninja and a reservist member of the Sigma 6 team. In this series, both Jinx and Kamakura serve as Snake Eyes' apprentices. He is seen in several episodes in which he is still training as a ninja under Snake Eyes and is on the team during a battle between Snake Eyes and Storm Shadow. He is later injured and not seen active again until the second season. He was last seen as part of the team Firefly captured and later rescued by Duke as of the last airing of Season 2.

== Video games ==
Kamakura appears as a playable character in the video game G.I. Joe: The Rise of Cobra.
