= G.I. Joe: Ninja Battles =

2004 animated film

- Directed by: Arthur Nichols
- Written by: Garfield Reeves-Stevens; Judith Reeves-Stevens
- Produced by: Daley Miller
- Edited by: Tim Archer
- Production company: Reel FX
- Release date: September 15, 2004
- Running time: 22 min.
- Country: United States
- Language: English

G.I. Joe: Ninja Battles is a 2004 American animated military science fiction action short film. The film was released on DVD as part of the Ninja Battles set of G.I. Joe: A Real American Hero figures. In it, the history of the Arashikage Clan, as well as the history of Snake Eyes and Storm Shadow's rivalry, are examined through a series of trials. Scenes from both G.I. Joe: Spy Troops and G.I. Joe: Valor vs. Venom are used, with a brief period of new animation at the end of the movie.

== Plot ==
Narrated by the Iron Master, the story takes place in the Iron Master's forge. Tiger Claw has just earned his name, and so Iron Master explains how the war between the Arashikage Clan and the Red Ninjas began, by telling the origin of the rivalry between Snake Eyes and Storm Shadow. The story is told in flashbacks, to the first time that Snake Eyes and Storm Shadow faced off against each other, when the Hard Master put them through four trials. The trials end with Storm Shadow joining Cobra, blaming Snake Eyes for the demise of his family.

Duke, who had been standing in the shadows with Snake Eyes during the Iron Master's story, steps forward to tell Tiger Claw that someday Storm Shadow will learn the truth about his family, and be welcomed back into the Arashikage Clan, and to join the G.I. Joe team. Storm Shadow then appears to challenge Snake Eyes and Tiger Claw, who reveal that Kamakura and Jinx are there to back them up. Storm Shadow then reveals allies of his own, in the form of Slash, Slice, and Shadow Strike. The ninjas all battle in Iron Master's forge, until the villains finally escape. Duke then offers Tiger Claw membership in the G.I. Joe Team, and he accepts.

== The four trials ==
=== Mizu ===
"Mizu" - The Trial of Water: Water is considered to be "shifting, formless, taking the shape of whatever confines it". The trial is designed to test a ninja's understanding and mastery of strategy. Hard Master gives each ninja a bowl of water, and each must get the other's bowl without taking it from the other's hand. Tiger Claw realizes that the strategy is cooperation, so that both may complete the task, by giving their bowl to the other. Instead, Storm Shadow chose to take the water bowl from Snake Eyes by tripping him, which was considered an act of weakness by the Hard Master.

=== Tsuchi ===
"Tsuchi" - The Trial of Earth: Earth is considered to be "solid and supportive, resisting change, but giving strength". The trial is designed to test a ninja's use and understanding of force alone. Snake Eyes and Storm Shadow stand atop wooden poles, and Snake Eyes is the first to realize "to defeat your enemy in battle, first defeat the battleground". He causes Storm Shadow to fall first, who turns in anger to consult the ninja named Shadow Strike, not knowing that Shadow Strike has been watching the trials as a Cobra spy.

=== Kaze ===
"Kaze" - The Trial of Wind: Wind is considered to be "forceful or subtle, striking from all directions, but always unseen". The trial is designed to test a ninja's understanding and mastery of bladed weapons. Snake Eyes and Storm Shadow face each other with swords on a rope bridge. At one point, a rope is cut and Storm Shadow loses his sword, as he almost falls over the edge. Snake Eyes reaches to help him up, but Storm Shadow throws a shuriken at him, which causes Snake Eyes to fall off the bridge. Storm Shadow wins, but the Hard Master shows his disapproval by breaking Storm Shadow's sword, which further angers Storm Shadow. In this continuity, it is revealed that Hard Master is considered to be Storm Shadow's father.

=== Hi ===
"Hi" - The Trial of Fire: Fire is considered to be "a force of creation when used wisely, but a force of destruction when unleashed". The trial is designed to test a ninja's senses, and demonstrate understanding and mastery of fire in all its forms. For this trial, Snake Eyes and Storm Shadow descend to a dungeon filled with mirrors. They are each given a laser pistol to use as a tool, but are expected to use their senses to determine what is real and what is illusion. While they are fighting, Shadow Strike uses this opportunity to signal Cobra Commander, who also arrives at the dungeon. Not knowing that others are there, Hard Master is shot by Cobra Commander and killed. Storm Shadow believes that it is Snake Eyes who shot the Hard Master, and so he leaves to join Cobra, convinced that Snake Eyes has betrayed the Arashikage Clan.

== Cast ==
- Tiger Claw - Brian Drummond
- Iron Master - John Novak
- Storm Shadow - Ty Olsson
- Duke - John Payne
- Jinx - Venus Terzo
- Kamakura - Kevan Ohtsji

== DVD ==
There is a variation in the DVD case - it was available either as a standard DVD case, or as a cardboard box. Extras included are a Spy Troops trailer, a Valor vs Venom trailer, and a Valor vs Venom music video.

== Toys ==
The Ninja Battles set included a Battle Arch, a Valor vs. Venom comic, and the DVD, along with a 5-pack of figures (Storm Shadow, Tiger Claw, Snake Eyes, Shadow Strike, and Black Dragon Ninja). The Black Dragon Ninja does not appear on the DVD, but does appear in the comic book, which has a plot completely different from the DVD.
