= Chuckles (G.I. Joe) =

Character from G.I. Joe

- G.I. Joe character
- First appearance: G.I. Joe issue #60 (June 1987)

In-universe information
- Affiliation: G.I. Joe
- Specialty: Undercover
- File name: Provost, Philip M.
- Birth place: Little Rock, Arkansas
- Rank: E-5 (Sergeant)
- Primary MOS: Criminal Investigations
- Secondary MOS: Intelligence

Chuckles is a fictional character from the G.I. Joe: A Real American Hero toyline, comic books and animated series. He is the G.I. Joe Team's undercover specialist and debuted in 1987.

== Profile ==
His real name is Philip M. Provost, and his rank is that of sergeant E-5. Chuckles was born in Little Rock, Arkansas.

Chuckles's primary MOS is criminal investigations, and his secondary is intelligence. His first exposure to "hole-and-corner" operations was working for Southeastern Insurance Group in Fort Lauderdale, he then eventually made his way to the US Army's Criminal Investigations Division before joining G.I. Joe. He is known for being conscientious about maintaining his "cover" to the point that he volunteers to go on missions no one else will accept.

Chuckles is naturally likable, which has made him well suited for undercover operations. His gregarious nature also helps him to earn the trust of his marks, so that they have no idea that he is actually spying on them. Chuckles does this not for any accolades or recognition, for there is no record on file crediting him with the information he provides. He is aware of the consequences of being found out, but he is also confident in his ability to talk his way out of any situation.

== Toyline ==
Chuckles first appeared as an action figure in 1987. He was released as part of the "Operation: Flaming MOTH" set of exclusives sold by the G.I. Joe Collector's Club in 2006, representing the first figure sold of the character in nineteen years; his filecard hinted that he is an expert at faking his own death, a nod to his demise in the Devil's Due G.I. Joe Vol. 2 comic series that was ultimately deemed uncanonical following the expiration of Devil's Due's license with Hasbro in 2008.

A new mold of the character appeared in the 25th-anniversary line as a part of Hasbro's 2007 "Assault on Cobra Island" seven-figure pack, and was featured in a two-pack (with series newcomer Freestyle) that was released as a 2013 G.I. Joe Convention exclusive.

== Comics ==
=== Marvel Comics ===
In the Marvel Comics G.I. Joe series, he first appeared in issue #60 (June 1987). As part of a misunderstanding, he arrests the Joe team leader Hawk. It is soon learned that Chuckles, along with Fast Draw, Lt. Falcon and Law and Order were told they were now members of G.I. Joe, without anyone telling the actual G.I. Joe team. The Dreadnoks soon attack, as part of a plan to neutralize a missile aimed at Cobra Island. Thanks to the "new" Joes' assistance, Hawk makes them all official members. Chuckles did not gain full security clearance just yet, and as such almost caused an incident when he arrived at the Joes' Utah base. He was not allowed to know about the USS Defiant, yet managed to uncover many clues to its existence.

Chuckles leads a Joe team consisting of Iceberg, Scarlett and Snake Eyes into the fictional country of Chomo-Lungma. They are sent with a C.I.A. officer to retrieve another agent. The Joes end up helping the local resistance fight against invading Chinese forces. Chuckles spends the next three months fleeing with his team, his pick-up being delayed due to ambushes. As one last team comes for a third and final attempt, Chuckles' squad gets involved with a local conflict yet again but are safely rescued. The Joes that pick up Chuckles and his team have their own difficulties, as detailed in the next issue.

Chuckles assists Destro, Billy (the son of Cobra Commander), and Zartan in escaping from an attack by Cobra-allied Night Creepers. He then joins up with the Joe Ninja Force, and with the assistance of Wild Bill, everyone raids the Night Creeper Headquarters. They successfully help Destro gain back the Baroness, and remove the Cobra bounty from his head.

=== Devil's Due ===
As revealed in the Devil's Due series, Chuckles spends four years infiltrating Extensive Enterprises, the Cobra front headed up by Tomax and Xamot. Known terrorist Tyler Wingfield steals a mobile biological weapons platform. Duke believes he can use this opportunity to bring Chuckles back in. His cover morphs into others believing he is a genuine traitor, and he ends up in a little-known federal prison. In a scheme to get Chuckles away from Cobra attention, Blowtorch and Gung-Ho help stage an undercover operation. The two, disguised as prison guards, "kill" Chuckles and escort him to a safe house. Cobra, however, had their own agent in the prison, allowing a raid on the safe house. Chuckles ends up with Tyler Wingfield. He and an innocent airplane pilot are held hostage. This is resolved only when Tyler's mother assaults her son, sending them both plunging to an apparent death.

In the 'Declassified' three parter, set during the Joes' early years, Chuckles is seen as an operative of a 'rival' intelligence agency to the Joe team. During this time, he claims to have personally witnessed the incident that Hawk was court-martialed for; accepting responsibility for his men torturing a prisoner that led to saving innocent lives.

Chuckles is one of the many Joes who assaults Cobra Island, when Serpentor and his "Coil" army take over and cause the second Cobra civil war. Chuckles and Duke fight Serpentor's ally Overlord hand to hand on the beach, where Chuckles is impaled and killed. He is one of multiple G.I. Joe fatalities. His name is part of a memorial to fallen Joes located in Arlington.

=== IDW Publishing ===
Hawk assigns Chuckles to deep cover in an attempt to learn more about Cobra. To this end, he became the Joes' undercover contact, with his only contact being Jinx. However, Cobra knew his identity from the start, and Chuckles was manipulated by Tomax and Xamot to become isolated and depressed. He meets Cobra Commander, who reveals the charade, and is invited to join Cobra. Chuckles agrees, and uses the opportunity to get closer to the Commander. When he gets the chance, he kills the Commander and detonates a nuclear bomb on one of Cobra's main installations, killing himself and Xamot in the process.

== Novels ==
Chuckles appeared in three of the six G.I. Joe tie-in novels published by Ballantine Books in 1988, as a featured character in Divide and Conquer by Margot Becker and Jungle Raid by R. L. Stine, and in a supporting role in The Sultan's Secret by Peter Lerangis. He is erroneously mentioned on the back cover of Fool's Gold by S.M. Ballard, as he does not appear in the book.

== Animated series ==
=== G.I. Joe: The Movie ===
Chuckles is a supporting character in the 1987 Sunbow/Marvel animated film G.I. Joe: The Movie. He is part of a group of new Joe recruits called the Rawhides. He has no dialogue and no mention is made of his occupation. He instead performs feats of physical strength such as manually hurling a H.A.V.O.C missile to destroy a H.I.S.S. tank during a training exercise, then jumpstarting a hotwired Tomahawk helicopter by manually spinning the rotors and taking out three Dreadnoks with a single punch as Flint and the recruits work to rescue a group of Joes imprisoned in Cobra-La.

== Film ==
In August 2019, Paramount announced a G.I. Joe spinoff film with Chuckles as the only named character. G.I. Joe: Ever Vigilant writers Josh Appelbaum and André Nemec were hired to work on the script.
