= Night Creepers =

G.I. Joe characters

Night Creeper
- G.I. Joe character
- Illustration of Night Creepers from G.I. Joe: Battle Files #2
- First appearance: 1990

In-universe information
- Affiliation: Cobra
- Specialty: Cobra Ninja
- File name: Unknown
- Subgroups: Ninja Force

The Night Creepers are fictional characters from the G.I. Joe: A Real American Hero toyline, comic books and animated series. They are a syndicate of hi-tech ninjas/corporate mercenaries hired by Cobra as spies and assassins.

== Profile ==
The Night Creepers are Swiss bankers who have been highly trained in martial arts, and equipped with cutting-edge technology. These "corporate ninja" mercenaries handles Cobra's bankroll, as well as the organization's most dangerous assassination missions. Unlike the Arashikage clan, Night Creepers would prefer a laser-cut carbon-fiber-composite weapon, to an ancient 13th century blade. They are not united by blood or history, they are only interested in progress and profit.

Led by a mysterious man known as Aleph, the Night Creeper Leader contracts their services out to criminal organizations, or individuals who can meet his excessive fee. While Cobra was temporarily dissolved, the Night Creepers offered their services for other highly paid ventures, such as assassinating CEOs of corporations, and assisting in hostile takeovers.

== Toys ==
- Night Creeper - The Night Creeper was first released as an action figure in 1990. A Ninja Force version was released in 1993, and recolored as part of the "Shadow Ninja" line in 1994.
- Night Creeper Leader - The Night Creeper Leader is the leader of the high-tech ninjas. He is believed to conduct all field and covert operations for Cobra. Night Creeper Leader was first released as an action figure in 1993, as part of the "Battle Corps" line. This figure was recolored, and released again in 1994.

== Comics ==
=== Marvel Comics ===
In the Marvel Comics G.I. Joe series, the Night Creepers first appear in issue #107. They contract their services to Cobra Commander, who gives them their first assignment: kill the former Cobra ninja Storm Shadow. They almost succeed, until Storm Shadow is confronted by Scarlett, and the two of them disappear beneath a subway train.

They become a recurring enemy of the Ninja Force. When Ninja Force goes to Beirut, Lebanon, to help the arms dealer Destro, the Night Creepers are involved in a Joe/Cobra fight against Ninja Force and the "Sky Commandos". Their headquarters is then raided, when Destro allies himself with Chuckles, Wild Bill, Billy and Zartan. Destro uses the Night Creepers' resources to gain back the Baroness, by wiping out Cobra bank accounts. To save his fortunes, Cobra Commander agrees to return the Baroness to him, and remove the Cobra bounty from Destro's head.

They later appear in issue #135, when attacking the scientific facility of Doctor Biggles-Jones. All inside, with the exception of the Doctor, are killed. She and her rail gun are taken. The Doctor protests the Creepers slaying her personal assistant, a balding older man, but they do anyway. In the next issue, they once again encounter Storm Shadow and the Ninja Force.

The Night Creeper Leader appears in issue #141. He battles Snake Eyes one-on-one, until Snake Eyes uses the Arashikage Mind Set to distract the Night Creeper Leader, and then easily defeats him.

=== Devil's Due ===
The Night Creepers appear in Vol. 2 of G.I. Joe: Master & Apprentice.

They assist Tomax in freeing Major Bludd and several other prisoners from "The Coffin", while killing others who Cobra Commander considered "loose ends".

The Night Creepers later appeared in the first issue of the Devil's Due Storm Shadow series, working with Crystal Ball, when their business conflicts with the ninja's efforts.

Aleph, the former leader of the Night Creepers, becomes Incision, and joins Cobra's Plague Troopers during "World War III". A highly skilled, arrogant assassin, he serves in the Plague for money, and protection from the Night Creepers. In America's Elite #35, Storm Shadow kills Incision in battle in the Amazon.

== Animated series ==
=== DiC ===
The Night Creepers appeared in the DiC G.I. Joe animated series, most prominently in the episode "Night of the Creepers".

The Night Creeper Leader also appeared in the series, voiced by Andrew Koenig in season one and by Maurice LaMarche in season two. He works with ninjas Slice and Dice.
