= Doctor Venom =

Dr. Venom
- G.I. Joe character
- First appearance: 1983
- Voiced by: Michael Emerson

In-universe information
- Affiliation: Cobra
- Specialty: Scientist
- File name: Dr. Archibald "Venom" Monev

Dr. Venom (Doctor Venom; also Dr. Archibald "Venom" Monev, or simply Venom Monev) is a fictional character who appears in the Marvel G.I. Joe comic series. He is a scientist who is the inventor of the Brainwave Scanner.

== Comics ==
=== Marvel Comics ===
Dr. Venom is the first scientist employed by Cobra. His first major invention for the organization is the Brainwave Scanner. He gets a chance to show off the evil device when the Baroness captures Snake Eyes, Scarlett, and Zap and brings them to Cobra headquarters in Springfield. Dr Venom tries to break through Snake Eyes' resistance and manages to see flashes of several of the Joe's memories including his time in Vietnam and the mission that scarred his face. When Venom is distracted by Scarlett and Zap's attempts to escape, Snake Eyes uses breathing techniques he learned in Japan to simulate his death. When Venom and a guard unstrap Snake Eyes from the scanner, the Joe revives and knocks both of them out. He then meets up with his friends and the trio escape.

Dr. Venom begins work on a plague toxin at a lab in Sierra Gordo. Snake Eyes, Stalker, Breaker and Gung-Ho track down the lab and almost capture Venom, but all four are captured instead by Kwinn the Eskimo. Venom beats Snake Eyes severely and leaves him to die in a burning warehouse as payback for what happened in Springfield. Snake Eyes escapes and tracks everyone to a meeting with the Baroness and Scar-Face on a small island. Baroness, Scar-Face, and the other three Joes escape the island while Snake Eyes, Kwinn, and Venom do battle. Kwinn notices Baroness divebombing the island and pushes the other two into an armored bunker. The island is then bombed out of existence.

The bunker survives the bombing and all three agree to work together to escape. However, Venom decides to doublecross Kwinn and knocks him over the head with a wrench while swimming to the surface. Venom and Snake Eyes run into a small force of Cobras who were dealing with the aftermath of the Sierra Gordo operation. The Cobras thought about taking the duo prisoner but were all killed when Kwinn turned up alive. The trio headed for a nearby airfield where they stole an old WW2 Lancaster bomber to fly back to the States. The trip was not uneventful as the Sierra Gordo military tried to shoot them down and Venom tried to kill Snake Eyes and Kwinn by having them fall out the bomb bay doors. The plane limped its way to Miami Beach where the trio were arrested. However, Venom had earlier used the plane's radio to transmit a message to Cobra in morse so he had a lawyer waiting for him at the station.

Venom gets back in Cobra Commander's good graces and uses the plague toxin in a plan to poison the US money supply. When the Joes thwart the scheme, Venom pilots a HISS Tank that takes himself, Cobra Commander, and Destro to safety. Venom later travels to Tripoli where he infects Scar-Face with the toxin. This is a part of a plan to have Scar-Face captured by the Joes so Cobra can track down where the Joes' secret base is by watching for signs of medical quarantine. While preparing for the battle to come, Venom is ambushed by Kwinn and Snake Eyes at his lab in Brooklyn. Unfortunately, the arrival of Cobra forces allows Venom to disable Kwinn and Snake Eyes and lock them up in SNAKE armor that brainwashed them into serving Cobra. During the attack on G.I. Joe base, Venom unleashes the SNAKE armor on the attacking Joes, but Snake Eyes breaks free from his brainwashing and frees Kwinn. Kwinn destroys Venom's HISS tank and prepares to kill Venom with a grenade. However, Kwinn finds he can't go through with his vengeance and instead decides to let Venom live. Venom is not impressed by the gesture and shoots Kwinn several times in the back. Kwinn appears to shrug off the shots and tells Venom he will not harm him as long as he lives. Moments later, Kwinn dies and the grenade he was holding rolls out of his hand and into Venom's feet. Venom is killed instantly by the blast ending the confrontation in a mutual kill. Venom is later buried in an unmarked grave in Potter's Field. Ironically, this same fate later befalls his successor Doctor Mindbender.

=== IDW ===
Twenty-six years later (May, 2010), in the Larry Hama-written G.I. Joe: A Real American Hero issue 155½, a Free Comic Book Day giveaway, Doctor Venom makes an appearance of sorts. Venom's image appears and persists on the screen of the Brainwave Scanner as Billy, Cobra Commander's son, is being subjected to a brainwave scan. Doctor Mindbender assures Cobra Commander that this is merely a glitch in the system. Mindbender is later seen discussing his concerns about the glitch to Destro and the comic ends alluding to the fact that readers have not seen the last of Doctor Venom's diabolical schemes.

Indeed, Venom has managed to transfer his mind and memories into Billy, suppressing Billy's own personality. He makes several overtures towards the Baroness under the cover of Billy's training sessions. When Snake Eyes is captured and brainwashed, he takes Snake Eyes to Brooklyn to eliminate the defected Storm Shadow. Storm Shadow manages to undo Snake Eyes' brainwashing, and the two of them manage to subdue Billy, having figured that Doctor Venom had taken over. They sneak back into Cobra's base and place Billy in the scanner, confronting Venom in Billy's mind. Entering the Scanner's shared mindspace, they defeat Venom and Billy and force Venom into his darker memories, where they find several ice floes and Kwinn waiting for him. Kwinn seizes Venom and carries him into his kayak, sailing off into the sunset.

In Issues 169, Doctor Mindbender is attempting to repair the Brainwave Scanner after the Ninjas sabotage it, when he sees Doctor Venom again, pleading with Mindbender to free him in exchange for his secrets. Mindbender refuses and destroys the Brainwave Scanner as Kwinn drags Venom away once more.

== Toys ==
Dr. Venom's action figure was first made in 2010 as part of a two-pack with Adventure Team Commander available from the Official G.I. Joe Collectors' Club.

== Animated series ==
Doctor Venom appears in the G.I. Joe: Renegades episode "The Anaconda Strain", voiced by Michael Emerson. Dr. Archibald Monev is a scientist for Cobra Industries who works with Dr. Kurt Schnurr on the Anaconda Strain virus. He secretly infects Dr. Schnurr so that he'd be out of the way when Cobra releases the Anaconda Strain onto the populace and distribute the antidotes. Following the intervention of the Joes, Dr. Venom manages to escape.
