= Falcon (G.I. Joe) =

Character from G.I. Joe

- G.I. Joe character
- Falcon as seen in G.I. Joe: The Movie.
- First appearance: G.I. Joe: A Real American Hero issue #60 (June 1987)
- Voiced by: Don Johnson (Movie); Scott McNeil (DiC); Scott Menville (Renegades)

In-universe information
- Affiliation: G.I. Joe
- Specialty: Special Forces
- File name: Falcone, Vincent R.
- Birth place: Fayetteville, NC
- SN: 035-38-2264
- Rank: O-2 (First Lieutenant); O-3 (Captain) (Devil's Due comics)
- Primary MOS: Infantry
- Secondary MOS: Medic
- Subgroups: Night Force; Super Sonic Fighters

Falcon (also known as Lieutenant Falcon) is a fictional character from the G.I. Joe: A Real American Hero toyline, comic books and animated series. He is a member of the Army Special Forces with the G.I. Joe Team and debuted in 1987.

== Profile ==
His real name is Vincent Falcone and his rank is first lieutenant (paygrade O-2). Falcon was born in Fayetteville, North Carolina.

As Special Forces, his primary function is special operations. His father was also.in Special Forces, who served with the 10th Special Forces Group as a command sergeant major. Falcon served with the 5th Special Forces Group's Blue Light counter-terrorist unit as an "A" Team executive officer prior to joining the G.I. Joe team. He has been cross-trained in demolitions, and is fluent in Spanish, French, Arabic, and Swahili. Falcon is also an expert with most NATO and Warsaw pact small arms. Falcon has an overwhelming friendliness, and can usually sway even the strongest isolationist into joining the fight. This excessive personality often leads to friction with his commanding officers.

=== Falcon and Duke ===
In the G.I. Joe animated continuity, Falcon is established to be the younger half brother of Duke (the characters are unrelated in the comics). This relation serves as one of the main focuses in G.I. Joe: The Movie, in which Falcon's irresponsible behavior causes Serpentor to escape captivity, which results in a hostility between himself and Duke when Duke is forced to use his influence to bail Falcon out of trouble.

In the G.I. Joe: Renegades cartoon, Falcon is homaged as Duke's younger brother.

== Toys ==
Falcon was first released as an action figure in 1987. It sports the familiar green beret headgear, and olive green fatigues with tiger stripes, and is armed with shotgun, knife, backpack and antenna. Two more versions came out, both made from repaints of the same original mold. The second is a Toys 'R' Us exclusive released in 1988, where he was renamed Lt. Falcon and packaged in a "Night Force" two-pack with Sneak Peek. It sports a black beret, black top fatigue with grey sleeves, brown pants and black boots. The third version was released in 1991, as part of the Super Sonic Fighters subset of the toyline. It sports a green beret again, and the fatigues have an urban design. The action figure carries a portable helicopter backpack that can emit four different sounds.

A fourth all-new sculpt Falcon figure was planned for release as part of the 4th wave of the G.I. Joe "Direct To Consumer"/Toys "R" Us line but was canceled along with the other figures in that wave. In 2009, this version was released by G.I. Joe Collectors' Club.

In 2008 Hasbro released a new sculpt of Falcon for its 25th anniversary line, in a two pack with Nemesis Immortal (originally Nemesis Enforcer). The figure pack also included an original comic, issue #8 titled Lt. Falcon vs. Nemesis Immortal: Showdown at the Top of the World, written by Larry Hama and featuring both characters. The story takes place in the Himalayas, the same location as G.I. Joe: The Movie. Lt. Falcon carries a wounded Dusty to their extraction site, concerned that Nemesis Immortal is still around. As the story continues, it focuses on Lt. Falcon battling Nemesis Immortal, so that the Joes can escape.

== Comics - original continuity ==
=== G.I. Joe: A Real American Hero - Marvel Comics ===
In the Marvel Comics G.I. Joe series, he first appeared in G.I. Joe: A Real American Hero #60 (June 1987). Falcon and several other soldiers are tricked into believing they are now part of the Joe team. They end up in a confrontation with General Hawk and the Dreadnoks. Ultimately it was all a plan to destroy Cobra Island with a giant missile; the weapon is destroyed. Due to his heroic actions, Falcon and the other soldiers are officially accepted into the Joe team. Later, he is involved in several major events in the comics. During the Cobra Civil War he is the leader of a recon team for the Joes. The team is responsible for many incidents, including securing the manned tower at the Cobra airfield. Falcon witnesses the death of most of the Oktober Guard. Falcon is also involved in deadly mission in the fictional country of Trucial Abysmia in which several Joes are killed by a Cobra S.A.W. Viper. Falcon and the survivors escape in a Cobra Rage tank. This vehicle is destroyed by Cobra forces, killing Breaker, Crazy-Legs and Quick-Kick. Duke, Cross-Country and Falcon are the only survivors. This is just prior to Cobra's invasion of another fictional country, Benzheen. Lt. Falcon left G.I. Joe after it was disbanded.

=== Reinstatement - Devil's Due Publishing ===
Before G.I. Joe was reinstated, Lt. Falcon has become a military consultant for various Hollywood productions. He would take part in missions if he was needed. He later got involved in the second major invasion of Cobra Island in G.I. Joe #25 (Devil's Due Productions). His last mission prior to a second disbandment of G.I. Joe was a recon mission in fictional Badhikstan. By rejoining the Joe Team Falcon received a pay raise to Captain (O-3).

=== America's Elite ===
Falcon became a reservist after Joe Colton reorganized the team. During the "World War III" storyline, he joined Vorona in teaming up with her old comrades in the Oktober Guard to battle Cobra in Chechnya and Russia.

== Animated series ==
=== G.I. Joe: The Movie ===
In animation, Lt. Falcon first appears in G.I. Joe: The Movie, voiced by Don Johnson. He is depicted as a member of the "Rawhides", a group of new Joe recruits, and is cocky and irresponsible. He avoids training, instead giving an unauthorized tour of the facility where Serpentor is being held to a woman named "Heather", who in reality is Zarana in disguise. Falcon is caught in the act by Duke, and is punished to keep watch on the outer perimeter of Serpentor's prison until Duke says otherwise. However, he deserts his post and flirts with fellow Rawhide Jinx, believing it impossible for the enemy to break Serpentor out. Falcon's neglect of his duties allows the Dreadnoks and Golobulus' minion Nemesis Enforcer to compromise G.I. Joe security and rescue Serpentor, critically injuring Joes Gung-Ho, Alpine and Bazooka in the process. General Hawk scolds him for his actions, has him confined to his quarters until the court-martial, and orders Low-Light and Scarlett to get him out of his sight.

At Falcon's court-martial, Hawk reads Lt. Falcon's charges that involved the mentioning of Cobra having made a new ally. Duke pleads in his defense to Hawk and those overseeing the court-martial while revealing that Falcon is his half-brother, though Falcon does not appreciate it. Rather than receiving a heavy sentence, Falcon is sentenced to the "Slaughterhouse" where he is put under the punishing training supervision of drill instructor Sgt. Slaughter and his "Renegades" Mercer, Red Dog, and Taurus. Falcon does managed to improve himself under their supervision as Duke checks in with them. Sgt. Slaughter, Falcon, and the Renegades are enlisted by Duke to do an unnamed infiltration of the Terror Drome. Falcon is briefly captured and interrogated, but is saved by the Renegades. He comes to the aid of the Joes in the battle for the Broadcast Energy Transmitter (B.E.T.), during which Duke is impaled by Serpentor while saving Falcon and falls into a coma.

After being consoled by Hawk, Falcon swears vengeance on Serpentor while the Joes prepare for their final assault on Cobra-La in the Himalayas. He is on guard in Joe headquarters with the rest of the Rawhides and contacts Flint. When Hawk's team is ambushed and captured by the traps in Cobra-La, Falcon and the recruits head to the Himalayas and help the Joes in battle. In the throne room, Falcon struggles with Serpentor and is nearly strangled, but a mutated Cobra Commander in the form of a snake saves him. Falcon defeats Serpentor by causing his cape to be caught in his air chariot's engine turbine. He then fights Golobulus, who overpowers him, but Falcon jabs Golobulus in the eye with the latter's stick, freeing himself. Falcon evades Golobulus and manages to deactivate the B.E.T. machine, but Cobra-La's spore pods have matured in space and released its mutative spores by then. However, Falcon reconfigures the B.E.T. to incinerate the spores before they reach Earth, causing it to overload as Golobulus gets away. Stuck on one end of an abyss, Falcon tells Jinx and Sgt. Slaughter to leave, but they save him in time before the B.E.T. destroys the spores and Cobra-La in an explosion. As the Joes celebrate their victory, Falcon shares a kiss with Jinx, and they watch the remaining mutation spores burning in orbit. Though Duke does not appear, Falcon thanks him for his success after the Joes are contacted that Duke has come out of his coma.

Lt. Falcon was originally meant to replace Duke's leadership role in the cartoon after Duke was killed protecting him from Serpentor, but that idea was scrapped due to the uproar of Optimus Prime's death in The Transformers: The Movie. Consequently, the two characters were identified in the movie as siblings. In earlier drafts, Lt. Falcon was penned as the son of General Hawk (hence the Avian-themed codenames).

=== DiC ===
Lt. Falcon appeared again in the G.I. Joe animated series produced by DiC, voiced by Scott McNeil. In the two-part episodes "Long Live Rock and Roll" and "The Greatest Evil", his portrayal is less flattering since the events of the movie as he succumbs to the drug Spark provided by the drug dealer Headman. Led by Duke and a vengeful Crimson Guard who has a drug-addicted sister, it took the combined forces of G.I. Joe and Cobra to defeat Headman's private army the Headhunters.

=== Renegades ===
In G.I. Joe: Renegades, Lt. Falcon is homaged as Duke's younger brother Vincent "Vince" Hauser. When Duke returns fearful for his family due to threats from Cobra, Vince warns Duke to stay away from him and their parents. Unlike his mother and eventually his father, Vince doesn't believe Duke is innocent and turns him and the Joes over to Flint when they come over to Duke's house for a rare home-cooked meal. Despite this, Duke defends his actions to his group due to his concern for the family.
