= List of Cobra (G.I. Joe) characters =

Cobra is the fictional nemesis of the G.I. Joe Team in the Hasbro toylines and related media. This is an alphabetical listing of Cobra members with unique identities as well as the members of its factions.

== Cobra ==
=== Alexander McCullen ===
Alexander McCullen is Destro's long-lost son in the Devil's Due Publishing continuity and member of the Iron Grenadiers. He posed as Destro when the real one was bed-ridden with an illness.

=== Bayonet ===
Bayonet is a Cobra Snow Serpent serving as part of the organization's elite Plague Troopers. He wears a portable life support system due to having survived injuries to his chest by the G.I. Joe team.

=== Big Boa ===
Big Boa is Cobra's trainer and was first released as an action figure in 1987. Big Boa is a brutal, unfeeling taskmaster who whips the unruly Cobra Troopers into shape, as these soldiers are not motivated by patriotism, unit loyalty, honor, or sense of duty. Cobra Troopers say he has a voice like a bullhorn, fists the size of frozen turkeys, and the disposition of a bear with a headache.

Big Boa appears in Devil's Due G.I. Joe series. He fights Bazooka, one of four Joes who had just discovered Cobra's influence in the small town of Delhi Hills. Bazooka defeats him in hand-to-hand combat, but Big Boa, like most signs of Cobra influence, is spirited away before the authorities arrive. He also makes an appearance in issue #24. Later, Big Boa is killed along with several Cobra troopers and South American operative Asa Negra in an attack by the Red Shadows.

Big Boa was featured in IDW Publishing's G.I. Joe: Cobra II.

Big Boa plays a supporting role in the second G.I. Joe novel Divide and Conquer. Along with Croc Master, he attempts to provide backup to Raptor. He also appears in the third G.I. Joe novel Fool's Gold, by S.M. Ballard. He decides to try and take over Cobra by use of a disintegration gun prototype; he is stopped by a bullet in the leg and the theft of the gun.

Big Boa was given a 25th Anniversary style figure by the G.I. Joe Collectors Club as part of their Figure Subscription Service.

=== Black Major ===
Black Major started out as a Special Action Force commander and tactician who was abducted by the Red Ninjas and brainwashed by their leader Baron Ironblood to serve them. When Baron Ironblood mysteriously disappeared, Black Major took the remaining Red Ninjas and sided with Cobra.

=== Black Out ===
Black Out is the code name of Thomas G. Stall. He is the brother of G.I. Joe members Barrel Roll and Bombstrike and was born in Cincinnati, Ohio. Black Out washed out as a candidate for the G.I. Joe Team when he failed his psychological exam. Angered that his brother was accepted, Black Out joined Cobra as a sniper. In addition, Black Out works with Firefly and Munitia as H.I.S.S. (Hierarchy of Infiltration, Stealth, and Sabotage).

Black Out was first released as an action figure in 2003, carded in a two-pack with Flint. In G.I. Joe: America's Elite, Black Out appears as a member of the elite Plague Troopers.

=== Body Bags ===
Body Bags is a member of Cobra's Plague Troopers. He was selected from the Range Vipers and has seamlessly fit into the unit.

=== Cesspool ===
Cesspool is the code name of Vincent D'Alleva. He was born in Newton, Massachusetts, and was first released as an action figure in 1991, as part of the Eco-Warriors line.

For a time, Cesspool was the Chief Executive Officer of a company with holdings in large number of oil refineries, mills and chemical plants. In an effort to placate environmentalists, he takes some on a personal tour of one of his holdings. He suffers an accident, dropping him into chemical sludge that scars the right side of his face and leaves him blind in his right eye. Cesspool comes to believe that environmentalists were the cause of his misfortune. He also wishes to make the world as 'ugly and deformed' as he is. To that end, he offers his services as a businessman to Cobra.

In the Marvel Comics G.I. Joe series, he first appeared in issue #123. Continuing in the next two issues, he and his men fight the G.I. Joe "Eco-Warriors" team, made up of Clean-Sweep, Ozone and Flint. The Joes drive Cesspool off of his "plasmatox" base on an abandoned oil drilling platform, ultimately using a U.S. government lawyer to inform Cesspool that his assets have been seized. Cesspool continues to work for Cobra, operating alongside Zarana. As revealed in issue #135, Zarana and her close ally Road Pig spent months as prisoners alongside Cesspool.

In the Devil's Due G.I. Joe series America's Elite, Cesspool moves into suburbia under witness protection. Scarlett stops by to grill him about suspected Cobra ties to the satellite bombing of Chicago. She finds Cesspool is dying of cancer due to past exposure to toxins. Guarding the sick Cesspool in his home is a younger woman claiming to be his wife and three robotic soldiers in the guise of children. They subdue and capture Scarlett. Sometime later, Cesspool is captured by the Joes and transferred to the Coffin prison. Cobra forces later invade the prison, freeing some while executing others considered to be "loose ends". Cesspool falls under the latter category.

Cesspool appears in the DiC G.I. Joe animated series, voiced by Terry Klassen.

Cesspool appears as a boss in 1992's G.I. Joe: The Atlantis Factor for the Nintendo Entertainment System.

In IDW Publishing's G.I. Joe continuity, he first appears in Infestation 2: G.I. Joe #1, as a crazed resident of the "Cobra-La" installation for unfit and unstable agents deemed valuable to Cobra R&D.

=== Cobra Letal ===
Cobra Letal is the leader of a South American unit of Frag-Vipers with a chess-based tactical efficiency.

=== Cobra Mortal ===
Cobra Mortal was first manufactured in Argentina in 1989 as part of Plastirama's 2nd series of "G.I.Joe Comandos Heroicos" line.

Cobra Mortal was released in the U.S. as an action figure as part of the 2006 Convention Set "Cobra's Most Wanted: Mercenaries". He served Cobra in South and Central America, before severing ties and becoming a mercenary, but still functions as a Cobra field operative.

Cobra Mortal appears in the Devil's Due series G.I. Joe: America's Elite, when the Joes start hunting down every member of Cobra that they can find during "World War III".

Cobra Mortal was released as an action figure as part of the 2006 G.I. Joe Convention Exclusives. While some of his history remains intact, his bio states that he is also a professional assassin and that he still functions as a Cobra field agent if the pay is right. His way of making a name for himself is planning to take down Sgt. Slaughter.

=== Coil Crusher ===
Coil Crusher debuted in the G.I. Joe: Valor vs. Venom line. Coil Crusher is was a Jungle-Viper who was spliced with the Venom formula and the DNA of a snake. This gave him scales, a pair of nictitating membranes across his eyes, and venom pouches in place of tonsils.

=== Crimson Asp ===
Crimson Asp, born Siobhan A. Nathair, is an elusive saboteur and mercenary for hire who lost her right eye in a disastrous mission in her home country of Ireland. Since that experience that gained her tactical experience, she works for anyone that would pay her with one notable client being Cobra Mortal.

=== Croc Master ===
There are two different characters named Croc Master:

==== First Croc Master ====
The first Croc Master is a former alligator wrestler and burglar alarm salesman who founded Guard-Gators Inc. in an effort to commercialize the use of alligators for home security. He later began to abundantly stock Cobra Island's maze-like system of shallow canals and interconnecting waterways, with ravenously hungry man-eating crocodiles, deliberately conditioning them to be hostile, psychotic and fast. He is Cobra's reptile trainer and also has a pet alligator. Croc Master was first released as an action figure in 1987.

==== Second Croc Master ====
The second Croc Master was released as part of the G.I. Joe: Valor vs. Venom line. This Croc Master is the successor of the original Croc Master, who died during the Cobra Civil War. He sports a modified open vest, a green facemask with tubes, and a distinct greenish skin tone from the "venomization" process implying that he might've been spliced with the Venom formula and the DNA of a crocodile.

=== Crystal Ball ===
Crystal Ball is Cobra's hypnotist and was first released as an action figure in 1987. He is the seventh son of a seventh son, born of a Romanian father (who supposedly had "second sight"), and an American mother from Bangor, Maine. Legend indicates seventh sons of seventh sons have telepathic powers. Whether this is true or not, Crystal Ball can reportedly sometimes read minds, and has been used as an interrogator of captured Joes.

Crystal Ball claims that the origins of his talents stem from the dark and mysterious power of the occult. Independent research by Psyche-Out uncovered another possible origin, tied to a theatrical hypnotist known as "Trance-Master", who operated as an encyclopedia salesman in Maine, before traveling abroad to gain new knowledge of hypnotic techniques. An unnatural spike in encyclopedia sales, combined with his sudden disappearance from the lecture circuit, corresponded with the appearance of Crystal Ball as part of Cobra. Whatever his true past, Crystal Ball has proven to be an effective Cobra agent, helping Doctor Mindbender to modify the Brainwave Scanner, and using his unusual talents to bend the will of Cobra prisoners.

In the Marvel Comics G.I. Joe series, he first appeared in G.I. Joe Special Missions #24. He assists Cobra in a failed attempt to kidnap the President of the United States from a baseball game. His skills allow them to pass through the Joe-provided security with minimal violence. His hypnosis of various people is undone by Cover Girl.

In the Devil's Due G.I. Joe series, Crystal Ball spends some time masquerading as Dr. Scott Stevens, who is a therapist working with General Philip Rey. He eventually reveals that General Rey is a clone of Serpentor, and is part of a larger conspiracy to interject General Rey into the G.I. Joe team. Crystal Ball uses post-hypnotic phrases to unlock Rey's mind and turn him into a fully functioning Cobra agent. But the plan backfires, and with Duke's help, General Rey is able to combat his initial programming and break free from Crystal Ball's control. Crystal Ball is then taken into G.I. Joe custody.

He later appears in the first issue of the Devil's Due Storm Shadow series. He is working with the Night Creepers, whose business conflicts with the ninja's efforts. He also appears in a dream sequence in a Devil's Due Special Missions one-shot.

Crystal Ball is a supporting character in the G.I. Joe novel Divide and Conquer. In it, he has telepathy, and is capable of projecting long-range illusions. The non-fiction book Haunted Heart: The Life and Times of Stephen King indicates that Stephen King's son, Owen, had a hand in creating the Crystal Ball character. The figure is mentioned by name in King's novel, The Tommyknockers.

=== Decimator ===
Decimator was first released as an action figure in 1990 as the driver of the Cobra "Hammerhead" vehicle.

Decimator has a knack for technology that involves hand-eye coordination. He wears a special helmet that gives a special view of the enemy target. The helmet gives excellent night vision ability and a 180° view. This technology enables him to keep the target in continuous view without having to turn his head around.

=== Dice ===
Dice is a Cobra ninja, and was first released as an action figure in 1992, as part of the Ninja Force line. Dice often works with Slice, another ninja.

In the Marvel Comics G.I. Joe series, he first appeared in issue #120. There he is summoned to Destro's castle in Trans-Carpathia. Dice becomes involved with the "Red Ninja" clan. Both Dice and Slice become mentally affected by the ninja Firefly, and work to free him from a predicament on Cobra Island. Dice appears in issue #138, working with various Cobra operatives, such as Dr. Biggles-Jones, to hunt down suspected Cobra traitors Destro and the Baroness. The latter two escape.

Dice appears in the DiC G.I. Joe animated series, voiced by Scott McNeil.

=== Doctor Biggles-Jones ===
Doctor Biggles-Jones is a fictional character from the G.I. Joe: A Real American Hero and Transformers Marvel Comics series.

Her first appearance is in G.I. Joe: A Real American Hero #135, when her scientific facility is attacked by the mercenary Night Creepers. She and her railgun are taken and except for the Doctor, all inside are killed. She then works closely with the seeming Joe traitor Scarlett in Destro's Trans-Carpathian castle. Biggles-Jones leads the hunt for Destro and the Baroness, who were hiding from Cobra Commander in the castle. She also teams up with the Cobra ninjas Slice and Dice.

After the alien robot Megatron shows up at the castle, he makes a deal with Cobra Commander to trade Cybertronian technology, for a re-designed body and the railgun taken by Cobra. Biggles-Jones designs Megatron's shoulder-mounted electromagnetic railgun and other enhancements, including his new tank-based alternate mode. Biggles-Jones however cares about the welfare of the recently injured Scarlett, knowing her to be an undercover agent for G.I. Joe. As such, she becomes uncomfortable with Cobra Commander's deal with the powerful Megatron. Cobra betrays Biggles-Jones and offers her to Megatron as part of the deal. Megatron arranges to freeze her brain for transport to Cybertron, but Scarlett, paying back a debt for Biggles-Jones saving her life, confronts Megatron to save her. Scarlett's bold challenge allows a squad of Autobots to intercept Megatron and free Biggles-Jones.

In G.I. Joe Special Missions: Antarctica, Dr. Biggles-Jones is mentioned to have been found in a Cobra medical facility. She is listed in G.I. Joe: America's Elite as terminated by Cobra during a raid on "The Coffin", G.I. Joe's maximum security prison.

=== Gallows ===
Gallows is a former Cobra Saw Viper who was promoted to the elite Plague Troopers. He is able to fire with a marksman's accuracy and reload very quickly. Gallows was released as an action figure in 2006, as part of the "Plague Troopers vs Steel Brigade" set.

=== Ghost Bear ===
Ghost Bear is the code name of Jesse Kwinn Jr. and is the son of Tracker Kwinn. He was released as an action figure in 2004, packaged with the Cobra Pulverizer battle suit, as part of the Valor vs Venom line.

Ghost Bear was born in an Inuit village on the Russian side of the Bering Strait. He has learned how to hunt and track in the most unforgiving environment on Earth. When his father Tracker Kwinn ended up in a mutual kill with Doctor Venom during a mission with G.I. Joe, Ghost Bear joined up with the Cobra Organization, where he developed a grudge against the G.I. Joe Team, including Snake Eyes.

He appeared in the Devil's Due series G.I. Joe: America's Elite, when the Joes start hunting down every member of Cobra that they can find during "World War III".

=== Grim Skull ===
Grim Skull is a former Sand Viper who was promoted to the elite Plague Troopers. He successfully completed a mission to bring back an experimental mutagen after the lab techs escaped with their research and materials by mutating his own men to earn the promotion. Grim Skull was released as an action figure in 2006, as part of the "Plague Troopers vs Steel Brigade" set.

=== Gristle ===
Gristle is the code name of Danimal J. Rogers, and he is Cobra's urban crime commander. His birthplace is Montego Bay, Jamaica, and he was first released as an action figure in 1993, as part of the Battle Corps line. In Brazil he is released as 'Vandalo'.

Gristle is noted for having little sense of personal hygiene, and the sunglasses he wears to cover his blood-shot eyes. He spent months training to join the group known as the "Headhunters". He also spent time as the "right hand man" to crime lords, who operated illegal warehouses disguised as legit comedy clubs. Gristle allied himself with Cobra after starting his own gang. He has self-confessed to feeling "crazy" when pursued by G.I. Joe.

Gristle appears in the DiC G.I. Joe animated series, voiced by Garry Chalk.

In IDW Publishing's G.I. Joe continuity, he first appears in Infestation 2: G.I. Joe #1, as a crazed resident of the "Cobra-La" installation for unfit and unstable agents deemed valuable to Cobra R&D.

=== Guillotine ===
Guillotine is a former Navy SEAL who defected to Cobra because he felt the SEALs were not ruthless enough. He became a Cobra Eel, quickly rising in rank due to his ruthlessness. Cobra Commander personally selected him to lead the elite Plague Troopers. He designed the Plague training program and selected the unit's members. Guillotine was released as an action figure in 2006, as part of the "Plague Troopers vs Steel Brigade" set.

=== Hannibal ===
Hannibal was released as an action figure in 2006, as part of a comic book 3-pack, along with Agent Courtney Krieger and Spirit Iron-Knife.

Hannibal first appeared in the Devil's Due G.I. Joe series, and is named for the Carthaginian general of the same name who fought Rome in the Second Punic War. He is also a clone of Serpentor who was created by Doctor Mindbender and aged a few years. As a teenager, Hannibal escaped his foster family to reunite the other Serpentor clones that were younger than him and reunited with Doctor Mindbender. He served in the Coil under Serpentor until being taken into custody after their defeat. He now serves as a general in Cobra, seeking to help Cobra Commander conquer the world. Hannibal is willing to sacrifice his own men to win a battle.

=== Headman ===
Headman is a drug kingpin who leads a criminal organization known as the Head Hunters. He was first released as an action figure in 1992, as part of the DEF (Drug Enforcement Force) line. A repaint of this figure was released in 2002 as a two-pack with General Tomahawk as part of the G.I. Joe vs. Cobra series. This second version of Headman was also released as a bonus figure with the Duke vs. Cobra Commander two-pack as part of a K-Mart exclusive.

Headman began his criminal career mugging old women for their Social Security checks. He moved on to robbing convenience stores. While in prison, he learned the basics of drug dealing. He created a drug empire based on paramilitary standards. There is strict discipline and a respected chain of command. This has proven successful; much of his competition has fallen by the wayside. He later moves much wider profit possibilities; he is known for stealing weapon plans and price art treasures.

In the Marvel Comics G.I. Joe series, he appears in issue #123. His drug peddling forces come into conflict with the Joes' "Drug Enforcement Force", which includes Bullet-Proof, Mutt, and Shockwave. Headman had brought drugs into the Cobra-controlled town of Broca Beach. He also must deal with a suburban housewife out to kill him. Without realizing the nature of the town they were fighting for, the Joes drove out Headman and his forces.

He appears the Devil's Due comics in Special Missions: Brazil, where he is captured by the Joes. He ends up a prison in the "Coffin", a high-security G.I. Joe operated prison in the country of Greenland. Tomax, a Cobra operative, invades the prison to rescue his brother and takes the opportunity to kill many 'loose' ends. Headman is one of the many fatalities; Dr. Biggles-Jones and Monkeywrench are also killed.

In IDW Publishing's G.I. Joe continuity, he first appears (in the second ongoing G.I. Joe: Cobra series) as a right-hand man to Major Bludd, who is known and feared for decapitating his foes. His character and appearance are a departure from the drug lord image from his action figure and past comic book appearances.

Headman appears in the DiC G.I. Joe animated series, voiced by Scott McNeil.

=== Hotwire ===
Hotwire is a Cobra scientist and mechanic who specializes in robotics.

Hotwire was an unnamed man who intended to break with family tradition of being mad scientists, but was kicked out of school for cybernetic experiments. Cobra recruited him to optimize their B.A.T.s (short for Battle Android Troopers) and serve as the B.A.T. mechanic. He sees himself as a pure scientist and is oblivious to his own insanity where Doctor Mindbender knows and relishes how evil he is. Hotwire once older B.A.T. units at the time when he was loaned to the newly-reformed Headhunters.

=== Incision ===
Incision, formerly Aleph, is the former leader of the Night Creepers and currently serves as a member of Cobra's Plague Troopers. A highly skilled, arrogant assassin, he serves in the Plague for money, and protection from the Night Creepers. In America's Elite #35, Storm Shadow kills Incision in battle in the Amazon.

=== Infrared ===
Infrared is a member of the elite Cobra Crimson Guard Immortal and is a member of the elite Cobra Plague Troopers.

=== Interrogator ===
Interrogator was first released as an action figure in 1991, as part of the Battle Copters line. He was also in 2006 as part of the DTC line. In 2010 he was a part of an exclusive set of figures released by the G.I. Joe Collectors Club at their annual convention.

Interrogator was used in the Devil's Due line of G.I. Joe comics. In his first appearance in Special Missions: the Enemy, Interrogator takes part in a raid on a hospital to kidnap the child of Destro and the Baroness. This mission was a test to see if he and the others with him were worthy of joining the new elite squad known as The Plague.

Later, he kidnapped Duke and his father Max Hauser during a family visit in St. Louis. He disguises himself as an Army officer and tries to persuade Max that his son has gone AWOL and is looking for asylum. Before he can successfully deceive the elder Hauser and further torture Duke with sedatives, Roadblock comes to their rescue and the Interrogator flees. He lashes out before escaping and shoots Max Hauser, but it is barely a wound and he survives.

During the "World War III" storyline, Interrogator and the other members of the Plague served on several missions around the world in eliminating various opposition to Cobra including a battle with the Joes in the Mid East and fighting resistance in Philadelphia. He eventually takes part in the final battle between Joe and Cobra in a hidden base in the Appalachian Mountains. During the battle he is knocked out by a punch to the face delivered by Duke.

Interrogator also appears in the series "Hearts and Minds" in issue #3 by IDW. Interrogator proves his skills at getting information by questioning Thomas Stall. He uses Stall's shame at being a called a coward because of a false video tape showing him running from his fellow soldiers.

Interrogator appeared in the DiC G.I. Joe animated series.

=== Lightning ===
Lightning (his Portuguese name is Relâmpo) is a Python Patrol boat captain who started out a stunt motorcycle with the need for speed. While having been rejected by the G.I. Joe Team for his recklessness, he joined up with Cobra where he became part of the Python Patrol and piloted their Water Moccasin.

=== Lt. Clay Moore ===
Lt. Clayton W. Moore is a former street gang member who joined Cobra and his leadership skills enabled him to become a garrison officer at Cobra Headquarters. He even managed to prove himself to Cobra Commander when he managed to ferret out a "traitor" in their ranks. Cobra Commander rewarded Lt. Clay Moore with the command of the elite Cobra Shock Viper corps.

=== Munitia ===
Munitia is an unnamed female mercenary, and anyone that gets close to her gets a chill to their bone. She is often found in the company of Black Out and Firefly, known together as H.I.S.S. (Hierarchy of Infiltration, Stealth, and Sabotage).

Munitia was released as an action figure in 2009, as an exclusive with the G.I. Joe Collectors' Club.

In G.I. Joe: America's Elite, she served as a member of the elite Plague Troopers.

=== Neurotoxin ===
Neurotoxin is the leader of the Cobra Sand Scorpion forces, and was first released as an action figure in 2004 as part of the G.I. Joe: Valor vs. Venom line. Like all of the Sand Scorpion troops, Neurotoxin was hand-picked from the Cobra Sand Vipers to have his DNA combined with the Venom formula and the DNA of a scorpion to produce a more effective warrior.

Neurotoxin appears in the Devil's Due book Special Missions Manhattan. He is captured by the Joes and later sent to the Coffin prison in Greenland. Neurotoxin is among the prisoners freed by Tomax and later battles the Joes in Mexico.

=== Night Adder ===
Night Adder is a security officer for Cobra who owns a trained attack dog and uses a ruthless enforcement approach that strikes fear into his fellow officers and unlucky intruders.

=== Overlord ===
Overlord is the code name of Mikhail Derenko. He was first released as an action figure in 1990, packaged with the "Dictator" attack tank/hovercraft. He is suspected of being a former Crimson Guard member. Regardless, he actually managed to take control of Cobra for some time. He advocated 'traditional Cobra values' but this was just to mask his own personal grab for power.

Overlord appears in the Devil's Due G.I. Joe series. He is responsible for the death of Chuckles, murdering him on the beach of Cobra Island in issue #25. Moments later, Skidmark and Duke move in to arrest Overlord, but a helicopter crashes between them, killing Skidmark and allowing Overlord to escape. He later goes to work for the Jugglers, who send him to Duke's secret base in Iceland. There he mortally wounds Scanner, and locks Duke, Scarlett, and Snake Eyes in a vault. Scanner uses the last of his strength to activate the base's self-destruct, killing himself and Overlord.

Overlord appears as a boss in the 1991 G.I. Joe video game for the Nintendo Entertainment System.

=== Raptor ===
Raptor is Cobra's falconer and was first released as an action figure in 1987.

Raptor was a yuppie tax consultant who took up falconry as a pastime. He became obsessed with the avian bloodsport, and discovered that by breeding bigger and stronger birds, and equipping them with steel-tipped talons, they were capable of attacking much more profitable game. After Destro caught him poaching on a Cobra mink ranch, Raptor joined the Cobra legions, and began work on developing a bird of prey strong enough to attack a G.I. Joe. Raptor has an unmistakable kinship with his feathered minions, and has even taken to dressing like a giant bird, in order to put his birds at ease. He supplements his income in the service of Cobra, by training his falcons to steal jewels and other valuables.

In the Marvel Comics G.I. Joe series, he first appeared in issue #59. He teams up with Cobra Commander, to attack a small group of Joes on the move after weapons testing. This group includes Tunnel Rat, who Raptor had traced through his credit cards. Raptor then tails Cobra Commander's son Billy, gaining more valuable intelligence.

Raptor was one of the few members of Cobra, who knew that Fred VII had replaced the original Cobra Commander. He divulged this information to Dr. Mindbender, bringing the Cobra scientist to the Commander's supposed burial site. There they discovered an empty grave, and that Cobra Commander was still alive. Cobra Commander returns to Cobra Island, and buries Raptor with several of his other enemies in a landlocked freighter on the island. Raptor does not survive this incident, dying from botulism after eating tainted food.

Raptor appears in the G.I. Joe novel Divide and Conquer. He also appeared in the 1991 G.I. Joe video game for the Nintendo Entertainment System.

In IDW Publishing's G.I. Joe continuity, he first appears in Infestation 2: G.I. Joe #1, as a crazed resident of the "Cobra-La" installation for unfit and unstable agents deemed valuable to Cobra R&D.

=== Razorclaw ===
Razorclaw is the leader of the Cobra Razor Troopers and was first released as an action figure in 2004 as part of the G.I. Joe: Valor vs. Venom line, in a two-pack with Heavy Duty.

Razorclaw does not know the name he had before his transformation into a Cobra Feral Berserker. After the procedure, he had the urge to rip anything in front of him. Razorclaw was trained by renegade ninjas in vicious and sneaky tactics that have been outlawed by various ninja clans for hundreds of years. Razorclaw is simply unleashed to let the tiger DNA part of him take over to stalk and capture his prey by taking them down with his retractable claws.

In IDW Publishing's G.I. Joe continuity, he first appears in Infestation 2: G.I. Joe #1, as a crazed resident of the "Cobra-La" installation for unfit and unstable agents deemed valuable to Cobra R&D.

=== Red Ninja Leader ===
The Red Ninja Leader is the leader of the Red Ninjas. He and his Red Ninjas consider themselves the best ninjas and are determined to defeat Snake Eyes. Though the Cobra Red Ninja Leader and his Red Ninjas work for Cobra, they will also sell their services to the highest bidder should one come into view.

=== Repulsor ===
Repulsor is the code name of Frederick M. Townsend. Repulsor served as Cobra's Toxo-Viper commander, and was first released as an action figure in 2014 as a G.I. Joe Convention Exclusive.

=== Rip It ===
Rip It is the code name of Fredd T. Booth III. Rip It served as the commander of Cobra's H.I.S.S. tank division, and was first released as an action figure in 2000, packaged with the H.I.S.S. III. A version of the H.I.S.S. Commander was also released in 2007 and 2008.

He appears in the Devil's Due G.I. Joe comics, in the one-shot Special Missions: The Enemy. He takes part in a raid on a hospital to kidnap Baroness's baby. After expressing doubts about the mission, Rip It is killed by his superiors.

=== Scalpel ===
Scalpel is the code name of Andrew R. Walker. He is a doctor who joined up with the Cobra Organization as a Cobra Medic and was first released as an action figure in 2003, in a 2-pack with G.I. Joe member Sgt. Hacker. Scalpel also has a grudge against Sgt. Hacker for reasons that he does not want to reveal.

=== Scar-Face ===
Scar-Face is a Cobra Officer, who was a courier for Cobra Commander in the Marvel Comics G.I. Joe series. He was eventually used as a "biological time-bomb", in order to infect the G.I. Joe Team with a deadly toxin invented by Doctor Venom. Scar-Face was killed, when explosive charges destroyed G.I. Joe headquarters and he was trapped inside.

Scar-Face was released as an action figure in 2008 as "Scarred Cobra Officer", in a comic book 2-pack as part of the 25th Anniversary line.

=== Shadow Strike ===
Shadow Strike was a ninja who infiltrated the Arashikage Clan to corrupt it from within, while secretly working for Cobra Commander. He continues his training under Storm Shadow, but also spies on him for Cobra Commander. His greatest strength is also his greatest weakness, as he is a lone wolf, preferring to operate alone as opposed to teaming with another or using troops.

Shadow Strike makes a non-speaking appearance in the film G.I. Joe: Ninja Battles.

=== Shadow Tracker ===
Shadow Tracker is Cobra's wilderness hunter/guide who uses traditional weapons from around the world. He uses primal instincts to track his prey by hearing whispers in the jungle, distant footprints in the Earth, and taste his victim's fear in the wind.

=== Skull Buster ===
Skull Buster is Cobra's Range-Viper commander. He worked up the ranks of Cobra's Range Vipers, by being the most vicious of the bunch. Skull Buster has embraced the life of a survivalist, handling inhospitable wilderness with zeal, and cheerfully feasting on any animal worth killing. He imagines himself as the ultimate alpha predator, and is more likely to kill a scavenger such as a vulture or jackal, before dining on carrion.

During "World War III", when G.I. Joe was actively pursuing all known Cobra operatives, Skull Buster had made his home on a deserted island in the wilds of Namibia. When Shipwreck and Cover Girl show up to apprehend him, he decides to kill them by faking their deaths from exposure; simple murder would cause too much of an investigation and disrupt his "retirement". Shipwreck stuns the man with scorpion venom, and he is taken back to civilization, a fate he fears worse than death. Skull Buster is incarcerated in "The Coffin", a prison in Greenland created by G.I. Joe to hold all of their captured enemies. He is eventually freed alongside several others, during an assault on The Coffin led by Tomax.

=== Sky Creeper ===
Sky Creeper was first released as an action figure in 1991, as part of the Air Commandos line. He is the Cobra Air Recon Leader.

The criminal known as Sky Creeper created a glider to break out of reform school. He then had a career robbing patrons of rooftop restaurants and escaping via gliders. In prison, he is recruited to the side of Cobra by a member of the biker gang Dreadnoks. He then organized the "Night Vultures", a covert air recon unit, which he commands.

He appears in the Devil's Due G.I. Joe comics, in the one-shot Special Missions: The Enemy. He takes part in a raid on a hospital to kidnap Baroness's baby. After expressing doubts about the mission, Sky Creeper is killed by his superiors.

=== Slash ===
Slash is a mercenary/ninja serving in Cobra and was released in 2005. He wields twin dao broadswords. Slash was exiled by his clan for numerous crimes. He is described as a lethal warrior with a mantis-like grace and a complete lack of humanity. Slash frequently partners with Slice to form a two-person strike team.

Slash makes a non-speaking appearance in the film G.I. Joe: Ninja Battles.

=== Slice ===
Slice is a Cobra ninja who often works alongside Dice. The two debuted in the Marvel Comics G.I. Joe series.

Slice is believed to be a renegade ninja from the Arashikage clan. He is considered Cobra's supreme swordsman. He doesn't know the more silent and subtle ways of the ninja, but he compensates for it with raw strength. His sword attack copies the attack patterns of the scorpions. He is seen, normally, wearing an uwagi bearing Cobra's emblem over ninja garbs, and he prefers driving the vehicle called "Cobra Parasite".

Slice appears in the DiC G.I. Joe animated series, voiced by Scott McNeil.

Slice appears in the movie G.I. Joe: Valor vs. Venom, voiced by Kevan Ohtsji, with a different appearance, and accompanied by a ninja named Slash. Each ninja behaves very politely with his partner, in a humorous way. Slice and Slash are first seen taking a G.I. Joe base and are briefly incapacitated by Tunnel Rat. Later they capture Tunnel Rat and guard him while he is waiting to be killed by the rain bomb when Snake Eyes, Jinx, and Kamakura arrive and defeat Slash and Slice.

Slice and Slash also appear in the short film G.I. Joe: Ninja Battles taking place in the same continuity helping Storm Shadow attack the Joes along with Cobra's other ninja members. The ninjas are eventually driven off by Snake Eyes, Jinx, and Tiger Claw.

=== Steel Cobra ===
Steel Cobra (his Portuguese name is Cobra de Aço) is one of the most feared operatives of Cobra Command. He is a calculated strategist who is incredibly conceited about his success. Steel Cobra supervises Cobra's Python Patrol facility in the Brazilian Amazon as he is the only one who can handle the unforgiving Amazon rainforest. In addition, he also has some bad blood with Lt. Clay Moore.

=== Tomax and Xamot ===
Tomax and Xamot Paoli are psychic twin brothers who lead the Crimson Guard. They debuted in 1985.

The Paoli brothers are originally from Corsica. The brothers were at some point members of the Unione Corse (Corsican Brotherhood), served in the French Foreign Legion's 1^{er}REP in Algeria, then as mercenaries in Africa (Congo, southern Africa) and South America. While they relished this, they realized they would soon become too old and weak to be soldiers forever, so they changed careers and studied banking in Zurich, Switzerland. Unhappy with the world of corporate finance, the brothers found the opportunities available in international terrorism far more suited to their abilities, and joined Cobra. Their specialties are in infiltration, espionage (military and industrial), sabotage, propaganda, and corporate law. Like the Crimson Guard that they lead, Xamot and Tomax also lead the "respectable" corporate face of Cobra as the founders, owners, and CEOs of Extensive Enterprises. When not engaged in terrorism, they efficiently manage Cobra's business affairs in shirt and tie. Their preferred mode of attack is through brains over brawn, using the law to serve the purposes of Cobra. They have covered their paper trail and connection to Cobra so well, that it is thought to be impossible to prove a connection between them and the terrorist organization. The twin brothers are mirror images of each other; Tomax's hair is parted on the right side of his head and Xamot's on the left; the piping on their uniforms goes up the opposite side on each twin; the brothers' names are mirror images of one another. The only distinguishing mark between the two is a scar on Xamot's right cheek. Tomax and Xamot share an empathic connection commonly known as "The Corsican Syndrome" in which identical twins are believed to be psychically bonded, in a manner similar to The Corsican Brothers (1844) by Alexandre Dumas, père. While this psychic connection is often useful, as it allows them to communicate wordlessly, finish each other's sentences, and speak in unison, it is also a liability as they feel each other's pain.

In the Devil's Due Publishing series, the Twins fall under the influence of Destro's son, who has infected them with multi-function nanites. Their businesses still continue, such as working with Ripper to promote his soda company. After the nanite threat is neutralized, the twins activate Crimson Guardsmen in order to provide support to the now-free Cobra Commander. They continue to broker most deals for Cobra. The twins lead the unsuccessful hunt for the Cobra Island Joe infiltrator, "Barrel Roll", and were in charge of the secret construction of Monolith Base in Badhikstan, but after G.I. Joe raided the base, they fled with Cobra Commander to a cave. There, Red Shadows agent Dela Eden arrived and unleashed gunfire on the group. In the G.I. Joe Special Missions: Antarctica one-shot, a Joe team broke up an illegal oil drilling operation that was run by Tomax, who was able to escape. During the story, Xamot was strangely absent. In one scene Tomax talked to his brother as if he were present, despite the scene showing an empty chair. The whereabouts of Xamot were revealed in another story in the same issue, when G.I. Joe raided a Cobra medical facility and found Xamot, in a coma and unresponsive (presumably from the Red Shadows attack). Xamot is then held in G.I. Joe custody, still in a coma. Some months later, Tomax leads a raid on "The Coffin", a G.I. Joe maximum-security prison located in Greenland, to rescue his brother and free other Cobra operatives. He successfully frees his brother and several other Cobra agents. Off panel, the invading Cobra forces cause the death of 'loose ends' held at the Coffin, including Cobra operatives Monkeywrench and Dr. Biggles-Jones. Tomax and Xamot are captured by the Joes in the final battle with Cobra.

In the IDW Publishing continuity, Tomax and Xamot are revealed to be French and originally part of the Unione Corse. They set up their security company Extensive Enterprises, which was co-opted by Cobra; while Tomax enjoys being part of Cobra, he is unaware Xamot has become disgruntled and no longer trusts his brother. Xamot is badly beaten by Chuckles, who then self-destructs a nuclear missile payload on board a Cobra submarine, sacrificing himself and Xamot in the process. Tomax survives. Tomax eventually cuts a deal with G.I. Joe, offering to use his resources through Extensive Enterprises, to help the group find members of Cobra for captured. As part of the deal, Tomax was allowed to operate a casino in Las Vegas to create a cover that he was still involved in criminal activities, under the watchful eyes of Flint.

Tomax and Xamot appear in G.I. Joe (1983), respectively voiced by Corey Burton and Michael Bell. They appear as the commanders of the Crimson Guard, as well as the heads of Extensive Enterprises. Unlike the comics, the twins in the cartoon were often cagey, self-interested, and eager to seize power for themselves, although they garner little support from other Cobra members and their attempts are usually quashed by Cobra Commander.

Tomax and Xamot appear in G.I. Joe: Renegades, both voiced by Stephen Stanton. Tomax and Xamot dub themselves as the "Brothers of Light" due to their psychic abilities to manipulate others into do their bidding when standing together. Their psychic link is strong to the point of empathy: if one is in pain, the other feels it. Tomax and Xamot use their powers to "fleece" believers whom they brainwash into their cult with a machine that enhances their psychic abilities, planning on expanding their cult worldwide.

=== Tombstone ===
Tombstone is a mysterious high-ranking Cobra operative who strikes fear in his enemies by combining strong leadership skills and cunning psychological manipulation where he finds his equal in Duke.

== Trigger ==
Trigger (his Portuguese name is Gatilho) is a Python Patrol sniper who grew up playing video games and considered himself the "animal of the arcade" where he gained some expert reflexes. Upon joining the Pythom Patrol, he became the gunner for the Water Moccasin working under Lightning.

=== Vanguard ===
Vanguard, real name Army 2nd. Lt. Nick Bailey, is a member of Cobra's Plague Troopers. His parents worked hard to support him and his brother, who was killed in the Black Hawk down incident, which changed his worldview to a more radical position. He was personally recruited and influenced by Cobra Commander himself.

=== Vapor ===
Vapor was first released as an action figure in 1990, packaged with the Cobra Hurricane V.T.O.L. The pilot, whose name is unknown, has direct connections between his optic nerves and his plane's targeting computers. This allows data to be directly broadcast to the inside of his helmet. This system is also linked to voice-activated weaponry. This increases his piloting skills but after about half an hour, the image processing gives him debilitating headaches and vision problems.

Vapor and the Hurricane appeared in the DiC G.I. Joe animated series. He appeared in the episode "Messenger from The Deep"

=== Vector ===
Vector is a Cobra Laser Viper serving with the organization's elite Plague Troopers. He was recruited to the Plague due to his modifying his equipment from a targeting system to an offensive laser weapon system. It is rumored Destro tried to recruit him or purchase his technology for M.A.R.S.

=== Velocity ===
Velocity is an A.V.A.C. who serves as a member of Cobra's Plague Troopers. He is equipped with a personal jetpack system. He climbed the ranks to become an A.V.A.C. and earn the right to pilot a Firebat, becoming the best pilot in Cobra, second only to Wild Weasel. He is well liked by the rest of Plague due to his friendly personality and sense of humor.

At the end of the World War III story arc, he attempts to flee before the final battle, but is shot down and killed by Black Out on Guillotine's orders.

=== Venomous Maximus ===
Venomous Maximus was first released as an action figure in 2004 as part of the G.I. Joe: Valor vs. Venom line. Cobra forces captured General Hawk and Cobra Commander had Doctor Mindbender mutate him into the leader of Cobra's V-Troopers by splicing him with V-Trooper DNA and the DNA from a variety of apex predators. He is very powerful, difficult to control, and possesses a reptilian focus, an insect drive, and a mammalian bloodlust.

In the IDW Publishing comic miniseries G.I. Joe: Cobra, a different version of Venomous Maximus is seen. This version is depicted as a scarred and fanatical member of the Coil who is loyal to Serpentor. Venomous Maximus serves as the guard to the cell of Scoop and assists in his brainwashing. In addition, he also recounts helping to bring Croc Master and others into the Coil.

=== Vypra ===
Vypra is a ninja who is the code-name of Ann A. Conda (a play on "anaconda"). She grew up in the swamps of New Orleans before joining up with the Cobra Organization's Ninja Strike Team. Vypra is the driver of the Rattler 4-WD.

She is mentioned in the Devil's Due series G.I. Joe: America's Elite, when the Joes start hunting down every member of Cobra that they can find during "World War III".

=== Wild Weasel ===
Wild Weasel is an ace pilot, who served in the bush wars of South America and Africa. He has extensive knowledge of close support aircraft, ranging from jury-rigged civilian conversions, to state-of-the-art flying machines armed with laser-guided missiles and ECM pods. His speech pattern contains a characteristic sibilance that is caused by a mouth injury. He wears a red flight suit with a helmet that hides his face.

Wild Weasel appears in the G.I. Joe animated series, voiced by Pat Fraley. He had a rivalry with the Skystriker pilot "Ace".

Wild Weasel appears in G.I. Joe: Valor vs. Venom, voiced by Trevor Devall. He is among the fighter pilots who attack a G.I. Joe base. Kamakura decapitates his B.A.T. copilot, causing Wild Weasel's plane to crash.

=== Vance Wingfield ===
Vance Wingfield was the leader of the Strike First militia group, which was based in Montana. An undercover operation by G.I. Joe revealed it to be a Cobra training facility, where Wingfield was plotting to detonate a nuclear warhead on Russian soil, in order to initiate World War III. This plan was thwarted by G.I. Joe, and Wingfield was presumed dead, when he was shot in the back by his wife Shary.

Later, Wingfield's son Tyler tried to follow in his footsteps, by hatching a similar plot, and attempting to spread the lethal Death Angel virus. Tyler was also stopped by G.I. Joe, and history repeated itself, as he was also shot in the back by Shary Wingfield. Vance returned soon after, using M.A.R.S. technology to pull satellites from orbit, and collide them with cities on Earth. He was stopped when taken into custody by G.I. Joe, but not before causing devastation and killing thousands of innocent civilians in Chicago and Silicon Valley.

=== Wraith ===
Wraith is the code name of Charles Halifax. He was first released as an action figure in 2008, which was available in two different variations, the standard version, and a translucent blue version demonstrating his invisibility field.

Wraith is a mercenary who uses a stealth assault suit acquired through stolen technology. The suit allows him to become difficult to see, although an outline may be visible when he moves at high speed.

In the Devil's Due continuity, both G.I. Joe and Cobra hoped that the spy and fighter would choose to join them, but in the end, Destro was the only one who discovered what Halifax truly lived for: chaos and destruction. Destro offered Halifax a chance to become near-invincible with a stolen stealth assault suit acquired from the Chinese government. The power and opportunities provided by this suit were enough to buy Halifax's loyalty...for now. Wraith was killed by the Baroness, in her mission of revenge on all that had wronged her in the past. The Wraith suit then fell into the hands of the Red Shadows, reportedly the suit's original designers.

== Black Dragon ==
The following are members of the Black Dragon organization:

=== Black Dragon Leader ===
The Black Dragon Leader (also called Black Dragon) is the leader of the Black Dragon organization. Back when the original Black Dragon organization was wiped out by the original G.I. Joe Team, one unidentified survivor went on to rebuild the organization and become its leader. Afterwards, the Black Dragon Leader allied his organization with Cobra as well as planning his revenge on the G.I. Joe Team.

=== Black Dragon Ninjas ===
The Black Dragon Ninjas work for the Black Dragon organization when it allied with Cobra. While Cobra Commander had Doctor Mindbender brainwash the ninjas to be loyal to Cobra Commander, Storm Shadow secretly did an Arashikage trick that enabled them to be secretly loyal to him.

=== Black Dragon Troopers ===
The Black Dragon Troopers work for the Black Dragon organization when it allied with Cobra. They serve as master spies who are recruited in secret and are experts in armed combat and using explosives. The Black Dragon Troopers will complete their missions at all costs.

== Cobra-La ==
The following are members of Cobra-La:

=== Golobulus ===
Golobulus is the genocidal ruler of Cobra-La. Described as the "last of the Serpent Kings", he appears as a large bald humanoid with a serpentine lower body and his right eye either covered or replaced by some form of invertebrate/plant hybrid. Golobulus' left arm and much of his torso are covered with armor similar to that of crustaceans. His primary form of transportation, a large, organic pod with several tendrils, hides his lower body most of the time.

Golobulus appears in the crossover series G.I Joe vs the Transformers as the leader of Cobra-La. After summoning the Dark God Unicron to cleanse Earth, Golobulus intends to sacrifice Firewall to celebrate Unicron's coming. However, the ceremony is interrupted by Joe Colton, Hawk, and Optimus Prime, with Optimus Prime crushing Golobulus.

In the IDW Publishing comics, Cobra's religious wing Coil worships Gol Lobulas, a celestial serpentine being that brings order. Gol Lobulas once ruled a great paradise called Cobra-La, but human arrogance and ignorance forced Gol Lobulas underground and ruined humanity with disharmony and individuality. However, champions of the Serpent have arisen to try and reverse this. Serpentor, touched by Gol Lobulas himself, combines traits from past champions.

Golobulus appears in G.I. Joe: The Movie, voiced by Burgess Meredith. This version is the founder of Cobra.

Golobulus also appeared as one of the "bosses" in the G.I. Joe video game by Taxan for the Nintendo Entertainment System.

=== Nemesis Enforcer ===
Nemesis Enforcer is the commander of the Cobra-La Royal Guards. The towering guardian is mute, but he is able to make other sounds. His bat-like wings are used for flight, deflection and combat. He also exhibits superhuman strength and scythe-like blades, continuing on his forearm and protruding above his elbows. Very few men are able to match his strength which makes him a fearsome warrior. Golobulus is rumored to have raised Nemesis Enforcer from a pile of dead things, leaving an empty space where his soul should be.

Nemesis Enforcer appears in G.I. Joe: The Movie with his vocal effects provided by Peter Cullen.

=== Pythona ===
Pythona is a formidable femme fatale herald/assassin with poisonous claws who is rarely seen, but is known to be very deadly. She serves as the royal messenger of Golobulus and is known for her stealth. It is rumored that her abilities come from bio-genetic manipulation.

Pythona's action figure didn't come out until 2016 as part of the 2016 G.I.Joe Convention Exclusives.

She is voiced by Jennifer Darling in G.I. Joe: The Movie.

=== Royal Guards ===
The Royal Guards are the arthropod-themed foot soldiers of Cobra-La. According to their file card, the Royal Guards were Cobra-La citizens who had living insect bodyparts permanently bonded onto their bodies because their brains were lobotomized in order to ensure their complete loyalty to Golobulus.

== Dreadnoks ==
The following are members of the Dreadnoks biker gang:

=== Burn Out ===
Burn Out is a member of the Dreadnoks who is an expert mechanic and a master of disguise.

=== Buzzer ===
Buzzer is a chainsaw-wielding member of the Dreadnoks. Born in Cambridge, he traveled to Australia to research biker gangs and ended up joining the Dreadnoks.

=== Crusher ===
Crusher is a member of the Dreadnoks. He was a professional wrestler who was kicked out for his unscrupulous actions. Since then, he has wrestled alligators and operated as a poacher in the swamps before being discovered by the Dreadnoks and beat each of its members in wrestling except for Road Pig enough to join up with them. Though his poaching talent has made him a rival of fellow Dreadnoks member Gnawgahyde who is also a poacher. There was a claim that Crusher caused a disappearance of Gnawgahyde during a hunting trip.

=== Demolisher ===
Demolisher is an Aboriginal Canadian member of the Dreadnoks who wears an eyepatch over his right eye. He is a demolition enthusiast who joined the Dreadnoks after running out of things to demolish in his stomping grounds.

=== Dreadheads ===
The Dreadheads are six identical cousins who are members of the Dreadnoks. They have a grudge against Beach-Head and sided with the Dreadnoks in order to get their revenge on him during the fights against G.I. Joe.

==== Dreadhead Billy-Bob ====
Dreadhead Billy-Bob is the most handsome of the Dreadheads who is an expert con artist. While he has used his talents on Zarana, it did not go well with Road Pig.

==== Dreadhead Cletus ====
Dreadhead Cletus is the strong and silent of the Dreadheads who is an expert hunter and trapper.

==== Dreadhead Joe-Bob ====
Dreadhead Joe-Bob is a neighborhood bully who comes from a wealthy family that kept him from being sent to prison.

==== Dreadhead Otis ====
Dreadhead Otis is the oldest of the Dreadheads who comes from a wealthy family that runs the firearms manufacturing business.

==== Dreadhead Roscoe ====
Dreadhead Roscoe is a Dreadhead who is not treated well by the other Dreadheads and is used by the Dreadnoks to polish their arsenal.

==== Dreadhead Vance ====
Dreadhead Vance is considered by the Dreadnoks to be their "right-hand maniac" due to ill-mannered, self-destructive, and out of control personality. He is the only Dreadhead to not have a personal grudge against Beach-Head.

=== Machete ===
Machete is a member of the Dreadnoks who first appears in the G.I. Joe: Sigma 6 series. He carries a shotgun and drives the Dreadnok Cycle with Buzzer as his gunner.

=== Monkeywrench ===
Monkeywrench is a member of the Dreadnoks who loves explosions, going so far as to include fireworks and Roman candles in his bombs for effect. He uses grenades and bombs, as well as a harpoon gun.

=== Ripper ===
Ripper is a founding member of the Dreadnoks. He is known for carrying an assault rifle with a large blade serving as a bayonet.

=== Road Pig ===
Road Pig is a violent and dangerous enforcer of the Dreadnoks with a split personality and an attraction to Zarana. His weapons of choice are a cinder block attached to a metal pipe (which he uses as an improvised sledgehammer) and a wrist-mounted mini crossbow. He is identifiable by his massive size and white hair styled in a crew cut.

=== Storm Rider ===
Storm Rider is a member of the Dreadnoks. He makes customizable motorcycles and is an expert at hand-to-hand combat.

=== Thrasher ===
Thrasher is a member of the Dreadnoks and the driver of the Thunder Machine who grew up in a middle-class neighborhood. Thrasher was spoiled as a child by his middle-class parents, who never disciplined him in fear that this would "stifle energies he might need later in life". His parents never denied him what he wanted, even when those things caused destruction or disaster. After his parents were crippled in a car wreck, which may or may not have had anything to do with Thrasher's repair work on their brakes, Thrasher wandered into the swamps where to do whatever he wanted. There, he met Zartan and the Dreadnoks, who welcomed him in as one of them.

In the IDW Publishing comics, Thrasher is younger in this continuity. He is a stable technological genius, maintaining a Dreadnok camp deep in the Australian outback. He is loyal to Zartan to the point of betraying other Dreadnoks. However, Zartan betrays him as soon as it is beneficial.

Thrasher appears in G.I. Joe (1983), voiced by Ted Schwartz.

=== Zanya ===
Zanya is a member of the Dreadnoks and the daughter of Zartan.

== Iron Grenadiers ==
The following are members of Destro's Iron Grenadiers:

=== Darklon ===
Darklon is a distant cousin of the Destro clan and ruler of Darklonia. He briefly led the Iron Grenadiers when Destro retired from frontline conflict. Thought killed when Cobra Commander expanded operations into Eastern Europe and launched a missile that destroyed Darklon's castle, he actually escaped the blast and was alive and well until captured by the G.I. Joe team in the continued G.I. Joe: A Real American Hero issue #171 by IDW publishing.

=== General Mayhem ===
General Mayhem is a former Spetsnaz general who went AWOL. Returned as General Mayhem and Destro's new general of the Iron Grenadiers. His plans may seem chaotic and unorganized, but they usually come together to ensure victory.

A rumor that General Iron Bear and General Mayhem are one and the same was dispelled by David S. Lane under his alias "Commander Lane" on the official GI. Joe Club Forum. "I need to weigh in, since my name is erroneously included in that wiki entry. I want to clarify that whom ever posted those entries added false information. The Oktober Guard Leader: General Iron Bear and the Iron Grenadiers Infantry Commander: General Mayhem are not the same character.

=== Metal-Head ===
Metal-Head is an anti-tank specialist and member of the Iron Grenadiers.

=== Mistress Armada ===
Mistress Armada is the real name of Lilian Osborne, a former member of the British Army who sided with the Iron Grenadiers upon befriending Alexander McCullen in the Devil's Due Publishing continuity. First appearance in Image Comics G.I. Joe #1 (September 2001).

=== Roddy Piper ===
"Rowdy" Roddy Piper is a fellow Destro Clan member who serves as a trainer for the Iron Grenadiers. He is modeled after the professional wrestler Roddy Piper.

=== Sergeant Major Duncan ===
Sergent Major Duncan is the real name of Alastair Thomas Duncan, Destro's right-hand man on the Iron Grenadiers.

=== Undertow Officer ===
Undertow Officer (real name Anzinza Solarin) was a naturally skilled swimmer who was later stripped of her trophies when it was found out that her trainers have been using performance-enhancing chemicals on her during the Olympics. This led to her joining Destro's Iron Grenadiers where she rose to the ranks of the Undertows and puts them through the same training that she went through.

=== Voltar ===
Voltar was a successful mercenary commander that grew too successful for his continued presence to be tolerated by the provisional governments, revolutionary councils, and military dictatorships that employed him. He is affiliated with the Iron Grenadiers as Destro's general and debuted as a toy in 1988.

=== Annihilators ===
The Annihilators are elite troopers of the Iron Grenadiers. These troops use special helicopter backpacks and serve as Destro's personal guard.

=== Ferrets ===
The Ferrets are operators of the D.E.M.O.N. tanks.

=== Iron Anvils ===
The Iron Anvils are paratroopers who wear heavy armor and are dropped from low-flying planes.

=== Iron Grenadier Soldiers ===
The Iron Grenadier Soldiers are the basic infantrymen of the Iron Grenadiers that are sent into hot spots to cause conflict and sell weapons. They have been described as "used car salesmen with machine guns."

=== Nullifiers ===
The Nullifiers are pilots of the A.G.P. (Anti-Gravity Pod) flight vehicle. Nullifiers are trained and conditioned to be big and bulky.

=== T.A.R.G.A.T.s ===
The T.A.R.G.A.T.s (short for Trans-Atmospheric Rapid Global Assault Troopers) are soldiers in this unit that are sent into near sub-orbit and then deployed to battlefields.

=== Undertows ===
The Undertows are underwater combat specialists that trained and equipped to function in polluted waters near industrial and military sites.

The Undertows appear in the DiC G.I. Joe cartoon without their pet barracudas (the barracudas were only ever included with the figures).

== Lunartix Empire ==
The following are members of the Lunartix Empire:

=== Carcass ===
Carcass is an alien destroyer and mercenary of the Lunartix Empire with boneless alien arms and sharp teeth who is allied with Cobra. He was born on the planet Mirtonia.

=== Lobotomaxx ===
Lobotomaxx is a four-legged alien explorer and bounty hunter of the Lunartix Empire who is allied with Cobra. He sports bulging eyeballs, an exposed brain as a result of an earlir duel with Predacon, a bounty hunter battle suit, and a powerful tail. Lobotomaxx comes from the planet Zog.

=== Predacon ===
Predacon is a four-armed alien bounty hunter of the Lunartix Empire who is allied with Cobra. He comes from the plant Trilenium.

=== Manimals ===
The Manimals are shapeshifting members of the Lunartix Empire.

There were action figures that were planned for them in the "Star Brigade" line that did not get realized. KB Toys did release recolored versions of its three members.

==== Iguanus ====
Iguanus is a Manimal bounty hunter and member of the Lunartix Empire who can assume an alligator-headed reptilian form.

==== Slythor ====
Slythor is a Manimal bounty hunter/mercenary and member of the Lunartix Empire that can assume a snake/lizard-like form.

==== Spasma ====
Spasma is a bloodthirsty Manimal warrior who holds a grudge against Earth after Duke thwarted him in demolishing an asteroid belt. He can assumed a fanged alien form.

==== Vortex ====
Vortex is a Manimal bounty hunter who hatched in the star systems that are west of the G-2 galaxy. He can split open his head and torso to reveal a four-armed alien pilot inside.

==== Warwolf ====
Warwolf is a Manimal bounty hunter/mercenary/arms dealer and member of the Lunartix Empire who can assume a ferocious crocodile/wolf-like form with a hinged jaw and protruding tongue. He has poor vision is also known to eat anything.

==== Zigzag ====
Zigzag is a Manimal predator with bad body order. He has one humanoid helmeted head and one snarling head can each pop up in place of the other head.

== See also ==
- List of G.I. Joe: A Real American Hero characters
- Cobra Troopers – The common soldiers in Cobra Command
- B.A.T. – The robotic soldiers of Cobra Command
- Crimson Guard
- Night Creepers

== Notes ==
- Santelmo, Vincent (1994). The Official 30th Anniversary Salute To G.I. Joe 1964-1994. Krause Publications. ISBN 0-87341-301-6.
- Bellomo, Mark (2009). The Ultimate Guide to G.I. Joe 1982-1994. Krause Publications. ISBN 978-0-89689-922-3.
- Hidalgo, Pablo (2009). G.I. Joe vs. Cobra: The Essential Guide 1982-2008. Random House. ISBN 978-0-345-51642-8.
