= Crimson Guard =

Fictional soldiers from the G.I. Joe franchise

- G.I. Joe character
- First appearance: 1985
- Voiced by: Various

In-universe information
- Affiliation: Cobra
- Specialty: Elite Tooper
- File name: Various
- Birth place: Various
- SN: Various
- Rank: E-4
- Primary MOS: Undercover Espionage
- Secondary MOS: Accounting
- Subgroups: Crimson Guard
- Series: All depictions

The Crimson Guard is an elite organization within the fictional G.I. Joe universe. They are members of Cobra Command, the nemesis of the G.I. Joe team. They are often referred to by a phonetic spelling of their organization's initials, as "Siegies", in the comics. Tomax and Xamot are the commanders of the Crimson Guard.

== Toys ==
The first Crimson Guard figure was released in 1985. The figure wore a red dress uniform with silver decorations and a red helmet with black mask that covered his entire face. The accessories included a rifle with bayonet and red backpack. In 1989, the figure was repainted yellow and gray as part of the special Python Patrol sub group. In 1991, an armored version of the Crimson Guard, known as the Crimson Guard Immortals was introduced, wielding tube rocket launchers and a squad automatic weapon. In 1993, near the end of the original 3 3/4 inch G.I. Joe line, lightly armored Crimson Guard Commanders were released.

After the relaunch of the G.I. Joe line in 2001, other incarnations of the Crimson Guard were produced. The first was part of Hasbro's Direct to Consumer line, which featured a slightly redesigned look. Another is a new subset, featuring repaints of the 2005 Crimson Guard Force figures, redone in black and gold, with melee weapons, and named the Crimson Shadow Guard.

Another notable toy incarnation of the Crimson Guard is the 2004 Operation Crimson Sabotage K.B. Toys Exclusive. The set consisted of three Crimson Guard figures, and included two vehicles; a crimson H.I.S.S. tank (High Speed Sentry), and a crimson A.S.P. (Assault Systems Pod) mobile flak emplacement. Hasbro also released the Crimson Guard for the 25th anniversary toyline. This figure included a G3w/ bayonet, a revolver, a built in holster, and a specially designed backpack.

== Comic books ==
In the Marvel and Devil's Due comic series, the Crimson Guard are the most elite soldiers of Cobra's Viper legions, under the direct command of Tomax and Xamot, but completely loyal to Cobra Commander, serving as his personal guard. Building the Crimson Guard network was believed to be the first thing Cobra Commander did after founding Cobra. Crimson Guardsmen are not wasted on the battlefield like the more common Vipers and Cobra Troopers. Rather, "Siegie" agents operate undercover all over the country, in the political arenas and business world. All Crimson Guardsmen must hold a degree in either law, medicine, or accountancy, and be in top physical condition. They strive to present a facade of exemplary normalcy and civic responsibility, and are provided with fully supported cover identities, and even pre-fabricated "families". However, these agents are accumulating financial and political influence for Cobra through every means possible, supporting each other in creating schemes of blackmail, fraud and espionage.

Each member is rigorously trained and inducted in a secret ceremony in the lowest levels of Cobra's headquarters. To be a Crimson Guard is to swear absolute loyalty to Cobra and Cobra Commander. Many members also become part of a "series", undergoing plastic surgery and behavior modification to look and act like one another within a series. This allows one series member to completely replace another should the need arise without arousing suspicion. The most commonly depicted is the "Fred" Series.

=== Marvel Comics ===
A Fred is assigned early on to spy on Fort Wadsworth, the suspected home of the G.I. Joe. He tends to miss important intelligence by coincidence. This Fred is killed during an attempt by Destro to kill Snake Eyes in his mountain cabin. The Fred who replaces him turns out to be Wade Collins, a soldier who served with Stalker, Snake Eyes, and Storm Shadow in Vietnam and believes that he was abandoned by the U.S. Army during the war and by his country afterwards, leading him to join Cobra in a fit of bitterness. Collins eventually decides to leave Cobra and, with help from G.I. Joe, relocates with his family. Collins's son, Kamakura, eventually joins G.I. Joe.

Fred VII is one of the noted Guard members. He is an owner of an auto repair shop and a developer of advanced cybernetic and bionic devices. This Fred would gain infamy when, from 1987 to the early 1990s, he would pretend to be Cobra Commander, donning the silver "battle armor" that the action figures introduced in the late 1980s. Fred VII's coup is destroyed when the real Cobra Commander made his return.

Another Guardsman, Cobra scientist Professor Appel, is featured in multiple G.I. Joe comic books. He is revealed when Joe forces attack his suburban home. He later comes up with part of the plan that creates Cobra Island. Appel's daughter, Candy, also influences the plot at the same time as she is the romantic interest of Ripcord. At one point, Appel even saves Ripcord from certain death on account of his daughter.

Later, again on Cobra Island, Crimson Guardsmen (with Cobra Trooper backup) are deployed into three sniper teams. They planned to assassinate Serpentor when he arrived with personnel picked up from the town of Springfield. This plan is deduced and the sniper teams are foiled when Serpentor literally hangs onto Cobra Commander, then whips the crowd up into a frenzy of good cheer. They are ordered off their shots for fear of starting a riot.

The Guard end up on the battlefield during the first Cobra civil war.

=== Action Force ===
Action Force is a series of comics with the Joe characters based out of London. In issue #11, two Crimson Guards, one male and one female, attempt to destroy the Eiffel Tower but are stopped by a Joe team. In the next issue, ten more Guards are captured in a raid on a Cobra base/fast food restaurant. A Guardsman makes a cameo as the co-pilot for Copperhead.

Later, a CG undercover is revealed as working as a school teacher. His uniform is uncovered due to an unlocked door and a curious student named Gary. The CG takes the entire class hostage and shoots dead another teacher. While Footloose does have the man under the sniper rifle crosshairs it is Gary who talks the man into surrendering.

=== Devil's Due comics ===
Not all "Sieges" remain loyal. An older member, Fletcher, is murdered before he can talk to the United Nations.

A Crimson Guardsman named Agent X-99 is listed as a Cobra operative in the Threat List printed in G.I. Joe: America's Elite #25. Agent X-99 was first seen in the Sunbow episode "The Germ".

The flashback series 'Declassified' showcased an early participant in the CG program.

A Crimson Guardsman named Colonel Calvin is featured in an early storyline in America's Elite. He was assigned to a research station in the Amazon, well before the Crimson Twins joined Cobra. Surrounded only by BATs, cut off from support for unknown reasons, he went mad. He decides to make Cobra Commander pay for abandoning him and rigs an ICBM to attack his current location. Somehow Calvin found out about Cobra Commander disguising himself as a member of the US President's cabinet. Duke tracks down Calvin and is held captive by him. Duke breaks free and kills Calvin, but not before finding out about Cobra Commander.

Another Guardsman is featured in later stories. This particular Guardsman rises through the ranks to the elite Shadow Guard. He is picked from them to become part of The Plague, an elite squad created from Cobra ranks to become an answer to G.I. Joe, and given the codename Infrared. Like the Shadow Guard, the Plague is answerable directly to Cobra Commander. All the Plague members receive biographies in issue 30 of America's Elite. The Joes suspect this Guardsman of being a movie actor.

== Animated series ==
=== Sunbow ===
These soldiers, which are featured in the cartoon G.I. Joe, are the elite of Cobra. As with all soldiers in the first season they fight on land, sea, and air acting almost as officers as well as serving as Cobra Commander's bodyguards. On at least one occasion, Cobra Commander refers to his "Red Guard". In the first-season episodes after the "Pyramid of Darkness" mini-series, Crimson Guard members also act as deep-cover or sleeper agents, conducting operations in civilian guises that would require either too many operatives or too long an operation time for Zartan to be a feasible agent. In the second season, they seemed to serve more as bodyguards than anything else.

The Crimson Guard is led by the mirror twins characters Tomax and Xamot, who handle all of Cobra's business affairs. They are in direct command of the Crimson Guard; however, Tomax and Xamot are loyal to Cobra Commander, in turn, putting the Crimson Guard at Cobra Commander's disposal. During the second season, Tomax and Xamot became loyal to Serpentor, which in turn placed the Crimson Guard out of Cobra Commander's disposal and into Serpentor's disposal.

Different voice actors have voiced members of the Crimson Guard: Michael Bell, Corey Burton, Chris Latta, and Lee Weaver. The Crimson Guard X-99 from "The Germ" was voiced by Neil Ross.

=== DiC ===
In the Dragon Fire mini-series of the 1989 G.I. Joe cartoon, their new leader was Destro and some were part of a group of Cobra soldiers who became Python Patrol Crimson Guards and under the newly-restored Cobra Commander overthrew Serpentor. Additionally, an undercover Crimson Guardsman infiltrates G.I. Joe as a reporter and is offered a position on the team as war correspondent Scoop. He later learns Cobra lied to him and joins G.I. Joe for real. His Cobra handler, another Crimson Guard, switches divisions and becomes an Alley Viper.

In "The Greatest Evil" two-parter, a Crimson Guard Immortal's sister is hospitalized after overdosing on the drug Spark, created by the Headman. This Crimson Guard Immortal (voiced by Don Brown) teams meets Duke whose brother Falcon is also an addict. The two agree to join forces to stop the Headman. Despite his love for his sister, the Crimson Guard Immortal gets caught up in Cobra's scheme to use the alliance to rob the Headman of his profits. His sister and Falcon team up to replace the money with worthless paper and then donate the real money to drug rehab programs.

=== Renegades ===
In the G.I. Joe: Renegades episode "Brothers of Light," the Crimson Guard are homaged as the elite guards for Tomax and Xamot's cult. A brainwashed Duke, Scarlett, and Roadblock were shown as Crimson Guards until Tunnel Rat and Snake Eyes freed them from the mind-control.
