= Spirit (G.I. Joe) =

Character in G.I. Joe

- G.I. Joe character
- Illustration of Spirit and his bald eagle sidekick Freedom from G.I. Joe: Order of Battle. Art by Herb Trimpe.
- First appearance: 1984
- Voiced by: Gregg Berger (Sunbow); Maurice LaMarche (DiC); Darren Dunstan (Sigma 6)

In-universe information
- Affiliation: G.I. Joe
- Specialty: Tracker
- File name: Iron-Knife, Charlie
- Birth place: Taos, NM
- SN: RA146231009
- Rank: E-4 (Specialist); E-6 (Petty Officer First Class) (Devil's Due comics)
- Primary MOS: Infantry
- Secondary MOS: Social Services
- Subgroups: Slaughter's Marauders

Spirit (sometimes called Spirit Iron-Knife), is a fictional character from the G.I. Joe: A Real American Hero toyline, comic books and animated series. He is the G.I. Joe Team's original tracker and debuted in 1984.

== Profile ==
His real name is Charlie Iron-Knife, and he was born to a poor Native American family in the Taos Pueblo Reservation in Taos, New Mexico.

His primary military specialty is infantry and his secondary military specialty is social services. He was a hunting guide through high school and then served in Southeast Asia after joining the military. Spirit returned to civilian life to complete his education and then inexplicably returned to the service. His primary specialty is as a tracker, and he is a qualified expert with the M-16, M1911A1 Auto Pistol, and the Remington sniper rifle.

Spirit's costume and specialty highlight his identity as a Native American medicine man and shaman. He sports long braided hair, a headband, a knife being a prominent weapon, and pants with designs typical of some Native American tribes. A new version of his costume designed by the Devil's Due comic book company ditched most of the obvious aspects of his heritage, and emphasized a more military aspect.

== Toys ==
Spirit was introduced as an action figure in 1984. In the Slaughter's Marauders toy line released in 1989, his birthplace is written as Grand Canyon, Arizona. It is corrected back to Taos, New Mexico in the new toy released in 2005. He has a companion pet bald eagle named Freedom.

A new version of Spirit was released as part of the Air Commandos line in 1992. The latest release of Spirit was in 2022 from the new 6-Inch G.I. Joe Classified Series.

== Comics ==
=== Marvel Comics ===
Spirit's first comic book appearance is in G.I. Joe: A Real American Hero #31 (January 1985) from Marvel Comics. His first mission was guarding Snake Eyes, who is staying at his cabin at the time. That issue showed some of his capabilities as a hunter and tracker. He was the only one who spotted a Cobra tracking device inside the C-130 plane they were flying on. During that mission, he and Airborne kept moving around and trying to deceive Snake Eyes from their presence. After injuries from that mission, he was seen in a shopping mall in G.I. Joe #33 looking for medicinal herbs. In the same issue, he is recognized by a Crimson Guardsman, which results in several others Joes battling Cobra forces. Spirit later participates in the invasion of Springfield, and Cobra Island.

In issue #100, Spirit has accompanied Mutt to Millville. While there, the two visit Mutt's uncle Jeff. Mutt's dog Junkyard naturally comes with. During their stay, Cobra invades and takes over the town. Most of the citizenry are brainwashed one by one. Spirit and Mutt form a resistance movement. Assisted by Junkyard, they ambush a Cobra patrol, taking out two soldiers and a HISS Tank. They stop to check on Jeff, who seemingly betrays them. The two are joined by a local veterinarian and a small group of teenagers. The whole thing falls apart when it is discovered there was ever the presence of Cobra, although the town returns to its brainwashed condition when the authorities leave. Mutt and Spirit are arrested on the orders of Hawk.

This incident casts an aspersion on G.I. Joe, but the two are cleared of all wrongdoing after a court trial.

In his last few appearances, he can be seen guarding the entrance to the Joe's headquarters, a new version of the Pit. Spirit refuses to let anyone enter until they give the proper codewords. Spirit's pet eagle, Freedom, does not appear until #130.

=== Devil's Due ===
In the first issue of Devil's Due G.I. Joe series, Spirit is one of the many soldiers called back into active duty.

Spirit is featured in the one-shot G.I. Joe: The Hunt for Cobra Commander, set in the year between the Devil's Due A Real American Hero series and G.I. Joe: America's Elite series. The story is largely told via e-mails Spirit sends Hawk, while conducting a solo investigation of Cobra Commander's whereabouts. Spirit is later found by the Joes imprisoned at an old Cobra base, and rejoins the team. In this Devil's Due version, Spirit has earned his doctorate's degree in counseling psychology.

== Animated series ==
=== Sunbow ===
In the G.I. Joe animated series, Spirit first appeared in the mini-series The Revenge of Cobra. He is voiced by Gregg Berger, while Freedom's vocal effects are provided by Frank Welker. In that mini-series, he was used as a foil to Storm Shadow, fighting one another to a stalemate over a fragment of the Weather Dominator. Afterwards, in the regular series, he was usually a background character.

In the first-season episode "Countdown for Zartan", Spirit and Freedom are on guard in the Worldwide Defense Center, where Zartan infiltrates posing as the French scientist Dr. Emil Mettier. Suspicious of "Mettier", Spirit follows him, leading to another encounter with Storm Shadow. Spirit sends Freedom to call for help before he is knocked out by Zartan. Spirit is imprisoned alongside the real Dr. Mettier in a Cobra base, where they are tortured by the Dreadnoks with laughing gas. However, he allows himself and Dr. Mettier to escape by throwing his knife into a button on a control panel that frees them.

Spirit had a major appearance in "Satellite Down", in which he is among the Joes on a mission to recover a satellite that crashed in Africa. Spirit meets Storm Shadow once again, as Cobra seeks to obtain the satellite as well. After a brief battle, both G.I. Joe and Cobra forces are captured by a race of ape-men known as the Primords. Spirit frees Storm Shadow for the Joes and Cobra to ally against the Primords, but the Joes later become friendly with the Primords, who assist them in fighting Cobra. Spirit fights Storm Shadow for a short time before the latter flees.

In the two-part episode "Captives of Cobra", Spirit is one of the Joes whose relatives are captured and brainwashed by Cobra. Prior to the kidnappings of his grandfather and cousin, he is seen attending his cousin's ceremony to womanhood.

In the episode "Excalibur", Spirit sets up an anti-Cobra satellite in Britain with other Joes. He also heals Quick Kick's broken leg in moments and helps him rescue Footloose.

==== G.I. Joe: The Movie ====
Spirit can be seen several times during the Battle of the Statue of Liberty in the opening of G.I. Joe: The Movie.

=== DiC ===
Spirit appeared in DiC's G.I. Joe cartoon, voiced by Maurice LaMarche.

=== Sigma 6 ===
In the G.I. Joe: Sigma 6 series, Spirit, or Spirit Iron-Knife, is the team's resident tracker. He has a hi-tech suit. His pet is a falcon named "Billy".

=== Resolute ===
Spirit is briefly seen in G.I. Joe: Resolute and along the joes present when looking at footage of Moscow's destruction by Cobra's Particle Cannon.

== Video games ==
Spirit is one of the featured characters in the 1985 G.I. Joe: A Real American Hero computer game. He is a non-playable supporting character in the 1992 game G.I. Joe: The Atlantis Factor.

== Books ==
Spirit is a supporting character in the Find Your Fate novel, "Operation: Star Raider".
