= G.I. Joe (Energon Universe) =

American comic book series

Publication information
- Publisher: Skybound Entertainment (Image Comics)
- Format: Ongoing series
- Publication date: November 15, 2023 – present
- No. of issues: 25
- Editors: Ben Abernathy; Sean Mackiewicz; Jonathan Manning

G.I. Joe is an ongoing line of American comic books published by Image Comics and Skybound Entertainment. Based on the G.I. Joe franchise by Hasbro, the comics are part of the Energon Universe line; It contains four limited series followed by an ongoing series.

== Publication history ==
=== Background ===
After IDW Publishing lost the licenses to produce Transformers and G.I. Joe comics by the end of 2022, Hasbro announced in June 2023 that Skybound Entertainment, an imprint of Image Comics, would acquire those licenses.

=== Development ===
==== Codename: G.I. Joe (prequel limited series) ====
Starting in December 2023, Skybound began publishing four limited series set in the Energon Universe, starting with Duke and Cobra Commander, being written by Joshua Williamsonn, with art and colors by Tom Reilly, Andrea Milana, Jordie Bellaire and Annalisa Leoni respectively.

Williamson said the series offered a new take on Duke and the formation of G.I. Joe that would honor the characters while taking them in a new direction, and said he had been collecting the "G.I. Joe Classified" figures in the years beforehand.

In October 2023, Skybound announced that the main roster of G.I. Joe features Duke, Hawk, Stalker and Baroness, while the main roster of Cobra features Cobra Commander, Destro, Zarana and Mercer.

In March 2024, Skybound announced the last two of the four initial limited series: Scarlett, written by Kelly Thompson, drawn by Marco Ferrari and colored by Lee Loughridge; and Destro, written by Dan Watters, drawn by Andrei Bressan and colored by Adriano Lucas.

Thompson said, “I'm fortunate that, thanks to my job, I often get to dig into characters and worlds that I’ve loved for a long time, but G.I. Joe's Scarlett is truly one of my first geek loves as a kid, and I am absolutely thrilled to have a hand in building her for this new, incredibly cool and rich universe at Skybound.”

Watters added, “I'm incredibly excited to bring Destro to life with Andrei. This is going to be a visceral, explosive thriller in which he [Destro] isn't very nice to anyone at all — everything you'd want from your favorite amoral arms trafficker.”

==== G.I. Joe (mainline ongoing series) ====
As announced in the Energon Universe 2024 Special, a new ongoing G.I. Joe series in being planned for development, being a direct continuation of the Duke, Cobra Commander, Scarlett and Destro limited series. The series will feature the Duke creative team, with Williamson returning as writer, Reilly as illustrator, and Bellaire as colorist. The first issue debuted on November 13, 2024.

To promote the debut issue, Skybound announced a fan initiative titled "Choose Your Side", in which readers submit photos and publicly declare their loyalty to either the G.I. Joe or Cobra factions. Additionally, on the same publishing date of issue #1, there was a screening of G.I. Joe: The Movie (1987) in AMC City Walk, in Los Angeles, which includes a panel discussion featuring Williamson.

== Premise ==
In response to the arrival of Cybertronians on Earth, G.I. Joe wants to investigate their origins while Cobra wants to harness the power of Energon.

== Overview ==
| Series | Volume | Title | Issues | First released | Last released | Writer | Artists | Colorists |
|---|---|---|---|---|---|---|---|---|
| Duke | 1 | "Knowing is Half the Battle" | 5 + 2024 Special | December 27, 2023 | May 4, 2024 | Joshua Williamson | Tom Reilly; Jason Howard | Jordie Bellaire; Mike Spicer |
| Cobra Commander | 1 | "Determined to Rule the World" | 5 | January 17. 2024 | May 22, 2024 | Joshua Williamson | Andrea Milana | Annalisa Leoni |
| Scarlett | 1 | "Secret Mission" | 5 | June 5, 2024 | October 9, 2024 | Kelly Thompson | Marco Ferrari | Lee Loughridge |
| Destro | 1 | "The Enemy" | 5 | June 19, 2024 | October 16, 2024 | Dan Watters | Andrei Bressan; Andrea Milana | Adriano Lucas |
| G.I. Joe | 1 | "The Cobra Strikes!" | 6 | November 13, 2024 | April 23, 2025 | Joshua Williamson | Tom Reilly | Jordie Bellaire |
| G.I. Joe | 2 | "Bludd's Revenge" | 6 + 2025 Special | May 3, 2025 | October 15, 2025 | Joshua Williamson | Andrea Milana; Marco Foderà | Lee Loughridge |
| G.I. Joe | 3 | "Dreadnok War" | 6 | November 5, 2025 | January 28, 2026 | Joshua Williamson | Tom Reilly; Marco Foderà | Jordie Bellaire; Lee Loughridge |
| G.I. Joe | 4 | "The Hunt for Energon" | 6 | February 18, 2026 | July 15, 2026 | Joshua Williamson | Andrea Milana | Lee Loughridge |
| G.I. Joe | 5 | "Night Force" | 6 + 2026 Special | May 2, 2026 | January 20, 2027 | Joshua Williamson | Tom Reilly; Andrea Milana | Lee Loughridge |

== Plot ==
=== Codename: G.I. Joe (2023–2024) ===
| Issue | Written by | Drawn by | Colored by | Publication date |
==== Duke — "Knowing is Half the Battle" ====
| 01 | Joshua Williamson | Tom Reilly | Jordie Bellaire | December 27, 2023 |
Sometime after his friend Tyler "Frosting" Frost was killed by a plane that transformed into a giant robot, (Note: As depicted in Transformers #2.) Conrad "Duke" Hauser meets with his commanding officer, Colonel Hawk. Hawk orders him to return to duty and stop investigating the incident, to which Duke refuses. Six months later, Duke connects with Doctor Adele Burkhart at a conspiracy theory gathering in Washington, D.C., who informs him that he may have stumbled onto a secret arms race related to her research and directs him to M.A.R.S. Industries for more answers. Duke discovers that the company is producing a range of advanced robotic frames and exosuits, leading him to believe they created the robot that killed Frosting. He is discovered and thrown out by M.A.R.S. security operative Mercer, who lets him live upon request from his employer. Duke returns to the conspiracy theorists only to discover that the meeting was massacred. The dying Burkhart tells him the killers stole almost all of her research and gives him the last hard drive, warning him not to let it fall into the wrong hands. Police storm the building and attack Duke, who escapes into the night. Hawk's superiors order him to find Duke, and he tasks Stalker and Rock 'n Roll with capturing him.
| 02 | Joshua Williamson | Tom Reilly | Jordie Bellaire | January 31, 2024 |
Duke arrives at the auto shop where his old friend Clutch works, who agrees to patch his wounds and help however he can. Although Clutch doesn't fully believe Duke's story about the giant robot, he discovers that Burkhart's drive doubles as a highly advanced tracker for her research, located somewhere in the western United States. As Destro, the CEO of M.A.R.S. Industries, receives an alert, Duke and Clutch leave to investigate but are ambushed by Rock 'n Roll. They flee in one of Clutch's custom vans, but Rock 'n Roll leads them into Stalker's sniper trap, who disables the van and knocks both men unconscious. Duke and Clutch are arrested and brought to the Pit, an underground prison for high-risk inmates, where Duke's railings against the justice system catch the attention of a mysterious woman imprisoned nearby.
| 03 | Joshua Williamson | Tom Reilly | Jordie Bellaire | February 28, 2024 |
As M.A.R.S. relocates its headquarters in the wake of Duke's infiltration, Destro tasks Major Bludd with tracking down and eliminating him. In the Pit, Hawk informs Stalker and Rock 'n Roll that Duke will be transferred to a new facility in two hours, while Duke identifies the mysterious woman as Anastasia Cisarovna, the Baroness. Bludd's forces hijack the prison transport and storm the Pit, and Rock 'n Roll frees Duke and Clutch to evacuate. Duke reluctantly frees the Baroness as well, but Bludd attacks him before they can escape. During their fight, Bludd reveals that he killed Burkhart and plans to kill Duke as well to collect the large bounty on his head; however, the Baroness shoots him and threatens to take down Duke for the bounty.
| 04 | Joshua Williamson | Tom Reilly | Jordie Bellaire | March 27, 2024 |
As Bludd's forces continue attacking the Pit, Duke convinces the Baroness to join him and the others in fighting back. She accepts, to the others' consternation, and the group discovers a hangar full of decommissioned experimental vehicles that Clutch repairs. A grievously wounded Bludd, now missing an eye, orders his men to destroy the Pit, but they are beset by Duke's team and their new armaments – an APC, a MOBAT, and a Skystriker. The Baroness escapes in a F.A.N.G. jet during the chaos, and Duke also leaves to follow Burkhart's tracker, leading to a secret M.A.R.S. test facility in the Rocky Mountains. Destro oversees a failed test of the new H.I.S.S. tank, whose power cores are insufficient, and orders Scrap-Iron to prepare his newest invention for the incoming Duke. As Duke arrives and discovers more of M.A.R.S.'s robotic weapons, he vows to destroy their giant robot; however, he is attacked by a Battle Android Trooper.
| 05 | Joshua Williamson | Tom Reilly | Jordie Bellaire | May 4, 2024 |
In the remains of the Pit, Clutch refuses to tell Hawk where Duke went, but Stalker reveals they discovered Burkhart's tracker in the wreckage. As the Battle Android Trooper strangles Duke, Destro reveals himself and offers Duke a position with M.A.R.S.. Duke refuses and accuses Destro of being responsible for Frosting's death, but he denies building the transforming robot. Destro leaves Duke at the B.A.T.'s mercy and orders Scrap-Iron to destroy the facility as he and Mercer depart. As the facility explodes, Duke manages to overpower the B.A.T. and destroy its power source, collapsing from his injuries. Later, he awakens in a hospital to find Hawk and Cover Girl waiting, who informs him that the news believes he is dead and posthumously cleared of Burkhart's murder. Hawk thanks him for his assistance in exposing Destro's operations; he later brings Duke to the Pit and asks him to form a highly trained special mission force capable of handling a variety of new emerging threats. Although Duke refuses at first, he agrees when Hawk shows him footage of more transforming robots like the one that killed Frosting, including one that turns into a truck.
| 2024 Special | Joshua Williamson | Tom Reilly | Jordie Bellaire | March 13, 2024 |
As Duke begins assembling his new team, he also decides to recruit the Baroness, despite Hawk's apparent objections. He rescues the Baroness from an ambush by two mysterious armored assassins and asks her to join his team to keep them honest, on edge, and wary of authority. She agrees, especially after learning her alternative is returning to prison. Meanwhile, Hawk meets with the two assassins, Flint and Lady Jaye, who voice their doubts about including the Baroness in Duke's new operation. However, Hawk's plans to bring the two together have worked out well, especially since he does not want Duke to know he is organizing multiple special forces teams.
==== Cobra Commander — "Determined to Rule the World" ====
| 01 | Joshua Williamson | Andrea Milana | Annalisa Leoni | January 17. 2024 |
In the secret underground society of Cobra-La, whose humanoid residents rely solely on organic biotechnology, an angry mob attacks a science lab housing a foreign metal specimen. The scientists' commander orders them to protect their research, but one of them accidentally detonates an explosive spore in his face. He is healed and given a metal helmet to hide his wounds, and Pythona brings him to Cobra-La's leader Golobulus to answer for himself. The furious Golobulus berates the commander for disregarding Cobra-La's reverence for organic life through his experiments on the specimen's alien technology, even after they took him in from the human world. Golobulus also reveals he knows the commander instigated the riot to gain power and orders him to be executed; however, the commander kills his guards with several small insectoid robots and requests to depart on a special mission to strengthen Cobra-La. Golobulus reluctantly agrees, and the commander returns to the lab and extracts more data and Energon from the specimen – an imprisoned and deactivated Megatron. As he departs, plotting to conquer the world in Cobra-La's name, he overlooks Megatron momentarily reawakening. Accompanied by a Cobra-La grunt disguised as a human, the commander hijacks a truck and kills its driver for transport to a large Energon deposit in Florida. He vows the world will soon fear the name of Cobra Commander, unaware that others are already harvesting the Energon.
| 02 | Joshua Williamson | Andrea Milana | Annalisa Leoni | February 21, 2024 |
In the Florida swamps, Buzzer and Ripper of the Dreadnoks gang torture and kill a pair of gunrunners for interfering in their territory. The Commander and the grunt begin their investigation, and the grunt recalls Pythona's orders to watch the Commander as they track the Energon further into the swamps. The two are confronted by a park ranger, who is quickly murdered by the grunt as the Commander slips away. He encounters the Dreadnoks, who flee after he destroys their vehicle. Zarana warns her brothers not to follow him into the restricted areas of the swamps as the Commander discovers a large body of water infused with Energon; however, he falls in while gloating and is quickly overwhelmed by a horde of Energon-enhanced alligators.
| 03 | Joshua Williamson | Andrea Milana | Annalisa Leoni | March 20, 2024 |
The grunt gets lost in the swamps looking for the Commander as he is captured by Zandar and taken back to the Dreadnoks' hideout. One by one, Buzzer, Torch, Ripper, Zandar, and Zarana torture the Commander but fail to break him, and he slowly begins turning his captors against one another. Zarana finally gives up and orders him to be taken to a secret bunker and executed, but the Commander activates a hidden tracking device. Just before he is killed, the Cobra-La grunt arrives, and the Commander orders him to dispose of the Dreadnoks so they can claim the Energon in Golobulus' name. With Buzzer's chainsaw ineffective against him, the grunt sheds his human disguise to reveal the monstrous form of the Nemesis Enforcer.
| 04 | Joshua Williamson | Andrea Milana | Annalisa Leoni | April 17, 2024 |
As the Enforcer begins slaughtering the Dreadnoks, the Commander forces Ripper to show him the secret bunker, where a captive scientist has been experimenting with Energon. The scientist shows the Commander the results of his work, including how raw pink Energon can be refined and transmuted into new forms and colors, and the Commander upgrades his insectoid robots with a cube of blue Energon. Zarana, Zandar, Torch, and Buzzer manage to distract the Enforcer long enough to escape, but he lets them leave and turns on the Commander instead as Ripper flees. He reveals that Golobulus ordered him to dispose of the Commander once he discovered a way to harness the power of Energon, and he is no longer needed now that they have the scientist. However, the Commander kills the Enforcer and catches up with Ripper, who reveals that the Dreadnoks planned to sell the Energon to Destro of M.A.R.S. Industries.
| 05 | Joshua Williamson | Andrea Milana | Annalisa Leoni | May 22, 2024 |
The Commander begins attacking and raiding M.A.R.S. facilities across the United States, eventually inviting Destro to meet via Ripper. Destro, Mercer, Ripper, and a squadron of M.A.R.S. troops arrive at a seemingly idyllic small American town, but a hidden laser turret kills the troops. Destro reluctantly agrees to hear the Commander's proposal, who takes them to the underground lab of Dr. Laszlo Vandermeer, the scientist he rescued from the Dreadnoks. The Commander requests to ally M.A.R.S.'s technological might with his Energon production capabilities to unite the world's criminal elements. He demonstrates the potential by supercharging one of Destro's Battle Android Troopers with Energon, which effortlessly kills dozens of his own recruits. Destro agrees to the alliance, and the Commander formally organizes the partnership between his troops and M.A.R.S. into Cobra. Meanwhile, the denizens of Cobra-La are still reeling from Megatron's recent escape. (Note: As depicted in the Energon Universe 2024 Special – Transformers story.) Golobulus and Pythona raid the Commander's lab and discover his captive came from an entirely mechanical planet, the antithesis to Cobra-La's way of life. Fearing that more creatures like Megatron are already on Earth, Golobulus sends Pythona and a contingent of Cobra-La warriors into space to find their robotic homeworld – Cybertron.
==== Scarlett — "Secret Mission" ====
| 01 | Kelly Thompson | Marco Ferrari | Lee Loughridge | June 5, 2024 |
Special operative Shana "Scarlett" O'Hara infiltrates a private party in Monaco while searching for a group of hostages, with strict orders not to engage. However, she is distracted by the sudden arrival of her old friend Jinx, who disappeared on a mission several years ago. Jinx covertly signals Scarlett not to interfere, but she breaks orders to save her, allowing Jinx's mysterious team of ninjas to escape with a hostage. Scarlett is dismissed from her unit for her insubordination, and she returns home to find Stalker waiting for her; he reveals that Jinx disappeared while infiltrating Clan Arashikage and asks her to find the clan, rescue Jinx, and retrieve a secret weapon the Arashikage have in their possession. Her pilot Snow Job transports her to a mountaintop Arashikage hideout, where she fights her way through a horde of ninja to reach the clan's leader, the Hard Master. She offers her services to the Arashikage but is quickly knocked out from behind by Storm Shadow, the Hard Master's most loyal servant.
| 02 | Kelly Thompson | Marco Ferrari | Lee Loughridge | July 3, 2024 |
Scarlett awakens to find herself in captivity; following another coded message from Jinx, she frees herself and attacks another group of Arashikage ninjas, impressing the watching Storm Shadow. He invites her to have tea with him and the Hard Master, and she explains that she hopes to use her skills for a more useful cause after her dismissal from the United States military. The Hard Master agrees to give Scarlett a chance, as the Arashikage are planning to retrieve an ancient weapon of unusual origin stolen from them by the Mugenonami, a yakuza group. As Scarlett begins the mission, she recognizes that the assignment is a suicide mission but believes that Jinx is worth dying for.
| 03 | Kelly Thompson | Marco Ferrari | Lee Loughridge | August 7, 2024 |
Scarlett infiltrates the Mugenonami building in Tokyo and takes control of the primary security center, but is severely wounded while fighting off a group of katana-wielding enforcers. As Storm Shadow, Jinx, and a group of Arashikage ninjas take on a legion of Mugenonami forces at a neighboring building, Scarlett rigs the secondary security center to explore and kills another enforcer. With the Mugenonami complex thrown into chaos, she makes her way to the roof of the other building and finally reunites with Jinx, but they are interrupted by the arrival of a Cobra helicopter.
| 04 | Kelly Thompson | Marco Ferrari | Lee Loughridge | September 4, 2024 |
Jinx secretly warns Scarlett to be wary as Storm Shadow summons them; the Mugenonami moved the weapon to a lower floor when the Arashikage arrived, and orders the two to find an alternate route while he and the others engage them directly. Jinx knocks out any surveillance with an EMP device, allowing the two a few minutes to talk privately. She gives Scarlett intel to take back to Stalker but refuses to come herself, believing that the Arashikage could become a powerful ally against the rising threat of Cobra as long as she stays with them. As the EMP's effects wear off and the two resume their mission, Scarlett realizes the Mugenonami moved the weapon to an upper floor instead, and Storm Shadow's forces are walking into a trap. She and Jinx secure the weapon and dispatch its guards and a squadron of Cobra Troopers. Storm Shadow arrives to claim it, revealing it as the Sword of Life, an ancient blade crafted from Energon.
| 05 | Kelly Thompson | Marco Ferrari | Lee Loughridge | October 9, 2024 |
As Storm Shadow demonstrates the power of the Energon sword, he, Scarlett, and Jinx flee as another Cobra helicopter arrives and blows up the building floor. Cobra Commander arrives and shoots Scarlett, but Jinx saves her as the three escape into the streets of Tokyo. Scarlett rendezvous with Snow Job and passes on Jinx's intel, but tells him she plans to stay with Jinx and the Arashikage for as long as she has to. She returns to the Arashikage stronghold with Jinx and Storm Shadow, who present the Energon sword to the Hard Master. In recognition of his service, the Hard Master returns the sword to Storm Shadow, who gladly accepts its power.
==== Destro — "The Enemy" ====
| 01 | Dan Watters | Andrei Bressan | Adriano Lucas | June 19, 2024 |
The Prime Minister of Darklonia orders his soldiers to gun down a mob of civilian protestors, but a horde of Battle Android Troopers kills them. Destro accepts his resignation on behalf of Darklonia's people and installs his cousin Artyom Darklon in power. He is contacted by Cobra Commander, who worries the B.A.T.s will bring undue attention to Cobra's operations, but Destro hotly reminds the Commander that he is his partner, not his servant. Several weeks later, Astoria Carlton-Ritz, the new CEO of Hybrid Technologies following her father's death, arrives in Darklonia for an illegal arms fair. Mercer confirms that none of the companies attending have discovered Energon, but Destro is concerned about the conspicuous absence of Extensive Enterprises. Tomax and Xamot, the company's heads, personally execute a small military operation for injuring a unit of their Crimson Guard while combat drones attack the arms fair. As Destro's Iron Grenadiers engage the drones, he saves Astoria from a stray missile, which turns out to be a dud.
| 02 | Dan Watters | Andrei Bressan | Adriano Lucas | July 17, 2024 |
Destro, Tomax and Xamot order a series of attacks on each other's facilities, each believing the other was responsible for the drone invasion of Darklonia. Eventually, the Crimson Guard infiltrates the M.A.R.S. factory, which produces the B.A.T.s and also serves as their primary store of Energon; Destro destroys the facility to keep the substance secret. Both parties agree to meet for negotiations, but neither Destro nor Tomax and Xamot are willing to back down and compromise. Under threat from one of Destro's nuclear weapons, they eventually agree to cease the physical attacks in favor of corporate warfare. Destro returns to his secluded ancestral home in the Scottish Highlands, where he speaks with statues of previous Destros, unaware that a lone assassin is waiting for him to emerge.
| 03 | Dan Watters | Andrea Milana | Adriano Lucas | August 21, 2024 |
Destro leaves his family mausoleum to find Chameleon waiting for him. With his technology somehow incapacitated, he attempts to flee, but Chameleon shoots him and sends a group of the same drones that attacked Darklonia to disable his escape craft. At M.A.R.S. Industries, Mercer and Scrap-Iron discover the drones' technology is similar to the B.A.T.s, and the dud missile Destro saved Astoria from is still working. The injured Destro makes his way to a United States Air Force base and requests to speak with General Flagg. He tells him the history behind his family's signature mask – during the Wars of the Three Kingdoms, the original Laird Destro sold weapons to all sides, but the victorious Oliver Cromwell forced him to wear a scalding iron mask smelted from musket balls as punishment for his treachery. However, Destro's clan later reclaimed the mask as a symbol of pride instead. Just as the first Destro knew the value of himself and his weapons, the current Destro threatens to stop supplying the United States with M.A.R.S. weaponry, and Flagg begrudgingly agrees to his demands.
| 04 | Dan Watters | Andrei Bressan | Adriano Lucas | September 18, 2024 |
With Destro presumed dead, Tomax and Xamot offer Darklon a substantial sum in exchange for M.A.R.S.. Darklon agrees and prepares a demonstration of the B.A.T.s, who turn on each other due to flaws in their friend-or-foe identification system. Having requested a store of files from General Flagg, Destro learns the full story behind Duke's claims of a robot transforming into a jet and identifies Hybrid Technologies as its potential origin. He crashes a party hosted by Astoria and orders Scrap-Iron to fire a missile at her, but she somehow deactivates it using an EMP generated from her own body. Destro surmises that her abilities are from her father's experiments on her and accuses her of being behind the recent attacks. Astoria admits to being Chameleon and ambushing him in the Scottish Highlands out of fear that he had discovered her father's secret project – a peacekeeping artificial intelligence named Overkill, equipped with enough weapons and foresight to neutralize any threat before it occurs. She confesses that the AI has begun making decisions on its own, such as attacking the arms fair against her orders, and requests Destro's help in managing it as Tomax and Xamot arrange a meeting with Cobra Commander.
| 05 | Dan Watters | Andrei Bressan | Adriano Lucas | October 16, 2024 |
As Tomax and Xamot take the Commander on a tour of M.A.R.S. Industries' headquarters, they are confronted by Destro. He engages the Crimson Twins while the rest of their forces are routed and destroyed by Scrap-Iron, Chameleon, Mercer, a squadron of Overkill's drones, and the remaining B.A.T.s. Destro beats Tomax and Xamot into submission but refuses to kill them, instead proposing that they unite under Cobra's banner to prepare for the strange and alien forces emerging, which pleases the watching Commander. Destro later meets Astoria for lunch, and he surmises that the Commander was behind Overkill's funding; trusting neither, he destroys the Overkill command satellite with one of his nuclear warheads and shares a kiss with Astoria. Destro also meets with Darklon at their family tomb, who apologizes for his hasty sale of M.A.R.S. to Tomax and Xamot, and Destro forces another scalding iron mask onto his cousin's face as punishment. Meanwhile, at Cobra's headquarters, the Commander receives word of Overkill's destruction and that a large piece of Cybertron has fallen into the ocean. (Note: As depicted in Transformers #12.)

=== G.I. Joe (2024–present) ===
| Issue | Written by | Drawn by | Colored by | Publication date |
==== Volume 1: "The Cobra Strikes!" ====
| 01 | Joshua Williamson | Tom Reilly | Jordie Bellaire | November 13, 2024 |
Duke and his newly formed G.I. Joe special mission force – Clutch, Cover Girl, Stalker, Rock 'n Roll, and the Baroness – flub a training exercise, after which Duke confesses to Hawk they aren't ready for field duty. As Destro demonstrates a new Energon-powered laser weapon, an undercover United States government operative codenamed Risk is ordered to return from a mission in Abu Dhabi. Hawk reassures Duke that the many differences between the Joes will strengthen their team before giving them their first mission – they are to protect a research facility in Colorado currently studying a shard of technology recovered from the alien wreckage in the middle of the ocean. At the same time, Destro and Cobra Commander order Mercer and a contingent of Cobra Troopers and Vipers to storm the facility, steal the shard, and kill everyone inside. The Cobra forces ambush the Joes, interrupting the bickering Stalker and Baroness, and Duke manages to commandeer their F.A.N.G. aircraft as the others attempt to evacuate the alien technology. However, Mercer's Vipers arrive and kill Rock 'n Roll with their Energon weapons.
| 02 | Joshua Williamson | Tom Reilly | Jordie Bellaire | December 18, 2024 |
A horrified Cover Girl is cornered by Mercer as the Vipers claim the shard; their weapons easily destroy Duke's F.A.N.G., and he jumps back into the fight to attack Mercer, whom he recognizes as M.A.R.S.'s head of security. The facility descends into chaos as the Cobra Valkyries arrive and start killing the wounded, Baroness saves Stalker, and Clutch steals one of the Energon rifles. Not wanting their special weapons to fall into the Joes' hands, the Commander and Destro activate a self-destruct mechanism on all the weapons, which explode and destroy the facility as the remaining Cobra forces escape with the shard. In the aftermath, all the Joes are injured but alive except Rock 'n Roll and Clutch, who is missing and presumed dead. Duke informs Hawk about Cobra's possible connections to M.A.R.S., and Hawk introduces Duke to Risk, a former Air Force pilot turned CIA operative specializing in risk assessment and the newest member of G.I. Joe. However, Risk's condescending attitude and callous dismissal of Rock 'n Roll's death enrage Duke, and the two men begin to fight. At Cobra's headquarters in the town of Springfield, Destro and Cobra Commander plan the kidnapping of Dr. Archibald Monev and stealing his Brainwave Scanner device, unaware that Clutch has infiltrated the base disguised as a Viper.
| 03 | Joshua Williamson | Tom Reilly | Jordie Bellaire | January 15, 2025 |
The disguised Clutch is confronted by an angry Mercer but is saved by Destro, both unaware of his true nature. Destro briefs the assembled Vipers on their plan to retrieve Dr. Monev from protective custody before he testifies in front of Congress, but the Commander interrupts the meeting to report the presence of an intruder. One of the Cobra scientists, secretly a spy from Cobra-La, tries attacking the Commander, but he dispatches and throws him into a pit of ravenous serpents. Clutch slips away in the chaos as Stalker finally interrupts Duke and Risk's brawl. As he leaves to call Rock 'n Roll's family, Cover Girl receives a transmission from Clutch informing them of Cobra's plans. In Washington, D.C., Monev's security detail deviates from their pre-planned route, but Duke, Baroness, and Risk stop them before they can escape. Risk reveals Monev's guards were Crimson Guard sleeper agents, and they are suddenly attacked by Tomax and Xamot.
| 04 | Joshua Williamson | Tom Reilly | Jordie Bellaire | February 18, 2025 |
The Joes attempt to escape with Monev, but Tomax and Xamot's Stinger missile car easily overpowers their motorcycles. To prevent any civilian casualties, Duke surrenders his team, and all four are captured; meanwhile, Stalker and Cover Girl's attempt to return the Brainwave Scanner to storage fails, and Chameleon and Ripper capture them. At Cobra headquarters, Destro and Mercer discuss the reptilian remains of the Cobra-La spy and the Commander's many secrets, unaware that Clutch is spying on them nearby. The facility suddenly receives orders from the Commander to mobilize at M.A.R.S. headquarters, to Destro's confusion and anger, and Clutch departs with the other Cobra troops. Everyone arrives at M.A.R.S. with Monev and the Brainwave Scanner, where the Commander reveals his plan to modify the device into a brainwashing machine that will make its targets obey Cobra's commands. The five captured Joes are brought forth to serve as the machine's first test subjects.
| 05 | Joshua Williamson | Tom Reilly | Jordie Bellaire | March 19, 2025 |
Destro and Mercer gloat over Duke's captured team, but Clutch commandeers one of the H.I.S.S. tanks and throws Cobra into chaos. As the Joes retreat out of the line of fire, the Commander and Monev finish modifying the Brainwave Scanner; according to Monev's calculations, the machine's new explosive capabilities will enslave everyone within a five-mile blast radius, but all those within an initial one-mile epicenter will have their minds completely wiped, thanks to the potency of its Energon supply. Scrap-Iron destroys Clutch's H.I.S.S. with a bazooka, but the Joes launch a sudden counterattack and manage to break through and escape on a helicopter. Tomax and Xamot leave in disgust as a furious Destro pursues them in a F.A.N.G., but the Baroness suddenly notices that Duke is not with them. Meanwhile, the Commander betrays Monev and activates the machine with him inside; as he informs Destro the brain bomb is ready for transport, he is ambushed and held at gunpoint by Duke.
| 06 | Joshua Williamson | Tom Reilly | Jordie Bellaire | April 23, 2025 |
Cobra Commander nonchalantly introduces himself to Duke and raises the brain bomb to the roof. He informs Duke that the only way to deactivate it and save Washington, D.C. is to kill Monev. The two fight as Clutch goads the Baroness into going back to save Duke, and Destro orders the remaining Cobra forces to depart for Springfield. The Commander injures Duke, but he also kills Monev himself and deactivates the bomb after realizing that dying with Duke means Cobra would rule the world without him. The rest of G.I. Joe arrive to save their leader, and an impressed Commander spares Duke and returns to Springfield, where the irate Destro confronts him over compromising M.A.R.S. Industries. Acknowledging his demands for more information, the Commander reveals that the modified Brainwave Scanner's true purpose was to unlock a piece of Cybertronian technology and informs Destro about the existence of Megatron. Meanwhile, the Joes recuperate at the Pit, where Duke reiterates to Hawk that, despite the team's success against Cobra, his ultimate goal is to find and destroy the mysterious robots. Clutch leaves the Pit on a drive to clear his head, but his Jeep suddenly transforms into the Autobot Hound.
==== Volume 2: "Bludd's Revenge" ====
| 2025 Special | Joshua Williamson | Andrea Milana | Lee Loughridge | May 3, 2025 |
Hound, recently reactivated and on a scouting mission to find the rest of the Autobots, demands to know how and where Clutch found the Energon. Clutch's standard weapons have no effect on the Cybertronian, but he injures Hound with an Energon grenade he stole from Cobra; however, he realizes too late that Hound meant him no harm and agrees to help repair him. Clutch brings Hound to the workshop of his old friend Matt Trakker, who mysteriously already has experience fixing Cybertronian technology. Before Trakker can finish the repairs, Ravage suddenly breaks in and attacks Clutch and Trakker for their Energon, but Hound manages to drive the Decepticon away. Trakker finishes Hound's repairs and parts amicably with Clutch, requesting that he keeps their encounter secret. Clutch and Hound apologize to one another for their poor first meeting and agree to work together to investigate Cobra's supply of Energon weapons. Meanwhile, in the swamps of Florida, Buzzer ambushes a contingent of Cobra troopers sent to gather more Energon and swears vengeance on Cobra Commander.
| 07 | Joshua Williamson | Andrea Milana | Lee Loughridge | May 28, 2025 |
Assigned to steal a mysterious shipment of Darklonian origin from wealthy collector Victor Foley, the special agent Beach Head spends three days lurking on Foley's beachfront property. Once inside, he discovers to his dismay that nearly all of his intel was wrong – the shipping box is much larger than expected, Foley has a pair of civilian escorts complicating matters, and a troop of mercenaries suddenly attacks him as he tries to leave with the box. The mercenaries chain the box to a nearby truck and escape, destroying much of Foley's house in the process, but Beach Head manages to detach the chain. A second team of mercenaries on motorcycles pursues him, but Beach Head and the box are saved by a hovercraft. The mercenaries report back to Major Bludd, who kills them all for their failure, while Beach Head's saviors are revealed to be Flint and Lady Jaye. A furious Beach Head confronts them, afraid his superiors will force him to retire after his failure, but Flint invites him to join their secret special mission team, Night Force. They open the box and show Beach Head the charred remains of a Battle Android Trooper; meanwhile, Cover Girl finds a redacted report concerning Night Force and gives it to Hawk, who promptly shreds it.
| 08 | Joshua Williamson | Andrea Milana | Lee Loughridge | June 18, 2025 |
As the Joes conduct more training exercises under Duke's watch, Destro and Cobra Commander watch footage of Seattle being destroyed in a battle between two gigantic robots. (Note: As depicted in Transformers #17 and #18.) Destro agrees to send Mercer to search the city's wreckage for spare parts, but the Commander insists they must have a fully intact Cybertronian. After Duke and the Baroness nearly catch Clutch and Hound returning, she asks Duke to let her leave the Pit to clear her mind. He agrees on the condition that Cover Girl accompanies her, and the two fly to Paris for the weekend. The Baroness immediately tries to disappear, but Cover Girl tracks her to a small street café, unaware they are both being watched by Major Bludd's agents. At Cover Girl's pressing, the Baroness reluctantly tells her that she is watching her parents celebrate their anniversary at a neighboring café, unable to speak with them but wanting to see them regardless. Cover Girl begins to connect with her over the weight of her own parents' expectations, but a horde of falcons suddenly attacks the café. The two Joes help the civilians evacuate inside but are cornered by Raptor, who asks them to come meet with Bludd.
| 09 | Joshua Williamson | Andrea Milana | Lee Loughridge | July 16, 2025 |
The Baroness engages Raptor as Cover Girl moves to save her teammate's parents. However, Bludd uses the distraction to arrive, injure Cover Girl, and kill several police officers before the Baroness attacks him. Raptor captures both Joes in nets, and Bludd orders them taken to a safehouse, while Risk voices his suspicions about Clutch to Duke at the Pit. Hound tells Clutch about the Autobot-Decepticon conflict but begins to collapse from a lack of Energon, and Clutch promises to find him more of the alien fuel. Meanwhile, Mercer reports to Destro about his discovery of an imprisoned Agent Martin, the last surviving member of a rogue M.A.R.S. salvage team that was slaughtered by a robot named Starscream. (Note: As depicted in Transformers #14.) Destro requests that Mercer keep this new information secret from the Commander and execute the insane Martin, while Cover Girl and the Baroness awaken in a rocky pit. From above, Bludd assures the two that he has no intention of killing them, as the Baroness' many enemies would pay handsomely for the opportunity at revenge. However, he throws a knife into the pit and orders them to settle the matter of his missing eye – either the Baroness must kill Cover Girl to be sold intact, or Cover Girl must cut out the Baroness' eye on Bludd's behalf to survive. As the Baroness challenges Bludd to face her himself, Cover Girl grabs the knife and stabs her in the back.
| 10 | Joshua Williamson | Andrea Milana | Lee Loughridge | August 20, 2025 |
To Bludd's anger, Cover Girl refuses to finish the job and echoes the injured Baroness' challenge to come take her eye himself. After he tells them that Raptor stands ready to kill the Baroness' parents, she begins to fight Cover Girl for their safety. Clutch and Hound leave the Pit to search for more of Cobra's Energon-powered weapons, unaware that Risk is following them, while a worried Destro confides in Astoria about his suspicions of the Commander's mysterious past. Forcing his way into his ally's private laboratory, Destro discovers several mangled and mutilated Cobra Troopers being experimented on before the Commander confronts him. As Bludd reads some of his poetry aloud, the Baroness seemingly snaps Cover Girl's neck; however, when he jumps into the pit to continue gloating, Cover Girl breaks his ankle and escapes to save the Baroness' parents from Raptor. Clutch leaves Hound behind to search the wreckage of M.A.R.S. Industries for Energon, where Risk ambushes him and accuses him of being a brainwashed Cobra double agent. Mercer and a squadron of Cobra Vipers confront the two Joes, unaware of Hound's looming presence behind them.
| 11 | Joshua Williamson | Andrea Milana | Lee Loughridge | September 17, 2025 |
Hound easily shrugs off the Vipers' attacks, noting that the Energon powering their weapons is impure and corrupted. Clutch and Risk grab some weapons and escape with a refueled Hound, leaving a bewildered Mercer behind, while the Baroness and Bludd knife fight in the pit. Bludd offers to spare her parents if she allows him to take her eye, confident that Cover Girl will not be able to find her way out of the labyrinthine sewer tunnels. However, she escapes just in time to stop Raptor from killing the Baroness' parents, and the Baroness stabs out Bludd's remaining eye. She leaves the blinded mercenary behind and regroups with Cover Girl on the Parisian rooftops, while Destro attempts to talk down the Commander in his laboratory. Both men acknowledge that they ultimately have different goals regarding Cobra's future and are keeping secrets from one another, with the Commander stating his belief that humanity must evolve beyond flesh and bone to survive the coming technological wars. Clutch, Risk, the Baroness, and Cover Girl all return to the Pit, leaving Duke none the wiser about their respective adventures. The Baroness and Cover Girl affirm their new friendship as Hawk tells Night Force to stand down and stop spying on her for the moment; instead, they are to sneak into Darklonia and rescue their next recruit – Jodie "Shooter" Craig.
| 12 | Joshua Williamson | Marco Foderà | Lee Loughridge | October 15, 2025 |
As Hawk assures a suspicious Duke that nothing is happening within G.I. Joe without his knowledge, Night Force prepares to assault a Darklonian labor camp to rescue Shooter. Within the prison, Shooter refuses to use her expert sniper skills for Darklon, the country's regent and prison commandant, who orders her beaten and sent back to her cell. She manages to break out just as Beach Head finds her, disrupting a rival prisoner's attempt to assassinate her, and the two Joes regroup with Flint and Lady Jaye to escape. As they leave, Shooter pulls off a near-impossible sniper shot to kill the rival prisoner. Meanwhile, the Commander and Destro welcome Major Bludd to Cobra with a new pair of bionic eyes, restoring his sight. Mercer pulls Destro aside to inform him about the Joes working with Hound; rather than attack the Commander directly and upset the balance of power within Cobra, Destro decides to send the Dreadnoks to kill him instead.
==== Volume 3: "Dreadnok War" ====
| 13 | Joshua Williamson | Tom Reilly | Jordie Bellaire | November 5, 2025 |
The captive Dr. Laszlo Vandermeer informs the Commander that they have exhausted Cobra's initial supply of Energon within the Florida swamps. He orders their allies sent out to excavate smaller deposits around the world and takes Ripper to personally investigate a unique, pulsating Energon signal located in the Chihuahuan Desert. G.I. Joe also picks up the signal; with most of the team unavailable investigating the recent destruction of Chicago, (Note: As depicted in Transformers #23 and #24.) Duke agrees to follow up on the anomaly while visiting Frosting's grave in Texas. He discovers Cobra already excavating the site, where Ripper uncovers a planted beacon replicating the Energon signature. The site explodes as Ripper turns on the Commander, killing the Cobra Troopers and destroying his mechanical hand. Duke enters the fray and saves the Commander, but quickly captures him to learn more about Energon and the transforming robots. The two escape together as the Dreadnoks arrive to begin the chase, while Destro takes command of Cobra.
| 14 | Joshua Williamson | Tom Reilly | Jordie Bellaire | October 15, 2025 |
Destro begins offering Cobra's services to the highest bidder among his underworld contacts, to the confusion and concern of the other officers, while Duke and the Commander flee from the Dreadnoks. Outnumbered, outgunned, and with their communications blocked, Duke reluctantly frees the Commander and agrees to work together to escape the desert. Buzzer sabotages their Jeep with his arm-mounted chainsaw, but the two parkour across and through the Dreadnok convoy until they commandeer another truck. They lure their enemies into a canyon and collapse it, scattering the Dreadnoks but destroying their truck. After learning from Clutch that G.I. Joe is all out on missions, a frustrated Hawk departs for the CIA's headquarters in Langley to review intelligence on Destro's takeover of Cobra with General Flagg. Meanwhile, Duke and the Commander wander into an abandoned town and begin searching for a working vehicle or landline signal; the Commander discovers a drove of pigs inside one decrepit house and is suddenly taken out by a massive sledgehammer. As the remaining Dreadnoks converge on the town, Duke is cornered by Road Pig.
| 15 | Joshua Williamson | Tom Reilly | Jordie Bellaire | December 3, 2025 |
Road Pig quickly dispatches Duke and imprisons him in the house's attic with an unconscious and helmetless Commander. He leaves them to deal with the approaching Buzzer and Ripper while Hawk makes a detour to meet with Astoria. She brings him before Destro, who offers him Cobra's weapons and information in a potential truce against the menace of the transforming robots. In the attic, the Commander awakens and confides in Duke about his distaste for being human and his theft of the Dreadnoks' Energon. They are interrupted by the return of Road Pig, who has befriended Buzzer and Ripper after an initial fight and agreed to help the Dreadnoks. The Commander bites Buzzer's throat for commenting on his mutilated face; Road Pig takes the two captives outside, where Zarana arrives with the rest of the Dreadnoks, and Ripper returns the Commander's helmet. At the Pit, Clutch realizes that Duke is in trouble and leaves with Cover Girl to rescue him.
| 16 | Joshua Williamson | Tom Reilly | Jordie Bellaire | December 17, 2025 |
The Dreadnoks formally induct Road Pig into their gang with a party and prepare to burn their captives alive. Intrigued by Duke's continued insistence on sparing the Commander, Buzzer frees him and offers him a deal – if he can beat Buzzer in a fight, the Dreadnoks will let him interrogate the Commander before they kill him, and Torch lights the pyre to add a time limit. Despite learning that one of his Joes has secretly allied with a robot, Hawk rebuffs Destro's offer, takes out Mercer, and easily escapes. Buzzer prepares to kill Duke, but the rest of G.I. Joe arrives with enough weapons and vehicles to match the Dreadnoks. In the ensuing firefight, the Commander escapes from the pyre, the Baroness saves Duke, and Zarana and Zandar activate an Energon-powered device on their rebuilt Thunder Machine that generates an Energon lightning storm. The Joes regroup and prepare to retreat, but the injured Duke insists they go back for the Commander. The Dreadnoks begin searching for him, but the Commander incapacitates Buzzer and attacks the gang with his chainsaw.
| 17 | Joshua Williamson | Tom Reilly | Jordie Bellaire | January 14, 2026 |
Zarana, Zandar, and Ripper find that the Commander has captured Buzzer and massacred the other Dreadnoks. To their surprise, he commends their efforts and offers them a truce and employment as independent contractors for Cobra. The Commander also offers the Joes the chance to leave peacefully as thanks for their efforts to save him, but Duke refuses. The battle between the Joes and the Dreadnoks resumes fiercer than ever, leaving Clutch with no choice but to reveal his secret alliance with Hound. The Autobot transforms to the shock and horror of all and takes out the remaining Dreadnoks, but Destro arrives with Cobra reinforcements. The Commander escapes with Zarana, Zandar, Torch, Ripper, Buzzer, and Road Pig in tow; before the other Joes can react, a furious Duke knocks out Clutch and holds Hound at gunpoint. Meanwhile, the injured Hawk returns to the Pit and takes a secret call from Zarana, revealing himself to be a disguised and undercover Zartan.
| 18 | Joshua Williamson | Marco Foderà | Lee Loughridge | January 28, 2026 |
Zartan, with his Hawk disguise reapplied, contacts Flint to ask his opinion on another potential recruit for Night Force – Roadblock, a former heavy gunner who retired to his hometown of Biloxi, Mississippi and opened a successful local food truck. Roadblock is approached by Tomax and Xamot with an offer to lead their new Red Rockets food truck business. However, already aware that the twins use the brand for Cobra recruitment purposes, he turns them down. As Tomax and Xamot leave, a squadron of Crimson Guard troops crashes into the open-air food court and starts firing into the crowd. However, Roadblock single-handedly defeats them, steals their armored car's enormous roof-mounted machine gun, and catches up with Tomax and Xamot. He destroys their car with his food truck and the machine gun, and the twins flee with the remaining Crimson Guards. Roadblock returns to the food court to find that Night Force helped repair the damage in his absence, and he agrees to speak with them. Meanwhile, back at Cobra headquarters, the Commander thanks Destro for coming to his assistance, but secretly confirms his treachery through a recording system in Major Bludd's cybernetic eyes.
==== Volume 4: "The Hunt for Energon" ====
| 19 | Joshua Williamson | Andrea Milana | Lee Loughridge | February 18, 2026 |
As Zartan secretly compiles information on Energon from G.I. Joe and Cobra's databases, the other Joes try to defuse the standoff between Duke and Hound. Clutch tries to vouch for Hound's integrity, but Duke places the Autobot under arrest, and everyone returns to the Pit. Hound willingly accepts containment and tells Duke about Starscream, the war between the Autobots and Decepticons, and his current objective to fix his transponder and reconnect with the other Autobots active on Earth. Although still suspicious, Duke reluctantly agrees to trust Clutch and help Hound. The other Joes are immediately assigned new missions by "Hawk" – Cover Girl is to connect with Snow Job for more information, while Stalker, Baroness, and Risk are sent to investigate Energon readings in the barren country of Badhikistan. Meanwhile, a government agent attends an auto racing event to secretly warn Matt Trakker about the escape of his old Shadow Watch boss Miles Mayhem. (Note: As depicted in Transformers #28.) Suddenly, Scrap-Iron bursts onto the track, kills the agent, and informs Trakker he has come to collect Mayhem's bounty on his head.
| 20 | Joshua Williamson | Andrea Milana | Lee Loughridge | March 18, 2026 |
Trakker escapes with Scrap-Iron in hot pursuit, but the Cobra mercenary is driven away by Duke, Clutch, and Hound. Although Trakker is furious at being discovered, he repairs Hound's transponder before leaving again. Hound successfully arranges a meeting between Duke and his leader, Optimus Prime; however, he is shocked to discover that Optimus has abdicated the title of Prime and sent the Matrix of Leadership back to Cybertron with the Autobots' new leader, Elita Prime. (Note: As depicted in Transformers #30.) Duke is similarly shocked to learn that Starscream is dead. (Note: As depicted in Transformers #24.) He admits the toll that his quest for revenge against Starscream and other Cybertronians on Earth has taken on him to Optimus, and the two connect over shared burdens of leadership and war. Eventually, they agree to an informal alliance between the Joes and the Autobots on their respective missions to defeat Cobra and the Decepticons. Optimus allows Hound to stay with the Joes, and Duke and Clutch agree to keep the meeting secret from the other Joes. Meanwhile, Cover Girl meets with Snow Job, who fills her in on the undercover agent Scarlett's infiltration of the Arashikage ninja clan (Note: As depicted in Scarlett #1–5.) and learns their new orders – extract Scarlett by any means necessary.
| 21 (Note: Aside from Snow Job's opening and closing narration, this issue contains no spoken dialogue in reference to G.I. Joe: A Real American Hero issue #21.) | Joshua Williamson | Tom Reilly | Lee Loughridge | April 15, 2026 |
As Snow Job, Cover Girl, and Frostbite approach the mountainous Arashikage stronghold, Scarlett sends them a secure message updating her status but refusing to leave without Jinx. Jinx catches her on the rooftop, but a squadron of Cobra attack helicopters suddenly appears and attacks the monastery. Cobra Commander leads a horde of Cobra Troopers through the compound, slaughtering dozens of Arashikage ninjas; Scarlett, Jinx, and Storm Shadow kill many Troopers in turn, but they fail to stop the Commander from gaining access to the innermost sanctum and shooting the Hard Master. Before he can take the Energon sword, the three defenders arrive and kill nearly all of the remaining Cobra forces. However, the last Cobra Valkyrie claims the sword and saves the Commander from Storm Shadow. She remotely fires a missile from one of the helicopters that destroys the monastery, and she and the Commander escape with the sword. A distraught Scarlett is dragged away from the scene by the three Joes, and the Hard Master emerges from the monastery's wreckage to find Storm Shadow holding an injured Jinx.
| 22 | Joshua Williamson | Andrea Milana | Lee Loughridge | May 20, 2026 |
The Commander orders Destro to personally investigate and collect an Energon deposit; meanwhile, Risk awakens from a nightmare – remembering a hostage situation in a hotel when his poor tactical predictions resulted in the deaths of his squad – to find that he, Baroness, and Stalker have arrived in Badhikistan. The Joes find that the target city was completely abandoned due to it being supposedly haunted, and encounter Destro, Mercer, and Astoria while pursuing a strange glowing creature. Although Destro proposes an alliance to continue investigating the creature, a spooked Mercer accidentally initiates a firefight between the Joes and Cobras. However, everyone is dragged away by sets of glowing green tentacles controlled by Crystal Ball, whose illusion-creating D.I.R.E. Tech has been empowered and upgraded by Energon to bring its victims' worst fears to life. Risk pursues the abducted Mercer deeper into an abandoned building, only to find himself back in the hotel and confronted by the reanimated corpses of his dead squad.
| 23 | Joshua Williamson | Andrea Milana | Lee Loughridge | June 17, 2026 |
Risk manages to fight off the D.I.R.E. constructs, and Crystal Ball changes the illusion to mimic his family estate in response. Baroness encounters Destro in the tunnels beneath the compound after escaping the tentacles, but they agree to a temporary truce while looking for their allies. Risk is confronted with a monstrous vision of his parents berating him before the illusion shifts again into a cage match against the real Mercer. Baroness and Destro discover Crystal Ball's stockpile of Energon powering the D.I.R.E. Tech, as well as Stalker and Astoria being tortured by a strange machine. While fighting one another, Mercer encourages Risk to take control of his fears, and he manages to shift the illusion to the aftermath of the hotel attack – a memory of clinging to life in a hospital, fully aware of the consequences of his failure. Before they can escape, however, Mercer is ensnared by a glowing green snake as Crystal Ball confronts Risk to defend his Energon.
| 24 | Joshua Williamson | Andrea Milana | Lee Loughridge | July 15, 2026 |
Crystal Ball reveals that he was once a U.S. military interrogator who fled to Badhikistan after someone attempted to steal his experimental mind-reading technology, which he further upgraded into the D.I.R.E. Tech using Energon. As he summons a zombified apparition of Risk, Destro suggests destroying the Energon stockpile to deactivate the machine and save Stalker and Astoria. Baroness reluctantly agrees to his plan as a horde of D.I.R.E. constructs attacks them, and Destro detonates the Energon. Risk overcomes his mirror image as Crystal Ball's constructs fade away, and he takes both Crystal Ball and Mercer into custody. After Baroness lets Destro and Astoria escape, the Cobra agents return to Springfield with some of the Energon and D.I.R.E. Tech, and a pleased Commander later asks the Valkyrie for a sacrifice. Meanwhile, at the Pit, a suspicious Baroness notes "Hawk's" absence as he interrogates Crystal Ball for information on more Energon. However, his disguise fails, and Crystal Ball identifies him as both Zartan and the person who had previously tried to steal his technology; Baroness enters the room just as Zartan kills him.
==== Volume 5: "Night Force" ====
| 2026 Special | Joshua Williamson | Tom Reilly | Lee Loughridge | May 2, 2026 |
Sometime in the past, Zartan spoke with the captive Hawk about how the world's technological improvements gradually rendered his old methods of disguise, mimicry, and subterfuge ineffective. However, once the Dreadnoks captured Dr. Laszlo Vandermeer to experiment on Energon for them, Zartan volunteered himself as a test subject. The resulting mixture of Energon, synthetic skin, and nanotechnology embedded directly into Zartan's skin allowed him to shapeshift into anyone he chose; however, the false skin was temporary, and Zartan was rendered dependent on a steady stream of Energon to survive. He kidnapped Hawk sometime during the formation of G.I. Joe in a bid to take advantage of the organization's resources, and gloats about how his knowledge of Hawk and command of the special mission forces he commissioned will ensure his own survival. After transforming into Hawk, Zartan locks the real colonel away in a vault and leaves.
| 25 | Joshua Williamson | Tom Reilly Andrea Milana | Lee Loughridge | August 19, 2026 |
As Night Force – Flint, Lady Jaye, Beach Head, Shooter, and Roadblock – train with a horde of recommissioned S.N.A.K.E. mechsuits, "Hawk" puts the Pit in lockdown and orders Baroness captured. She manages to evade the stunned Joes and escape as Zartan repairs his disguise with Energon lifted from Crystal Ball's body. In Springfield, the Commander introduces Destro to his newest servant – Major Medusa, the Valkyrie enhanced with D.I.R.E Tech abilities, while "Hawk" rages at a suspicious Duke's refusal to kill Baroness. A disguised Baroness attempts to flee on a private yacht but is ambushed by Night Force; before they can arrest her, G.I. Joe arrives as backup, and she jumps off the yacht to safety with Hound. In response, Flint calls in Night Force's secret weapon – G.I. B.A.T., the reprogrammed and refurbished B.A.T. previously appropriated by Beach Head.
| 26 | Joshua Williamson | Tom Reilly | Lee Loughridge | September 16, 2026 |
The Joes and Night Force duel one another as Hound, Clutch, and Baroness escape. Watching the battle on surveillance cameras, "Hawk" leaves to meet with Snow Job and a sullen Scarlett for information on the Arashikage's Energon sword, currently in Cobra Commander's possession as part of a test for Major Medusa. Her D.I.R.E. Tech abilities conjure an illusion of Golobulus, and the shaken Commander declares her ready for field duty. G.I. B.A.T. malfunctions while fighting Duke and nearly kills him, forcing Risk and Roadblock to try and stop it, while Shooter forces Hound to crash. However, the pursuing Flint and Lady Jaye are shocked to discover that "Baroness" was actually a disguised Cover Girl, while the real Baroness makes an underwater escape.
| 27 | Joshua Williamson | Tom Reilly | Lee Loughridge | October 21, 2026 |
Flint returns to the yacht with Jaye, Clutch, and Hound to deactivate G.I. B.A.T., then promises the Joes Duke will receive medical attention back at the Pit. Baroness contacts a mysterious benefactor for assistance as "Hawk" meets with General Flagg at the headquarters of his secret research organization, Shadow Watch, and shows him doctored footage of Baroness killing Crystal Ball. Flagg concludes that Baroness is after the Mobile Command Center (M.C.C.) – a top-secret roving stockpile of Energon and alien technology – while Night Force imprisons the Joes in the Pit, leaves Duke in the care of Doc, and reassembles with Scarlett and Snow Job. "Hawk" orders them to split up and search for both Baroness and the M.C.C., and dismisses Flint's reservations about the G.I. B.A.T.'s malfunction. As a wary Flint asks Scarlett to monitor Cobra for signs of Baroness, Zartan orders Zarana and Zandar to engineer a diversion to draw both Cobra and Night Force away from the M.C.C.'s Energon. Meanwhile, Baroness arrives at an abandoned storehouse in Denver, Colorado, and is ambushed by the real Hawk, crazed and weakened from his imprisonment.
| 28 | Joshua Williamson | Tom Reilly | Lee Loughridge | November 18, 2026 |
After Hawk collects himself, he tells Baroness about Zartan's shapeshifting abilities and deduces his next target is the M.C.C.'s Energon. Both Night Force and the captured Joes accompany "Hawk" to meet the M.C.C., deepening both teams' suspicions of him, and the captured Mercer confirms to Scarlett that Baroness is not with Cobra. As Destro confronts the Commander with the remains of the Cobra-La spy, the Dreadnoks fail to arrive, forcing a weakened Zartan to create his own diversion. He releases the Joes' restraints, sets the G.I. B.A.T. against Hound, and kills the M.C.C.'s crew; however, Baroness and Hawk arrive before he can escape with the Energon. As Hawk verifies his identity to Flint, an enraged Zartan overdoses on the Energon's power to kill Baroness.

== Accolades ==
| Year | Award | Category | Nominee | Comic | Result | Ref. |
|---|---|---|---|---|---|---|
| 2024 | ComicBook.com Golden Issue Awards | Best Colorirst | Jordie Bellaire | G.I. Joe | Nominated | |
| 2025 | Eisner Awards | Best Coloring | Jordie Bellaire | Duke, G.I. Joe | Won | |
| 2025 | Eisner Awards | Best Writer | Kelly Thompson | Scarlett | Nominated | |

== Collected editions ==
| Title | Material collected | Pages | Publication date | ISBN |
Trade paperback
| Duke, Volume 1: Knowing is Half the Battle | Duke #1–5; Energon Universe 2024 Special (G.I. Joe story) | 112 | June 4, 2024 | ISBN 978-1534398160 |
| Cobra Commander, Volume 1: Determined to Rule the World | Cobra Commander #1–5 | 112 | June 11, 2024 | ISBN 978-1534398153 |
| Scarlett, Volume 1: Special Mission | Scarlett #1–5 | 120 | November 5, 2024 | ISBN 978-1534329553 |
| Destro, Volume 1: The Enemy | Destro #1–5 | 120 | November 19, 2024 | ISBN 978-1534357686 |
| G.I. Joe, Volume 1: The Cobra Strikes! | G.I. Joe #1–6 | 160 | June 17, 2025 | ISBN 978-1534328075 |
| G.I. Joe, Volume 2: Bludd's Revenge | G.I. Joe #7–12; Energon Universe 2025 Special (G.I. Joe story) | 128 | November 18, 2025 | ISBN 978-1534329904 |
| G.I. Joe, Volume 3: Dreadnok War | G.I. Joe #13–18 | 128 | March 13, 2026 | ISBN 978-1534333451 |
| G.I. Joe, Volume 4: The Hunt for Energon | G.I. Joe #19-24 | 128 | September 29, 2026 | ISBN 978-1534330405 |
| G.I. Joe, Volume 5: Night Force | G.I. Joe #25-30; Energon Universe 2026 Special (G.I. Joe story) | 144 | April 13, 2027 | ISBN 978-1534357532 |
Deluxe
| Codename: G.I. Joe: Deluxe Edition, Book 1 | Duke #1–5; Cobra Commander #1–5; Energon Universe 2024 Special (G.I. Joe story) | 256 | June 24, 2025 | ISBN 978-1534328228 |
| Codename: G.I. Joe: Deluxe Edition, Book 2 | Scarlett #1–5; Destro #1–5 | 256 | October 7, 2025 | ISBN 978-1534332546 |
| G.I. Joe: Deluxe Edition, Book 1 | G.I. Joe #1–12; Energon Universe 2025 Special (G.I. Joe story) | 288 | June 3, 2026 | ISBN 978-1534334526 |
| G.I. Joe: Deluxe Edition, Book 1 | G.I. Joe #1–12; Energon Universe 2025 Special (G.I. Joe story) | 288 | June 3, 2026 | ISBN 978-1534334526 |
| G.I. Joe: Deluxe Edition, Book 2 | G.I. Joe #13-24; Energon Universe 2026 Special (G.I. Joe story) | 304 | July. 13, 2027 | ISBN 978-1534362994 |

== See also ==
- Energon Universe (comics)
- G.I. Joe (Skybound Entertainment)
- G.I. Joe: A Real American Hero (Skybound Entertainment)
