= Flag carrier (disambiguation) =

A flag carrier is a transportation company, such as a shipping or airline company, that is registered in a given state.

Flag carrier may also refer to:

- Standard-bearer, a person (soldier or civilian) who bears an emblem called an ensign or standard
- A person carrying a heraldic standard or flag, usually at sporting events and parades, previously on the battlefield
- A strong supporter of a cause, or perhaps the strongest, most visible and most vocal supporter of said cause. Example: "Bill was the flag carrier of the movement to improve inner city education."

== See also ==
- Flagship
- USS Flagg carrier (toy aircraft carrier)
