= G.I. Joe: A Real American Hero (video game) =

1985 video game

- Developer: Epyx
- Publisher: Epyx
- Platforms: Apple II, Commodore 64
- Release: NA: 1985; EU: 1985
- Genre: Shoot 'em up
- Modes: Single-player, multiplayer

G. I. Joe: A Real American Hero is a shoot 'em up video game released in 1985. It was developed and published by Epyx for the Apple II and Commodore 64.

== Gameplay ==
At the beginning of the game the player selects a one player or two player game. The objective as one of the members of the G.I. Joe team is to eliminate any threats from Cobra and to capture eight Cobra operatives. The game cannot be completed if too many members of either side are placed in jail, other members are released to perpetuate the game.

Two modes of play are used: overhead vehicular combat sections, where the player controls a member of the G.I. Joe Special Forces, and one-on-one fights with Cobra operatives. There are different geographical locations, such as woods, desert and arctic tundra.

In the overhead vehicular combat portions of the game, the player selects a vehicle from the G.I. Joe series, choosing from the Dragonfly helicopter, Skystriker jet, M.O.B.A.T. tank, or V.A.M.P. jeep. The player would then play as the vehicles' respecting driver - Ace, Wild Bill, Steeler, or Clutch.

The one-on-one melee battle portion of the game features twelve available characters from the G.I. Joe team: Duke, Scarlett, Recondo, Torpedo, Snake Eyes, Roadblock, Spirit, Zap, Gung-Ho, Snow Job, Blowtorch, and Stalker. The Joes face off against eight Cobras: Destro, the Baroness, Zartan (who takes the form of a Joe character), Firefly, Cobra Commander, Storm Shadow, Major Bludd, and Scrap-Iron. Each playable character has advantages and disadvantages, such as faster-moving characters having less-powerful weapons. There are additional elements in the melee levels that can impede or harm the characters, including various environmental obstacles and non-playable vehicles/automated weapons that shoot at the characters.

== Development ==
Epyx was a major supporter of the Commodore 64 as a gaming platform, with licensed games such as G.I. Joe as an example. The game was designed by Ray Carpenter and Jeff Johannigman, with graphics by Pam Carpenter and music by Bob Vieira.

== See also ==
- Action Force (video game)
