= Gnawgahyde =

G.I. Joe character

- G.I. Joe character
- Gnawgahyde as seen in the DiC G.I. Joe cartoon.
- First appearance: 1989
- Voiced by: Ian James Corlett

In-universe information
- Affiliation: Cobra
- Specialty: Poacher
- Subgroups: Dreadnoks

Gnawgahyde is a fictional character from the G.I. Joe: A Real American Hero toyline, comic books and animated series of the 1980s. He is affiliated with Cobra as the Dreadnoks' poacher and debuted in 1989.

== Profile ==
Gnawgahyde is an aggressive hunter, who considers all animals to be lesser life-forms, suitable for skinning, eating, or stuffing. His pet warthog Clyde, is somehow an exception to this viewpoint. Gnawgahyde believes in living off the land, and regards the falseness of civilization as a sign of weakness. Therefore, he refuses to use deodorants or cosmetics of any kind, and will not eat processed food, or wear synthetic fibers. This is also due to the belief that such practices would warn the animal kingdom of his murderous presence. Gnawgahyde was chased out of Africa by his fellow poachers for various grievances including cheating at card games, having a bad odor, and his obnoxious personality. He was surviving on the money he earned from being a freelance fur thief, until the Dreadnoks met him at an all-night donut and grape soda shoppe and recruited him.

== Toys ==
Gnawgahyde was first released as an action figure in 1989. The wild boar only came with the figure.

== Devil's Due comics ==
Gnawgahyde makes several appearances in the Devil's Due G.I. Joe series of books. He appears in two flashback issues focusing on the Dreadnoks. Gnawgahyde, Zanzibar and Monkeywrench supervise recruiting Zanya and Kevin Schulte from a fighting ring to Dreadnok training missions. One of the missions involves killing several gang members who will not properly acknowledge they are doing business on Dreadnok territory.

Gnawgahyde is sent with newer Dreadnoks when Tomax and Xamot decide to physically destroy the evidence of a money laundering scheme, which involves a television studio. His team includes the diminutive Rugrat, the female Heart-Wrencher and the Dreadnok mechanic Burn-Out. The last man, eager to break things instead of fix them, starts the action early by interrupting the current program, a cooking show. Coincidentally, this is hosted by G.I. Joe member Roadblock. The soldier and his co-host defeat the Dreadnoks in hand-to-hand combat. The cooking program becomes a rousing success due to the recorded footage.

When the second Cobra civil war erupts, the Dreadnoks are recruited to fight with Cobra Commander against 'The Coil', the private army amassed by Serpentor. Gnawgahyde is seen as one of the many Dreadnoks sent to the battle, which takes places on Cobra Island. He is viewing the loading of the Dreadnok transport, the 'Thunder Machine'.

Gnawgahyde is later listed as "unknown" in the G.I. Joe Threat Index. This is a reference to the file card of the Dreadnok Crusher, where its states that Gnawgahyde went missing after going on a trip with the new Dreadnok.

== Animated series ==
=== DiC Entertainment ===
Gnawgahyde appeared in the DiC G.I. Joe animated series, voiced by Ian James Corlett. He is in the following episodes:

- Operation Dragonfire parts 1–4
- Cold Shoulder
- United We Stand
- Granny Dearest
- The Nozone Conspiracy
- I Found You...Evy
- The Mind Mangler
- Victory at Volcania I–II
- Pigskin Commandos
