= Clutch (G.I. Joe) =

- G.I. Joe character
- First appearance: G.I. Joe: A Real American Hero Issue #1 (June 1982)
- Voiced by: Michael Bell

In-universe information
- Affiliation: G.I. Joe
- Specialty: Driver
- File name: Steinberg, Lance J.
- Birth place: Asbury Park, NJ
- SN: RA757340802
- Rank: E-4 (Corporal) (1982); E-5 (Sergeant) (2007)
- Primary MOS: Transportation
- Secondary MOS: Infantry
- Subgroups: Mega Marines

Clutch is a fictional character from the G.I. Joe: A Real American Hero toyline, comic books and animated series. He is one of the G.I. Joe Team's motor vehicle drivers and debuted in 1982.

== Profile ==
His real name is Lance J. Steinberg, and his rank is that of Corporal E-4. His primary military specialty is transportation and his secondary military specialty is infantry. Clutch was born in Asbury Park, New Jersey. Clutch was a mechanic and was heavily involved in racing street machines prior to enlistment. He graduated in Advanced Infantry Training; Covert Ops School; Executive Bodyguard School; Ranger School. He is a qualified expert with the M14, M16, M1911A1, M3A1, M79 and M60.

Clutch is known as a wild card who takes very little seriously. His crude behavior has gotten him into trouble with his teammate Scarlett on several occasions, causing her to think of him as a chauvinist pig. This hasn't affected his reliability on the battlefield, but has earned him a reputation for having manners that leave a lot to be desired. While the G.I. Joe team was temporarily disbanded, Clutch used his skills as a mechanic on the Indy racing circuit, earning him a record number of wins for his drivers.

== Toys ==
Clutch was first released as an action figure in 1982, packaged with the V.A.M.P. battle jeep. All of the original sixteen figures from 1982 were released with "straight arms." The same figure was re-released in 1983 with "swivel-arm battle grip", which made it easier for figures to hold their rifles and accessories. In 1984, a second action figure with a tan uniform was released, and was packaged with the V.A.M.P. Mark II vehicle. The character was also released as a member of the Mega Marines subgroup in 1993, as the driver of the "Monster Blaster A.P.C.", though the figure was sold separately from the vehicle.

The 2003 edition of his action figure was renamed as Double Clutch. Later figures reverted to the original name.

== Comics ==
=== Marvel Comics ===
Clutch first appeared in G.I. Joe: A Real American Hero #1 (June 1982), in the Marvel Comics licensed comic book. An unabashed skirt chaser, Clutch comes across to female Joe members such as Scarlett and Cover Girl as an oversexed chauvinist, and he does not give them much reason to think otherwise. Constantly hitting on any woman who comes into his line of sight, at one point Clutch actually suggests putting up Cover Girl and Scarlett as a mud wrestling pair. Even though he is a blatantly chauvinistic jerk, he is also a good driver and a good soldier who does his job when necessary. As the series goes on, his chauvinistic attitude is downplayed. Unlike his action figure, Clutch does not have a full beard but rather a five o'clock shadow.

Clutch assists Scarlett in taking a diplomat to peace talks concerning the fictional country of Al-Awai. They survive many Cobra battles on the way. The diplomat himself is a deep-cover Cobra officer, sent to kill his counterpart. The Joe duo actually fail in their mission; however, the ambassador had thought to wear protection and survived the shooting.

In G.I. Joe issue #18, Clutch drives his VAMP vehicle into a Cobra military convoy, hiding in the surrounding Libyan desert dust. Working with Hawk and other Joes, Breaker helps capture an important Cobra agent, Scar-Face, out of the back of a Cobra tank. This is intended by Cobra, however, as having Scar-Face in the custody of the Joe team is vital part of Cobra's plans.

In #19, back home at the Pit, Clutch is sent on a recon mission with Breaker. They take Scar-Face and Major Bludd, another prisoner, with them, to prevent the Cobras from overhearing vital G.I. Joe tactics. Their vehicle is spotted by advancing Cobra forces and all four are almost slain by Cobra. Clutch's driving gets them safely inside the base just before the Cobra missiles strike.

The next issue features Clutch taking some time off to visit old friends. He finds out that one of them is involved with a Cobra weapons lab looking to create more efficient jetpacks. Clutch calls in Joe aid and the Cobra forces are neutralized.

Later, Clutch is featured in G.I. Joe: Special Missions #2. He and fellow Joes Recondo and Roadblock are sent to track down a Nazi war criminal who is hiding in Brazil. The mission is complicated by the surprise arrival of an Israeli military team with interests in the same criminal, and one learns that Clutch's Jewish grandmother had horrific personal experiences with Nazis. Clutch is complicit with trickery which leaves the Nazi to be killed by his own followers.

Clutch is featured in a multi-issue storyline with his good friend, Rock 'n Roll. While on a vacation/road trip, the two discover the Cobra-owned town of Broca Beach. It used to be Clutch's hometown, until it was bought out and sanitized and renamed They are captured by the Dreadnoks, specifically, the multi-personality thug, Road Pig. Brainwashed as ticking time bombs, they later meet up with Joe forces, unaware that they ever have been captured. Later, two lost young girls end up being escorted to Joe base and the pair are assigned to supervise them. A Cobra Python Patrol attack activates the pair's brainwashing and they threaten the girls. It is all they do, as the inherent decency in the two prevent them from harming innocent people. The brainwashing snaps and they pass out.

Clutch would team up with Rock 'n Roll again, in Canada. They assist Canadian police forces in shutting down a warehouse full of Cobra forces and Terror Drome parts. As it was Canadian territory, the Joes had to receive explicit permission before acting, but this was given freely, as the Canadian policemen were hiding from the same Cobra gunfire the Joes were.

Clutch's last appearance in the Marvel run of G.I. Joe was issue #145.

=== Devil's Due ===
He was not seen again until issue #8 of the Image comics version of G.I. Joe. He spent the time in between as a mechanic for the Indy League Racing Circuit. He also worked at a Philadelphia Naval Base which was thought to be shut down, but still carried out top secret missions. Despite not being an official Joe member, he assists several Joes when Storm Shadow invades the base. In the 'Declassified' series set in the Joe's first year, Clutch works in a bodyguard position for General Hawk.

=== America's Elite ===
Clutch returns to active duty when the team is reorganized. He and Rock'N'Roll investigate a terrorist bombing in Turkey; he is warned by allies in the area that this bombing alone could lead to World War 3.

=== IDW ===
In this continuation of the Marvel continuity, Clutch is seeing operating a drone plane to provide support for four others Joes on a hostage rescue mission.

== Animated series ==
=== Sunbow ===
He appeared in G.I. Joe TV series in both the MASS Device and Revenge of Cobra miniseries. Clutch was voiced by Michael Bell. This is a list of all his appearances in the cartoon:

- A Real American Hero (Parts I, III, IV & V),
- The Revenge Of Cobra (Parts I, II, IV, & V),
- The Pyramid Of Darkness (Parts I & V),
- Twenty Questions (brief),
- The Synthoid Conspiracy (Parts I & II),
- Where The Reptiles Roam (brief),
- Spell Of The Siren,
- Cobra Quake,
- Worlds Without End (Parts I & II),
- The Traitor (Parts I & II),

He was written out by being placed in an alternate dimension, along with Steeler and Grunt, where G.I. Joe had lost and Cobra ruled the world (though he still appeared regularly in the comic book series written by Larry Hama).

==== G.I. Joe: The Movie ====
Clutch appeared in the opening sequence of G.I. Joe: The Movie.

== Live action film ==
Clutch appears in the film G.I. Joe: Retaliation, portrayed by stuntman Jim Palmer in a non-speaking role. However, he does have dialogue in the extended cut on Blu-ray. He is killed when Zartan, disguised as the president, sends an air strike at the Joe's base.

== Video games ==
Clutch is one of the featured characters in the 1985 G.I. Joe: A Real American Hero computer game.

== Other works ==
Clutch has a brief mention in the non-fiction novel 'Paradise Of Bombs'.
