= Recondo (G.I. Joe) =

Character in G.I. Joe

- G.I. Joe character
- Recondo as seen in the Sunbow/Marvel G.I. Joe animated series.
- First appearance: 1984
- Voiced by: Bill Morey

In-universe information
- Affiliation: G.I. Joe
- Specialty: Jungle Trooper
- File name: LeClaire, Daniel M.
- Birth place: Wheaton, Wisconsin
- SN: 158-23-0074
- Rank: E-4 (Corporal); E-7 (Sergeant First Class) (Devil's Due comics)
- Primary MOS: Infantry
- Secondary MOS: Intelligence
- Subgroups: Tiger Force

Recondo is a fictional character from the G.I. Joe: A Real American Hero toyline, comic books and animated series. He is the G.I. Joe Team's original jungle trooper, and debuted in 1984.

== Profile ==
His real name is Daniel M. LeClaire, and his rank is that of corporal E-4. Recondo was born in Wheaton, Wisconsin.

Recondo's primary military specialty is infantry and his secondary military specialty is intelligence. He was a Cadre member at the Jungle Warfare Training Center. He is also a qualified helicopter pilot. Recondo hates cold weather, and loves being in the jungle. He is a qualified expert with the M-16, Swedish K, grease gun, M-1911A1 Auto Pistol and M-79 grenade launcher.

== Toys ==
Recondo was first released as an action figure in 1984.

The figure was repainted and released as part of the Tiger Force line in 1988, packaged with the "Tiger Fly" covert assault helicopter. The file card for this figure reveals Recondo has extensive experience with helicopters.

== Comics ==
=== Marvel Comics ===
In the Marvel Comics G.I. Joe series, he first appeared in G.I. Joe: A Real American Hero #32 (February 1985), where he has nothing more difficult to deal with than the chaos involving a party celebrating the refurbishment of G.I. Joe headquarters. He is soon assigned to the jungles of the fictional country of Sierra Gordo, whose government had fallen apart after the Joes chased Cobra out. Gung-Ho, Stalker, Ripcord and Roadblock arrive to rescue Dr. Adele Burkhardt, a peace activist who was the sole survivor of a goodwill mission. There is a tense stand-off because the Joes aren't quite familiar with Recondo but this ends peacefully. During the mission, Russian snipers shoot and kill three of Recondo's native Tucaro allies. In return, Recondo hunts and kills the snipers and offers their rifles to the raging river, a process that respects the beliefs of the Tucaros. Recondo then assists in a sea battle off the coast of Cobra Island.

Recondo is badly wounded in the battle of Springfield but recovers.

Recondo is featured in the second issue of the spin-off series G.I. Joe Special Missions. Along with Dial-Tone, Clutch and Roadblock, he is sent to a South American jungle to gain needed, life-saving knowledge out of a suspected Nazi war criminal. The group comes into conflict with an Israeli commando team looking to kill the man they need to talk to.

Recondo is seen as part of a multi-vehicle secondary assault team during the Cobra Island civil war storyline.

=== Devil's Due ===
In the later Devil's Due series, G.I. Joe America's Elite, the Cobra operative Major Bludd claims to have killed Recondo. This claim is untrue, as Recondo had survived his confrontation with Major Bludd, partly due to interference by his Tucaro allies. Only the Joe member Sparks knows this is true: Recondo wishes to remain officially dead so he can secretly work against Cobra.

=== Cyclone Comics ===
In 1988-1989, Australia's Cyclone Comics published a 4-issue run titled G.I. Joe Australia, reprinting stories from the Marvel series with additional Australian material featuring a G.I. Joe named "Digger," who appeared in narrative bookends to the reprinted American stories. Digger's visual appearance was adapted from Recondo, so when G.I. Joe Australia #2 reprinted the story from G.I. Joe Special Missions #2, Digger was substituted for Recondo with minimal change to the art and story.

== Animated series ==
=== Sunbow ===
Recondo first appeared in the Sunbow G.I. Joe animated series in the mini-series "The Revenge of Cobra", voiced by Bill Morey. He regularly appeared in the first season, and in the second season he is reduced to a background character.

Recondo had a major role in the episode "Jungle Trap", in which he is part of a group of Joes on a mission to escort the scientist Dr. Shakur. Dr. Shakur is captured by Cobra, but Recondo deduces the location of the base where Shakur is being held, leading to the Joes rescuing him.

==== G.I. Joe: The Movie ====
Recondo briefly appeared in the 1987 animated film G.I. Joe: The Movie. He is seen in battle and is also present when a critically injured Duke falls into a coma.

== Video games ==
Recondo is one of the featured characters in the 1985 G.I. Joe: A Real American Hero computer game.

He appears as a non-playable supporting character in the 2009 video game G.I. Joe: The Rise of Cobra, voiced by Brian Bloom.

== Books ==
He co-stars in the 'Find-Your-Fate' novel Operation: Tiger Strike.
