= Action Force (video game) =

1987 video game

- Developer: The Gang of Five
- Publisher: Virgin Games
- Designers: Martin Wheeler; Link Tomlin
- Platforms: ZX Spectrum, Commodore 64, Amstrad CPC
- Release: 1987
- Genres: Puzzle, shoot 'em up
- Mode: Single-player

Action Force: International Heroes is a video game released by Virgin Games in 1987 for the ZX Spectrum and Commodore 64, and in 1988 for the Amstrad CPC. The game is set in the world of the Action Force (G.I. Joe) toys by Hasbro. The ZX Spectrum version of the game differs notably from the Commodore and Amstrad versions.

== Gameplay ==
Cobra have launched a surprise attack on the island of Botsneda. In the panic of the evacuation, classified information has been left behind in the eastern sector. An Action Force team must cross to the eastern side of the island in a modified A.W.E. Striker to retrieve the data. Their path must be safely cleared of enemies and obstacles.

The player controls a helicopter which must clear the path for the Striker and its occupants across a dangerous landscape. Rivers may be crossed by picking up pontoon sections and moving them to create pontoon bridges.

=== ZX Spectrum ===
The Striker contains Flint, Lady Jaye and Quick Kick, while the player controls Snake Eyes, who is equipped with a helipack and an automatic rifle. The Striker will automatically stop when it meets an obstacle, and will begin moving again when the path is cleared. There are no enemy aircraft but missiles and aerial mines must be avoided or destroyed.

=== Commodore 64/Amstrad CPC ===
The Striker contains Lady Jaye and Crankcase, while the player controls Wild Bill and Flint in an XH-1 helicopter. The XH-1 is equipped with missiles and bombs. The Striker will not stop when it meets an obstacle and will crash if the path is not cleared. The player must fight off hostile Cobra aircraft.

== Sequel ==
Action Force II
- Developer: The Gang of Five
- Publisher: Virgin Games
- Designers: Martin Wheeler; Andy Green
- Platform: ZX Spectrum
- Release: 1988
- Genres: Puzzle, shoot 'em up
- Mode: Single-player

A sequel, Action Force II: International Heroes, was released by Virgin Games in 1988 for the ZX Spectrum home computer.

=== Gameplay ===
Cobra has taken a number of innocent citizens hostage and it is up to Action Force to rescue them. They are being held in separate groups atop various urban buildings. Each block must be scaled by Quick Kick while Airtight covers him from the helicopter.

As with Action Force, the player must shepherd a character across a dangerous environment, however the game is otherwise completely different.

The player controls the crosshairs of Airtight's weapon, and must shoot enemies that appear before they injure Quick Kick as he ascends the side of the building. Quick Kick also loses energy as the level progresses; it can be replenished by shooting the U.S. flags on the walls of some screens. When Quick Kick reaches the roof the hostages are released and make their way to the rescue helicopter.

At the end of each level Airtight may switch weapons; he can choose between a machine-gun, bazooka or bio-gun, each of which has different advantages and drawbacks.

Every two levels the player must defeat a tank by shooting it a certain number of times within a time-limit.

=== Background ===
Martin Wheeler, one of the developers said:

I think Action Force 2 was the game I was happiest with. We wrote it with instant arcade appeal in mind, deliberately playing on the tastes of the games reviewers who slated DD2. They gave it the 'Smash' we thought Dan Dare 2 had deserved.

== Reception ==
- Sinclair User on Action Force:

The programming was done by the same people who did Rebel for Virgin, and it shows. Rebel looked big, bold and sharp, and so does Action Force. It's one hell of a good game.

- Sinclair User on Action Force II:

Hey! This game is brilliant... After a bad patch Virgin seems to have regained its former glory. Dan Dare was brill, Dan Dare 2 was exceptional and Action Force 2, well it's transcended!"

- Your Sinclair on Action Force II:

Action Force 2 is full of wonderful little touches: bullet-holes appear in the brickwork, torches on the walls burn, your gunsight judders as you hold down the trigger. Quick-Kick expires convincingly if the enemy manages to shoot him or drop weights on his head. If you remember to shoot the dustbins, keep blasting the flags to restore energy, and keep your cool against the tank, the early levels are fairly straightforward. But as it gets harder and harder, Action Force 2 just gets better and better.
