= Major Bludd =

Character in G.I. Joe

- G.I. Joe character
- First appearance: 1983
- Voiced by: Michael Bell (Sunbow/Marvel); André Sogliuzzo (Renegades); Mark Oliver (G.I. Joe: Operation Blackout)

In-universe information
- Affiliation: Cobra
- Specialty: Mercenary
- File name: Bludd, Sebastian
- Birth place: Sydney, Australia
- Rank: O-4 (Major)
- Primary MOS: Terrorism and Assassination
- Secondary MOS: Weapons and Tactics
- Subgroups: Super Sonic Fighters, Python Patrol

Major Bludd (Sebastian Bludd) is a fictional character from the G.I. Joe: A Real American Hero toyline, comic books, and animated series. He is a mercenary working for the Cobra Organization.

== Profile ==
Born in Sydney, Australia, Sebastian Bludd was trained by the Australian Special Air Service, served with that regiment in Southeast Asia, left to join the French Foreign Legion and saw action in Algeria, all before becoming a mercenary. He worked as a military advisor in a number of hostile countries where he committed acts of terrorism against peaceful governments throughout Europe. He is wanted on three continents (especially Rhodesia, Libya) for numerous war crimes, and even a few crimes against humanity. Bludd has a tactical mind like a steel trap, and is proficient with all NATO and Warsaw Pact small arms. He has a weapons qualification of sharpshooter and is adept with plastic explosives, long-range sniper rifles, garrotes, blunt instruments, poisoned ice picks, Saturday night specials, and anything with spikes.

Major Bludd is also known for writing very bad poetry.

== Toys ==
Major Bludd first appeared in 1983.

A version of Major Bludd was released as part of the Super Sonic Fighters line in 1991. Another version of Major Bludd was released in 1994 as part of the Battle Corps line. The 2000 figure is a repaint of his Sonic Fighters uniform mostly brown, black and silver in some parts. The 2003 figure uses the 94 head and another figure mold in the Python Patrol color scheme. The 2005 JvC/ST/VvV update uses the Blackout mold, Firefly arms and a new head w/ removable helmet. The 2006 version is part of the 2006 Joe Con Mercenaries set. The first 25th/Modern Era Bludd figure uses the first 25th Zartan mold, the right arm that is reminiscent of the V1 figure. Later Modern Era versions have him in his true V1 mold and a cartoon version.

== Comics ==
=== Marvel Comics ===
Major Bludd's first appearance was in issue #15, in which Cobra Commander hires Bludd to kill Destro, fearing that Destro would try to usurp the commander's authority. The Baroness, who was in love with Destro, foils the attempt. Afterward, he makes an escape. Pursued by Grand Slam and Stalker, Bludd takes a bus and its passengers hostage. Grand Slam manages to get into the bus and subdue him. Taken to the Bethesda Naval Hospital for treatment, Bludd attempts to escape by taking a nurse hostage, but is apprehended by an injured Hawk and brought to Joe headquarters. In issue #19, he escapes during a Cobra attack on Joe Headquarters and leaves behind the Cobra Trooper known as Scar-Face. During the escape, he shoots and kills General Flagg, the Joe's original commanding officer. He remains in Cobra employment despite Destro's knowledge of his attempted murder. Bludd eventually leaves Cobra to resume his career as a mercenary. Bludd has no contact with Cobra for the next few years, except a brief period where he poses as Destro to infiltrate Destro's Scottish castle. Later, he is hired by a corrupt General to kill Snake Eyes, who is trying to rescue an American prisoner in a Borovian gulag, but chooses not to carry out the assassination after the American prisoner is killed.

=== America's Elite ===
In the series G.I. Joe: America's Elite, Major Bludd attempts to kill the Vice President of the United States. He is stopped by Storm Shadow, and during the battle his cybernetic hand is blown off.

Major Bludd returns, when his hideaway in Switzerland is found by the presumed dead Baroness. She enlists his help, promising him power and a chance to kill Joes.

Major Bludd journeys to Saudi Arabia, recruiting a local anti-West faction in an attack on an oil refinery. The Joes trail him and stop his assault. Major Bludd allows himself to be captured by Duke. During this incident, Major Bludd claims to have killed the G.I. Joe member Recondo.

Stalker and Flint escort Major Bludd to a prison in Greenland nicknamed "The Coffin", created specifically to house Cobra's elite operatives. He later escapes imprisonment during Tomax's raid on the facility. Major Bludd is approached by Zartan, who pays him to take his place, so the Dreadnok leader can payback Cobra Commander for having Monkeywrench killed. Major Bludd takes the money, but appears during the final battle in the Appalachian Mountains. He tries to kill Sparks, but is ironically knocked out by Recondo, who had faked his death to battle Cobra more efficiently. In the aftermath of the battle, Major Bludd is returned to The Coffin.

== Animated series ==
=== Sunbow ===
Major Bludd makes his debut in the first G.I. Joe miniseries as a Cobra Field Commander. He appeared frequently throughout the first season. Major Bludd is mainly loyal to Cobra Commander, who once also made a reference to Major Bludd being in charge of recruitment for Cobra. He was voiced by Michael Bell.

=== G.I. Joe: The Movie ===
Major Bludd appeared briefly in the beginning of G.I. Joe: The Movie, in the attack on the Statue of Liberty, just before his glider was shot down by the Joes. He then appears in the Cobra Terror Drome with the other members of the High Command, but is absent for the rest of the movie.

=== DiC series ===
Major Bludd is absent in the first DiC produced season of G.I. Joe, but appears in the second season. He once again serves as Cobra's primary field Commander, working alongside Cobra Commander and the Baroness. Whereas some characters had very different appearances and voices in the DiC series, Major Bludd is very accurate to his previous portrayal. He now wears a blue Cobra uniform, unlike his previously brown officer's outfit to match his toy counterpart.

=== Resolute ===
In the opening of the first episode of G.I. Joe: Resolute, Major Bludd's body is discovered at the Lincoln Memorial and is identified by Scarlett. It is later revealed that Cobra Commander had killed him for trying to usurp authority.

=== Renegades ===
Major Bludd is a hired assassin in G.I. Joe: Renegades. He first appeared in the episode "The Package", in which he was hired by Cobra to eliminate anti-Cobra blogger Alvin Kibbey. Kibbey is saved by the Joes, who are then added to Bludd's target list. Tracking them to a SSS mart warehouse (part of Cobra illegal weapons business), Bludd believes that he killed Kibbey when his knife hits his him in the back, unaware that the weapon only damaged the stolen Cobra scanner in Kibbey's backpack. He attempts to use a bazooka to destroy the fleeing Joes only to find that the Joes had wired the bazooka to a bomb in Cobra's warehouse. Bludd is hit by the blast, scarring his face and blinding him in his left eye. Calling and telling the Baroness that he completed his mission to kill Kibbey, Bludd tells her that he will kill the Joe for free.

In "Cousins", Major Bludd returns and attacks Roadblock and Heavy Duty at a cemetery following a funeral, causing Roadblock and Heavy Duty to be handcuffed to each other. Bludd ends up following them in a car chase which results in him blowing up a bridge. He then follows them into the swamp on a swamp boat. Major Bludd contacts Baroness, telling her that he requires a raise in the bounty while tracking Roadblock and Heavy Duty. Bludd catches up to Roadblock and Heavy Duty and traps them. He then proceeds to set a trap for the other Joes. Baroness and a group of Cobra soldiers then join him in the fight. When Major Bludd tries to fire on the Joes, he is attacked by an alligator and loses his right arm in the process.

== Video games ==
Major Bludd is one of the featured villains in the 1985 G.I. Joe: A Real American Hero computer game.

== Film ==
Major Bludd appears briefly in the 2013 live-action film G.I. Joe: Retaliation during the recapitulation of the events in the first film, G.I. Joe: The Rise of Cobra. Data sheets of several Joes and Cobra operatives appear onscreen, including that of Major Bludd's which includes a photograph of him.
