= List of G.I. Joe: A Real American Hero playsets and vehicles =

The G.I. Joe: A Real American Hero toyline was introduced by Hasbro in 1982, and lasted to 1994, producing well over 250 vehicles (i.e. in-universe are meant to move under their own power), and playsets (i.e. toys representing static bases of operation such as fortresses, or equipment such as artillery pieces). Many of these vehicles included action figures designed to be the driver/pilot of the vehicle. Other vehicles were sold separately, for use with any G.I. Joe character.

In the late 1980s, Toys "R" Us also produced several exclusive lines of G.I. Joe toys, which were repainted and recast versions of previously released toys.

== G.I. Joe vehicles with drivers ==
=== Arctic Blast ===
The Arctic Blast was first released in 1989, packaged with the driver Windchill. This cold-weather vehicle featured a progressive air suspension system, two "Chain Gang" 30mm Gatling guns, two 7.62mm double-barreled machine guns, and side-mounted surface missiles.

=== Avalanche ===
The Avalanche was first released in 1990, packaged with the driver Cold Front. It featured a digital ice mine deployer, a side-swipe missile-firing pulse cannon, six heat-seeking surface-to-air missiles, and a removable scout craft for arctic reconnaissance.

=== A.W.E. Striker ===
The A.W.E. (All-Weather/Environment) Striker was first released in 1985, packaged with the Crankcase action figure. It featured a removable engine, a 10-round 70mm launcher for projectiles, off-road tires and springing 4WD suspension. Its design was based on the Chenowth M1040/41 Fast Attack Vehicle first produced in 1982 though not fielded until 1991. In 1992, the cannon was replaced by a water-firing gun, and the vehicle was recast as the Eco-Striker, as part of the Eco-Warriors line.

=== Blockbuster ===
The Blockbuster was first released in 1994, packaged with the Battle Corps version of Windchill. The heavily armored vehicle featured a double-barreled pom-pom cannon, with a ten shot auto-feeding rocket chamber, an anti-aircraft gun, and a front-mounted Gatling gun.

=== Conquest X-30 ===
The Conquest X-30 super-sonic jet was first introduced in the 1986 run of the toyline, packaged with the Slip Stream action figure. The Conquest is an advanced forward-swept wing jet fighter, based on the real-life experimental Grumman X-29 aircraft. It is armed with a laser guidance system, twin 25 mm revolver cannons, and four "AIM-12 Light Sparrow" missiles. The Conquest X-30 carries "11k" (presumably 11,000 pounds) internal fuel, and two 350 gal. external fuel tanks. Hasbro marketed it as the Joe team's counterpart to Cobra's Night Raven.

It was recast in a red and black cross "Snake Skin" camouflage, and released as the Python Conquest in 1989, as part of the Python Patrol line. It was later released again as the Conquest X-30 in 1998, with a different color scheme, and bundled with a different character, fellow G.I. Joe pilot Ace. It was released once more in 2003, again with a different color scheme, and Slip Stream back as the pilot.

In the Marvel Comics G.I. Joe series, the Conquest first appeared in issue #54, where it squared off against the Cobra Firebat. It would not be until G.I. Joe: Special Missions issue #5 that it would fight against the Night Raven. The Conquest X-30 is featured heavily in the second season of the TV series, when it replaced the Skystriker as the Joe team's primary fighting aircraft.

=== Crossfire ===
The Crossfire was the first radio-controlled G.I. Joe vehicle. It was first released in 1987, packaged with the action figure Rumbler. The 4WD vehicle came with a control module and twin-lever joystick, and could be controlled from up to 70 feet away. It featured two "Live-Wire" Sam-19 missiles, "Pumper" 20mm cannons, and real rubber tires. The Crossfire was available in two different radio frequencies ("Alpha 27" or "Delta 49"), so that two vehicles could be operated in the same location.

=== Crusader Space Shuttle ===
The Crusader Space Shuttle is based on the design of the Defiant that was released two years earlier. In lieu of the robot arm, the Crusader comes with the Avenger Scout Craft, which was a one-person recon jet, similar to the drone that accompanied the Cobra Night Raven S³P. The Crusader also came with a repainted version of the Payload action figure.

=== Desert Fox ===
The Desert Fox 6WD desert jeep was first released in 1988, packaged with the driver Skidmark. It featured two "Scorpion" anti-tank missiles, wheels that were heat and puncture resistant, and a rear-mounted anti-aircraft cannon. In 1993, it was recast and released as the Dino-Hunter Jeep, as part of the Dino-Hunter Mission Playset, which also included repainted versions of the figures Ambush and Low-Light.

=== Dragonfly XH-1 ===
The Dragonfly XH-1 assault copter was first released in 1983, packaged with the action figure Wild Bill. Armed with four Sidewinder air-to-ground missiles, two Sidewinder H.E. missiles, and a dual M-34 grenade launcher/2mm Vulcan nose cannon, it became a trademark for the G.I. Joe Team. The toy's design is based upon the Bell AH-1 SuperCobra. The Dragonfly is featured in the 1985 G.I. Joe computer game. Wild Bill also pilots a Dragonfly in the C64/CPC version of the Action Force video game. It was repainted and released as the Tiger Force Tiger Fly in 1988.

=== Ghoststriker X-16 ===
The Ghoststriker X-16 was introduced in 1993, as the latest in the G.I. Joe Team's high-tech flight technology. Based on the F-16 Fighting Falcon, the jet featured two Sidewinder missiles, four Phoenix missiles, retractable landing gear, and an image projection unit built into the nosecone of the toy. When activated, it would project the illuminated image of an enemy jet on a wall, so that the toy could "fire a missile" at the image and neutralize it. The Ghoststriker came packaged with the Battle Corps version of Ace.

=== H.A.V.O.C. ===
The H.A.V.O.C. (Heavy Articulated Vehicle Ordnance Carrier) was introduced in 1986, and came packaged with the Cross-Country action figure. It was armed with dual recoilless cannons, and "Lancer" guided missiles. The rear of the vehicle opened to reveal a reinforced lift-off pad, and a one-man hover reconnaissance vehicle. Unlike much of the Joe team's vehicles and equipment up to that point, the H.A.V.O.C. was not based on any real-world vehicle, deployed or in development. It was repainted with chrome parts, and released as the Sky Patrol Sky H.A.V.O.C. in 1990.

=== Killer W.H.A.L.E. ===
The Killer W.H.A.L.E. (Warrior: Hovering Assault Launching Envoy) hovercraft was released in 1984. It came packaged with the Cutter action figure, and featured twin elevating cannons, two rotating machine guns, and six depth charges. The craft's four casters allow it to "hover" on a flat surface, and although not air-tight, the toy has positive buoyancy and is capable of floating on water. In the G.I. Joe: A Real American Hero comic book, the acronym stood for Water-borne Hovercraft Assault Landing: Experimental, and it first appeared in issue #28, when it participated in an assault on Zartan's lair in Florida's Okefenokee Swamp. It was recast in black and red, and released as the Night Force Night Striker in 1988.

=== Mauler M.B.T. ===
The Mauler M.B.T. (Manned Battle Tank) was released in 1985, as a replacement for the M.O.B.A.T. toy which was discontinued the same year. It was based on the AAI Corporation's prototype RDF/LT (Rapid Deployment Force / Light Tank) produced in 1980. It came packaged with the Heavy Metal action figure. Like the M.O.B.A.T., the Mauler incorporated a small DC electric motor, powered by 4xC batteries. However, the Mauler toy was only capable of going forward, albeit with two speeds, unlike the M.O.B.A.T. which could also reverse and turn. It was repainted and fitted with new parts in 1989, and released as the Slaughter's Marauders Equalizer.

=== Mean Dog ===
The Mean Dog 3-in-1 armored vehicle was first released in 1988, packaged with the driver Wild Card. It consisted of a main body with a tow hook and ten missiles, a removable M200 "Spitfire" 20mm cannon, and a fast-attack scout car with a .50 caliber machine gun.

=== M.O.B.A.T. ===
The M.O.B.A.T. (MOtorized BAttle Tank) was first released in 1982, packaged with the action figure Steeler. The design was based on the MBT-70, with an extendable 130mm main cannon, and a .50 caliber machine gun. "Motorized" refers to the fact that toy was actually propelled by a small 2xD battery powered electric motor that drove the tank's tracks, allowing the toy to move forward/reverse and turn under its own power; its movement was controlled by moving the tank commander's cupola on the top of the turret. In later years, Hasbro was able to sell thousands of M.O.B.A.T. toys to former Soviet children through its Indian joint venture, Funskool (India) Ltd.; the Russians ordered 100,000 units delivered instantly.

In the Marvel Comics G.I. Joe series, the M.O.B.A.T.'s most prominent appearances include the first issue, where it is part of a concentrated attack on a Cobra island fortress. Subsequently, the M.O.B.A.T. is featured prominently in issue #5, in a story dedicated to the vehicle. In-story, the acronym stood for "Multi-Ordnance BAttle Tank".

The M.O.B.A.T. is one of the vehicles a player can use in the 1985 G.I. Joe computer game. The M.O.B.A.T. toy also receives a brief mention, along with the Terror Drome, in the Stephen King horror novel The Tommyknockers.

=== Mudfighter ===
The Mudfighter bomber was first released in 1989, packaged with the pilot Dogfight. It featured two bomb racks, with sixteen AS-99 air-to-surface bombs, and a 100FW 1670 lb. "propfan" propeller with forward/reverse power modes.

=== Persuader ===
The Persuader high-speed laser tank was first released in 1987, packaged with the action figure Back-Stop. It featured a "Heatwave" 10 Megawatt armor-piercing laser cannon, six "Dart" Sam-37 missiles, and 10-wheel drive. It was recast in black and red, and released as the Night Force Night Storm in 1988.

=== Phantom X-19 ===
The Phantom X-19 stealth fighter jet was first released in 1988, packaged with the pilot Ghostrider. It featured two "Bullseye" computer-aided low-altitude missiles, two BY-106 "Little Guy" long-range air-to-air missiles, two opening wings with flip out laser cannons, and retractable landing gear.

=== Raider ===
The Raider was first released in 1989, packaged with the driver Hot Seat. It featured titanium reinforced support legs for the upper section to maintain perfect balance in attack mode and allow the Raider's armaments to attack oncoming ground vehicles. It was armed with a dual-impact photo cannon, two tactical infrared computer-controlled laser blasters, and two large missiles housed inside the vehicle.

=== Retaliator ===
The Retaliator helicopter was first released in 1990, packaged with the pilot Updraft. It features a capture claw with built in winch hook, super-speed rotor blades, four missiles, and a bomb ramp with nine bombs.

=== Rolling Thunder ===
The Rolling Thunder armored missile launcher was first released in 1988, packaged with the driver Armadillo. It featured two large "Double Team" quad thruster rockets, which were hidden in the housing of the Rolling Thunder itself, and could be moved into launch position. Each rocket contained six "Firefly" free fall cluster bombs. The Rolling Thunder also came with a small ATSV (All Terrain Scout Vehicle), many laser cannons and missiles, and a turret-mounted "Short Throw" 90mm main battle cannon.

=== S.H.A.R.C. ===
The S.H.A.R.C. Flying Submarine (Submersible High-speed Attack and Reconnaissance Craft) was first released in 1984, packaged with the action figure Deep Six. It featured two acoustic homing torpedoes, twin flip-up 30mm "Tidal Wave" cannons, and had both underwater and air-attack capabilities. It was recast in black and red, and released as the Night Force Night Shade in 1988. It was repainted with chrome parts, and released as the Sky Patrol Sky S.H.A.R.C. in 1990.

=== Shark 9000 ===
The Shark 9000 was first released in 1993, packaged with the Battle Corps version of Cutter. It was originally planned to be part of the "Drug Elimination Force" line of figures and vehicles. The attack boat featured a water cannon, a spring-loaded "Aqua Attack" missile launcher, H2O X-1 machine guns, and actually floated with wind-up motor action.

=== Skystorm ===
The Skystorm X-wing chopper was first released in 1988, packaged with the pilot Windmill. Based partially on the Sikorsky S-72, it featured a turbo-shaft engine, and was armed with two large bombs and four missiles.

=== Skystriker XP-14F ===
The Skystriker XP-14F is a variable wing fighter aircraft that was first released in 1983, packaged with the Ace action figure. It featured two each of the S3 Sidewinder, S3 Sparrow and S3Z Phoenix missiles, two ejection seats with working parachutes, and two Vulcan cannons. It was recast in black and red, and released as the Night Force Night Boomer in 1989.

Its first comic book appearance was in issue #14 of the G.I. Joe comic published by Marvel Comics. It was the central focus in issue #34, as Ace pilots a Skystriker in a dogfight against the Cobra pilot Wild Weasel. Neither pilot wins. It often appears in relation to the USS Flagg, the Joe's fictional aircraft carrier. For example, several Skystrikers are lost over the carrier's side during a tsunami. Its final appearance was in issue #115, after which Ace has traded it for the newer more sophisticated Ghoststriker X-16.

When the G.I. Joe animated series was launched in 1985, the Skystriker was the team's only fighter aircraft. It was used by every qualified Joe member until the second season, when the Conquest X-30 took over in conjunction with the release of that toy. Although both the toy and the real life Northrop Grumman F-14 Tomcat fighter it was based upon were twin-seat designs, it was rarely portrayed as such in the associated comic books and cartoons. In the episode "The Wrong Stuff", several Skystrikers were modified for space travel. In "Battle for the Train of Gold", many Skystrikers were destroyed in a strafing run outside of Fort Knox.

The Skystriker is also featured in the 1985 G.I. Joe computer game.

An updated version of the original toy was released in 2011. Featuring new tooling based on the original, but with a one-seat cockpit, the new Skystriker was given the designation XP-21F, with the name parsed as "Sky Striker" on the packaging. In addition to the new tooling, the XP-21F features darker gray plastic for its body and wings than the original toy. A redecoed version of the XP-21F mold based on the Transformers character Starscream was released as a San Diego Comic-Con exclusive in 2011. The XP-21F mold was subsequently reused as a 2013 International G.I. Joe Convention exclusive Night Force Night Boomer, and a Jetfire version (with new parts resembling the Autobot jet's boosters) at the 2013 San Diego Comic-Con.

=== Slugger ===
The Slugger Self-Propelled Cannon was first released in 1984, packaged with the action figure Thunder. It featured a 170mm Howitzer cannon, a removable .30 caliber machine gun, a rear bumper/stabilizer, and a closable hatch to protect the figure inside the armored vehicle.

=== Snow Cat ===
The Snow Cat tracked arctic vehicle was first released in 1985, packaged with the action figure Frostbite. It featured a 680 hp engine, two high-speed "Avalanche" ski-missiles, and room for up to 10 Joes. It was repainted and released as the Tiger Force Tiger Cat in 1988.

=== Thunderclap ===
The Thunderclap was first released in 1989, packaged with the driver Long Range. It consisted of three components: a tractor vehicle, a trailer vehicle, and a cannon base. The tractor vehicle featured a MG-999 assault weapon, and two surface-to-surface missiles. The trailer vehicle had a computer-controlled blaster cannon, and three surface-to-surface cruise missiles. The main piece of the Thunderclap was its cannon base, featuring the huge extendable "Annihilator" cannon, with four stabilizer legs to support the base when set up separately from the vehicle itself. The cannon also had a mechanism that holds the shells, and simulated actual firing.

=== Tomahawk ===
The Tomahawk is an all-weather, twin-engine, twin-rotor heavy lift/assault as well as troop transit helicopter for the G.I. Joe Team. It has a top speed of 175 mph when fully loaded. Its turboshaft engine is fitted with heat/noise reduction and layered with bulletproof covering. It is armed with 6 × 250 lb. freefall "dumb" bombs, 2 × air-to-ground missile which can also be used for air-to-air engagements, crew-operated laser-enhanced night vision system .50 calibre machine guns on each side, and a six-barreled 20mm cannon mounted under the nose.

The toy version offers seating for a pilot, co-pilot and removable seating for five passengers. It was first released in 1986, and came packaged with the action figure pilot Lift-Ticket. It featured a rear cargo ramp/door, a working winch and propeller, five removable seats, a 20mm cannon, and two laser-enhanced NVS .50 caliber machine guns. While not identical, the Tomahawk is similar in design to the Marine CH-46 Sea Knight and the Army CH-47 Chinook.

The Marvel Comics version is different in design. There are no seats, but it can carry a passenger capacity of 10. Because of its primary purpose of carrying troops in and out of enemy territory, it became one of the most heavily used G.I. Joe vehicles. It is commonly flown by Lift-Ticket or Wild Bill. Many times the helicopter would work off of the fictional aircraft the USS Flagg, such as in issue #56 when Lift-Ticket brings in a wounded and confused Stalker.

The Tomahawk is a central focus of G.I. Joe Special Missions #17. In relation to a cameo in the previous mission, it had come under fire after a Joe team crosses hostile territory to rescue several colleagues. Despite several of the crew being wounded, including Lift-Ticket himself, they make a successful pick-up and retreat.

In the Devil's Due line of comics, a Tomahawk craft supports the Joe team in the first four issues of the G.I. Joe: Frontline series. It is an insertion craft from a Joe assault team on Destro's Trans-Carpathian castle. An important plot point is that it is compatible with Cobra helicopters, specifically the "Cobra Mamba".

=== Toss 'n Cross ===
The Toss 'n Cross Bridge Layer was released in late 1984 as a Sears exclusive, and entered general retail in 1985. It came packaged with the Tollbooth action figure. The toy, although not a close copy like many others in the series, was inspired by the M60A1.

=== Triple "T" ===
The Triple "T" (Tag Team Terminator) was first released in 1986, packaged with the Sgt. Slaughter action figure. The one-man tank featured two high explosive anti-tank missiles, and a 950 hp turbine engine. It was recast in black and red, and released as the Night Force Night Raider in 1988. In 1993, the original toy was offered as a mail-in vehicle, with magenta colored guns and missiles.

=== V.A.M.P. ===
The V.A.M.P. (Vehicle: Attack: Multi Purpose) was part of the original 1982 A Real American Hero release. Packaged with the action figure Clutch, the design functioned essentially as their Jeep, but was a two seat variant based on the experimental Lamborghini Cheetah. It was armed with dual-mounted 7.62mm machine guns that swiveled and elevated. The V.A.M.P. Mark II was released in 1984, and foregoing the original's green color and twin machine guns, it was instead painted tan and equipped with a quad-mount missile launcher (carrying the fictional Stinger XK-1 missile). A Sears exclusive included the V.A.M.P. four-wheeled drive vehicle with the H.A.L. artillery laser. Also in 1984, the vehicle was available as the Cobra Stinger, this time cast in black plastic with a larger missile system. Additionally in 1986, the toy was again a Sears exclusive sold as the Dreadnok Ground Assault 4WD. The V.A.M.P. Mark II was repainted and released as the Tiger Force Tiger Sting in 1989.

=== Warthog A.I.F.V. ===
The Warthog A.I.F.V. (Armored Infantry Fighting Vehicle) was first released in 1988, packaged with the driver Sgt. Slaughter. It featured two large MGM-59 "Lance" surface-to-surface missiles, and an interior bay to hold extra troops.

=== Wolverine ===
The Wolverine Armored Missile Vehicle was first released in 1983, packaged with the action figure Cover Girl. It featured twelve Stinger ground-to-ground missiles, a tow hook, removable engine cover, and rescue cable. It was repainted and fitted with new parts in 1989, and released as the Slaughter's Marauders Lynx.

== Other G.I. Joe vehicles ==
- A.P.C. – The A.P.C. (Amphibious Personnel Carrier) was first released in 1983. It was the first troop transporter for the Joes, featuring seat belts and a 50mm auto-control cannon, and it held 23 G.I. Joe soldiers. The A.P.C. was recast in black and red, and released as the Night Force Night Scrambler in 1989.
- Armadillo – The Armadillo mini-tank was first released in 1985. The small all-purpose tank featured 60mm synchronized variable-range cluster cannons. It was repainted and fitted with new parts in 1989, and released as the Slaughter's Marauders Armadillo.
- Attack Cruiser – The Attack Cruiser was released in 1991. It featured two mines, two missiles, and a launchable attack glider.
- Badger – The Badger was first released in 1991. It featured all-track radial tires, a 25,000 lb. tow hook with stabilizer, and an auto-fire missile launcher. In 1993, it was recast and released as the "Crimson Cruiser", as part of the Street Fighter II toy line, also produced by Hasbro at the time.
- Barracuda – The Barracuda submarine was first released in 1992. It featured three "Shredder" torpedoes, movable stabilizer fins, and real diving action caused by included baking soda tablets.
- Battle Wagon – The Battle Wagon was released in 1991. It featured a detachable missile launcher with twelve missiles, and the vehicle itself was motorized.
- Bomb Disposal – The Bomb Disposal vehicle was released in 1985. It featured anti-tank mines, a hydraulic claw, and a universal tow hook.
- Brawler – The Brawler was first released in 1991. It featured fifteen detachable grenades, a missile launcher with two large missiles, and a removable hatch cover.
- Desert Apache – The Desert Apache AH-74 helicopter was first released in 1992, as part of the Sonic Fighters line. It featured electronic sounds, spring-loaded missile launchers, a 30mm chin gun, and a turbo-shaft thruster.
- Devilfish – The Devilfish high-speed attack boat was first released in 1986. It featured twin 110 hp jet motors, twin 20mm repeater cannons, two water guided "Captor" torpedoes, and four laser guided "Sea Phoenix" missiles. It was repainted and released as the Tiger Force Tiger Fish in 1989.
- Eco-Striker – The Eco-Striker was a recast of the A.W.E. Striker vehicle, released in 1992 as part of the Eco-Warriors line. The cannon was replaced by a water-firing gun.
- Falcon Glider – The G.I. Joe Falcon Glider was first released in 1983, packaged with the tan version of the action figure Grunt.
- Fort America – Fort America was released in 1992, as part of the Sonic Fighters line. It was a mobile fortress that featured electronic sounds, spring-loaded missile launchers, and transformed from a combat tank into a battle fortress.
- Hammer – The Hammer was first released in 1990, based on the designs of the GM Hummer vehicle. It featured a removable engine cover, a high-impact pulse cannon, a fully rotational gun turret, and quick slide rear hatches with storage ducts.
- L.C.V. Recon Sled – The L.C.V. (Low Crawl Vehicle) Recon Sled was first released in 1986.
- Locust – The Locust attack copter/bomber was first released in 1990. It featured four air-to-air missiles, and a tinted blast-proof windscreen canopy. A recolored version of the Locust was also included with the General in 1990.
- Manta Ray – The Manta Ray was first released in 1994. It was an inflatable attack raft, with three lock-on torpedoes, a front-mounted torpedo launcher, and a turbo-blast engine.
- Mobile Battle Bunker – The Mobile Battle Bunker was first released in 1990. It featured a 5,000 round laser ammunition dispenser, two double-barreled mortar cannons, and a hidden missile rack that popped out from the inside.
- Monster Blaster A.P.C. – The Monster Blaster A.P.C. (Armored Personnel Carrier) was first released in 1993, as part of the "Mega Marines" line. Designed to be driven by the Mega Marine version of Clutch (sold separately), the heavily armored troop transporter featured a "Lock 'n Load" missile launcher, four heat-seeking missiles, and puncture proof tires.
- Mudbuster – The Mudbuster was first released in 1993. It was and all-terrain 4x4 battle truck, that featured a "smash 'n bash" bumper, a 360-degree rotating missile launcher, and puncture proof tires.
- Patriot – The Patriot was first released in 1992. It featured a multi-terrain track system, a quick recoil side machine gun, and triple-barreled laser cannon.
- Polar Battle Bear – The Polar Battle Bear (Skimobile) was first released in 1983. It featured movable twin 55mm cannons, two heat seeking missiles, a 160 hp V-6 engine, and a tow-hook for vehicle accessories.
- Radar Rat – The Radar Rat is a battlefield robot released in 1989, with two MM-15 "Flat Face" target guidance dishes, three terminal homing/active radar missiles, and puncture proof tires.
- R.A.M. – The Rapid Fire Motorcycle was part of the original A Real American Hero release in 1982. It included a Vulcan 20mm Gatling Cannon side car, and twin saddle bags. The R.A.M. was recast as a Sears exclusive in 1986, sold as the Dreadnok Ground Assault Motorcycle.
- Razor-Blade – The Razor-Blade helicopter was first released in 1994. It featured two handles with a connecting string, and by holding one of the handles and pulling the string tight, the helicopter would glide along the string. The vehicle also comes with a figure rescue backpack to "scoop" Joes out of harm's way.
- R.P.V. – The R.P.V. (Remote Piloted Vehicle) was first released in 1988. The hydraulically operated missile rack could be elevated with the attached remote, and had room for a figure in the driver's seat.
- Silver Mirage Motorcycle – The Silver Mirage Motorcycle was first released in 1985. It featured a silver finish and a sidecar with gun operator's seat, two ground launch missiles and a 10-round mortar launcher.
- Skyhawk VTOL – The Skyhawk VTOL (Vertical Take-Off and Landing) aircraft was first released in 1984. It featured twin "Thunderclap" cannons, and two air-to-surface rockets. The Skyhawk was recast as a Sears exclusive in 1986, sold as the Dreadnok Air Assault VTOL. It was repainted with chrome parts in 1990, and released as the Sky Patrol Sky Hawk.
- Storm Eagle – The Storm Eagle A.T.F. (Advanced Tactical Fighter) was released in 1992. It was a one-piece water-shooting jet, with four missiles and rear landing gear.
- Swamp Masher – The Swamp Masher twelve-wheeled swamp vehicle was first released in 1988. It featured four tri-wheeled tracks for navigating rough terrain, and a 4.3 liter 350 hp engine.
- Tri-Blaster – The Tri-Blaster is a battlefield robot released in 1989. It is a one-man 4WD vehicle, with a triple-barreled pulse fire laser cannon, and digital communications array.
- Weapon Transport – The Weapon Transport vehicle was released in 1985. It came with a Force MK88 magnesium cased bomb, and removable bomb trailer.

=== Marauders ===
Unlike other recast and repainted vehicles, the Slaughter's Marauders line borrowed previous G.I. Joe vehicle designs, and added newly minted parts to enhance their camouflaged frames. All three vehicles were released in 1989, and came without an action figure.

- Armadillo – Based on the Armadillo mini-tank, it featured a missile launcher with stabilizer bar, and six missiles.
- Equalizer – Based on the Mauler M.B.T., but is not motorized. Instead, it featured a flip-up radar dish, dual missile launchers with six missiles, and dual M-80A anti-lock machine guns.
- Lynx – Based on the Wolverine tank, but without the missile launchers. Instead, its main weapon was a huge cannon, similar to the one attached to the Mauler M.B.T.

=== Night Force ===
The Night Force vehicles were repaints of existing G.I. Joe and Cobra vehicles, sold exclusively by Toys "R" Us, and designed for "top secret nighttime missions". None of these vehicles included a driver.

- Night Blaster – The Night Blaster was a repaint of the Cobra Maggot in black and red, and was first released in 1988.
- Night Boomer – The Night Boomer was a repaint of the G.I. Joe Skystriker in black and red, and was first released in 1989.
- Night Raider – The Night Raider was a repaint of the Triple "T" in black and red, and was first released in 1988.
- Night Ray – The Night Ray was a repaint of the Cobra Moray hydrofoil in black and red, and was first released in 1989.
- Night Scrambler – The Night Scrambler was a repaint of the G.I. Joe A.P.C. in black and red, and was first released in 1989.
- Night Shade – The Night Shade was a repaint of the G.I. Joe S.H.A.R.C. in black and red, and was first released in 1988.
- Night Storm – The Night Storm was a repaint of the G.I. Joe Persuader in black and red, and was first released in 1988.
- Night Striker – The Night Striker was a repaint of the G.I. Joe W.H.A.L.E. in black and red, and was first released in 1988.

=== Tiger Force ===
- Tiger Cat – The Tiger Cat armored half-track was a repaint of the Snow Cat arctic vehicle. It was first released in 1988, packaged with the Tiger Force version of Frostbite.
- Tiger Fish – The Tiger Fish was a repaint of the Devilfish high-speed attack boat, and was first released in 1989.
- Tiger Fly – The Tiger Fly attack helicopter was a repaint of the Dragonfly XH-1 assault copter. It was first released in 1988, packaged with the Tiger Force version of Recondo.
- Tiger Paw – The Tiger Paw was a repaint of the Cobra Ferret ATV, and was first released in 1988.
- Tiger Rat – The Tiger Rat attack plane was a repaint of the Cobra Rattler. It was first released in 1988, packaged with the pilot Skystriker.
- Tiger Shark – The Tiger Shark was a repaint of the Cobra Water Moccasin, and was first released in 1988.
- Tiger Sting – The Tiger Sting was a repaint of the V.A.M.P. Mark II, and was first released in 1989.

== Cobra vehicles with drivers ==
=== BUGG ===
The Cobra BUGG was first released in 1988, packaged with the driver Secto-Viper. It was an amphibious command vehicle, with a removable two-man hovercraft/submarine, twin cannons, machine guns, anti-aircraft gun, and two missiles.

=== Condor Z-25 ===
The Cobra Condor Z-25 was first released in 1989, packaged with the pilot Aero-Viper. The Condor has two different component parts that are detachable at the touch of a button; an attack "wing, and a high-speed aircraft. Other special features included a thumb-wheel bomb dropping mechanism, bomb-bay doors, retractable landing gear, and dual-laser support cannons.

=== Detonator ===
The Cobra Detonator was first released in 1993, packaged with the driver Nitro-Viper. It featured six monster tires, three long-range ICBM rockets, and a targeting seat with AAK gun.

=== Dictator ===
Overlord's Dictator was first released in 1990, packaged with the Overlord action figure. It is a simple combination track and wheeled craft, with rapid-fire .40 caliber machine guns, and low to the ground air-to-surface missiles.

=== Firebat ===
The Cobra Firebat was included with the Terror Drome playset in 1986, packaged with the A.V.A.C. (Air Viper Advanced Class) pilot. A later mail-in version came in a brighter red color, without the A.V.A.C. figure.

=== Hammerhead ===
The Cobra Hammerhead submersible sea tank was first released in 1990, packaged with the driver Decimator. It featured two detachable attack subs with missile firing capabilities, an airtight self-contained control center, a decompression chamber, and an airborne/undersea command module with pivoting radar unit.

=== H.I.S.S. ===
The Cobra H.I.S.S. (Hi Speed Sentry) was first released in 1983, and was packaged with the HISS Driver action figure. It came with twin 90mm "Double Diablo" cannons, which could swivel and elevate. Along with the F.A.N.G. and the Viper Glider, this toy was one of the first three Cobra vehicles to be released, a full year after the initial Joe team vehicles.

As Cobra's primary tracked vehicle, this toy was meant to face-off against the M.O.B.A.T. tank. However, the toy's build quality was significantly lower, and unlike the M.O.B.A.T. toy, the H.I.S.S. toy was not motorized, in fact the "tracks" were made of solid molded plastic, with plastic wheels underneath to allow for mobility.

A version of the Cobra H.I.S.S came with a Cobra Commander figure as part of the Built to Rule line in 2004. The package came with one set of building blocks that could be built into a full-sized vehicle. The Cobra Commander figure also featured places on the forearms and calves where blocks could be attached.

The H.I.S.S. was featured prominently in the comics and the first season of the animated series.

=== H.I.S.S. II ===
The Cobra H.I.S.S. II was first released in 1989, packaged with the driver Track Viper. It is an updated version of the original H.I.S.S. tank, and featured a hull that opens to carry Cobra Troopers, a tri-barreled thermal-propulsion cannon, two 100mm armor-piercing laser machine guns, and two surface-hovering "Slam" missiles.

=== H.I.S.S. III ===
The Cobra H.I.S.S. III was first released in 2000. It is a repainted version of the original Cobra H.I.S.S. tank, and includes the driver Rip-It, Cobra's Heavy Equipment Operator.

=== Hurricane V.T.O.L. ===
The Cobra Hurricane V.T.O.L. (Vertical Take-Off and Landing) was first released in 1990, packaged with the pilot Vapor. It featured eleven missiles, dual 75mm cannons, and a VTE-490 pilotless attack drone mounted on its back.

=== Maggot ===
The Cobra Maggot was three vehicles in one. It was first released in 1987, packaged with the driver W.O.R.M.S. It could be separated into a long-range gun emplacement with 155mm cannon, a battlefield control vehicle, and a high-speed attack vehicle with a 1000 hp turbo-diesel engine. It was recast in black and red, and released as the G.I. Joe Night Blaster in 1988.

=== Mamba ===
The Cobra Mamba was a supersonic attack helicopter. It was first released in 1987, packaged with the pilot Gyro-Viper. The Mamba featured two detachable "MOLT" assault pods (Mamba Offensive Light Tactical), six missiles, and a NT-58 turbo-shaft engine.

=== Moray ===
The Cobra Moray hydrofoil was first released in 1985, packaged with the Cobra Lamprey pilot. It featured a V-12 engine, two air-to-water torpedoes, four small missiles with a pop-up launcher, and an array of .30 caliber machine guns. It was recast in black and red, and released as the G.I. Joe Night Ray in 1989.

=== Night Raven S³P ===
The Cobra Night Raven S³P was first released in 1986, packaged with the Strato-Viper action figure. Based on the SR-71 Blackbird and D-21 drone, the Night Raven featured two twin missile pods, a single person "Drone" recon jet, twin 20mm cannons, and dual Viper Mach 3.5 turbojet engines. It was repainted with chrome parts, and released as the G.I. Joe Sky Raven in 1990.

=== Rattler ===
The Cobra Rattler is a VTOL attack aircraft inspired by the USAF A-10 Thunderbolt II. It originally appeared in 1984, packaged with the pilot Wild Weasel, and was intended as Cobra's answer to the Skystriker, which had been added to the toyline a year earlier. It was repainted and released as the G.I. Joe Tiger Rat in 1988.

=== Sea Ray ===
The Cobra Sea Ray was first released in 1987, packaged with the driver Sea Slug. The underwater attack and aerial reconnaissance vehicle featured a two-stage ship with eight "Snake Attack" surface-to-air missiles, two 30mm cannons, and a "Thruster" Mach-2 turbojet engine.

=== Stellar Stiletto ===
The Cobra Stellar Stiletto was first released in 1988, packaged with the pilot Star-Viper. It featured dual "Stellar" main propulsion engines, the capability of exit and re-entry into Earth's atmosphere, and the tail could be maneuvered so that the Stiletto could achieve the semblance of a VTOL (Vertical Take Off and Landing) launch. It was recast and released as the G.I. Joe Starfighter in 1993, as part of the Star Brigade line.

=== Stinger ===
The Cobra Stinger Night Attack 4WD vehicle was first released in 1984. Packaged with the Stinger Driver action figure, it featured four ground-to-air rockets with 360-degree rotation. The Stinger was recast as a Sears exclusive in 1986, sold as the Dreadnok Ground Assault 4WD.

=== STUN ===
The Cobra STUN was first released in 1986, packaged with the Motor-Viper action figure. It was a three-wheeled vehicle, with forward assault pods that split down the center. Each pod was armed with twin "Blazer" rotating laser cannons. It was recast in a red and black cross "Snake Skin" camouflage, and released as the Python STUN in 1989, as part of the Python Patrol line.

=== Thunder Machine ===
Promotional image of Dreadnok Thunder Machine.

The Thunder Machine was released in 1986, complete with the action figure of the Thrasher. It was a four-wheeled, armored, weaponized vehicle used by the Dreadnoks. The fiction describes it as cobbled together from parts salvaged from several different vehicles, including a 1980s model Pontiac Trans-Am, a dune buggy, a pickup truck and various others. The Thunder Machine is propelled by a jet engine similar to jet-propelled dragsters. This made it fast but hard to maneuver. The vehicle was built on a military truck chassis, similar to a Humvee. It had armor plating riveted over most of the exterior surface. The armor is believed to be from old tanks, and according to Thrasher, the Thunder Machine is capable of taking as much, if not, more damage than a Cobra H.I.S.S tank. The front tires were racing tires, adding some maneuverability. Since an engine wasn't required, the front of the truck was replaced with the nose of a 1970s era Pontiac Trans Am on top of which was mounted a roll cage and two huge armor-piercing Gatling guns. In a nod to many of the original Mad Max vehicles, which were Australian police cars, the vehicle has a police light bar mounted on the roof.

The toy featured belt-fed synchronized "Penetrator" Gatling guns, and had room for a driver, passenger, and eight people standing on the running boards. In 1993, it was recast, and released as the "Beast Blaster", as part of the Street Fighter II toy line, also produced by Hasbro at the time. It was also released in Venezuela, in slightly different colors.

The vehicle first appears in G.I.Joe #51. A Dreadnok-led escape by Zartan from Joe Headquarters leads to a multi-vehicle chase through the swamps. In issue #69, Thrasher, Monkeywrench and Zarana were in it as it was driven out a besieged Cobra base called a Terror Drome situated in the fictional war-torn country of Sierra Gordo.

The Thunder Machine is also featured in a puzzle image from Milton Bradley, with art by Dave Dorman.

=== Water Moccasin ===
The Cobra Water Moccasin swamp cruiser was first released in 1984, packaged with the Copperhead action figure. It featured twin 44mm "Destructor" cannons, 20mm roof-mounted DES-20B twin machine guns, a "Gator" surface torpedo, and a 580 hp engine. It was repainted and released as the G.I. Joe Tiger Shark in 1988.

=== W.O.L.F. ===
The Cobra W.O.L.F. (Winter Operational Light Fighting Vehicle) was first released in 1987, packaged with the driver Ice-Viper. The W.O.L.F. was a winter attack vehicle, and featured four "Wham" surface-to-air missiles and two "Snarl" ski-torpedoes.

== Other Cobra vehicles ==
- Adder – The Cobra Adder was first released in 1988, and featured two large "White Heat" surface-to-surface missiles.
- Buzz Boar – The Buzz Boar underground attack vehicle was first released in 1987.
- C.A.T. – The Cobra C.A.T. (Crimson Attack Tank) was a Sears exclusive first released in 1985. Billed as "A Crimson Guard Weapon", it is a recast of the M.O.B.A.T. in black and red. It was likewise motorized, propelled by a small 2xD battery-powered electric motor that drove the tank's tracks, allowing the toy to move forward/reverse and turn under its own power.
- Devastator – The Devastator is a battlefield robot released in 1989. It featured four "HOTS" (High Output Terrain-Hugging System) missiles, a "Tandem Blaster" .50 caliber machine gun, and hardened steel rear tracks.
- Earthquake – The Cobra Earthquake was first released in 1992. It was a heavily armored earth mover, that featured three "drop 'n shoot" mortar bombs, a 50mm machine gun, and four surface-to-surface missiles.
- F.A.N.G. – The F.A.N.G. (Fully Armed Negator Gyrocopter) was first released in 1983. The light-attack helicopter was equipped with four air-to-air heat-seeking rockets, a nose-mounted machine gun turret, and an underbody bomb hardpoint. The F.A.N.G. was designed for quick Cobra raids. Along with the H.I.S.S. and the Viper Glider, this toy was one of the first three Cobra vehicles to be released, a full year after the initial Joe team vehicles. The F.A.N.G. figured prominently in the comics and the first season of the animated series. The F.A.N.G. was also featured in the 1985 G.I. Joe computer game. The F.A.N.G. was recast as a Sears exclusive in 1986, sold as the Dreadnok Air Assault Gyrocopter.
- F.A.N.G. II – The F.A.N.G. II was first released in 1989, and is an updated version of the original F.A.N.G. helicopter. It features rotating wings, a 20mm long range cannon, and six "AIMZ-33" air-to-air missiles.
- F.A.N.G. III - The F.A.N.G. III was first released in 2002, and is smaller than the previous two versions. It is armed with twin barrel chain guns, and two missiles, and includes the driver Cobra C.L.A.W.S.
- Ferret – The Cobra Ferret all-terrain vehicle was first released in 1985. It featured two laser-guided missiles, a .50 caliber machine gun, and a four-cycle fender engine. It was repainted and released as the G.I. Joe Tiger Paw in 1988.
- Flight Pod – The Cobra Flight Pod (also known as the "Trubble Bubble") was a one-man bubble craft for surveying G.I. Joe from above. It was first released in 1985, and could also be used as a transport for the SNK aerial mine. The Trubble Bubble was heavily utilized on the Sunbow cartoon.
- Hovercraft – The Cobra Hovercraft is a battlefield robot released in 1989. It featured high-speed rotors, a dual-barreled "Crusher" .50 caliber machine gun, and four "Sailfish" surface torpedoes.
- Hydro-Sled – The Cobra Hydro-Sled was first released in 1986, and featured a rapid fire 9mm cannon, two guided "Sunk" torpedoes, and a wire-guided "Snag" spear gun.
- Ice Sabre – The Cobra Ice Sabre was first released in 1991. It featured rear side-mounted anti-aircraft cannons, and a swinging missile launcher system, with laser guidance, and a built in "cap firing" mechanism that would discharge when a missile was fired.
- Ice Snake – The Cobra Ice Snake is a fast-attack snow vehicle. It was first released in 1993, and featured a spring-action 360-degree rotating missile launcher, a roll-cage canopy, and heavy duty treads.
- IMP – The Cobra IMP was first released in 1988. It was a one-man tank that carried three Infrared Imaging missiles, and each missile contained eight removable mines secured around the center of the two-stage bombs.
- Jet Pack – The Cobra Jet Pack was first released in 1987, and featured two jet intakes, two "Neutralizer" air-to-air missiles, and four 25mm machine guns.
- Liquidator – The Cobra Liquidator A.T.F. (Advanced Tactical Fighter) was released in 1992. It was a one-piece water-shooting jet, with four missiles and rear landing gear. It is based on the Saab 35 Draken fighter jet.
- Night Landing – The Cobra Night Landing was an infiltration device for night missions, and was released in 1985.
- Paralyzer – The Cobra Paralyzer was first released in 1991. It was a tracked assault vehicle that featured a swiveling battle turret with 360-degree rotation, a double-barreled concussion cannon, and three missiles. In 1993, it was recast and released as the "Sonic Boom Tank", as part of the Street Fighter II toy line, also produced by Hasbro at the time.
- Parasite – The Cobra Parasite was first released in 1992. It was an armored personnel carrier, that featured a "bomb firing catapult" with three gyro-catapult bombs, a rotating laser chin gun, and could carry up to 17 figures.
- Piranha – The Cobra Piranha was first released in 1990. It featured surface-skimming missiles, a removable machine gun emplacement, a 12,000 hp engine, and a high-velocity depth charge launcher.
- Pogo – The Cobra Pogo (Ballistic Battle Ball) was a one-man attack vehicle. It was first released in 1987, and featured maneuverability with its three resilient landing pods, and rotating machine gun turret. It was recast and released in 1993 as the Cobra Invader, as part of the Star Brigade line.
- Rage – The Cobra Rage tank was first released in 1990. It featured four air-to-air missiles, a 25-valve thruster engine, and a movable turret with a long-range dual-barreled concussion cannon.
- Rat – The Cobra Rat was first released in 1992. It was a high-speed attack hovercraft, and featured launchable anti-aircraft flak rotors with stabilizer control spokes.
- Scorpion – The Cobra Scorpion was first released in 1994. It featured a 360-degree rotating missile launcher, a pivoting Gatling gun, and a fuel-injected V8 engine.
- Septic Tank – The Cobra Septic Tank was released in 1991, as part of the Eco-Warriors line. It featured a hydro powered sludge liquifier/compressor, and color change battle damage. The body of the Septic Tank was created by modifying the mold of the original H.I.S.S. tank, and the compressor could be fed water through a hose, like a water pistol.
- S.M.S. – The Cobra S.M.S. (Sentry and Missile System) was a Sears exclusive first released in 1985. Billed as "A Crimson Guard Weapon", it is a recast of the Cobra H.I.S.S. in red, with a bonus M.M.S. in red and black for the sentry to tow.
- Viper Glider – The Cobra Viper Glider was first released in 1983, packaged with the Viper Pilot action figure. The Viper Glider is a re-paint of the G.I. Joe Falcon Glider. Along with the F.A.N.G. and the H.I.S.S., this toy was one of the first three Cobra vehicles to be released, a full year after the initial Joe team vehicles.

== G.I. Joe playsets ==
=== Defiant Space Vehicle Launch Complex ===
The Defiant Space Vehicle Launch Complex was a combination vehicle and playset released in 1987, and it came packaged with the Payload and Hardtop action figures. Retailing at US$129.99, the cost of the playset—the most expensive toy in Hasbro's G.I. Joe: A Real American Hero lineup—led to Hasbro re-releasing the shuttle two years later as a stand-alone vehicle called the Crusader, which used the same mold as the Defiant shuttle. The toy also came with a re-painted version of the Payload action figure.

=== General ===
The General first appeared in the 1990 edition of the toyline from Hasbro. It is described as the G.I. Joe Team's mobile strike headquarters. Major Storm is the commander of the vehicle.

The General is a large wheeled platform with an armored tractor attached to the front. The General is armed with a plethora of enemy detectors: third generation image intensifiers, infrared detectors, pulse Doppler radar and laser range finders. It is surrounded by several gun emplacements and armed with anti-aircraft capabilities. The middle of the back opens up to reveal a ramp and giant mortar cannon. The platforms also serve as helicopter landing pads. The General comes with a Locust mini-helicopter for reconnaissance purposes.

The General was used extensively during the first season of the DiC-produced G.I. Joe animated series, such as in the episode "General Confusion". In said episode, both Joes and Cobra mention how the General is the most powerful vehicle in existence. The General was then featured in the second season of DiC with a much more minor role. The vehicle was also featured on the cover of the 1990 Hasbro-produced coloring book published by "A GOLDEN BOOK Western Publishing Company, Inc."

=== Headquarters Command Center ===
The G.I. Joe Headquarters Command Center was a weapons-laden fortress, which contained movable surveillance cameras, search lights, machine guns, and a cannon that could pivot in any direction. A hidden section in the base of the main platform, contained an area to store file cards. The Headquarters could be split into four parts: a helipad, a heavy equipment supply depot, a motor pool, and the command center. It was portrayed in the Marvel comic book as a "prefabricated" fortress in issue #24, "The Commander Escapes".

A new version was released in 1992, that was much different from the original. It featured collapsible towers, electronic battle sounds, spring-loaded missile launchers, a removable bunker, a fuel station for vehicles, and a movable elevator. The entire headquarters could fold up, with a handle to carry the playset around.

=== Mobile Command Center ===
The Mobile Command Center, or MCC for short, was a three-level mobile fortress, which contained service, command and missile bays, and was armed with high-tech weaponry. It was first released in 1987, packaged with the Steam Roller action figure. Its appearance is that resembling a small building with near-featureless exterior and tank treads at the bottom. The huge size though, presents a problem in how it could be deployed outside of the United States. Its size and few defensive capabilities suggest just what its name indicates, as a mobile command post and not more than that.

The MCC features electronic and communications countermeasure equipment at the top, and is armed with HE-27 "Shockwave" missiles, which are guided by a missile control radar. The front of the vehicle is armed with computer-operated twin .50 caliber cannons, while the back is protected by a "Barrage" missile cannon. The diesel engine can run at 2000 kW and with 2700 hp. Despite its immense size, the MCC is quite mobile and maneuverable, given the right terrain. The huge body can open up, and set itself as a stationary open-air command post, complete with a control center, a prisoner holding cell and a service station for small assault vehicles.

In the Marvel Comics G.I. Joe series, its first appearance was in issue #100 (hinted at in #99). It was used to disrupt Cobra Python Patrol forces that had arrived at G.I. Joe's desert HQ. It had been buried in the sand, and Joe forces drive Cobra towards it. The sand is shaken off and the Command center opens fire. Its weaponry damages a Cobra aircraft, which is then flown into the Command Center itself. A rear tread is destroyed with only minor cosmetic damage to the rest of the vehicle. Steam Roller professes admiration for the pilot's courage. He then heads into the desert to subdue the pilot, who is clearly seen descending by parachute.

In animated form, it was featured in the direct-to-video movie, G.I. Joe: Valor vs. Venom, where it is scaled-down, about the size of a large truck instead, allowing it to go into a suburban neighborhood.

=== Tactical Battle Platform ===
The Tactical Battle Platform was introduced in 1985, and featured multi-level battle platforms, a loading ramp, munitions room, control room and a heli-pad. It was transportable, and armed with a rotating radar-guided cannon, and surface-to-air missiles.

=== U.S.S. Flagg ===
The USS Flagg aircraft carrier is a combination vehicle and playset. First released in 1985, it remained in production until 1991 and was redesigned in 1992. It came packaged with the Admiral Keel-Haul action figure, along with various vehicles and other objects. Multiple Skystriker fighter jet toys could be placed on its flight deck. A unique feature of the playset is the sound system, allowing the child to trigger preset announcements such as general quarters or else project their own voice on the deck of the ship through a microphone.

Not only is the Flagg the largest playset released in the A Real American Hero toyline, but at seven feet (2.1 m) long, as of 2010 it is the largest model playset made by any manufacturer. It was so large that when first pitched as a product, it had to be explained to the audience that the ship was not just the presentation table for the smaller toys that came with it, but was the proposed product itself. It was tested for ruggedness by having a grown man walk on it. Making such a large playset was considered financially risky, but in the event it had successful Christmas sales for the 1985 launch. Such a playset was only made possible by the decision of Hasbro to switch from 11 1/2-inch (29 cm) action figures to 3 3/4-inch (9.5 cm) for the preceding Star Wars franchise. The larger scale would have produced an unfeasibly large playset. The Flagg is now highly collectible. Originally selling for $89.99 (equivalent to $269 in 2025), complete sets can fetch $1,000 at auction, and if in an unopened box, this can rise to $2,000.

It is unclear which aircraft carrier is the inspiration for Flagg, although USS Nimitz has been suggested. The lead playset designer, Ron Rudat, stated that a real aircraft carrier had been visited to establish realism, but he could not remember which one.

In-story, the Flagg was named after General Lawrence J. Flagg, a character that first appeared in the Marvel Comics comic book series and later killed off. The Flagg had the fictional hull number CVN-99.

== G.I. Joe vehicle accessories ==
=== Coastal Defender ===
The Coastal Defender was first released in 1987. It was a missile launcher that looked like a large crate when it was being towed behind a G.I. Joe vehicle. After a few transformations, it could be assembled into a coastline missile defense with a radar dish and four missiles.

=== H.A.L. ===
The H.A.L. (Heavy Artillery Laser) was included as part of the original 1982 release of the A Real American Hero toyline. It was packaged with the Grand Slam action figure. The H.A.L.'s double-barreled cannon was mounted on a swivel base, which allowed it to be elevated and rotated 360 degrees, and it was designed to be towed behind either the V.A.M.P. or M.O.B.A.T. vehicles. With a removable CRT sighting and locating computer, the H.A.L. is one of the first lines of defense for the Joes.

=== M.M.S. ===
The M.M.S. (Mobile Missile System) was a surface-to-air system included as part of the original 1982 release of the A Real American Hero toyline. It was packaged with the Hawk action figure, and based upon the Raytheon MIM-23 Hawk. The M.M.S. consists of a launch platform, control panel, and three detachable surface-to-air missiles, and is designed to be towed behind either the V.A.M.P. or M.O.B.A.T. vehicles.

=== Road Toad B.R.V. ===
The Road Toad B.R.V. (Battlefield Recovery Vehicle) was first released in 1987. It featured a powerful winch system, a "Puncher" 25mm cannon, two "Buzz" SSM-94 wire-guided missiles, and was designed to be towed behind any G.I. Joe vehicle with a tow hook.

=== S.L.A.M. ===
The S.L.A.M. (Strategic Long-Range Artillery Machine) was first released in 1987. The dual cannon had legs that could be hidden inside the weapon, and extended to stabilize it when firing. It was designed to be towed behind any G.I. Joe vehicle with a tow hook.

=== Whirlwind ===
The Whirlwind twin battle gun was first released in 1983. It featured twin 20mm cannons that rotated, two collapsible tow wheels, and 360 degree rotation of the main unit. It was designed to be towed behind any G.I. Joe vehicle with a tow hook.

== G.I. Joe battlefield accessories ==
=== F.L.A.K. ===
The F.L.A.K. (Field Light Attack Kannon) was included as part of the original 1982 release of the A Real American Hero toyline. Its simulated howitzer on folding legs could elevate and swivel, and could be knocked down and transported. The F.L.A.K. was primarily used as an anti-aircraft cannon, and helped to defend the G.I. Joe Team from tank or plane attacks. The barrel fired high explosive rounds and smoke tracers, and could fire 20,000 rounds without being replaced.

=== J.U.M.P. ===
The J.U.M.P. Jet Pack (Jet Unit: Mobile Propulsion) was included as part of the original 1982 release of the A Real American Hero toyline. It was re-packaged in 1983 with the Grand Slam action figure. Both versions came with a laser blaster and launch pad. It also had a command console with advanced communication capabilities. The titanium launch pad was designed for portability and field durability, and the J.U.M.P. had a 2-hour fuel supply, with an average speed of 150 MPH.

=== M.A.N.T.A. ===
The M.A.N.T.A. (Marine Assault Nautical Transport: Air-Driven) was first released as a mail-in offer in 1984. The wind surfer included a .30 cal. machine gun, and a backpack to hold the M.A.N.T.A. pieces when disassembled.

== Other G.I. Joe accessories ==
- PAC/RATs (Programmed Assault Computer/Rapid All Terrain) - First released in 1983, these battlefield robots provided the G.I. Joe Team with extra firepower operated by remote control activators.
  - Flamethrower - With twin laser cannons
  - Machine Gun - With four gun barrels
  - Missile Launcher - With four twin-stage boosted missiles
- Battle Stations - First released in 1984, these battlefield accessories were designed to complement G.I. Joe battle scenes.
  - Bivouac (1984) - A forward observation post with a tent, rocket launcher and field radio
  - Mountain Howitzer (1984) - A small cannon designed to be towed by G.I. Joe vehicles
  - Watchtower (1984) - A one-man defense station with a ladder, machine gun and flag pole
  - Air Defense (1985) - With two EE-14N long-range surface-to-air missiles
  - Check Point Alpha (1985) - Two-piece watchtower with gate and road bump
  - L.A.W. (1986) - The Laser Artillery Weapon is a stationary, uni-directional "infinity" laser. The base acts as a target acquisition/surveillance system for the weapon.
  - Outpost Defender (1986) - With gun crate, mock tin roof with sandbags, and air-cooled machine gun
- Defense Units - First released in 1984, these battlefield accessories were designed to complement G.I. Joe battle scenes.
  - Machine Gun Defense Unit (1984) - With two tripod barricades, a machine gun with ammo belt, and warning sign
  - Missile Defense Unit (1984) - With a missile launcher, brick wall, ammo case, and "Ammunition Depot" sign
  - Mortar Defense Unit (1984) - With a mortar, stackable sandbags, and two gas cans
  - Ammo Dump Unit (1985) - Supply case containing 3 missiles, 3 rockets, 2 mortars, a gas can and ammo box
  - Forward Observer Unit (1985) - With a tent, infrared - monocular device, and 3-piece mortar with ammo box
- Motorized Action Packs - First released in 1987, these battlefield accessories featured wind-up action.
  - Anti-Aircraft Gun (1987)
  - Helicopter Pack (1987)
  - Radar Station (1987)
  - Rope Walker (1987)
  - Double Machine Gun (1988)
  - Mine Sweeper (1988)
  - Mortar Launcher (1988)
- Motorized Vehicle Packs - Similar to the Motorized Action Packs, these mini-vehicles were first released in 1988, and featured wind-up action.
  - A.T.V. (All-Terrain Vehicle) (1988)
  - Tank Car (1988)
  - Scuba Pack (1988)

== Cobra playsets ==
=== Cobra Missile Command Headquarters ===
Exclusively from Sears, the Cobra Missile Command Headquarters was similar to the G.I. Joe version, except that it was made of brittle chipboard. Available in 1982, it featured a movable elevator, a console with three seats, and a Cruise Missile that pivots up and down. It came with three figures: a Cobra Officer, a Cobra Soldier, and Cobra Commander.

=== Terror Drome ===
The Terror Drome is a small pre-fab fortress/headquarters for Cobra. The playset was first released in 1986, and comes with a vehicle service and refueling bay, munitions depot, a prison cell for a G.I. Joe action figure, tower-mounted cannons, and a launch silo for the Firebat interceptor mini-jet. The original playset also included the action figure A.V.A.C (Air Viper Advanced Class), intended as the pilot of the Firebat aircraft.

=== Toxo-Lab ===
The Cobra Toxo-Lab playset was first released in 1992, as part of the Eco-Warriors line. It was designed as a staging ground for Cobra's evil plots against the G.I. Joe Eco-Warriors. This playset featured a spring-loaded toxo-gun, a crane with claw arm, a "Plasma-Tox" container with color-change battle damage, and a "Toxo-Tank" with real diving action, caused by included baking soda tablets.

In 1993, the design of the Toxo-Lab was used for the "Dragon Fortress", as part of the Street Fighter II toy line, also produced by Hasbro at the time. The Dragon fortress had different features than the Toxo-Lab, such as a bungee jump, a trampoline launcher, and a double-barreled cannon.

== Cobra battlefield accessories ==
=== A.S.P. ===
The Cobra A.S.P. (Assault System Pod) was a vehicle accessory with a cockpit, and turret with rotating 120mm "Eliminator" cannons. It was first released in 1984, and was designed to be towed behind the Cobra H.I.S.S. vehicle. It was recast in a red and black cross "Snake Skin" camouflage, and released as the Python A.S.P. in 1989, as part of the Python Patrol line.

=== Battle Barge ===
The Cobra Battle Barge was first released in 1988. It was a stationary defense station with three machine guns, and a magnetic array detection radar.

=== C.L.A.W. ===
The Cobra C.L.A.W. (Covert Light Aerial Weapon) was a one-man flying weapon that housed a machine gun, a flashfire bomb (used when piloted remotely), and two venom rockets. It was first released in 1984, and was featured in the Marvel Comics story "Silent Interlude", portrayed in G.I. Joe: A Real American Hero #21.

=== S.N.A.K.E. ===
The Cobra S.N.A.K.E. (System Neutralizer-Armed Kloaking Equipment) was an armored suit that attached to Cobra troopers, and in the Marvel comic, could brainwash Joes. It was first released in 1984, and again in a dark blue color in 1985. Both versions feature four arm attachments: a claw, flamethrower arm, machine gun arm, and rocket.

== Other Cobra accessories ==
- Battle Stations/Defense Units - First released in 1985, these battlefield accessories were designed to complement Cobra battle scenes.
  - Cobra Bunker (1985) - A small battle station designed to survive a direct hit from a G.I. Joe missile
  - Rifle Range Unit (1985) - With three rifles, two flip-down targets with sandbag supports, and a firing embankment
  - Surveillance Port (1986) - An outpost featuring a 16mm machine gun and air search radar
- Motorized Action Packs - First released in 1987, these battlefield accessories featured wind-up action.
  - Earth Borer (1987)
  - Mountain Climber (1987)
  - Pom-Pom Gun Pack (1987)
  - Rope Crosser (1987)
  - Dreadnok Battle Axe (1988)
  - Machine Gun Nest (1988)
  - Twin Missile Launcher (1988)
- Motorized Vehicle Packs - Similar to the Motorized Action Packs, these mini-vehicles were first released in 1988, and featured wind-up action.
  - Gyro Copter (1988)
  - Rocket Sled (1988)

== See also ==
- Action Force vehicles
- Action Man Vehicles
- Fictional military aircraft
- G.I. Joe: America's Movable Fighting Man vehicles
- G.I. Joe Adventure Team vehicles
- List of G.I. Joe: A Real American Hero characters
