= G.I. Joe: A Real American Hero (disambiguation) =

G.I. Joe: A Real American Hero is a line of action figures and toys created by Hasbro.

G.I. Joe: A Real American Hero may also refer to:

- G.I. Joe: A Real American Hero (1983 TV series), the original Sunbow-Marvel-co-produced animated series which ran from 1983 to 1986
- G.I. Joe: A Real American Hero (1989 TV series), the DiC animated series which ran from 1989 to 1992
- G.I. Joe: A Real American Hero (Marvel Comics), a comic book series based on the toyline
- G.I. Joe: A Real American Hero (Devil's Due), a continuation of the Marvel Comics series
- G.I. Joe: A Real American Hero (IDW Publishing), a second continuation of the Marvel Comics series, ignoring the Devil's Due series
- G.I. Joe: A Real American Hero (Skybound Entertainment), a continuation of the IDW Comics series
- G.I. Joe: A Real American Hero (video game), a 1985 game by Epyx for the Apple II and the Commodore 64
- G.I. Joe: A Real American Hero 25th Anniversary, updated figures based on the classic toyline

== See also ==
- G.I. Joe (disambiguation)
- A Real American Hero (film)
