= G.I. Joe: A Real American Hero (Skybound Entertainment) =

American comic book series

- Cover A for issue #301.

Publication information
- Publisher: Skybound Entertainment (Image Comics)
- Format: Ongoing series
- Publication date: November 15, 2023 – present
- No. of issues: 301–
- Main character(s): G.I. Joe; Cobra

Creative team
- Written by: Larry Hama
- Artist(s): Andrew Krahnke; Chris Mooneyham
- Penciller: Paul Pelletier
- Inker: Tony Kordos
- Colorist: Francesco Segala

G.I. Joe: A Real American Hero is an ongoing American comic book series published by Image Comics and Skybound Entertainment based on Hasbro's G.I. Joe toy line by Stanley Weston and Donald Levine. The series is being written by Larry Hama and continues the run left from the previous series by Marvel Comics and IDW Publishing, starting with issue #301. The series debuted on November 15, 2023.

== Premise ==
A new era for G.I. Joe begins in G.I. Joe: A Real American Hero #301 with this jumping on point for new readers as your favorite characters – Duke, Scarlett, Roadblock, Storm Shadow, Cobra Commander, Serpentor and more – are back for new battles, new friends, new enemies and…THE RETURN OF THE ORIGINAL SNAKE-EYES!

— Skybound Entertainment, official synopsis

== Publication history ==
=== Background ===
After IDW Publishing lost the licenses to produce Transformers and G.I. Joe comics by the end of 2022, Hasbro announced in December 2021 that Skybound Entertainment, an imprint of Image Comics, would acquire those licenses.

Therefore, IDW's run of G.I. Joe: A Real American Hero, which was continued from the original run by Marvel Comics, ended with issue #300.

In June 2023, Skybound officially announced to have gained the license.

=== Development ===
Alongside the Energon Universe, which brings new G.I. Joe comics, Larry Hama continues writing A Real American Hero, starting from issue #301, where both the Marvel and IDW series left off. Chris Mooneyham is the series' artist, while Francesco Segala is the colorist. The series debuted on November 14, 2023.

Hama said, "I am delighted to be continuing the saga of G.I. Joe with the good folks at Skybound and totally amped to be taking the G.I. Joe team to issue #301 and beyond. Little did I know back in 1982 that I would be associated with the Real American Hero for over 40 years. My thanks to the whole crew at Skybound for allowing me to continue to chronicle the exploits of characters who have become like a family to me.”

Additionally, Skybound released G.I. Joe: A Real American Hero #1 Larry Hama Cut, a reprint of the Marvel series' first issue, featuring Hama's original script, which was altered in the original print run. It was published on November 15, 2023.

Between April 2025, Skybound published a collection of one-shots titled "Silent Missions", alongside a reprint of G.I. Joe: A Real American Hero #21. In April 2026, Skybound published a second wave of "Silent Missions", from the point of view of Cobra characters.

In October 2026, Skybound will publish a crossover comic book series with the Tomb Raider franchise, featuring Lara Croft as canon into the G.I. Joe: A Real American Hero continuity.

== List of publications ==
=== Main series ===
Title	Issues	Writer	Artists	Colorist	Premiere date
G.I. Joe: A Real American Hero	#301–	Larry Hama	Chris Mooneyham (#301–305, 311–313, 315, 321, 325); Paul Pelletier (penciller, #306–310, 316-320, 322-324, 329-331); Tony Kordos (inker, #306–310, 316-320, 322-324, 329-331); Andrew Krahnke (#314, 326-328); Pat Olliffe (#332)	Francesco Segala	November 15, 2023

=== Limited series ===
Title	Issues	Writer	Artist	Colorist	Premiere date
G.I. Joe: A Real American Hero/Tomb Raider	5	Kyle Higgins	Elena Casagrande	Alex Guimarães	October 7, 2026

=== One-shots ===
Title	Writers	Artist	Colorist	Premiere date	Note
G.I. Joe: A Real American Hero — Beach Head	Phil Hester		Lee Loughridge	April 2, 2025	"Silent Missions"
G.I. Joe: A Real American Hero — Jinx	DANI and Dan Watters	DANI	Brad Simpson	April 9, 2025	"Silent Missions"
G.I. Joe: A Real American Hero — Spirit	Leonardo Romero		Cris Peter	April 16, 2025	"Silent Missions"
G.I. Joe: A Real American Hero — Roadblock	Andrew Krahnke		Francesco Segala	April 23, 2025	"Silent Missions"
G.I. Joe: A Real American Hero — Duke	Wes Craig		Jason Wordie	April 30, 2025	"Silent Missions"
G.I. Joe: A Real American Hero — Baroness	Joëlle Jones and Declan Shalvey	Joëlle Jones	Mike Spicer	April 1, 2026	"Silent Missions"
G.I. Joe: A Real American Hero — Crimson Guard	Gabriel Hardman		Matt Hollingsworth	April 8, 2026	"Silent Missions"
G.I. Joe: A Real American Hero — Zartan	Pat Olliffe and Tom DeFalco	Pat Olliffe	John Kalisz	April 15, 2026	"Silent Missions"
G.I. Joe: A Real American Hero — Copperhead	Howard Porter		Romulo Fajardo Jr.	April 22, 2026	"Silent Missions"
G.I. Joe: A Real American Hero — Firefly	Jorge Fornés		Dave Stewart	April 29, 2026	"Silent Missions"

=== Reprints ===
Title	Writer	Artists	Colorist	Release schedule
G.I. Joe: A Real American Hero #1 Larry Hama Cut	Larry Hama	Herb Trimpe and Bob McLeod	Glynis Wein	November 15, 2023
G.I. Joe: A Real American Hero #21 Silent Missions Edition	Larry Hama	Larry Hama and Steve Leialoha	George Roussos	April 2, 2025
G.I. Joe: A Real American Hero #26 Hama Files Edition	Larry Hama	Larry Hama and Steve Leialoha	George Roussos	November 26, 2025
G.I. Joe: A Real American Hero #49 Hama Files Edition	Larry Hama	Andy Mushynsky and Rod Whigham	George Roussos	January 28, 2026

== Collected editions ==
=== Trade paperback editions ===
Title	Material collected	Pages	Publication date	ISBN
G.I. Joe: A Real American Hero, Volume 1	G.I. Joe: A Real American Hero #301–305	120	September 17, 2024	ISBN 978-1534373686
G.I. Joe: A Real American Hero, Volume 2	G.I. Joe: A Real American Hero #306–310	112	January 28, 2025	ISBN 978-1534345546
G.I. Joe: A Real American Hero, Volume 3	G.I. Joe: A Real American Hero #311–315	112	July 1, 2025	ISBN 978-1534327009
G.I. Joe: A Real American Hero — Silent Missions	G.I. Joe: A Real American Hero #21 Silent Missions Edition; G.I. Joe: A Real American Hero — Beach Head; G.I. Joe: A Real American Hero — Jinx; G.I. Joe: A Real American Hero — Spirit; G.I. Joe: A Real American Hero — Roadblock; G.I. Joe: A Real American Hero — Duke	136	October 7, 2025	ISBN 978-1534333833
G.I. Joe: A Real American Hero, Volume 4	G.I. Joe: A Real American Hero #316–320	112	December 30, 2025	ISBN 978-1534334311
G.I. Joe: A Real American Hero, Volume 5	G.I. Joe: A Real American Hero #321–325	112	June 9, 2026	ISBN 978-1534335370
G.I. Joe: A Real American Hero, Volume 6	G.I. Joe: A Real American Hero #326–330	112	December 8, 2026	ISBN 978-1534335615

=== Hardcover editions ===
Title	Material collected	Pages	Publication date	ISBN
G.I. Joe: A Real American Hero: Deluxe Edition, Book 1	G.I. Joe: A Real American Hero #301–310	288	April 22, 2026	ISBN 978-1534331129

=== Compendium editions ===
Title	Material collected	Pages	Publication date	ISBN
G.I. Joe: A Real American Hero Compendium, Volume 1	G.I. Joe: A Real American Hero #1–50	1168	December 20, 2024	ISBN 978-1534371507
G.I. Joe: A Real American Hero Compendium, Volume 2	G.I. Joe: A Real American Hero #51–76; G.I. Joe Yearbook #1–4; G.I. Joe: Special Missions #1–15	1230	October 5, 2025	ISBN 978-1534331921
G.I. Joe: A Real American Hero Compendium, Volume 3	G.I. Joe: A Real American Hero #77–113; G.I. Joe: Special Missions #15–28	1215	May 19, 2026	ISBN 978-1534334076
G.I. Joe: A Real American Hero Compendium, Volume 4	G.I. Joe: A Real American Hero #114–155; G.I. Joe and the Transformers #1–4; G.I. Joe: Order of Battle #1–4; G.I. Joe Special #1	1230	September 22, 2026	ISBN 978-1534330030
G.I. Joe: A Real American Hero Compendium, Volume 5	G.I. Joe: A Real American Hero #155.5-190; G.I. Joe A Real American Hero Annual (IDW) 2012	TBA	TBA	TBA
G.I. Joe: A Real American Hero Compendium, Volume 6	G.I. Joe: A Real American Hero #191-235; G.I. Joe: A Real American Hero – Cobra World Order Prelude #1	TBA	TBA	TBA
G.I. Joe: A Real American Hero Compendium, Volume 7	G.I. Joe: A Real American Hero #236-273; Synergy: A Hasbro Creators Showcase; G.I. Joe: A Real American Hero: Yearbook 2019; G.I. Joe: A Real American Hero: Silent Option (IDW) #1-4; G.I. Joe: A Real American Hero: Silent Option Codename: Helix	TBA	TBA	TBA
G.I. Joe: A Real American Hero Compendium, Volume 8	G.I. Joe: A Real American Hero #274-300; G.I. Joe: A Real American Hero: 40th Anniversary Special #1; G.I. Joe: A Real American Hero Comic Packs (2008) #21B, 32.5, 36.5, 4-12; G.I. Joe: A Real American Hero Comic Packs (2009) #1-4, 6 (Resolute)	TBA	TBA	TBA

== See also ==
- G.I. Joe: A Real American Hero (Marvel Comics)
  - G.I. Joe and the Transformers
- G.I. Joe: A Real American Hero (Devil's Due Publishing)
- G.I. Joe: A Real American Hero (IDW Publishing)
  - G.I. Joe (IDW Publishing)
    - G.I. Joe (2019 comic book)
    - Snake Eyes: Deadgame
- Energon Universe (comics)
