= G.I. Joe (disambiguation) =

G.I. Joe is a line of military-themed action figures produced by Hasbro.

G.I. Joe may also refer to:

- G.I. Joe: A Real American Hero, the main toy line of the G.I. Joe franchise
- G.I. Joe Team, the elite military group portrayed in the toyline, comic books and cartoon series
- General Joseph Colton, a fictional character also known as the original G.I. Joe
- G.I. Joe, a slang name for an ordinary American soldier; see G.I.

== Comic books ==
- G.I. Joe (comics), chronicling G.I. Joe from 1942 through the present
- G.I. Joe (IDW Publishing), a series of comic books by IDW Publishing
- G.I. Joe: A Real American Hero (Marvel Comics), based on the toyline
- G.I. Joe: A Real American Hero (Devil's Due), a continuation of the Marvel Comics series
- G.I. Joe: A Real American Hero (IDW Publishing), a separate continuation of the Marvel Comics series
- G.I. Joe: A Real American Hero (Skybound Entertainment), a continuation of both the Marvel and IDW series
- G.I. Joe: America's Elite, a continuation of the series by Devil's Due Publishing

== Films ==
- The Story of G.I. Joe, a 1945 movie about US soldiers fighting in Italy during World War II
- G.I. Joe: The Movie, 1987 full-length animated movie
- G.I. Joe: Spy Troops, a 2003 direct-to-DVD CGI-animated movie
- G.I. Joe: Valor vs. Venom, a 2004 sequel to Spy Troops
- G.I. Joe (film series), live-action films based upon G.I. Joe
  - G.I. Joe: The Rise of Cobra, a 2009 live-action movie
  - G.I. Joe: Retaliation, a 2013 sequel to the 2009 film
  - Snake Eyes: G.I. Joe Origins, a 2021 G.I. Joe spin-off film centered around the character of Snake Eyes

== Television ==
- G.I. Joe: A Real American Hero (1983 TV series), original Sunbow-produced animated series from 1983 to 1986
- G.I. Joe: A Real American Hero (1989 TV series), DiC animated series running from 1989 to 1992
- G.I. Joe Extreme, animated series which ran from 1995 to 1997
- G.I. Joe: Sigma 6, 2005 animated series
- G.I. Joe: Resolute, 2009 animated series
- G.I. Joe: Renegades, 2010 animated series

== Video games ==
- G.I. Joe: Cobra Strike, 1983 by Parker Brothers for the Atari 2600 and Intellivision
- G.I. Joe: A Real American Hero (video game), 1985 by Epyx for the Apple II and the Commodore 64
- G.I. Joe (NES video game), 1991 by Taxan for the Nintendo Entertainment System
- G.I. Joe: The Atlantis Factor (NES video game), 1992 by Capcom for the Nintendo Entertainment System
- G.I. Joe (arcade game), 1992 by Konami
- G.I. Joe: The Rise of Cobra (video game), 2009 by Electronic Arts, based on the movie
- G.I. Joe: Battleground (iOS, Android), 2013 by DeNA, Backflip Studios
- G.I. Joe Strike (Android), 2015 by Backflip Studios
- G.I. Joe: Operation Blackout (Switch, PS4, Xbox One, Windows), 2020

== Other uses ==
- G.I. Joe (pigeon), a pigeon noted for his service during World War II

== See also ==
- List of G.I. Joe series
- List of G.I. Joe video games
- G.I. Joe's, a defunct sports and auto retailer from 1952 to 2007
- GI Jill, radio host for Armed Forces Radio Network during World War II
