= Snake Eyes: Deadgame =

Comic book limited series

- Cover A for issue #1 by Rob Liefeld.

Publication information
- Publisher: IDW Publishing (licensed by Hasbro)
- Format: Limited series
- Genre: Superhero
- Publication date: July 15, 2020 — July 7, 2021
- No. of issues: 5
- Main character: Snake Eyes

Creative team
- Created by: Rob Liefeld
- Written by: Rob Liefeld; Chad Bowers
- Pencillers: Rob Liefeld; Chance Wolf
- Inker: Adelso Corona
- Letterer: Andworld Design
- Colorist: Federico Blee
- Editors: John Barber; Megan Brown

Snake Eyes: Deadgame is an American comic book limited series by Rob Liefeld and Chad Bowers, and debuted on July 15, 2020, by IDW Publishing. The series features several characters from the G.I. Joe franchise by Donald Levine and Hasbro, but focuses on Snake Eyes as the main character.

The series debuted on July 15, 2020, and concluded on July 7, 2021.

== Premise ==
Snake Eyes faces an enemy that wants to expose his secret past, which endangers his time of service on G.I. Joe.

== Production history ==
=== Background ===
In 2018, IDW Publishing announced most of the G.I. Joe comics would be rebooted following the cancellation of Scarlett's Strike Force and the conclusion of the Hasbro Comic Book Universe. Therefore, while G.I. Joe: A Real American Hero by Larry Hama continues its run, a newly rebooted G.I. Joe series by Paul Allor and Chris Evenhuis started being published in September 2019.

=== Development ===
Snake Eyes: Deadgame was announced in July 2019, and is written by Rob Liefeld and Chad Bowers and drawn by Liefeld. He considered Snake Eyes as both an icon and "bucket list" for him, stating the character is "Wolverine, Deadpool and Spider-Man rolled into one amazing character for an entire generation of fans that thrilled to his adventures in comics and cartoons and hung on his every toy release! My parents drove me all over the county to get me G.I. Joe action figures as a kid. These were my first and most favorite toys. Working with Hasbro and all my friends at IDW has been a blast so far. I can't wait to get this work out into the public! If you enjoyed my recent Marvel work, this will match or exceed it!"

He also added that "G.I. Joe was my first obsession. Those were the toys in the sandbox with me, kung fu grip, eagle eye, I had them all. G.I. Joe is a world of characters that I have always aspired to participate in. Snake Eyes was a profound influence on me creating Deadpool. Producing this series is an all time bucket list achievement for me."

IDW Editor-In-Chief John Barber said "I've seen Rob's excitement about G.I. Joe for years. "I'm thrilled and amazed to see it all finally coming together in the biggest Snake Eyes comic book in decades — maybe ever! There's a real electric charge in the air every day as new pages come in — every one seemingly topping the last!"

A special one-shot issue titled Snake Eyes: Deadgame — Declassified was released on December 1, 2021.

== Issues ==
Issue	Written by	Drawn by	Colored by	Publication date
#1	Story by: Rob Liefeld; Script and dialogue by: Chad Bowers	Art by: Rob Liefeld; Additional inks by: Adelso Corona; Design by: Neil Vyetake	Federico Blee	July 15, 2020
Snake Eyes is tasked to infiltrate the islands of Svalbard, Norway. With the help of Roadblock and Tripwire, they rescue General Colton, the original G.I. Joe. Colton reveals that the Arashikage clan forced him to translate ancient scrolls in order to unleash a spell that revives Kirigun, an ancient ninja wizard who was presumed dead more than a thousand years ago. After a brief fight, Snake Eyes is saved by Scarlett and Kirigun escapes in order to find the Sword of the Dead for an event he knows as the Deadgame.
#2	Story by: Rob Liefeld; Script and dialogue by: Chad Bowers	Art by: Rob Liefeld; Inks by: Adelso Corona; Design by: Neil Vyetake	Federico Blee	October 7, 2020
When Snake Eyes and Scarlett search for the swords, they are ambushed by Intruder, who was sent to retrieve Snake Eyes, but the latter kills him after a fight. Then Olympia, Kirigun's daughter, attacks Snake Eyes with poisoned shurikens, leaving him unconscious long enough for her to kidnap him. Scarlett wants to save him, but Storm Shadow interferes. In an undisclosed location, Kirigun plans to test Snake Eyes by making him kill Jörmungandr, the World Serpent.
#3	Story by: Rob Liefeld; Script and dialogue by: Chad Bowers	Art by: Rob Liefeld; Inks by: Adelso Corona; Design by: Neil Vyetake	Federico Blee	November 25, 2020
When Storm Shadow intervenes, Snake Eyes gets enough help to defeat and kill the World Serpent, freeing Kirigun and Olympia from the curse of Izanami. Fortunately for Snake Eyes and Storm Shadow, they are saved by G.I. Joe's Adventure Team.
#4	Story by: Rob Liefeld; Script and dialogue by: Chad Bowers	Pencils and inks by: Rob Liefeld; Ink assistance by: Adelso Corona and Chance Wolf; Design by: Neil Vyetake	Federico Blee	February 3, 2021
Snake Eyes and the Adventure Team fight Kirigun and Olympia, but the two escape. Snake Eyes travels to Eismitte, Greenland, where he meets Thor, who entrusts him his hammer. When Kirigun takes the hammer from Snake Eyes, he is attacked by Baroness and Destro.
#5	Story by: Rob Liefeld; Script and dialogue by: Chad Bowers	Pencils and inks by: Rob Liefeld (Note: In co-operation with Neal Adams, Karl Altstaetterm, Eric Canete, Adelso Corona, Kevin Eastman, Dan Fraga, Cory Hamscher, Bjorn Hyne, Karl Kershcl, Karl Kesel, Marat Mycheals, Jerry Ordway, Ryan Ottley, Dan Panosian, Ed Piskor, Whilce Portacio, Jim Rugg, Tom Scioli, Paul Scott, Philip Tan and Chance Wolf.); Design by: Neil Vyetake	Federico Blee	July 7, 2021
In the final battle, Baroness and Destro fight against Snake Eyes and Olympia in order to take Thor's hammer. Baroness reveals that she made a deal with Olympia to resurrect Kirigun and use him to replace Cobra Commander. When Kirigun uses his sword to resurrect the dead, Snake Eyes confronts him. In the process, Kirigun destroys Thor's hammer, but Snake Eyes takes his sword and kills Kirigun for good. Baroness retreats during the battle. Some time later, Snake Eyes and Scarlett reunite in the Pit, another G.I. Joe location, when they receive a new mission about Major Bludd taking hostages in Sierra Leone.

== Reception ==
Issue	Publication date	Critic rating	Critic reviews	Ref.
#1	July 15, 2020	6.8/10	8	
#2	October 7, 2020	5.0/10	3	
#3	November 25, 2020	3.7/10	2	
#4	February 3, 2020	2.0/10	1	
#5	July 7, 2021	2.0/10	1	
Overall		3.9/10	15	

== Collected edition ==
Title	Material collected	Pages	Publication date	ISBN
Snake Eyes: Deadgame	Snake Eyes: Deadgame #1−5	144	December 7, 2021	1684057957, 978-1684057955
