= Zap (G.I. Joe) =

Character from the G.I. Joe franchise

- G.I. Joe character
- First appearance: 1982
- Voiced by: Buster Jones (Sunbow/Marvel)

In-universe information
- Affiliation: G.I. Joe
- Specialty: Bazooka Soldier
- File name: Melendez, Rafael J.
- Birth place: New York, NY
- SN: RA633980744
- Rank: E-4 (Corporal) (1982); E-6 (Staff Sergeant) (1997)
- Primary MOS: Combat Engineer
- Secondary MOS: Infantry, Artillery

Zap is a fictional character from the G.I. Joe: A Real American Hero toyline, comic books and animated series. He is the G.I. Joe Team's original bazooka soldier and debuted in 1982.

== Profile ==
His real name is Rafael J. Melendez, and his rank is that of corporal. Zap was born in New York City.

His primary military specialty is combat engineer and his secondary military specialty is infantry artillery. Zap functions on the team as a specialist in both armor-piercing and anti-tank weapons and he doubles as a demolitions man. He has received advanced infantry training, and specialized education in engineer school and ordnance school. Zap is a qualified expert with the M-14, M-16, M1911A1 Auto Pistol, M79 grenade launcher, M-72 LAW (Light Anti-Armor Weapon) Rocket, XM-17A TOW (Tube-launched, Optically-tracked, Wire command data link guided) Missile, and the XM-47 (Dragon Missile).

== Toys ==
Zap was first released as an action figure in 1982.

A new version of Zap was released as part of the Super Sonic Fighters line in 1991. He has a 2009 figure as a part of the 'Assault On Cobra Island' box set.

== Comics ==
=== Marvel Comics ===
In the Marvel Comics G.I. Joe series, Zap is featured in the first issue, along with the rest of the original roster. One of his first missions was helping to rescue peace activist and committed pacifist Dr. Adele Burkhart from the forces of Cobra.

Zap is featured in issue #4. Crazed militia commander Vance Wingfield, whose organization is partly funded by Cobra, has armed a nuclear bomb in the wake of his defeat. Assisted by Grunt, Zap successfully disables the bomb. Later, Zap helps defend the Kennedy Space Center from Cobra attack.

Scarlett, Snake Eyes and Zap are captured by Cobra during an investigation of the town of Springfield. It would turn out Springfield was basically Cobra down to the core, every citizen, even the children, a loyal member. Even the arcade carries live weaponry, a fact which almost kills the trio. While imprisoned, the Joes are drugged into a hallucinatory state. They are freed by their fellow inmate, a young boy named Billy who had learned the drugs were neutralized by the heat of the cell's light bulb. The Joes manage to steal a Cobra aircraft. Its navigational equipment is damaged, though and this, combined with a disorienting storm, keeps Springfield's location secret for now. Billy does not go with them, preferring to stay and work with Springfield's Cobra resistance.

Next, Zap plays a minor role in stopping Cobra from stealing weapons grade plutonium and spreading around a dangerous plague. Both threats are soon neutralized. He also flies a helicopter in a support role as G.I. Joe investigates Cobra activity in the Florida Everglades.

Later, the original Joe team would be taken off active duty and given administrative positions. This is quickly reversed when the location of Springfield is discovered. Most able Joes, Zap included, go on the offensive. Zap discovers a network of tunnels underneath the city, all primed to explode. He was not able to disarm the bombs but due to his warnings no one was killed in the explosion.

As with many other Joes, Zap helps dig out the new Joe HQ based in Utah.

Zap is one of about fifteen Joes to answer an illegal call for action by Roadblock. The Joe team had been framed for an attack on Cobra Island and Generals Hawk and Hollingsworth were being held prison in a small hospital. The Joes manage to storm the hospital and with the assistance of Destro, discredit the force opposing the Joes.

Zap assists First Sergeant Duke in judging and training a new class of G.I. Joe recruits.

Zap returns to action as part of a team selected to help protect the President of the United States during a baseball game. He is neutralized by the hypnotizing abilities of the Cobra agent, Crystal Ball. Cover Girl returns the hypnotized Joes to normal.

=== Devil's Due ===
Zap is one of the many Joes assigned to assault Cobra Island during the second of their civil wars.

It is later revealed that Zap has been promoted to the head of the New York G.I. Joe branch. Moments later, a building nearby containing Duke and Lady Jaye explodes. Zap leads the Joe-intensive rescue effort and personally uncovers his dazed but alive teammates.

Zap also appears in the Devil's Due series 'G.I. Joe Declassified', which takes place early in the Joe continuity. He, Stalker, Grunt and Rock'N'Roll are the focus of much Joe attention as they become lost far behind enemy lines, with no backup and ultimately, a badly wounded prisoner. Issue 3 of the series focuses on Zap's history, family and homelife. He reveals that he joined the military as a way to give back to society that had blessed his family so much.

During the World War 3 storyline Zap is listed in issue #28 as being deployed to Spain. A brief one panel appearance in #32 shows Zap fighting Cobra in Madrid.

=== IDW ===
Zap is part of a three-man team sent to Sierra Gordo to help rescue American hostages. With the assistance of Stalker, Shipwreck and various local law enforcement officers, the hostages are safely rescued.

In a crossover with the Six Million Dollar Man franchise Zap is one of about a dozen Joes entrusted with personally guarding the Presidents of America and Mexico and the Prime Minister of Canada.

== Animated series ==
=== Sunbow ===
Zap appeared in the original G.I. Joe animated series. Zap was voiced by Buster Jones. He first appeared in the "A Real American Hero" mini-series, and frequently appeared in the first season.

==== G.I. Joe: The Movie ====
Zap also appeared in the opening scene of the 1987 animated film G.I. Joe: The Movie, during the battle at the Statue of Liberty.

=== DiC ===
Zap reappeared in the DiC G.I. Joe animated series. All his appearances in the series were silent.

== Video games ==
Zap is one of the featured characters in the 1985 G.I. Joe: A Real American Hero computer game.

== Other works ==
Zap has a brief mention in the Scott Russell Sanders non-fiction novel Paradise Of Bombs.
