= Giacomo Bevilacqua =

Italian comic artist

Giacomo Andrea Bevilacqua (Rome, 22 June 1983) is an Italian cartoonist. He is the author of the comics A Panda Piace and one of the most popular modern cartoonists in his homeland.

On 22 May 2008, he created the first strips of A Panda piace, his most successful work. It was initially published exclusively on his blog and was later collected in two print volumes edited by BD Editions: A Panda piace (2009) and A Panda piace il bis (2010).

In the same year, together with Lorenzo Bartoli and Gabriele Dell'Otto, known Roman illustrator, he opened the "Sold out studio", an experience that would end two years later.

Parallel to the career of draftsman, Giacomo carries on that of actor and theatrical author for the company "Children Bad" by Marco Perrone and also works as a storyboarder for film and advertising, designer of T-shirts, and visualizer for advertising agencies. He collaborates with Play the Lab, the creative workshop of Nokia. In the same year, he founded, together with Francesco La Ferla, Stefano La Ferla, and Stefano Benedikter, the division "Pandalikes Games", whose first fruit, a game for iPhone and iPad, was released between the end of 2010 and the beginning of 2011.

In 2011, he drew the G.I. Joe comic Future Noir for IDW. In 2015, he started working for the publishing house BAO Publishing, realizing his first graphic novel entitled The Sound of the World by Heart, a fully written 192-page story, designed and colored by the author, and published in bookshops and comic book stores on 15 September 2016. It won the Feltrinelli readers' prize among the works nominated for Gran Guinigi 2017 at Lucca Comics and Games. Between May and September 2017, the graphic novel came out in France (Manhattan murmures) and in the United States (The Sound of the World by Heart). Forbes placed it among the 10 best graphic novels released in the United States in 2017.

In 2017, he also started a collaboration with Sergio Bonelli Editore with two other stories entirely written, drawn, and colored by the author. The first, entitled Lavennder, was released in July 2017 for the series Le Storie and then again in November of the same year in all the bookstores in a "deluxe" format. The second was released as a special volume of the Dylan Dog series dedicated to Groucho, released in the Grouchomicon collection.

== Selected bibliography ==
English

- G.I. Joe: Future Noir. Written by Andy Schmidt. San Diego: IDW Publishing. 2011. ISBN 978-16-1377-794-7.
- The Sound of the World by Heart. St. Louis: Magnetic Press. 2019 [2016]. ISBN 978-19-4130-238-5.

Spanish

- Lavennder. Modena: Panini Comics. 2018 [2017]. ISBN 978-84-9167-723-9.
- Attica. Modena: Panini Comics. 2021 [2019-2020].

French

- Panda Aime [Panda Likes]. Paris: Delcourt. 2013 [2009]. ISBN 978-27-5604-134-6.

== Awards and nominations ==
Year	Award	Category	Work	Result
2009	Attilio Micheluzzi Prize	Best webcomic	www.pandalikes.com	Nominated
2010	Attilio Micheluzzi Prize	Best webcomic	www.pandalikes.com	Nominated
2011	Attilio Micheluzzi Prize	Best webcomic	www.pandalikes.com	Won
2013	Attilio Micheluzzi Prize	Best writing	Metamorphosis	Nominated
2017	Gran Giunigi Prize	Feltrinelli readers' prize	The Sound of the World by Heart	Won
