= Andy Schmidt =

American comic book editor and writer

- Born: Peter Andrewes Schmidt
- Areas: Writer, Editor
- Notable works: Annihilation; Challenger Deep

Peter Andrewes "Andy" Schmidt is an American comic book editor and writer. He is best known for his work at Marvel and is now editing and writing at other companies.

== Career ==
At Marvel, Schmidt was an Associate Editor and mainly worked on the "Marvel Heroes" group of titles under Tom Brevoort. In 2006 he oversaw the "Annihilation" storyline, a major event involving a range of Marvel's cosmic characters.

In June 2008 it was announced that Schmidt had left Marvel and went to work for IDW Publishing, editing Star Trek and the revival of G.I. Joe. He has also taken up comic writing, with his first series being Challenger Deep at Boom! Studios, with an announced three-issue comic book adaptation of Star Trek II: The Wrath of Khan.

He owns and teaches at Comics Experience, a school dedicated to teaching comics writers and artists.

== Bibliography ==
=== Editor ===
- Secret War #1-5 (Marvel, 2004–2005)
- Annihilation event (Marvel, 2005–2006):
  - Drax the Destroyer (2005) #1-4
  - Nova (2006) #1-4
  - Ronan the Accuser (2006) #1-4
  - Silver Surfer (2006) #1-4
  - Super-Skrull (2006) #1-4
  - Annihilation #1-6 (2006)
- Ms. Marvel (Marvel, 2006) #1
- Star Trek: The Next Generation: The Last Generation (IDW Publishing, 2008)
- Star Trek: Countdown (IDW Publishing, 2009)

=== Writer ===
==== Comics ====
- "Cyclops and Wolverine" (with art by Marco Turini, in Marvel Comics Presents #8, Marvel, 2008)
- "The Hole" (with Frazer Irving, in X-Men: Divided We Stand #2, Marvel, July 2008)
- "Why Did It Have To Be Spiders?" (with pencils by Joe Lalich and inks by John Czop, in Creature Features #1, by Th3rd World Studios, 2008)
- Challenger Deep (concept by Andrew Cosby, with art by Chee, 4-issue mini-series, Boom! Studios, 2008)
- Star Trek II: The Wrath of Khan (with art by Chee, IDW Publishing, 2009)
- Five Days to Die (art by Chee, 5 issue mini-series, IDW Publishing, 2010)
- G.I. Joe: Future noir (art by Giacomo Bevilacqua, 2 issue mini-series, IDW Publishing, 2011)

==== Books ====
- The Insider's Guide To Creating Comics And Graphic Novels (176 pages, Impact, February 2009, ISBN 1-60061-022-6)
