= G.I. Joe (2019 comic book) =

American comic book series

- Cover A for issue #1 by Chris Evenhuis and Brittany Peer.

Publication information
- Publisher: IDW Publishing (licensed by Hasbro)
- Schedule: Monthly
- Genre: Action; Military; Science fiction
- Publication date: September 18, 2019 – February 17, 2021
- No. of issues: 10 (plus 1 tie-in)

Creative team
- Written by: Paul Allor
- Pencillers: Chris Evenhuis; Niko Walter; Ryan Kelly; Emma Vieceli
- Letterer: Neil Vyetake
- Colorist: Brittany Peer
- Editor: Bobby Curnow

G.I. Joe is an American comic book series published by IDW Publishing, written by Paul Allor and drawn by pencillers Chris Evenhuis, Niko Walter, Ryan Kelly and Emma Vieceli, alongside colorist Brittany Peer. Based upon the G.I. Joe franchise by Donald Levine and Hasbro, this series is a reboot of the previous comic book series that used to take place in the Hasbro Comic Book Universe.

The series began on September 18, 2019 and concluded on February 17, 2021.

== Premise ==
When the United States are ruled by the command of COBRA, a secret organization named G.I. Joe must fight back by recruiting citizens, but the propaganda created by COBRA makes the Joes look like public criminals.

== Production history ==
=== Background ===
In May 2008, IDW Publishing obtained the G.I. Joe comic book license from Devil's Due Publishing. After having acquired the comic book licence of various other Hasbro properties throughout the years—such as Transformers, Action Man, Rom, M.A.S.K., Micronauts and Visionaries—IDW announced the Hasbro Reconstruction campaign in January 2016; a launch meant to converge these franchises in the same continuity. In April 2018, it was announced that this shared continuity, the Hasbro Comic Book Universe (HCBU), would end with Transformers: Unicron in November.

Meanwhile, Larry Hama's G.I. Joe: A Real American Hero continues its run until 2022.

=== Development ===
The new G.I. Joe series was announced in June 2019, with writer Paul Allor and artist Chris Evenhuis as the creative team. Allor stated the story is "inspired both by modern warfare – where non-state actors fight vastly overpowered militaries to a perpetual standstill – and World War II, where Great Britain's SOE recruited civilians behind enemy lines. Old-school G.I. Joe fans will absolutely love it and find it true to everything G.I. Joe stands for, and new folks will be attracted to a deeply character-driven tale of hope and humanity, and about the power of resilience in an increasingly unraveling world".

After ten issues, the series concluded with the one-shot titled G.I. Joe: Castle Fall scheduled for February 17, 2021.

== Issues ==
Issue	Title	Written by	Drawn by	Colored by	Publication date
#1	"Life During Wartime"	Paul Allor	Chris Evenhuis	Brittany Peer	September 18, 2019
The United States are in war with COBRA, a terrorist organisation that launched a coup d'état against the country. To combat this threat, a clandestine group known as G.I. Joe was established. Meanwhile, Rithy "Tiger" Khay is a contraband smuggler who tries to support his legitimate delivery business. He is desperate for his life to change after his Cambodian parents were massacred in Indianapolis, and his boyfriend disappeared. One day, Tiger witnesses the murder of Duke at the hands of Major Bludd. Tiger finds Duke's USB flash drive inside a dumpster, but Scarlett takes it back, insisting Tiger to let it go. Refusing to believe that, Tiger then drops a molotov cocktail at a COBRA building, unaware he almost sabotaged a G.I. Joe mission, leading him to being forcefully taken to the Joes' secret headquarters. Despite most of the Joes' opposition, Scarlett offers Tiger a place in their team. General Hawk then announced they were forced to surrender against COBRA.
#2	"The Beginner's Guide to Surrender"	Paul Allor	Chris Evenhuis	Brittany Peer	October 23, 2019
Tiger attempts to adapt himself as part of G.I. Joe, but Scarlett is driven by grief over Duke's death, causing her to become more aggressive to Tiger during the training sessions. Duke's corpse is analysed by Doctor Mindbender, who criticizes Major Bludd for shooting him in the head. As a last resort, Hawk decides to secretly make a deal with Destro to win the war.
#3	"Breakfast in America"	Paul Allor	Chris Evenhuis	Brittany Peer	December 18, 2019
On Millville, Missouri, Roadbloack leads a mission to carry explosives against one of Cobra's headquarters. After an alternation with Lightfoot, the team manage to blow up the main bridge to prevent COBRA from trafficking more weapons, but it also alerts Baroness to report the COBRA Commander about the situation.
#4	"For COBRA"	Paul Allor	Niko Walter	Brittany Peer	January 1, 2020
Major Bludd remembers his actions when he started working for COBRA Technologies, when he killed a former employee who leaked information to Destro. He also remembered the moment he suspected of Tiger joining G.I. Joe. After making some research, Bludd discovered through Mindbender that COBRA was secretly working for Destro's company, M.A.R.S. Industries, in order to develop solutions to solve the world's social problems. Bludd leaves after Mindbender gives him several notes about Tiger.
#5	"Dreadnokistan"	Paul Allor	Chris Evenhuis	Brittany Peer	February 12, 2020
After arriving at the occupied territory of Dreadnokistan, Jinx and Stalker bond with some Dreadnocks, a gang led by Zartan. They all agree to evacuate the area on helicopters, but a B.A.T. android arrives to intervene, causing the helicopters to crash. As many of the Dreadnokistan community died in the process, Zartan rejects the Joes' help and sends his gang to another place.
#6	"The Fade Away"	Paul Allor	Chris Evenhuis	Brittany Peer	May 27, 2020
For their next mission, Operation Violet, G.I. Joe sends the Field Team into a train to Free Canada to smuggle an asset containing intelligence about several G.I. Joe agents. During the train travel, Fadeaway meets Tracee, a COBRA employee and former friend of hers. After cloning the data from a Viper's portable computer, the Field Team escapes to a secret location in Free Canada with Tracee. However, unaware to Tracee, she had a tracking device implanted, which led Vipers to attack the Field Team in order to retrieve her. As a last resort to escape from COBRA, Tracee commits suicide. Scarlett declares the mission failed, and when Jinx protests, Scarlett dismisses her from the G.I. Joe program. Afterward, Jinx decides to join forces with Snake Eyes to fight COBRA on their own terms.
#7	"A Soldier's Heart"	Paul Allor	Chris Evenhuis	Brittany Peer	August 19, 2020
Five years prior to COBRA's invasion, Scarlett dealt with post-traumatic stress disorder after his time of service in the military. Back then, Duke suggested her going to a support group led by Kenneth Rich, where she tried to adjust herself while facing her past that led her to her current state, with no avail, but when one of the patients unexpectedly committed suicide out of depression, Scarlett decided to start over in order to progress. After COBRA took over the world, Scarlett had already dealt with her trauma, and Duke welcomed her to the G.I. Joe initiative. Note: This issue featured the special participation of Patricia Watson (PhD, U.S. Department of Veterans Affairs) and Duane K.L. France (U.S. Army SFC, LPC) as consultants. In September, the issue was released free online during the National Suicide Prevention Awareness Month to coincide with the Governor's Challenge to Prevent Suicide Among Service Members, Veterans, and their Families, which was sponsored by the Substance Abuse and Mental Health Services Administration.
#8	"Our Toxic Friends"	Paul Allor	Emma Vieceli	Brittany Peer	September 9, 2020
Bombstrike is an undercover agent sent to Trans-Carpathia by Chuckles as a Canadian diplomat, in order to seduce Doctor Venom, a roboticist who designed the Battle Android Trooper (B.A.T.) technology. On the other side, Venom has his own plans to leave COBRA with Bombstrike, after developing fellings for her. After a dinner hosted by Overlord, the two attempt to transfer a USB flash drive containing information about COBRA and the B.A.T.s. But when Bombstike is sent to a dungeon, Venom rescues her. The mission is succeeded, and Venom is transferred to an unknown location, but Bombstrike questions her own feelings for him.
#9	"No Ground Left to Live"	Paul Allor	Ryan Kelly	Brittany Peer	October 28, 2020
In Sagarmandu, Bhantal, a G.I. Joe field team infiltrates a B.A.T. factory protected by Vipers, but Tunnel Rat become the last survivor. When he managed to destroy the factory with grenades, he ends up being retrieved by Shipwreck.
#10	"VIIper"	Paul Allor	Niko Walter	Brittany Peer	November 11, 2020
Lady Jaye is a G.I. Joe member, and Frontier's wife, who works undercover as the assistant of Doctor Mindbender, who has been using brain-dead human bodies to turn them into Vipers. One night, Subject VII regains her own consciousness and started attacking Lady Jaye and Mindbender. During a fight, Mindbender tries to lock Subject VII again, but Lady Jaye shoots a tube that spreads sleeping gas around the three. Awakened, Lady Jaye convinces Subject VII to escape, while then reunites with Frontier and Tiger.
One-shot	Castle Fall	Paul Allor	Chris Evenhuis	Brittany Peer	February 17, 2021
In the final mission of G.I. Joe against COBRA, several Joes team pursue Doctor Mindbender in a van, only to find Major Bludd inside. Bludd takes the van with Lady Jaye prisoner. He attempts to negotiate with Scarlett to be a double agent against COBRA Commander, but she shoots him down instead, remembering he killed Duke. Mindbender checks on the necklace of Bludd's dog, Sheila, saying "Castle Fall", and deduces it is a final operation to use B.A.T. armies to destroy G.I. Joe headquarters. After being shot, Bludd secretly revels the true purpose: in case Bludd was dead, the B.A.T.s would be automatically triggered to kill every Viper soldier, which causes the rest of the citizens to riot. Bludd kills Mindbender to avoid suspicion. All Joe teams gather to capture the Commander, while Tiger fights Baroness, but both of them escape unsuccessfully because their helicopter crushes down on the coast. With COBRA down and Chicago free, Scarlett gives a speech that encourages people to deal with the aftermath by joining G.I. Joe.

== Reception ==
Issue	Publication date	Critic rating	Critic reviews	Ref.
#1	September 18, 2019	7.5/10	8	
#2	October 23, 2019	7.7/10	8	
#3	December 18, 2019	8.5/10	5	
#4	January 1, 2020	7.3/10	5	
#5	February 12, 2020	8.4/10	5	
#6	May 27, 2020	7.6/10	5	
#7	August 19, 2020	8.5/10	2	
#8	September 9, 2020	6.7/10	3	
#9	October 28, 2020	6.0/10	3	
#10	November 11, 2020	7.5/10	3	
Castle Fall	February 17, 2021	7.9/10	7	
Overall		7.6/10	47	

== Collected editions ==
Title	Volume	Material collected	Publication date	ISBN
G.I. Joe: World on Fire	1	G.I. Joe #1−10; G.I. Joe: Castle Fall	April 14, 2021	1684056756, 978-1684056705
