= G.I. Joe: A Real American Hero (IDW Publishing) =

Comic book series

- Cover A for issue #155 1/2 by Herb Trimpe, Agustin Padilla and Glynis Wein.

Publication information
- Publisher: IDW Publishing
- Publication date: May 2010 – November 2022
- No. of issues: 155 1/2 – 300; 1 annual
- Main character(s): Cobra; G.I. Joe

Creative team
- Written by: Larry Hama
- Penciller: Varies
- Colorist: Varies

G.I. Joe: A Real American Hero is a comic book series written by Larry Hama and published by IDW Publishing. Based on the G.I. Joe franchise by Donald Levine and Hasbro, the comic book is set in the original continuity by Marvel Comics and ignores the previous continuity by Devil's Due Publishing. Because of this, the numbering of the issues started where the Marvel Comics run left at #156, with a special issue #155 1/2 given out for free.

The series debuted in May 2010 and concluded in November 2022 with issue #300, following the announcement of the G.I. Joe comic book license leaving IDW by the end of the year. The series resumed once again with issue #301 under new license holder Skybound Entertainment in November 2023.

== List of titles ==
=== Main ===
- G.I. Joe: A Real American Hero (#155 1/2–300, 1 annual)
- G.I. Joe: A Real American Hero — Silent Option (#1–4)
- G.I. Joe: A Real American Hero — Yearbook 2019
- G.I. Joe: A Real American Hero — Yearbook 2021 (#1–4)
- G.I. Joe: A Real American Hero: Silent Option Codename: Helix
- Synergy: A Hasbro Creators Showcase

=== Other ===
- G.I. Joe: A Real American Hero — Deviations
- G.I. Joe: A Real American Hero vs. The Six Million Dollar Man (#1–4, with Dynamite Entertainment)
- G.I. Joe: A Real American Hero — Complete Silence
- G.I. Joe: A Real American Hero — Serpentor Uncoiled
- G.I. Joe: A Real American Hero —Yo Joe!
- G.I. Joe: A Real American Hero — Cobraaaa!
- G.I. Joe: A Real American Hero — Saturday Morning Adventures (#1–4)
- G.I. Joe: A Real American Hero — Best of Snake Eyes
- G.I. Joe: A Real American Hero — Rise Of Serpentor
- G.I. Joe: A Real American Hero — Best of Storm Shadow

== Collected editions ==
The series has been collected in a number of trade paperbacks:

- Volume 1 (collects G.I. Joe: A Real American Hero #155 1/2, 156-160, February 2011, ISBN 978-1-60010-864-8)
- Volume 2 (collects G.I. Joe: A Real American Hero #161-165, 132 pages, July 2011, ISBN 978-1-60010-941-6)
- Volume 3 (collects G.I. Joe: A Real American Hero #166-170, 124 pages, December 2011, ISBN 978-1-61377-105-1)
- Volume 4 (collects G.I. Joe: A Real American Hero #171-175, 128 pages, June 2012, ISBN 978-1-61377-202-7)
- Volume 5 (collects G.I. Joe: A Real American Hero #176-180, 124 pages, October 2012, ISBN 978-1-61377-486-1)
- Volume 6 (collects G.I. Joe: A Real American Hero #181-185, 128 pages, April 2, 2013, ISBN 978-161377-582-0)
- Volume 7 (collects G.I. Joe: A Real American Hero #186-190, 128 pages, July 30, 2013, ISBN 978-161377-677-3)
- Volume 8 (collects G.I. Joe: A Real American Hero #191-195, 124 pages, Dec 17, 2013, ISBN 978-1613778265)
- Volume 9 (collects G.I. Joe: A Real American Hero #196-200, 132 pages, May 20, 2014, ISBN 978-161377-955-2)
- Volume 10 (collects G.I. Joe: A Real American Hero #201-205, 124 pages, November 25, 2014, ISBN 978-1631401541)
- Volume 11 (collects G.I. Joe: A Real American Hero #206-210, 124 pages, April 14, 2015 ISBN 978-1631402739)
- Volume 12 (collects G.I. Joe: A Real American Hero #211-215, 124 pages, September 29, 2015 ISBN 978-1631404061)
- Volume 13 (collects G.I. Joe: A Real American Hero #216–218 and the 2012 Annual, 116 pages, December 22, 2015, ISBN 978-1631404832)
- Volume 14 (collects G.I. Joe: A Real American Hero issues #219–221 & the prelude issue #0, 100 pages, March 29, 2016, ISBN 978-1631405549)
- Volume 15 (collects G.I. Joe: A Real American Hero #222–225, 100 pages, June 14, 2016, ISBN 978-1631406225)
- Volume 16 (collects G.I. Joe: A Real American Hero #226–230, 120 pages, October 18, 2016, ISBN 978-1631407321)
- Volume 17 (collects G.I. Joe: A Real American Hero #231–235, 120 pages, May 10, 2017, ISBN 978-1631408526)
- Volume 18 (collects G.I. Joe: A Real American Hero #236–240, 120 pages, September 12, 2017, ISBN 978-1631409592)
- Volume 19 (collects G.I. Joe: A Real American Hero #241–245, 120 pages, February 13, 2018, ISBN 978-1684051212)
- Volume 20 (collects G.I. Joe: A Real American Hero #246–250, 128 pages, June 26, 2018, ISBN 978-1684052578)
- Volume 21 (collects G.I. Joe: A Real American Hero #251–255, 128 pages, December 11, 2018, ISBN 978-1684053681)
- Volume 22 (collects G.I. Joe: A Real American Hero #256–260, 120 pages, May 14, 2019, ISBN 978-1684054343)
- Volume 23 (collects G.I. Joe: A Real American Hero #261–265, 120 pages, October 22, 2019, ISBN 978-1684055487)
- Volume 24 (collects G.I. Joe: A Real American Hero #266–275, 248 pages, February 16, 2021, ISBN 978-1684056231)
- Volume 25 (collects G.I. Joe: A Real American Hero #276–285, 240 pages, December 14, 2021, ISBN 978-1684058549)

A separate set of paperbacks collects these issues in larger volumes following the Classic G.I. Joe Marvel reprints listed in the previous section:

- Volume 16 (collects G.I. Joe: A Real American Hero #155 1/2-165, 268 pages, May 2015, ISBN 978-1-62302-785-8)
- Volume 17 (collects G.I. Joe: A Real American Hero #166-175, 245 pages, January 2016, ISBN 978-1-62302-893-0)
- Volume 18 (collects G.I. Joe: A Real American Hero #176-185, 246 pages, July 2016, ISBN 978-1-62302-992-0)
- Volume 19 (collects G.I. Joe: A Real American Hero #186-195, 244 pages, March 2017, ISBN 978-1-63140-812-0)
- Volume 20 (collects G.I. Joe: A Real American Hero #196-205, 244 pages, October 2017, ISBN 978-1-68405-004-8)

== See also ==
- G.I. Joe (IDW Publishing)
  - G.I. Joe: Cobra
  - G.I. Joe (2019 comic book)
  - Snake Eyes: Deadgame
- G.I. Joe: A Real American Hero
  - G.I. Joe: A Real American Hero (Marvel Comics)
  - G.I. Joe: A Real American Hero (Devil's Due Publishing)
  - G.I. Joe: A Real American Hero (Skybound Entertainment)
