= G.I. Joe (IDW Publishing) =

Comic book series

- Issue 1

Publication information
- Publisher: IDW Publishing
- Schedule: Weekly
- Genre: Military, science fiction
- Publication date: October 2008 – May 2015; August 2016 – March 2018
- No. of issues: 243 (36 IDW-wide crossovers)

Creative team
- Created by: Hasbro

G.I. Joe is a comic book series by IDW Publishing, based upon Hasbro's G.I. Joe characters and toy line.

The series was marketed as three ongoing series (G.I. Joe, G.I. Joe: Origins, G.I. Joe: Cobra II), two mini-series (G.I. Joe: Cobra and G.I. Joe: Hearts And Minds) and a small series of one-shots (G.I. Joe: Special). An issue #0, was released in October 2008, containing three stand-alone stories which acted as previews for the main G.I. Joe series, G.I. Joe: Origins, and G.I. Joe: Cobra. A new mini-series, G.I. Joe: Infestation was released in March 2011.

In the 12th issue of G.I. Joe: Cobra II, the original Cobra Commander was killed. This ended all three original ongoing series and resulted in a stand-alone G.I. Joe: Cobra Civil War #0. This issue spawned two new G.I. Joe and G.I. Joe: Cobra ongoing series, and a G.I. Joe: Snake Eyes ongoing series which took the storyline into a new direction.

IDW's approach to G.I. Joe is similar to their launch of The Transformers, where the history is rebooted and the creators have access to characters from any era of the G.I. Joe: A Real American Hero line.

== Licensing ==
Devil's Due Publishing lost the G.I. Joe comics license in January 2008, and published their last G.I. Joe comic in July with G.I. Joe: America's Elite #36. The license was then given to IDW Publishing, which was officially announced on May 29 the same year. IDW's G.I. Joe series is a complete reboot of the property, ignoring the continuity from the Marvel and Devil's Due incarnations of the comic.

When IDW began publishing a continuation of A Real American Hero from Marvel Comics separately, Hasbro said that the Devil's Due continuity was no longer canonical: "Fans can read it according to their personal preference, but we are currently taking the brand in a direction that does not take the Devil’s Due story into account".

IDW lost the license rights by the end of 2022 and Skybound Entertainment obtained those for 2023.

== Main canon continuity (2008–2018) ==
=== First series ===
G.I. Joe #0 alternate cover. Artwork by Jonboy Meyers.

Issue #0 was released in October 2008, containing three stand-alone stories which acted as previews for the main G.I. Joe series, G.I. Joe: Origins and G.I. Joe: Cobra. It was originally solicited as G.I. Joe: A New Beginning #0.

- G.I. Joe (vol. 1)

The main series of the new IDW continuity of G.I. Joe. It chronicles the new conflict between the G.I. Joe Team and Cobra as presented by the new IDW continuity. Contrary to what was initially believed, original G.I. Joe comic writer Larry Hama is not the writer for this series. Instead, veteran comic book writer Chuck Dixon is penning this series. 27 issues were released. In addition, a G.I. Joe: Special was published that was to be an ongoing series of one-shot issues. Each comic was to serve to focus on a particular character in the continuity established by IDW. The series was to be done with rotating creative teams. However, the series had only seen one issue - a Helix issue (August 2009). It seems now that many of the stories intended to take place in Special issues were transferred over to the Origins series.

- G.I. Joe: Origins

A mini-series that later became an ongoing series. The series was penned by original G.I. Joe writer Larry Hama, who was initially thought to be the scribe for the main series. The series explores the formation of G.I. Joe and the personalities that make up the team. 23 issues were released.

- G.I. Joe: Cobra (vol. 1)

A four-issue mini-series that details the status quo of Cobra for the continuity by IDW as Joe member Chuckles spies on the threat. The story is written by Christos Gage and Mike Costa and art by Antonio Fuso. The covers are illustrated by Howard Chaykin. The story was continued with a one-shot as part of the G.I. Joe: Cobra: Special series. The story focused on Tomax and Xamot.

- G.I. Joe: Cobra II

Originally a four-issue mini-series, which was a direct continuation from the previous Cobra mini-series and one-shot special. It was then continued as an ongoing series titled G.I. Joe: Cobra (without the II), starting with #5. 13 issues were released. In addition, during this time, a second G.I. Joe: Cobra: Special was published with the focus being on Chameleon.

- G.I. Joe: Hearts And Minds

A five-issue mini-series, written by Max Brooks. Each issue focuses on two stories, each a day in the life of a Joe and a Cobra.

- G.I. Joe: Infestation

A two-issue mini-series. The two-issue IDW mini-series Infestation, which started in January 2011, is in essence a two-part bookend story, with the first issue showing the origins of the event in G.I. Joe: Infestation and the second finishing up the story after the G.I. Joe series. There was some connection in the final issue of Infestation with other IDW properties like Transformers, Star Trek and Ghostbusters.

=== Second series ===
- G.I. Joe: Cobra Civil War

Released in April 2011. It was released as an issue #0, which was the starting point for two new ongoing series, G.I. Joe and G.I. Joe: Cobra, and a G.I. Joe: Snake Eyes ongoing series, all launched the next month.

- G.I. Joe (vol. 2)

Started in May 2011. It was the second regular G.I. Joe ongoing series and starts from the G.I. Joe: Cobra Civil War #0, with the previous G.I. Joe series ending after the death of Cobra commander. 21 issues were released.

- G.I. Joe: Cobra (vol. 3)

Started in May 2011. It was the third Cobra series and the second ongoing that starts from the G.I. Joe: Cobra Civil War #0, with the previous Cobra series ending after the death of Cobra commander. 21 issues were released. (IDW considers this series to be volume two.) In addition, a one-shot issue was published, titled Cobra Annual 2012: The Origin of Cobra Commander, that explores the origins of the new Cobra Commander.

- G.I. Joe: Snake Eyes (and Storm Shadow)

Started in May 2011. It starts from the G.I. Joe: Cobra Civil War #0. Starting with issue 13, the title of the series was changed to G.I. Joe: Snake Eyes And Storm Shadow. 21 issues were released.

- Infestation 2: G.I. Joe

A two-issue mini-series which was released in March 2012. The two-issue IDW mini-series Infestation 2, which started in January 2012, is in essence a two-part bookend story, with the first issue showing the origins of the event that continues within Infestation 2: G.I. Joe and the second finishing up the story after the G.I. Joe series. There are some connections in the final issue of Infestation 2 to other IDW titles such as Transformers, 30 Days of Night, Dungeons & Dragons, Teenage Mutant Ninja Turtles and Danger Girl.

=== Third series ===
Starting in February 2013, three new G.I. Joe ongoing series were launched to replace the old ones.

- G.I. Joe (vol. 3)

Started in February 2013. It is the third regular G.I. Joe ongoing series. 15 issues were released.

- G.I. Joe: Special Missions

Started in March 2013. 14 issues were released.

- G.I. Joe: The Cobra Files

Started in April 2013. It was the fourth Cobra series and the third ongoing. Nine issues were released.

=== Fourth series ===
- G.I. Joe: The Fall of G.I. Joe (vol. 4)

Started in September 2014. Karen Traviss wrote the main title. Eight issues were released.

- Snake Eyes: Agent of Cobra

A five-issue series written by Mike Costa and released starting in January 2015.

=== Fifth series ===
- Revolution

The IDW iteration of G.I. Joe returned in the 5-issue crossover event with Transformers, Action Man, M.A.S.K., Rom, and Micronauts. The series was published bi-weekly starting in September 2016. It was preceded by the Revolution: Prelude issue in August. In addition to the 5-issue main series and the prelude issue, there were eight one-shot issues related to the Revolution event, one of which focused on the G.I. Joe team specifically.

- G.I. Joe (vol. 5)

A new ongoing series of G.I. Joe started publishing in December 2016. Nine issues were released.

- Revolutionaries

Continuing from the Revolution crossover mini-series, Revolutionaries is an ongoing series that started in December 2016. The comic sees the appearance of major characters from various IDW comics, with the core team including the G.I. Joe member Mayday. Eight issues were released

- M.A.S.K.: Mobile Armored Strike Kommand Annual 2017

A one-shot issue that saw both the M.A.S.K. and G.I. Joe teams join forces against the criminal organization known as V.E.N.O.M.

- First Strike

The 6-issue crossover event, which is a sequel to Revolution, started publishing in August 2017. Once again, the crossover includes Transformers, Action Man, M.A.S.K., Rom, and Micronauts, with six one-shots related to the crossover. First Strike was preceded by a zero issue in June.

- Scarlett's Strike Force

This comic started in December 2017, following the events of First Strike and saw the uniting of G.I. Joe and M.A.S.K.. Eight issues were initially planned, but the series was cancelled after the third issue.

=== Chronological comic order ===
This is a chronological order of the IDW-continuity comics per which the timeline of events developed, as given in the trade paperback collections.

1-5. G.I. Joe: Origins #1-5

6-9. G.I. Joe: Origins #6-7
10-11. G.I. Joe: Origins #8-11
12-15. G.I. Joe: Origins #12-15
16-20. G.I. Joe: Origins #19-23
21. G.I. Joe #0
22. G.I. Joe: Origins #16
23-31. G.I. Joe #1-9
32-33. G.I. Joe: Origins #17-18
34-40. G.I. Joe #10-16
41-44. G.I. Joe: Cobra #1-4
45. G.I. Joe: Helix
46. G.I. Joe: Cobra Special #1
47-54. G.I. Joe #17-24
55-58. G.I. Joe: Cobra II #1-4
59-63. G.I. Joe: Hearts & Minds #1-5
64-68. G.I. Joe: Cobra #5-9
69. G.I. Joe: Cobra Special #2
70-71. G.I. Joe: Infestation #1-2
72-74. G.I. Joe #25-27
75-78. G.I. Joe: Cobra #10-13
79. G.I. Joe: Cobra Civil War #0
80. G.I. Joe Vol. 2 #1
81. G.I. Joe: Cobra Vol. 3 #1
82. G.I. Joe Vol. 2 #2
83. G.I. Joe: Cobra Vol. 3 #2
84-86. G.I. Joe: Snake Eyes #1-3
87-88. G.I. Joe Vol. 2 #3-4
89. G.I. Joe: Snake Eyes #4
90-93. G.I. Joe: Cobra Vol. 3 #3-6
94. G.I. Joe: Snake Eyes #5
95-97. G.I. Joe Vol. 2 #5-7
98-100. G.I. Joe: Snake Eyes #6-8
101-102. G.I. Joe: Cobra Vol. 3 #7-8
103. G.I. Joe Vol. 2 #8
104. Cobra Annual 2012: The Origin of Cobra Commander
105-106. Infes2ation #1-2
107-118. G.I. Joe - Cobra Command #1-12 (contains G.I. Joe Vol. 2 #9-12, G.I. Joe: Cobra Vol. 3 #9-12 & G.I. Joe: Snake Eyes #9-12)
119-123. G.I. Joe Vol. 2 #13-17
124-127. G.I. Joe: Cobra Vol. 3 #13-16
128-131. G.I. Joe: Snake Eyes And Storm Shadow #13-16
132-136. G.I. Joe: Cobra Vol. 3 #17-21
137. G.I. Joe: Snake Eyes And Storm Shadow #17
138-143. G.I. Joe - Target Snake Eyes #1-6 (contains G.I. Joe Vol. 2 #18-20 & G.I. Joe: Snake Eyes #18-20)
144. G.I. Joe Vol. 2 #21
145. G.I. Joe: Snake Eyes And Storm Shadow #21
146-149. G.I. Joe: Special Missions #1-4
150-154. G.I. Joe Vol. 3 #1-5
155-158. G.I. Joe: The Cobra Files #1-4
159-163. G.I. Joe: Special Missions #5-9
164-169. G.I. Joe Vol. 3 #6-11
170-174. G.I. Joe: The Cobra Files #5-9
175-179. G.I. Joe: Special Missions #10-14
180-183. G.I. Joe Vol. 3 #12-15
184-191. G.I. Joe: The Fall of G.I. Joe (Vol. 4) #1-8
192-196. Snake Eyes: Agent of Cobra #1-5
197-210. Revolution (Prelude; M.A.S.K.; ROM; Till All Are One; #1-2; Micronauts; #3; G.I. Joe; Transformers; Action Man; #4; More Than Meets the Eye & #5)
211-215. G.I. Joe Vol. 5 #1-5
216-220. Revolutionaries #1-5
221. M.A.S.K.: Mobile Armored Strike Kommand Annual 2017
222-225. G.I. Joe Vol. 5 #6-9
226-228. Revolutionaries #6-8
229-240. First Strike (contains #0-1; Optimus Prime; #2-6; Transformers; Micronauts; ROM; G.I. Joe; M.A.S.K.)

241-243. Scarlett's Strike Force #1-3

=== Tales from the Cobra Wars: A G.I. Joe Anthology ===
Tales from the Cobra Wars: A G.I. Joe Anthology is an anthology of prose stories based on several G.I. Joe stories related to the Hasbro Comic Book Universe. It was edited by Max Brooks and released by IDW on April 19, 2011.

== Alternate universes ==
In addition to the stories set in its central continuity, IDW has also released comics set in other continuities.

=== Film comic series ===
IDW Publishing published several G.I. Joe comic series based upon the 2009 film, G.I. Joe: The Rise of Cobra:

- G.I. Joe Movie Prequel

A four-part limited series acting as a prequel to the 2009 movie, G.I. Joe: The Rise of Cobra, published from March to June 2009, written by Chuck Dixon. Each issue featured a different character from the movie (Duke, Destro, The Baroness and Snake Eyes respectively).

- G.I. Joe Movie Adaptation

A four-part limited series published in July 2009 and written by Chuck Dixon, adapting the 2009 movie.

- Snake Eyes

A four-part Snake-Eyes solo limited series co-written by Ray Park (October 2009 - January 2010).

- G.I. Joe: Operation HISS

A four-part limited series that was published from February to June 2010. The first issue is a reprint of the comic distributed through Game Stop retail stores, which bridges the gap between the movie and the EA video game that followed.

- G.I. Joe: Retaliation Movie Prequel

A four-part limited series published from February to April 2012 and written by John Barber, acting as a prequel to the second 2013 movie.

=== G.I. Joe: A Real American Hero ===
G.I. Joe: A Real American Hero is a continuation of the Marvel Comics series of the same name published from 1982 to 1994. It continued the numbering from the original Marvel series, starting with issue #155 ½, published on Free Comic Book Day in May 2010, followed by #156 and onward in July. It is written by Larry Hama, who wrote the original Marvel series, and ignores the events of the earlier Devil's Due continuation.

The series has been collected in a number of trade paperbacks:

- Volume 1 (collects G.I. Joe: A Real American Hero #155 1/2, 156–160, February 2011, ISBN 978-1-60010-864-8)
- Volume 2 (collects G.I. Joe: A Real American Hero #161-165, 132 pages, July 2011, ISBN 978-1-60010-941-6)
- Volume 3 (collects G.I. Joe: A Real American Hero #166-170, 124 pages, December 2011, ISBN 978-1-61377-105-1)
- Volume 4 (collects G.I. Joe: A Real American Hero #171-175, 128 pages, June 2012, ISBN 978-1-61377-202-7)
- Volume 5 (collects G.I. Joe: A Real American Hero #176-180, 124 pages, October 2012, ISBN 978-1-61377-486-1)
- Volume 6 (collects G.I. Joe: A Real American Hero #181-185, 128 pages, April 2, 2013, ISBN 978-161377-582-0)
- Volume 7 (collects G.I. Joe: A Real American Hero #186-190, 128 pages, July 30, 2013, ISBN 978-161377-677-3)
- Volume 8 (collects G.I. Joe: A Real American Hero #191-195, 124 pages, Dec 17, 2013, ISBN 978-1613778265)
- Volume 9 (collects G.I. Joe: A Real American Hero #196-200, 132 pages, May 20, 2014, ISBN 978-161377-955-2)
- Volume 10 (collects G.I. Joe: A Real American Hero #201-205, 124 pages, November 25, 2014, ISBN 978-1631401541)
- Volume 11 (collects G.I. Joe: A Real American Hero #206-210, 124 pages, April 14, 2015 ISBN 978-1631402739)
- Volume 12 (collects G.I. Joe: A Real American Hero #211-215, 124 pages, September 29, 2015 ISBN 978-1631404061)
- Volume 13 (collects G.I. Joe: A Real American Hero #216–218 and the 2012 Annual, 116 pages, December 22, 2015, ISBN 978-1631404832)
- Volume 14 (collects G.I. Joe: A Real American Hero issues #219–221 & the prelude issue #0, 100 pages, March 29, 2016, ISBN 978-1631405549)
- Volume 15 (collects G.I. Joe: A Real American Hero #222–225, 100 pages, June 14, 2016, ISBN 978-1631406225)
- Volume 16 (collects G.I. Joe: A Real American Hero #226–230, 120 pages, October 18, 2016, ISBN 978-1631407321)
- Volume 17 (collects G.I. Joe: A Real American Hero #231–235, 120 pages, May 10, 2017, ISBN 978-1631408526)
- Volume 18 (collects G.I. Joe: A Real American Hero #236–240, 120 pages, September 12, 2017, ISBN 978-1631409592)
- Volume 19 (collects G.I. Joe: A Real American Hero #241–245, 120 pages, February 13, 2018, ISBN 978-1684051212)
- Volume 20 (collects G.I. Joe: A Real American Hero #246–250, 128 pages, June 26, 2018, ISBN 978-1684052578)
- Volume 21 (collects G.I. Joe: A Real American Hero #251–255, 128 pages, December 11, 2018, ISBN 978-1684053681)
- Volume 22 (collects G.I. Joe: A Real American Hero #256–260, 120 pages, May 14, 2019, ISBN 978-1684054343)
- Volume 23 (collects G.I. Joe: A Real American Hero #261–265, 120 pages, October 22, 2019, ISBN 978-1684055487)

A separate set of paperbacks collects these issues in larger volumes following the Classic G.I. Joe Marvel reprints listed in the previous section:

- Volume 16 (collects G.I. Joe: A Real American Hero #155 1/2-165, 268 pages, May 2015, ISBN 978-1-62302-785-8)
- Volume 17 (collects G.I. Joe: A Real American Hero #166-175, 245 pages, January 2016, ISBN 978-1-62302-893-0)
- Volume 18 (collects G.I. Joe: A Real American Hero #176-185, 246 pages, July 2016, ISBN 978-1-62302-992-0)
- Volume 19 (collects G.I. Joe: A Real American Hero #186-195, 244 pages, March 2017, ISBN 978-1-63140-812-0)
- Volume 20 (collects G.I. Joe: A Real American Hero #196-205, 244 pages, October 2017, ISBN 978-1-68405-004-8)

=== G.I. Joe: Future Noir ===
The G.I. Joe: Future Noir series consisted of two issues set in their own continuity, written by Andy Schmidt and drawn by Giacomo Bevilacqua.

Collected as:

- G.I. Joe: Future Noir Volume 1 (collects G.I. Joe: Future Noir #1-2, 120 pages, February 2011, ISBN 978-1-60010-865-5)

=== G.I. Joe: Renegades ===
The G.I. Joe: Renegades is set in the cartoon universe and was released in 2011.

=== Street Fighter × G.I. Joe ===
In 2016, IDW published a crossover with Capcom's Street Fighter titled Street Fighter × G.I. Joe. It was written by Aubrey Sitterson with art by Emilio Laiso, and ran for six issues.

=== G.I. Joe: Sierra Muerte ===
A three-issue limited series by Michel Fiffe alongside Chad Bowers, running from February 8 to April 24, 2019.

=== 2019 series ===
- G.I. Joe (vol. 6)

In August 2018, IDW's former President Greg Goldstein announced the possibility for a new G.I. Joe comic book series for 2019. In July 2019, IDW officially announced the new G.I. Joe comic book series to debut in September 2019, written by Paul Allor and drawn by Chris Evenhuis.

- G.I. Joe: Castle Fall

The one-shot finale of 2019's G.I. Joe comic book, released on February 17, 2021.

=== Snake Eyes: Deadgame ===
Snake Eyes: Deadgame was announced in July 2019, and will be co-written and co-drawn by Rob Liefeld. He considered Snake Eyes as both an icon and "bucket list" for him, stating the character is "Wolverine, Deadpool and Spider-Man rolled into one amazing character for an entire generation of fans that thrilled to his adventures in comics and cartoons and hung on his every toy release! My parents drove me all over the county to get me G.I. Joe action figures as a kid. These were my first and most favorite toys. Working with Hasbro and all my friends at IDW has been a blast so far. I can’t wait to get this work out into the public! If you enjoyed my recent Marvel work, this will match or exceed it!"

== Collected editions ==
=== Trade paperback editions ===
The following is a table list of the trade paperback editions of the new IDW-continuity issues.

Title	Volume	Collected material	Pages	Release date	ISBN
G.I. Joe (2009)	1	G.I. Joe #0–6		June 24, 2009	
G.I. Joe: Origins Vol. 01	2	G.I. Joe: Origins #1–5		September 2, 2009	
G.I. Joe: Cobra Vol. 01	3	G.I. Joe: Cobra #1–4 & G.I. Joe: Cobra Special #1		October 28, 2009	
G.I. Joe Vol. 02	4	G.I. Joe #7–12		February 17, 2010	
G.I. Joe: Origins Vol. 02	5	G.I. Joe: Origins #6-10		March 10, 2010	
G.I. Joe Vol. 03	6	G.I. Joe #13–17 & G.I. Joe: Helix Special		July 14, 2010	
G.I. Joe: Origins Vol. 03	7	G.I. Joe: Origins #11–15		August 4, 2010	
G.I. Joe: Hearts And Minds	8	G.I. Joe: Hearts And Minds #1–5		November 10, 2010	
G.I. Joe: Cobra Vol. 02	9	G.I. Joe: Cobra II #1–4		November 17, 2010	
G.I. Joe Vol. 04	10	G.I. Joe #18–22		December 15, 2010	
G.I. Joe: Origins Vol. 04	11	G.I. Joe: Origins #16–19		January 5, 2011	
G.I. Joe: Cobra Vol. 03 - Serpent's Coil	12	G.I. Joe: Cobra II #5–9		March 2, 2011	
G.I. Joe: Cobra Vol. 04 - The Death of Cobra Commander	13	G.I. Joe: Cobra II #10–13 & G.I. Joe: Cobra Special #2		June 8, 2011	
G.I. Joe Vol. 05	14	G.I. Joe #23–27		August 3, 2011	
Infestation Vol. 01	15	G.I. Joe: Infestation #1–2		August 10, 2011	
G.I. Joe: Origins Vol. 05	16	G.I. Joe: Origins #20–23		September 7, 2011	
G.I. Joe - Cobra Civil War Vol. 1	17	G.I. Joe (vol. 2) #0–4		October 12, 2011	
G.I. Joe: Snake Eyes - Cobra Civil War Vol. 1	18	G.I. Joe: Snake Eyes #1–4		November 16, 2011	
G.I. Joe: Cobra - Cobra Civil War Vol. 1	19	G.I. Joe: Cobra (vol. 3) #1–4		December 7, 2011	
G.I. Joe - Cobra Civil War Vol. 2	20	G.I. Joe (vol. 2) #5–8		February 22, 2012	
G.I. Joe: Snake Eyes - Cobra Civil War Vol. 2	21	G.I. Joe: Snake Eyes #5–8		March 14, 2012	
G.I. Joe: Cobra - Cobra Civil War Vol. 2	22	G.I. Joe: Cobra (vol. 3) #5–8		May 1, 2012	
G.I. Joe - Cobra Command Vol. 1	23	G.I. Joe (vol. 2) #9–10, G.I. Joe: Snake Eyes #9 & G.I. Joe: Cobra (vol. 3) #9		June 6, 2012	
G.I. Joe - Cobra Command Vol. 2	24	G.I. Joe (vol. 2) #11, G.I. Joe: Snake Eyes #10–11 & G.I. Joe: Cobra (vol. 3) #10–11		July 4, 2012	
G.I. Joe - Cobra Command Vol. 3 - Aftermath	25	G.I. Joe (vol. 2) #12, G.I. Joe: Snake Eyes #12, G.I. Joe: Cobra (vol. 3) #12 & Cobra Annual 2012		August 8, 2012	
G.I. Joe - Deep Terror	26	G.I. Joe (vol. 2) #13–17		November 7, 2012	
G.I. Joe: Snake Eyes/Storm Shadow Vol. 1	27	G.I. Joe: Snake Eyes & Storm Shadow #13–17		December 25, 2012	
G.I. Joe: Cobra - Son of the Snake	28	G.I. Joe: Cobra (vol. 3) #13–16		January 22, 2013	
G.I. Joe - Target Snake Eyes	29	G.I. Joe (vol. 2) #18–20 & G.I. Joe: Snake Eyes & Storm Shadow #18–20		March 19, 2013	
G.I. Joe: Cobra - Oktober Guard	30	G.I. Joe: Cobra (vol. 3) #17–21		April 17, 2013	
G.I. Joe Vol. 01 - Homefront	31	G.I. Joe (vol. 3) #1–5		August 7, 2013	
G.I. Joe: Cobra Files Vol. 01	32	G.I. Joe: Cobra Files #1–4		September 4, 2013	
G.I. Joe: Special Missions Vol. 01	33	G.I. Joe: Special Missions #1–4		October 9, 2013	
G.I. Joe: Special Missions Vol. 02	34	G.I. Joe: Special Missions #5–9		January 15, 2014	
G.I. Joe Vol. 02 - Threat Matrix	35	G.I. Joe (vol. 3) #6–11		February 12, 2014	
G.I. Joe: Cobra Files Vol. 02	36	G.I. Joe: Cobra Files #5–9		March 5, 2014	
G.I. Joe: Special Missions Vol. 03	37	G.I. Joe: Special Missions #10–14		June 25, 2014	
G.I. Joe Vol. 03 - Siren's Song	38	G.I. Joe (vol. 3) #12–15		July 2, 2014	
G.I. Joe - The Fall Of G.I. Joe Vol. 01	39	G.I. Joe - The Fall Of G.I. Joe (vol. 4) #1–4		February 25, 2015	
G.I. Joe - The Fall Of G.I. Joe Vol. 02	40	G.I. Joe - The Fall Of G.I. Joe (vol. 4) #5–8		July 15, 2015	
Snake Eyes: Agent of Cobra	41	Snake Eyes: Agent of Cobra #1–5		August 27, 2015	
Revolution	42	Revolution: Prelude & Revolution #1–5		February 8, 2017	
G.I. Joe Vol. 01	43	G.I. Joe: Revolution & G.I. Joe (vol. 5) #1–4		July 19, 2017	
Revolutionaries Vol. 01 - Crisis Intervention	44	Revolutionaries #1–5		August 2, 2017	
Revolutionaries Vol. 02 - Power & Glory	45	Revolutionaries #6–8		November 15, 2017	
G.I. Joe Vol. 02	46	G.I. Joe (vol. 5) #5–8		November 29, 2017	
Transformers/G.I. JOE: First Strike	47	First Strike #0–6		February 20, 2018	
Transformers/G.I. JOE: First Strike Champions	48	Trade paperback collecting the First Strike one shots: G.I. Joe, M.A.S.K., Micronauts, Optimus Prime, ROM and Transformers.		February 20, 2018	
Scarlett's Strike Force	49	G.I. Joe: First Strike, M.A.S.K.: First Strike & Scarlett's Strike Force #1–3		June 12, 2018	

=== Reprints ===
IDW began printing trade paperback collections off the original Marvel Comics series starting in January 2009. The reprints contain ten issues each, retaining the originals full color. They have also begun reprinting the Devil's Due series (under the Disavowed brand), the Marvel G.I. Joe: Special Missions series, and the G.I. Joe: Yearbooks.

A list of reprints:

- Classic G.I. Joe:
  - Volume 1 (collects G.I. Joe: A Real American Hero #1-10, 240 pages, January 2009, 978-1-60010-345-2)
  - Volume 2 (collects G.I. Joe: A Real American Hero #11-20, 240 pages, March 2009, 978-1-60010-379-7)
  - Volume 3 (collects G.I. Joe: A Real American Hero #21-30, 240 pages, May 2009, 978-1-60010-423-7)
  - Volume 4 (collects G.I. Joe: A Real American Hero #31-40, 240 pages, July 2009, 978-1-60010-462-6)
  - Volume 5 (collects G.I. Joe: A Real American Hero #41-50, 236 pages, September 2009, 978-1-60010-519-7)
  - Volume 6 (collects G.I. Joe: A Real American Hero #51-60, 240 pages, December 2009, 978-1-60010-545-6)
  - Volume 7 (collects G.I. Joe: A Real American Hero #61-70, 232 pages, March 2010, 978-1-60010-598-2)
  - Volume 8 (collects G.I. Joe: A Real American Hero #71-80, 256 pages, June 2010, 978-1-60010-655-2)
  - Volume 9 (collects G.I. Joe: A Real American Hero #81-90, 252 pages, September 2010, 978-1-60010-706-1)
  - Volume 10 (collects G.I. Joe: A Real American Hero #91-100, 240 pages, January 2011, 978-1-60010-791-7)
  - Volume 11 (collects G.I. Joe: A Real American Hero #101-110, 240 pages, May 2011, 978-1-60010-875-4)
  - Volume 12 (collects G.I. Joe: A Real American Hero #111-123, 288 pages, August 2011, 978-1-60010-972-0)
  - Volume 13 (collects G.I. Joe: A Real American Hero #124-134, 236 pages, November 2011, 978-1-61377-082-5)
  - Volume 14 (collects G.I. Joe: A Real American Hero #135-145, 256 pages, April 2012, 978-1-61377-153-2)
  - Volume 15 (collects G.I. Joe: A Real American Hero #146-155, 248 pages, August 2012, 978-1-61377-274-4)
- G.I. Joe: Special Missions:
  - Volume 1 (collects G.I. Joe: Special Missions #1-7, 172 pages, July 2010, 978-1-60010-676-7)
  - Volume 2 (collects G.I. Joe: Special Missions #8-14, 172 pages, October 2010, 978-1-60010-758-0)
  - Volume 3 (collects G.I. Joe: Special Missions #15-21, 172 pages, March 2011, 978-1-60010-849-5)
  - Volume 4 (collects G.I. Joe: Special Missions #22-28, 156 pages, September 2011, 978-1-60010-959-1)
- G.I. Joe: Yearbook (collects G.I. Joe: Yearbook #1-4, 264 pages, March 2012, 978-1-61377-121-1)
- G.I. Joe/Transformers:
  - Volume 1 (collects G.I. Joe and the Transformers #1-4 and G.I. Joe: A Real American Hero #139-142, 192 pages, September 2012, 978-1-61377-352-9)
  - Volume 2 (collects G.I. Joe vs. the Transformers #1-6 and G.I. Joe vs. the Transformers II #1-4, 248 pages, December 2012, 978-1-61377-535-6)
- G.I. Joe: The Complete Collection:
  - Volume 1 (collects G.I. Joe: A Real American Hero #1-12, 300 pages, November 2012, 978-1613773963)
  - Volume 2 (collects G.I. Joe: A Real American Hero #13-24, 312 pages, June 2013 978-1613776193)
  - Volume 3 (collects G.I. Joe: A Real American Hero #25-33, G.I. JOE Yearbook #1, 312 pages, October 2013, 978-1613777060)
  - Volume 4 (collects G.I. Joe: A Real American Hero #34-45, 312 pages, January 2014, 978-1613778487)
  - Volume 5 (collects G.I. Joe: A Real American Hero #46–53, Special Missions #1–2, and Yearbook #2, 308 pages, August 12, 2014,978-1613779569)
  - Volume 6 (collects G.I. Joe: A Real American Hero #54-60, Special Missions #3-5, and Yearbook #3, 312 pages, December 16, 2014, 978-1631401244)
  - Volume 7 (collects G.I. Joe: A Real American Hero #61-67, Special Missions #6-9, and Yearbook #4, 352 pages, June 9, 2015, 978-1631401244)
  - Volume 8 (collects G.I. Joe: A Real American Hero #68–76, and Special Missions #10–13, 340 pages, January 12, 2016, 978-1631404825)
  - Volume 9 (collects G.I. Joe: A Real American Hero #77-83 and Special Missions #14–19, 356 pages, May 17, 2016, 978-1631406072)
- G.I. Joe: Disavowed:
  - Volume 1 (collects G.I. Joe: A Real American Hero (vol. 2) #1-5, 142 pages, June 2010, 978-1-60010-658-3)
  - Volume 2 (collects G.I. Joe: A Real American Hero (vol. 2) #6-13, 192 pages, January 2011, 978-1-60010-796-2)
  - Volume 3 (collects G.I. Joe: A Real American Hero (vol. 2) #14-19, 144 pages, May 2011, 978-1-60010-901-0)
  - Volume 4 (collects G.I. Joe: A Real American Hero (vol. 2) #20-26, 162 pages, October 2011, 978-1-61377-046-7)
  - Volume 5 (collects G.I. Joe: A Real American Hero (vol. 2) #27-32, 136 pages, March 2012, 978-1-61377-133-4)
  - Volume 6 (collects G.I. Joe: A Real American Hero (vol. 2) #33-38, 124 pages, August 2012, 978-1-61377-222-5)
  - Volume 7 (collects G.I. Joe: A Real American Hero (vol. 2) #39-43, 164 pages, March 2013, 978-1-61377-562-2)
- G.I. Joe: America's Elite: Disavowed:
  - Volume 1 (collects G.I. Joe: America's Elite #0-6, 340 pages, November 2013, 978-1-61377-704-6)
  - Volume 2 (collects G.I. Joe: America's Elite #7-12, 148 pages, December 2013, 978-1-61377-827-2)
  - Volume 3 (collects G.I. Joe: America's Elite #13-18, 140 pages, April 2014, 978-1-61377-930-9)
  - Volume 4 (collects G.I. Joe: America's Elite #19-24, 136 pages, August 2014, 978-1-63140-078-0)
  - Volume 5 (collects G.I. Joe: America's Elite #25-30, 156 pages, December 2014, 978-1-63140-170-1)
  - Volume 6 (collects G.I. Joe: America's Elite #31-36, 156 pages, June 2015, 978-1-63140-320-0)

== See also ==
- G.I. Joe (Skybound Entertainment)
