= Snake Eyes (G.I. Joe) =

Fictional character from the G.I. Joe franchise

- G.I. Joe character
- Snake Eyes in a variation of his version 2 suit
- First appearance: G.I. Joe: A Real American Hero #1 (June 1982)
- Voiced by: Jake Parker (Spy Troops); P.J. Johal (Valor vs. Venom); Danny Cooksey (Renegades)

In-universe information
- Affiliation: G.I. Joe
- Specialty: Commando; Covert Mission Specialist (2004–2007); Ninja (2008); Ninja Commando (2009–2020); ARMA Program manager (2020–present)
- File name: Classified
- Birth place: Classified
- SN: Classified
- Rank: E-5 (Sergeant); E-7 (Sergeant First Class) (1989–2008); E-8 (Master Sergeant) (Devil's Due comics); Classified (2009–)
- Primary MOS: Infantry
- Secondary MOS: Hand-to-hand Combat Instructor
- Subgroups: Ninja Force; Shadow Ninjas

Snake Eyes (also known as Snake-Eyes) is a fictional character from the G.I. Joe: A Real American Hero toyline, comic books, and animated series, created by Larry Hama. He is one of the original and most popular members of the G.I. Joe Team, and is most known for his relationships with Scarlett and Storm Shadow. Snake Eyes is one of the most prominent characters in the G.I. Joe: A Real American Hero franchise, having appeared in every series of the franchise since its inception. He is portrayed by Ray Park in the 2009 live-action film G.I. Joe: The Rise of Cobra, and the 2013 sequel G.I. Joe: Retaliation. Henry Golding portrays the titular character in the 2021 reboot Snake Eyes: G.I. Joe Origins.

== Profile ==
Snake Eyes is the code name of a member of the G.I. Joe Team. He is the team's original commando, and much of the history and information about his personal life and military service, including his birth name, place of birth and service number, have stayed classified or top secret throughout all depictions of his origin and his military career. All that is known for certain is his rank/grade (originally U.S. Army Sergeant/E-5, eventually reaching Sergeant First Class/E-7 before it too was deemed classified), his primary military specialty is infantry, and his secondary military specialty is hand-to-hand combat instructor. Snake Eyes was trained at the Military Assistance Command, Vietnam (MACV) Recondo School (Nha Trang), and served in long-range reconnaissance patrol (LRRP) in Southeast Asia with Stalker and Storm Shadow, eventually leaving the service to study martial arts with Storm Shadow's Arashikage ninja clan. He has undergone drill sergeant training, and is a former U.S. Army Special Forces and Delta Force operator. Very little else about his past is known. Basically, all of the intelligence about both his military career and his personal life, including his birth name, birthplace, and childhood has been designated as classified or top secret because of the clandestine military operations that he was participating in.

Snake Eyes was living a life of strict self-denial and seclusion in the High Sierra with a pet wolf named Timber when he was recruited for the G.I. Joe Team. He is an expert in all NATO and Warsaw Pact small arms and has black belts in 12 different fighting systems including Karate, Judo, Jujutsu, Kung-Fu, Taekwondo, Muay Thai, Ninjutsu, Krav Maga, Savate, Silat, Jeet Kune Do, and Kobudo. He is highly skilled in the use of edged weapons, especially his Japanese sword and spike-knuckled trench knives, but he is equally qualified with and willing to use firearms and explosives. Snake Eyes is a ninja master who is quiet in his movements and rarely relies on one set of weapons to the exclusion of others.

During one of his first missions for G.I. Joe, Snake Eyes' face was severely disfigured in a helicopter explosion. Since then, Snake Eyes has had extensive plastic surgery to repair the damage, but his vocal cords cannot be repaired. He usually wears a black bodysuit, along with a balaclava and visor to cover his face. When out of his uniform, Snake Eyes is shown to be a white man with an athletic build, blonde hair, and blue eyes.

Snake Eyes has been shown in most continuities to be romantically involved with fellow team member Scarlett. He has also had several apprentices, including Kamakura, Tiger Claw, and Jinx. His personal quote is "Move with the wind, and you will never be heard."

== Toyline ==
Reproduction of the 1982 Snake Eyes toy packaging art ("version 1" uniform)

Snake Eyes was one of the original figures in the G.I. Joe: A Real American Hero toyline in 1982. He shared many parts with other figures of that series, except for his unique head sculpt. He was designed to save Hasbro money in the paint application process, as his first figure was made of black plastic with no paint applied for details, and his head did not require any detail because of the mask. All of the original sixteen figures from 1982 were released with "straight arms". The same figure was re-released in 1983 with "swivel-arm battle grip", which made it possible for figures to "hold" their rifles and accessories in a more naturally human pose, as the forearm could now rotate 360 degrees.

A second version of Snake Eyes was released in 1985, packaged with his wolf Timber. A third version of Snake Eyes was released in 1989, and a fourth version in 1991. Snake Eyes has also been released as a member of several sub-lines of G.I. Joe figures, such as Ninja Force (1993) and Shadow Ninjas (1994). He has also been released in several Hasbro multi-packs such as the Heavy Assault Squad, Winter Operations, and the Desert Patrol Squad Toys "R" Us exclusive. A common element in almost all Snake Eyes figures, is that his face is covered (except for the 2005 "Classified" series action figure, depicting him before he was disfigured).

The 1991 version was also released as a 12" G.I. Joe Hall of Fame action figure in 1992. This Snake Eyes figure introduced a new variation on the trademark G.I. Joe scar by putting the scar over the figure's left eye, instead of on his right cheek as had traditionally been the case during the vintage era (1964–1978) of G.I. Joe.

A version of Snake Eyes with no accessories came with the Built to Rule Headquarters Attack in 2004. The figure featured additional articulation with a mid-thigh cut joint, and the forearms and the calves of the figure sported places where blocks could be attached.

=== International variants ===
The 1982 mold of Snake Eyes was used in several countries in various forms. In most countries, because he was different from all of the other G.I. Joe figures available at that time, he was treated as a member of Cobra. In Brazil, his head was recolored and used to create Cobra De Aço (Cobra of Steel), and the entire mold was used with a silver Cobra logo to create Cobra Invasor. The figure was also available without the Cobra logo as O Invasor. In Argentina, Snake Eyes was recolored in red and silver, and released as Cobra Mortal and as a different version of Cobra Invasor.

=== 25th Anniversary ===
Snake Eyes was featured in the G.I. Joe Team 5 pack for the 25th anniversary in 2007 as a Commando, using a new mold heavily based on his first design. His ninja design (V2) also was sold in the first line of individual figures packaged with Timber in 2007. In 2008, he received an updated version of his "Version 3" mold from 1989, which featured removable butterfly swords for the first time. For the finale of the 25th anniversary in April 2009, Hasbro launched a poll on their website, for fans to pick their favorite figures for the Hall of Heroes line. Two versions of Snake Eyes were selected for this series, which featured the figures packaged on a blister card, but also in a special collectors box.

=== The Rise of Cobra ===
In 2009, to coincide with the film G.I. Joe: The Rise of Cobra, Hasbro released four figures based on the Snake Eyes movie character. The Ninja Commando figure is a classic rendition of his "V2" uniform from the original series. The Paris Pursuit figure features a uniform similar to his "V2" uniform, but with an overcoat, and includes either a black or grey wolf. The "Arctic Assault" figure is dressed in a white winter parka, with a traditional black mask. The "City Strike" figure features the head of Snake Eyes from G.I. Joe: Resolute, on the body of a previous version. Snake Eyes was also released as part of the Target-exclusive "G.I. Joe Rescue Mission" 4-pack, with the "Paris Pursuit" head on a new body. A version of Snake Eyes was released in 2010 with the "Jet Storm Cycle".

Snake Eyes was released for the G.I. Joe: The Rise of Cobra line as a 12-inch "ninja figure", with a sound chip and speaker in the torso, and push button "sword fighting action". His arms and hands featured molded-on clothing and gear. He was also released in a Wal-Mart exclusive wave of 12 inch figures, packaged with the Arashikage Cycle.

=== The Pursuit of Cobra ===
Two versions of Snake Eyes were released in 2010 as part of "The Pursuit of Cobra" line, one with his wolf Timber, and one with a special "tornado kick" feature. Both "Arctic Threat" and "Desert Battle" versions of Snake Eyes were also released in 2011.

=== 30th Anniversary ===
In 2011, two versions of Snake Eyes were released as part of the 30th Anniversary line, including one based on the animated series G.I. Joe: Renegades. As with the first movie, Hasbro released four figures based on the Snake Eyes character from G.I. Joe: Retaliation in 2012: a single carded figure, one included with the "Ninja Speed Cycle", one (with very limited articulation) included with the "Ninja Commando 4x4", and one with the "G.I. Joe Ninja Showdown Set". Three more versions of Snake Eyes were released in 2013

=== G.I. Joe Classified Series ===
Q2 of 2020 sees the release of G.I. Joe Classified Series, a new line of highly articulated 6-inch scale action figures that includes prominent characters like Snake-Eyes. This line features premium deco, detailing, articulation, and classic design updated to bring the classic characters into the modern era, plus accessories inspired by each character's rich history.

== Comics ==
=== Marvel Comics ===
Snake Eyes first appears in G.I. Joe: A Real American Hero #1 (June 1982).

In the Marvel Comics' continuity, written and drawn by Larry Hama, Snake Eyes, Stalker, and Storm Shadow served together during the Vietnam War in a LRRP unit. On a particular mission, a heavy firefight with the North Vietnamese Vietnam People's Army (NVA) resulted in the apparent death of his teammates (among them Wade Collins, who actually survives and later joins Cobra, becoming Fred II of the Fred series Crimson Guardsmen). When a helicopter arrived to pick up the surviving team members, the pursuing NVA opened fire, severely injuring Snake Eyes. Despite a direct order from Stalker to leave him, Storm Shadow went back for Snake Eyes, and was able to get Snake Eyes safely aboard the helicopter.

Upon returning home from the war, Snake Eyes met with Colonel Hawk, who informed him that his family had been killed in a car accident (which involved the brother of the man who would eventually become Cobra Commander). Devastated, Snake Eyes accepts an offer to study the ninja arts with Storm Shadow's family, the Arashikage Clan. Over time, Snake Eyes and Storm Shadow became sword brothers, and unintentional rivals for the attention and favor of Storm Shadow's uncle, the Hard Master. During one of Snake Eyes' training sessions, the Hard Master expressed his desire for Snake Eyes to take over leadership of the Arashikage clan instead of Storm Shadow. Snake Eyes refused, but then Zartan—hired by Cobra Commander to avenge the death of his brother—mistakenly killed the Hard Master instead of Snake-Eyes, using an arrow he stole from Storm Shadow. With Storm Shadow believed responsible for the death of the Hard Master, the Arashikage ninja clan dissolved. Snake Eyes returned to America, where he took up residence in the High Sierra mountains, and was eventually recruited for the G.I. Joe Team by Hawk and Stalker.

During one of the team's first missions in the Middle East, Snake Eyes, Scarlett, Rock 'n Roll, and Grunt are sent to save George Strawhacker from Cobra. On the way, their helicopter collides with another in mid air, forcing the Joes to bail out. When Scarlett is trapped in the burning helicopter, Snake Eyes stays behind to save her, but a window explodes in his face, scarring him and damaging his vocal cords. Despite his injuries, Snake Eyes convinces Hawk to let him continue on with the mission. Strawhacker, who was once engaged to Snake Eyes' sister, never learns the identity of the "scarred, masked soldier" who saved his life.

Later, when Scarlett is captured by Storm Shadow, Snake Eyes travels to Trans-Carpathia to rescue Scarlett, and battles Storm Shadow for the first time since he had left the Arashikage clan. Snake Eyes eventually learns that Storm Shadow joined Cobra to find out who was truly behind the murder of the Hard Master. After discovering it was Zartan who killed his uncle, Storm Shadow leaves Cobra and becomes Snake Eyes' ally, ultimately becoming a member of the G.I. Joe Team.

Snake Eyes and Storm Shadow would team up for some of G.I. Joe's toughest missions, and the bond between them would be both strengthened and tested. In the story arc "Snake Eyes Trilogy", the Baroness seeks revenge upon Snake Eyes, under the mistaken belief that he had killed her brother in Southeast Asia. She captures Snake Eyes while he is recovering from plastic surgery to repair his face, and shoots Scarlett in the process. Storm Shadow, Stalker, and Wade Collins lead a rescue at the Cobra Consulate building where Snake Eyes was imprisoned. After a second rescue mission for George Strawhacker and a run-in with the Night Creepers, Snake Eyes is finally reunited with Scarlett. For the first time in many years, Snake Eyes speaks Scarlett's name, and she wakes from her coma, eventually returning to active duty.

As Marvel's G.I. Joe series is drawing to a close, Snake Eyes and Cobra Commander finally battle each other in issue #150. Snake Eyes eventually wins against an armored Cobra Commander, but the Commander would have the last laugh, as he captures Storm Shadow and successfully brainwashes him back to the allegiance of Cobra. Snake Eyes and Scarlett would continue to serve G.I. Joe until its disbandment.

=== Devil's Due Publishing ===
Devil's Due Publishing and Image Comics introduced new elements into Snake Eyes' past during their Snake Eyes Declassified miniseries, which show more of Cobra Commander's motivation to kill Snake Eyes while training to become a ninja. Snake Eyes had an encounter with Cobra Commander prior to the formation of Cobra, where Cobra Commander befriended Snake Eyes and tried to recruit him into murdering a judge. The judge had convicted Cobra Commander's older brother of arson and insurance fraud, resulting in the ruin of his brother's life, causing his spiral downward into alcoholism, and ultimately the car accident that claimed both his life and the lives of Snake Eyes' family. Snake Eyes agreed to accompany Cobra Commander, but at the last minute refused to go along with the plan. Cobra Commander then killed the judge, and swore revenge against Snake Eyes, resulting in him hiring Firefly (who in turn subcontracted Zartan) to kill Snake Eyes while he was training with the Arashikage Clan.

The first four issues of G.I. Joe: Frontline featured Larry Hama's story "The Mission That Never Was". After the official disbandment, the original G.I. Joe team had to transport a particle beam weapon from Florida to General Colton's location in New York City. Since Billy, Storm Shadow, and the Baroness were left under the influence of Cobra's Brain Wave Scanner at the end of the original series, Snake Eyes is on this mission to save Storm Shadow. At the end of this story, Storm Shadow returns to his ways as a ninja, and says he will deal with Snake Eyes when he is ready. Snake Eyes and Scarlett move back to his home in the High Sierras, where Timber has died but sired a litter of pups before passing, and Snake Eyes adopts one. After the G.I. Joe Team disbanded, Snake Eyes and Scarlett leave the military and become engaged, but for unknown reasons on the day of the wedding, Snake Eyes disappears and retreats again to his cabin in the High Sierras.

The following Master & Apprentice miniseries reveals that Snake Eyes, along with Nunchuk, and T'Jbang, were training a new apprentice, Ophelia, to be the last of the Arashikage ninja clan, shortly after he and Scarlett became engaged. As Ophelia's final test, she and Snake Eyes confront Firefly for his role in the murder of the Hard Master. However, Firefly kills Ophelia and escapes, leaving Snake Eyes devastated. As a result, on his wedding day, Snake Eyes breaks off his engagement to Scarlett in front of Stalker, then again disappears to his compound in the Sierras. There, he is approached by Sean Collins, the son of his Vietnam War buddy Wade Collins. Sean asks Snake Eyes to train him as a new apprentice, after watching his crew also get slaughtered by Firefly on the night Ophelia was killed. Some time later, Jinx and Budo call Snake Eyes to investigate new intel on the location of Firefly, who is working for the "Nowhere Man". Snake Eyes confronts Firefly, who is meeting with another masked ninja, revealed to be Storm Shadow. Sean is eventually given the name Kamakura, and would later join the G.I. Joe team.

In the pages of G.I. Joe: A Real American Hero, Snake Eyes and Scarlett would be reunited upon G.I. Joe's reinstatement, and the two again became engaged. Snake Eyes is involved in many skirmishes with Cobra, including altercations with Storm Shadow, the return of Serpentor (in which Snake Eyes was injured by a grenade blast but quickly recovered), Snake Eyes' triumph over the Red Ninja leader Sei Tin (which gave Snake Eyes control of the Red Ninja clan), and a close-call defeat at the hands of the heavily armored Wraith. The team is then reduced to a smaller unit, and when Snake Eyes, Scarlett, and Duke get into trouble, a shadowy cabal of generals known as "The Jugglers" has Snake Eyes and Duke arrested. However, Scarlett meets with Storm Shadow (who had broken free of his mind control), and they rescue Snake Eyes and Duke from a convoy. They escape to Iceland and hide out with Scanner, however they are tailed by former Coil agent Overlord, who fatally injures Scanner and locks the Joes in a bomb shelter. In his last moments, Scanner activates the Icelandic station's self-destruct mechanism, killing Overlord in the blast and saving the Joes. The team then assists Flint, Lady Jaye, and General Philip Rey in dealing with a new menace, the Red Shadows. When the Red Shadows attempted to assassinate Hawk at a mountain camp, Snake Eyes sends his apprentice Kamakura to get Hawk to safety. Snake Eyes would later help in defeating the Shadows before their plot could be set into motion, even fighting leader Wilder Vaughn, who escapes.

Snake Eyes and Kamakura also travel to Asia, to assist Storm Shadow in finding his apprentice, who had been kidnapped by the Red Ninjas. Snake Eyes helps Storm Shadow defeat Red Ninja leader Sei Tin, but the mission is a failure. Snake Eyes relinquishes control of the Red Ninjas to Storm Shadow, who in turn leaves his clan in T'Jbang's care.

==== America's Elite ====
Snake Eyes is reactivated as a member of the team in G.I. Joe: America's Elite, along with Stalker, Scarlett, Flint, Duke, Shipwreck, Roadblock, and Storm Shadow. With their new covert status and reduced roster, they continued to track down Cobra cells and eliminate them, from their new headquarters in Yellowstone National Park code named "The Rock". When Vance Wingfield seemingly returns from the grave, and drops deadly satellites onto major metropolitan areas using equipment supplied by Destro, Duke, Scarlett and Snake Eyes all leave to conduct solo investigations. Snake Eyes tracks Firefly to Chicago, and interrupts his attempt to assassinate a gang lord. Upon returning, Snake Eyes finds that Scarlett has been captured while investigating Cesspool. He reveals that both he and Scarlett had implanted tracking devices in one another, and that only they know the frequencies. He finds her on Destro's submarine in the Pacific Ocean, and succeeds in rescuing her, but Destro escapes, and Snake Eyes dies during the operation.

Snake Eyes' body is stolen by the Red Ninjas, in order to resurrect him. The Joes track the Red Ninjas to China, where Sei-Tin takes control of Snake Eyes, and uses him to exact his revenge against Storm Shadow and Kamakura. They eventually defeat Sei-Tin and return Snake Eyes to normal. Shortly after, Scarlett observes Snake Eyes seemingly abandoning all of his ninja training, and focusing solely on his military training instead. Following the session, Scarlett unmasks Snake Eyes and is shocked at the sight. Later, Snake Eyes reveals to Scarlett and Stalker that the Baroness is still alive, and being held captive within the Rock, which leads them to confront General Colton. When ordered on a mandatory break, Snake Eyes and Kamakura go on a retreat to the High Sierras, where Kamakura tries to rationalize that Snake Eyes could not have died, but must have put himself into a trance. He then argues that Snake Eyes should not have given up his ninja skills, and that he wishes to work with him to restore his faith. Snake Eyes returns to active duty, and investigates a medical facility with Stalker and Scarlett, where they find a fatally injured Scalpel. He informs them that the Baroness is free and looking for revenge on both G.I. Joe and Cobra.

In the one-shot comic Special Missions: Antarctica, Snake Eyes is part of the team that is called to investigate an Extensive Enterprises venture in Antarctica. The G.I. Joe team eventually split up to find Tomax and Xamot, and Snake Eyes goes with Snow Job to infiltrate their base, where they fight and chase Tomax off.

Snake Eyes is involved in various battles during the final arc "World War III". When the Joes start hunting down every member of Cobra that they can find, Snake Eyes and Scarlett apprehend Vypra, and capture Firefly in Japan. As part of Cobra Commander's sinister plot, he sends the elite squadron known as The Plague to attack G.I. Joe headquarters. As the evenly matched Plague and G.I. Joe teams clash, Cobra sleeper cells attack government buildings in nations across the globe.

Meanwhile, Storm Shadow tries to stop Cobra from liberating prisoners from the G.I. Joe prison facility, The Coffin. He is partially successful, but Tomax manages to free Firefly and several others, while killing those Cobra Commander considered "loose ends". Storm Shadow then joins Snake Eyes and the rest of the main team in defeating several Cobra cells, and disarming nuclear weapons that Cobra Commander has placed in the Amazon and Antarctica. Cobra Commander and The Plague retreat to a secret base in the Appalachian Mountains, where the final battle takes place, and Snake Eyes again defeats Firefly in a sword duel. In the end, Snake Eyes is shown among the members of the fully restored G.I. Joe team.

Hasbro later announced that all stories published by Devil's Due Publishing are no longer considered canonical, and are now considered an alternate continuity.

==== Alternate continuities ====
In the separate continuity of G.I. Joe: Reloaded, which featured a more modern and realistic take on the G.I. Joe/Cobra war, it is hinted that Snake Eyes is a former Cobra agent, who quit and decided to assist G.I. Joe instead. Although he did not serve on the team, it was shown that Snake Eyes was interested in Scarlett, but the series ended before anything further was explored.

Snake Eyes appears in G.I. Joe vs. The Transformers, the Devil's Due crossover series with Transformers set in an alternate continuity. As G.I. Joe is organized, Snake Eyes is assigned to a group of soldiers protecting a peace conference in Washington. He is called "Chatterbox" but does not actually speak, because he had been dared by the other soldiers to actually keep quiet for a time. Snake Eyes is terribly scarred, and loses his voice, when a Cobra Commander-controlled Starscream shoots Cover Girl's missile tank out from under him. His family is also killed during the attack. During the assault on Cobra Island, Snake Eyes slices open one of Starscream's optics and shoves a grenade into the socket. During the final part of the first miniseries, Snake Eyes is given a Cybertronian-based Mech that allows him to fight the much larger Decepticons, as well as Cobra agents in Decepticon suits. The second miniseries focuses on several Transformers being sent back in time to various time periods, which forces G.I. Joe and Cobra to team-up to retrieve them. The first group to be sent back in time includes Snake Eyes, Lady Jaye, Zartan, and Storm Shadow, sent back to 1970s California. After recovering all of the Transformers, they arrive back on Cybertron. During the third miniseries, it is shown that Snake Eyes has developed a love interest with Scarlett, who returns those feelings after he rescues her from a Decepticon prison, and removes his mask to show his scarred face. Later, they appear to be in a relationship. During the fourth miniseries, Snake Eyes is only shown in one scene as still being an active member of the Joe team, along with Flint, Lady Jaye, and Duke. He also appears briefly fighting several of the Cobra-La Royal Guards.

Transformers/G.I. Joe was originally planned for publication during the same time as G.I. Joe vs. The Transformers by Dreamwave Productions, until they announced bankruptcy, leaving only the first miniseries completed. The story features the Transformers meeting the G.I. Joe team in 1939, where Snake Eyes is prominent in defeating the Decepticons by opening the Matrix. In the second miniseries set in the 1980s, Snake Eyes is somehow still in fighting shape, despite having been a member of the team in 1939.

=== IDW Publishing ===
==== G.I. Joe: A Real American Hero continuation ====
In 2009, IDW Publishing took over the license for G.I. Joe comics, and started a new series that continues where the Marvel Comics series ended. The series began with a free Comic Book Day issue #155 1/2, and replaces all of the Devil's Due Publishing continuity that had previously been established. This continuation of the Marvel series is again written by Larry Hama.

Snake Eyes ultimately sacrifices himself to stop a revived Serpentor from destroying the Pit III, by tackling him into a shaft with a grenade in his hand. To convince Cobra that Snake Eyes is still alive, the recently recruited Sean Collins, who himself has been disfigured much as Snake Eyes was, is given the identity of Snake Eyes to continue in his name.

==== Hasbro Comic Universe ====
IDW Publishing also started a G.I. Joe comic series that does not connect to any of the past continuity. Snake Eyes is once again a member of the team, and throughout the first storyline, he is a renegade agent of G.I. Joe, with whom Scarlett is in communication unapproved by Hawk. Snake Eyes first appears in the Crimean Rivera chasing Nico. It is later mentioned by Duke that Snake Eyes has gone AWOL. Scarlett sends him a message signed "Love Red", which is a code telling him to run. He heads to Seattle where he finds Mainframe, and gives him the hard drive that Scarlett requested, containing information about Springfield. Once there, they retrieve evidence from a secret lab that Cobra exists, before the town is leveled by a MOAB. With the evidence in hand, the two are accepted back into the G.I. Joe team. Snake Eyes eventually heads to Manhattan, NYC, to meet his old mentor, who helps him heal his mind after his defeat.

In G.I. Joe: Origins, Snake Eyes receives an update to the origin of his wounds. In the first storyline, Duke and Scarlett travel to the North Las Vegas community hospital, and find Snake Eyes in the burn unit intensive care near bed K (BUICK), the only survivor of an explosion at a plastic surgery clinic. Snake Eyes' face and hands are completely bandaged, and he is now mute because of the explosion. Duke and Scarlett escape with Snake Eyes, before the hospital room is destroyed by the Billionaire/Chimera. Snake Eyes continues to appear with his face wrapped in bandages throughout the first storyline. He later appears in his black uniform with a visor and sword, a variation of his original figure's uniform, as part of the second storyline on a mission in London .

A solo title G.I. Joe: Snake Eyes started in May 2011, being part of the G.I. Joe: Cobra Civil War saga. After Cobra Civil War ended, G.I. Joe: Snake Eyes continued into the new story arc G.I. Joe: Cobra Command, finally showing why and how he deserted the Joes and what part Storm Shadow had played.

In January 2015, IDW published G.I. Joe: Snake Eyes – Agent of Cobra. Written by Mike Costa, this series looks into Snake Eyes joining Cobra, whether Storm Shadow and Scarlet will join him, and how Destro plays into his transition.

Snake Eyes is also the central character in IDW's 2020 comic series Snake Eyes: Deadgame, from writers Rob Liefeld and Chad Bowers.

=== DC Comics ===
Snake Eyes appears in the third issue of DC's crossover comic Batman/Fortnite: Zero Point. In the issue, Snake Eyes is sent into a time loop to fight Batman, both tying in every loop until they both respect each other and start working together. The issue ends with Snake Eyes walking into the storm so that Batman can escape the time loop.

== Animated series ==
=== Sunbow ===
Unlike his comic book counterpart, Snake Eyes did not play a major role in the Sunbow's G.I. Joe: A Real American Hero TV series, with the exception of the first three miniseries. He was always portrayed as a trusted and loyal teammate, and even proved to have a sense of humor, as seen when he broke into a break-dancing routine on-stage, and later in a disguise resembling Boy George in the "Pyramid of Darkness" miniseries. In the first miniseries, "The M.A.S.S. Device", Snake Eyes appeared in his "V1" uniform, but for all of his later appearances he wore a bluish-grey version of his "V2" uniform. Additionally, he does not have a rivalry with Storm Shadow in the cartoon, who instead fights with such characters as Spirit and Quick Kick. Although Snake Eyes does not speak, the vocal effects of his wolf Timber were provided by Frank Welker.

Some of his origins were explored in "The M.A.S.S. Device", in which he is among the several Joes who head to the Arctic in search of radioactive crystals, one of three catalytic elements needed to power a M.A.S.S. Device. While Snake Eyes obtains the crystals which are found in a cave, Cobra cuts off the Joes' escape and Major Bludd detonates an explosive charge placed in the mine, which releases a cloud of radioactive gas. However, Snake Eyes lowers a glass shield, sealing himself behind and activating an emergency exit, which the rest of the Joes escape through. Snake Eyes survives the radiation and collects some crystals in a canister. While stumbling through the wilderness, he frees a wolf caught in a trap. They are rescued from a polar bear by a blind hermit, who cures Snake Eyes of his radiation sickness and names the wolf Timber. Adopting the wolf as a pet, Snake Eyes returns to G.I. Joe headquarters, where he delivers the crystals.

In the second miniseries, "The Revenge of Cobra", Duke and Snake Eyes are captured by Cobra. They are forced to fight each other in a gladiatorial combat, but send a Morse code to Joe headquarters to warn them about Cobra's plan to attack Washington, D.C., with the Weather Dominator. They later work with Roadblock and his friend Honda Lou West in stopping Destro from controlling the Weather Dominator. In "The Pyramid of Darkness", the third miniseries and first-season premiere, Snake Eyes and Shipwreck infiltrate a Cobra underwater factory and steal a laser disc containing information on the cubes to the pyramid of darkness. They are later rescued through the efforts of a popular lounge singer named Satin. When Cobra Commander and the Crimson Twins make a final attempt to flee via rocket ship, Snake Eyes, Shipwreck and Satin manage to stop them, before escaping so that the Joes could destroy the rocket.

Snake Eyes is shown in a few scenes of G.I. Joe: The Movie, including the opening title sequence, but like many of the characters of the Sunbow cartoon, he has a very minor role in the final battle. He is part of a unit of Joes led by Roadblock who go after the fleeing Cobra forces after Cobra's first attempt to steal the Broadcast Energy Transmitter (B.E.T.) and become captives of Cobra-La.

=== DiC ===
Snake Eyes was shown during the DiC's G.I. Joe series in his 1991 "V4" uniform. He did have a few key episodes, and was shown to be working with his blood brother Storm Shadow, who now was a member of the G.I. Joe Ninja Force. Snake Eyes was shown more in this series as a ninja, but none of his origins or his relationships were explored before this series ended.

=== Resolute ===
Snake Eyes first appears in G.I. Joe: Resolute during a briefing on the attack of the USS Flagg. During an autopsy on Bazooka, a scroll with the Arashikage symbol on it is found. The instructions on the scroll tell Snake Eyes to go where everything began, where he takes out a team of Cobra Neo-Vipers while Storm Shadow watches and waits. After this battle, a brief history of Storm Shadow and Snake Eyes is shown. In this series, their rivalry comes from Storm Shadow wanting his uncle to teach him the Seventh Step to the Sun technique, a move that allows one to kill an opponent in seven blows. When his uncle refuses, Storm Shadow signals Zartan to assassinate his uncle. Snake Eyes is shot in the throat by Zartan, to prevent him from warning their master, resulting in his becoming mute. Snake Eyes and Storm Shadow face off in a one on one battle. Storm Shadow initially dominates the fight, as he had been taught the Sixth Step to the Sun compared to Snake Eyes' fifth. Snake Eyes however shows that he in fact was taught the Seventh Step to the Sun technique, and kills Storm Shadow with seven blows, the last perforating his skull. He later rejoins the rest of the team in their final assault on Cobra Commander's headquarters. The love triangle of Snake Eyes, Scarlett and Duke is also explored slightly in this series. Early on in the episode, Duke makes Scarlett choose between Snake Eyes and himself, and she ultimately decides to be with Duke.

=== Renegades ===
In G.I. Joe: Renegades, Snake Eyes is a member of G.I. Joe. He was given the name "Hebi no me" ("Snake Eyes") by his Arashikage clan sensei, Hard Master, because he possesses the "steely gaze of a serpent". He cannot speak after having his throat punctured, and just shows up for special missions when called by Scarlett, who can "translate" what he is thinking. He is not used to teamwork, but now that he has joined G.I. Joe, his sense of honor and morality would not let him walk away. In the episode "Dreadnoks Rising", Zartan takes off his visor but puts it back on and says, "You need it more than I do". Snake Eyes' wolf Timber made an appearance in the episode "White Out", where he was rescued by Snake Eyes from a bear trap, before they were assaulted by Storm Shadow and Shadow-Vipers; at the end, Snake Eyes asks Snow Job to watch Timber until he returns. In the episode "Revelations, Part 1", Scarlett learns that Snake Eyes briefly met her father, and promised him to look after his daughter, and he shows signs of having feelings for her. During the time when Snake Eyes still spoke, before his throat injury in the episodes "Return of the Arashikage, Parts 1–2", Snake Eyes was voiced by Danny Cooksey.

== Sigma 6 ==
=== Sigma 6 toys ===
Snake Eyes again appears as part of the G.I. Joe: Sigma 6 toy series. Although similar in concept to the earlier G.I. Joe: A Real American Hero toyline, the Sigma 6 action figures do not tie into the continuity of the original G.I. Joe universe, and were 8" in height rather than the smaller 3 3/4" scale figures of the A Real American Hero line.

The first wave in 2005 contained a Snake Eyes figure. A "Ninja Showdown" battle pack also contained alternate versions of Snake Eyes and Storm Shadow. In 2006, all of the 2005 figures were re-released with new molds and accessories, including four different versions of Snake Eyes. A new version of Snake Eyes was also released in 2007.

To complement the 8-inch (200 mm) line of G.I. Joe: Sigma 6 action figures and vehicles, Hasbro also introduced a "mission scale" line of 2 1/2 inch scale Mission Sets action figures. Each set of action figures is packaged as a "mission in a box", and includes a Mission Manual.

=== Sigma 6 animated series ===
In the Sigma 6 animated series, Snake Eyes' history has been substantially changed from the A Real American Hero series, but he still shares a connection with Storm Shadow, who refers to him as "brother". Although Storm Shadow is a brainwashed Cobra agent, he blames Snake Eyes for the ruin of the Arashikage ninja clan. In Sigma 6, both Jinx and Kamakura serve as Snake Eyes' apprentices and G.I. Joe reserve members. As is in the original series, Snake Eyes is mute, but the reason for this is not explored. While the A Real American Hero animated series never showed Snake Eyes' true face, the Sigma 6 continuity takes some visual cues from the A Real American Hero comics. In one episode, when Snake Eyes is fighting Storm Shadow, his visor breaks and it appears that he has blonde hair, blue eyes, and a scar near his eye as a result of a training accident. In the sixth episode of season 2, Snake Eyes faces off against a pack of wolves. After saving one, the unnamed wolf helps him throughout the episode and is later seen howling atop a hill near Sigma Six headquarters. This was confirmed as a Sigma 6 version of Timber, when an Arctic Sigma Six figure of Snake Eyes was released with Timber, with the figure's bio card describing the plot from this episode.

=== Sigma 6 comics ===
Snake Eyes appeared in the Sigma 6 comic book, released by Devil's Due Publishing with direct connection to animated series. Snake Eyes is spotlighted in issue #6, which centers on Storm Shadow, as Snake Eyes is sent in to retrieve a stolen electronic device from him. Storm Shadow refers to Snake Eyes as "brother", and breaks Snake Eyes' headgear, partially exposing his face, which again is shown to be of a blonde American with a scar.

== Films ==
=== Direct-to-video films ===
Snake Eyes is a member of G.I. Joe in all of the direct-to-video CG-animated movies. The continuity of these movies does not tie into the previous history, and more directly leads into the events of G.I. Joe: Sigma 6. Snake Eyes and Storm Shadow are once again on opposite sides fighting each other.

Snake Eyes is shown throughout G.I. Joe: Spy Troops, which marked his first appearance as a major animated character. He is a part of the team that goes to rescue Scarlett after she is taken hostage by Zartan, but their relationship is not fully explored. Snake Eyes also spares Storm Shadow's life, even though he asked to have Snake Eyes end it.

Snake Eyes is seen in G.I. Joe: Valor vs. Venom as the master to both of his apprentices Jinx and Kamakura. Snake Eyes gives Kamakura a sword named "Tatsuwashi", and battles Storm Shadow as well as several of the new Cobra Ninjas.

In the animated short G.I. Joe: Ninja Battles, a new apprentice code named Tiger Claw is joining the G.I. Joe team, and learns of Snake Eyes' and Storm Shadow's past in the Arashikage Clan. Most of the movie is narration over original artwork and some scenes from the previous two movies, as well as some new footage at the end. This movie is not in the same continuity as the comics, and events here do not seem to progress into Sigma Six.

=== Live action films ===
Snake Eyes
- G.I. Joe character
- Ray Park as Snake Eyes in G.I. Joe: The Rise of Cobra. Printed on his arm is the Bagua trigram symbols for water and fire: the hexagram symbol for completion. The symbol is also used for the Arashikage Ninja Clan, of which Snake Eyes is a member.
- First appearance: 2009-2021
- Portrayed by: Ray Park (Original); Leo Howard (Young); Henry Golding (Adult); Max Archibald (Young)

In-universe information
- Affiliation: G.I. Joe
- Specialty: Martial arts specialist
- File name: Classified
- Birth place: Classified
- SN: Classified
- Rank: Classified
- Series: G.I. Joe: The Rise of Cobra; G.I. Joe: Retaliation; Snake Eyes

==== G.I. Joe: The Rise of Cobra (2009) ====
Martial artist/stuntman Ray Park played the character with actor and martial artist Leo Howard playing the younger version in the film G.I. Joe: The Rise of Cobra. In an early draft by Stuart Beattie, Snake Eyes would have spoken as a gag, but Larry Hama convinced him to drop the joke.

In the movie, Snake Eyes' origin is rebooted, with him being an abandoned 10-year-old child who found his way to the home of the Arashikage Clan. He battles the young Thomas Arashikage (Storm Shadow), who attacks him for stealing food. However, the orphan's natural ability to fight impresses Thomas's uncle, the Hard Master, who gives Snake Eyes his name, while bringing him under his wing. While Snake Eyes would initially lose to Thomas, Snake Eyes eventually surpasses Thomas and gains the favor of the Hard Master, becoming recognized as Hard Master's top student. Angered at Hard Master choosing Snake Eyes over him, Thomas appears to kill the Hard Master off-screen, and is then seen running off in midst of the chaos. Since then, Snake Eyes has chosen to take a vow of silence. Learning that Thomas, now known as Storm Shadow, is a member of Cobra, Snake Eyes fights him, before stabbing him and allowing him to fall into icy water at Cobra's Arctic base, leaving him for dead. Snake Eyes returns to the Pit with the surviving members of G.I. Joe.

==== G.I. Joe: Retaliation (2013) ====
Park returns as Snake Eyes in the sequel, G.I. Joe: Retaliation. In the film, Snake Eyes is framed by Zartan for assassinating the President of Pakistan under orders of G.I. Joe. Storm Shadow disguises himself as Snake Eyes to break Cobra Commander out of prison, as the real Snake Eyes watches from the shadows. With the help of Jinx, Snake Eyes captures Storm Shadow and takes him to the Blind Master to pay for his assassination of the Hard Master. However, Snake Eyes learns that Zartan was the one who murdered the Hard Master and framed Storm Shadow for it, and that Storm Shadow only joined Cobra in order to avenge the Hard Master's death. With this revelation, Storm Shadow teams up with Snake Eyes and the Joes to stop Cobra Commander's plan to destroy several countries and take over the world. During the final battle, Snake Eyes allows Storm Shadow to deal with Zartan, by giving him the Blade of Justice. Snake Eyes and the Joes stop Cobra Commander's plan and are declared heroes, absolved of their accusations.

==== Snake Eyes (2021) ====
A spin-off of G.I. Joe featuring Snake Eyes which takes place in an alternate continuity was released in 2021. Henry Golding stars in the title role and Max Archibald as the younger version of the character.

In Washington state, a young boy and his father walk through the woods and head for a cabin, which, unknown to the boy, is a "safe house" for them to hide out from assassins led by Mr. Augustine. That night, they are under attack by Augustine and his men. To determine his fate, the father is forced to roll a pair of dice, and rolls double ones. The boy tries to defend him but fails. While escaping as he is told, he hears the sound of a gunshot that kills his father. He takes his name from the dice roll to conceal his true identity.

Twenty years later, the boy, now known as "Snake Eyes", has grown into a talented and deadly martial arts fighter. In an underground fighting circuit in Los Angeles, he is discovered by yakuza boss Kenta Takamura, who asks him to work for him. Snake Eyes accepts after Kenta offers to help him find his father's killer, and begins smuggling weapons inside gutted fish. One day, Kenta orders Snake Eyes to kill his cousin Tommy for betraying him as a proof of loyalty, but Snake Eyes instead helps Tommy escape. In the process, he loses consciousness due to lack of blood. Snake Eyes wakes up in Tommy's private jet en route to Tokyo. In return for saving his life, Tommy invites him to join the Arashikage Clan. Tommy's grandmother Sen, leader of the clan, and Akiko, the head of security, agrees to let Snake Eyes join the clan if he passes three trials. Unbeknownst to the Clan, Snake Eyes is working as a double agent for Kenta to steal for him the "Jewel of the Sun", an artifact of destructive powers which the Arashikage Clan has long been protecting and sworn not to use, so that Kenta can use it to seize power in the clan. When he learns he is tasked with stealing the jewel on behalf of the Cobra terrorist organization, Snake Eyes is reluctant, but Kenta hands him the dice used when his father was killed and promises to hand over Mr. Augustine if he succeeds. Snake Eyes then wins the trust of Akiko by revealing his father's murder and explains that is why there is no recorded history of him. He does not pass the third and final trial with sacred anacondas, but Akiko saves his life from the snakes. He admits that he has not been entirely honest, and is expelled.

Snake Eyes later returns to the dojo and steals the Jewel of the Sun, delivering it to Kenta and the Baroness. Upon learning that Augustine is a Cobra agent, Snake Eyes realizes the consequences of his bloodlust and spares him. He goes back to warn the Arashikage Clan of Kenta's attack, and assists them in fighting off Kenta's men. Kenta manages to escape, but Snake Eyes traps him in the anaconda pit, allowing the snakes to devour Kenta. The clan judges Snake Eyes to be pure of heart for abandoning his desire for revenge and welcomes him back. Tommy, who has broken his promise to never use the jewel, is determined no longer fit to lead, and leaves the clan, vowing to kill Snake Eyes should they ever meet again. Snake Eyes is approached by G.I. Joe member Scarlett, an ally of the clan, who offers him to become a Joe, after explaining that his father was a G.I. Joe agent as well. Snake Eyes begins a mission to find Tommy and bring him back to the Arashikage Clan. He dons a black outfit and helmet given to him by Akiko before leaving.

== Video games ==
- Snake Eyes is one of the featured characters in the 1985 computer game G.I. Joe: A Real American Hero.
- Snake Eyes appears, in his "V3" uniform, as a playable character in the 1991 G.I. Joe video game for the NES. His special abilities include jumping faster and higher than the other characters, and he can use his sword as a projectile weapon that does not use up any ammo. He can be selected for any of the missions from the start, and is actually the team leader for the game's third mission set in New York.
- Snake Eyes appears, in his "V4" uniform, as a playable character in the 1992 G.I. Joe: The Atlantis Factor video game for the NES. He can be selected for missions after he is found, which is not until late in the game after completing Area E.
- Snake Eyes is featured as a playable character in the 1992 arcade game G.I. Joe.
- Snake Eyes is featured as a playable character in the 2009 video game G.I. Joe: The Rise of Cobra.
- Snake Eyes is featured as a purchasable cosmetic outfit in the game Fortnite: Battle Royale.
- Snake Eyes is featured as a playable character in the 2020 video game G.I. Joe: Operation Blackout.
- Snake Eyes is featured as a crossover character in the video game Brawlhalla, alongside Storm Shadow.
- Snake Eyes is featured as a purchasable cosmetic outfit in the game Overwatch 2.

== Reception ==
Snake Eyes is one of the most popular and recognizable G.I. Joe characters. In 1986, G.I. Joe creator Larry Hama called him the most successful character he ever created, believing this is because his mysterious appearance and persona means "he becomes a universal blank slate for projection of fantasy for anybody."

In 2008, TechCrunch used the question "Could he/she beat Snake Eyes?" while evaluating the top video game ninja characters. In 2010, Topless Robot ranked Snake Eyes as the first on the list of The 10 Coolest G.I. Joe Ninjas, calling him "the most popular member of the team". UGO.com included him on the lists of TV's Worst Speakers (in 2010), and the Best Silent Killers of Movies and TV (in 2011). In 2013, IGN ranked Snake Eyes as the best G.I. Joe on the list of The Top 10 Joes and Cobras, also stating he is like the "Wolverine of G.I. Joe, except he knows when to shut up."
