= Donald Levine =

American business executive (1928–2014)

Donald M. Levine
- Born: April 1, 1928; Elmhurst, Chautauqua County, New York
- Died: May 22, 2014 (aged 86); Providence, Rhode Island
- Occupation: Executive of Hasbro
- Known for: Creator of GI Joe and its related toys
- Children: 3

Don Levine (April 1, 1928 – May 22, 2014) was a business executive at toy manufacturers Hasbro credited as the "father" of G.I. Joe action figures.

Donald Levine was born in Elmhurst, New York to the late Ralph and Mildred Levine. He graduated Syracuse University. He was an avid tennis player competing in the Jr. Davis Cup and representing the US Army in tournaments in Asia during his military career.

As Hasbro's head of research and development, Levine guided G.I. Joe through its design and development after receiving the conceptual idea from a man named Stanley Weston (Weston received $100,000 for his contribution) and the name from a 1945 film called The Life of G.I. Joe, also called The Story of G.I. Joe. Levine served with the United States Army in the Korean War and Hasbro's employees also included many military veterans, so it was decided the toy should be outfitted in the uniforms of the Army, Navy, Marines, and Air Force and their respective accessories. In September 1971 he was appointed president of Leisure Concepts.

In 2005-2006, Levine designed and manufactured an action figure of Osama bin Laden for a Central Intelligence Agency psychological warfare program called Devil Eyes. Levine developed a twelve-inch lifelike figure whose face was painted with a material that, when heated, would peel off to reveal a demon-like visage with green eyes and black markings. When asked in 2014 about Levine's involvement in the program, his family said in a statement, "Don Levine was a dedicated Patriot, and proud Korean War veteran. When called on, he was honored to assist our country."

In 2014 Levine died from cancer at a Providence, Rhode Island hospice. He was survived by Nan, his wife of nearly 60 years. He had three children and four grandchildren. In the years before his death, he sold some rare prototypes of G.I. Joe Figures, including one that sold for $200,000 in 2003 at auction.
