= List of Energon Universe characters =

List of characters

The Energon Universe (EU) is an ongoing American comic book franchise and shared fictional universe created and overseen by Robert Kirkman, and distributed by Skybound Entertainment, an imprint of Image Comics, in collaboration with toy and entertainment company Hasbro.

Featuring concepts and characters from Transformers and G.I. Joe, the EU is the successor of the Hasbro Comic Book Universe by IDW Publishing (2005–2018).

This is a list of characters featured in the franchise; characters named in bold are new.

== A ==
- **Adele Burkhart**
- Air Raid
- Alpha Trion (A-3)
- Akronus
- Arcee Magnus (Arcee)
- Artyom Darklon
- Astrotrain
- Aura (Gloria Baker)

== B ==
- Baroness (Anastasia Cisarovna)
- Beach Head (Wayne Sneeden)
- Beachcomber
- Blast Off
- Blaster
- Major Bludd (Sebastian Bludd)
- Bluestreak
- Blurr
- Bola
- Bonechrusher
- Bosch
- Brawl
- Brawn
- Bruticus
- Buddie Hawks
- Bulkhead
- Bumblebee
- Buzzer

== C ==
- Carly
- **Carpet**
- Chameleon (Astoria Carlton-Ritz)
- Cliffjumper
- Clutch (Lance Steinberg)
- Cobra Commander
- Cover Girl (Courtney Krieger)
- Crystal Ball

== D ==
- **Darak**
- **Davey**
- Devastator
- Destro (James McCullen)
- **Dezimir**
- Doc (Carl Greer)
- **Minister Dulin**
- **Grand General Dukan**
- Duke (Conrad Hauser)
- Dusty Hayes

== E ==
- **Elander**
- Elita-1/Elita Prime (Ariel)

== F ==
- General Flagg (Lawerence Flagg)
- Fireflight
- Flint (Dashiell Faireborn)
- Frenzy
- **Frosting**

== G ==
- **Goliant**
- **Genvo**
- Golobulus
- Grakula
- **Grakum**
- Lord Gyconi

== H ==
- **Handroid**
- Hard Master
- Colonel Hawk (Clayton Abernathy)
- Doctor Henri Arkeville
- Hound
- Hot Rod

== I ==
- Ice Queen (Vanessa Warfield)
- Ironhide

== J ==
- Lady Jaye (Allison Hart-Burnett)
- Jazz
- Jetfire
- **Jimmy Witwicky**
- Jinx
- **Jorvud**

== K ==
- **Kanela**
- Baron Karza
- Kranix
- **Kulgith the Devourer**

== L ==
- Laserbeak
- **Laszlo Vandermeer**

== M ==
- **Mechanokoar**
- Megabyte (Alex Sector)
- Megatron/Megatronus Rex
- Megatronus the Fallen
- Mercer (Felix Stratton)
- Miles Mayhem (Miles Manheim)
- Mirage

== N ==
- Nemesis Enforcer

== O ==
- Omega Supreme
- Onslaught
- Optimus/Optimus Prime (Orion Pax)
- Overkill

== P ==
- **Proximus (Polada)**
- Pythona

== Q ==
- Quintesson Baillif
- Quintesson Judges
  - Makmun
  - Naven
- Quintesson Prosecutor
- Quintesson Scientist
- Quintesson Scorpia

== R ==
- Ramjet
- Raptor
- Ratbat
- Ratchet
- Ravage
- Reflector
- Ripper
- **Risk (Guerrero La Caza)**
- Road Pig
- Roadblock (Marvin Hinton)
- Rock 'n Roll (Craig McConnel)
- Rom
- Rumble

== S ==
- Scarlett (Shana O'Hara)
- Scott Trakker
- Scrap-Iron
- Shockwave
- Shooter (Jodie Craig)
- **Shredhead**
- Sideswipe
- Silverbolt
- Skuxxoid Alpha
- Skuxxoid Beta
- Skydive
- Skywarp
- Slingshot
- Slizardo
- Snow Job (Harlan Moore)
- **Solila**
- Soundwave
- Spectrum (Matt Trakker)
- Sparkplug Witwicky
- Spike Witwicky
- Springer
- Stalker (Lonzo Wilkinson)
- Starscream (Ulchtar)
- Storm Shadow (Thomas Arashikage)
- Straxus
- Superion
- Swindle
- T-Bob

== T ==
- Tailbreaker
- Teletraan-1
- Thrust
- Thundercracker
- Tomax Paoli
- Torch (Tom Winken)
- Trannis

== U ==
- Ultra Magnus
- **Ultum**

== V ==
- **Vector Theta**
- Doctor Venom (Archibald Monev)
- **Mistress Vill**
- Vipria
- Vortex

== W ==
- **Agent Walker**
- Warpath
- Wheeljack
- Wrecker (Sly Rax)

== X ==
- Xamot Paoli

== Z ==
- **Premier Zalilak**
- Zandar
- Zarana
- Zartan
- Zerta Trion (Beta)
