= Firefly (G.I. Joe) =

Character in G.I. Joe

- G.I. Joe character
- First appearance: G.I. Joe: A Real American Hero issue #24 (June 1984)
- Voiced by: Gregg Berger (Sunbow/Marvel); Sean Schemmel (Sigma Six); Peter MacNicol (Renegades); Jordan Reynolds (G.I. Joe: Operation Blackout)

In-universe information
- Affiliation: Cobra
- Specialty: Saboteur
- Primary MOS: Sabotage, Demolitions, and Terror

Firefly is a fictional character from the G.I. Joe: A Real American Hero toyline, comic books, and animated series. He is a mercenary who works for the Cobra Organization as a saboteur. He is portrayed by Ray Stevenson in the 2013 film G.I. Joe: Retaliation.

== Profile ==
Firefly's given name is unknown. Even Cobra Commander does not know his real name or what he looks like. Firefly is a ninja master, a saboteur, and an expert in all NATO and Warsaw Pact explosives and detonators. He always places his charges in the proper location for maximum damage. His fees are paid into a numbered Swiss bank account and are always paid in advance. He makes no guarantees, and gives no refunds.

=== H.I.S.S. ===
Firefly also tends to go together with Black Out and Munitia as H.I.S.S. (short for Hierarchy of Infiltration, Stealth, and Sabotage).

=== Phoenix Guard ===
The members of the Phoenix Guard were Cobra agents in disguise, but for Cobra Commander's elaborate ruse to succeed, each member of the team needed doctored military records and manufactured personal histories. Firefly's fabricated identity was Snake-Eater, real name Jason B. Lee, most likely an alias, as his birthplace and serial number were classified. Snake-Eater's specialties were ranger, counter-intelligence and cartography. He attended basic training, advanced infantry training, Airborne School and Ranger School all at Fort Benning, and also completed the Special Forces Qualification course at Fort Bragg. General Rey noted him to be brutal, impulsive, and unpleasant to be around, but could not deny his great skill in the field.

== Toys ==
Firefly was first released as an action figure in 1984. The 2up Prototype v1 Firefly was sculpted by King Design Associates, a well-known toy design, development and engineering firm in Providence, RI, owned by former 1970s-era Hasbro Engineer James King. Who was also the inventor of 12" Eagle Eye G.I. Joe. King Design Associates worked on multiple toys for Hasbro in the 1980s including the Firefly. It is rumored that the v1 Firefly has an alternate head for the 2up prototype. The v1 Firefly is the most reproduced G.I. Joe in the RAH line. The v1 Firefly body/head has been reproduced twelve (12) times, as the v1(1994), v4 (1998), v5 (2000), v7 (2002), BJ’s Special 8-pack v7 (2002), under a separate character name Wreckage (2003), v8 (2003), v9 (2003), v11 (2004), the v1 body was re-issued for v12 (2005), v13 (2005) and as the unreleased Saber Tooth (1988). A different version of Firefly was released in 1992. The figure was repainted and released as part of the Battle Corps line in 1993. Firefly has 13 action figures plus two convention exclusive figures in the 3¾" line, one 12" figure, and two 8" figures. He is most commonly seen in a ski mask and BDU fatigues. He is popularly shown in urban or grey camouflage, although only 4 of his figures portray him in that manner.

A version of Firefly with no accessories came with the Built to Rule Cobra Sand Snake in 2004, which followed the G.I. Joe: Spy Troops story line. The figure featured additional articulation with a mid-thigh cut joint, plus the forearms and calves of the figure sported places where blocks could be attached. The same figure was also recolored and released with the Built to Rule Cobra Venom Striker.

Firefly appeared as a Kreon in the 2013 G.I. Joe Kre-O toy line as part of the Check Point Alpha playset. The set includes Check Point Alpha along with Law & Order and a Cobra motorcycle piloted by Firefly.

=== 25th Anniversary ===
Firefly has been released in Wave 3.

== Comics ==
=== Marvel Comics ===
Firefly first appeared in the Marvel Comics series G.I. Joe: A Real American Hero #24 (June 1984).

Firefly's father was owed a debt by the Koga Ninja Clan. When his father died, Firefly was taken in by the ninja. Training with them he eventually earned Master status, and took the name "Faceless Master". Soon after Cobra Commander approached Firefly with a job: kill the man known as Snake-Eyes. Cobra Commander blamed Snake Eyes for his brother's death. Traveling to the Arashikage dojo where Snake Eyes was training, Firefly realized that he was no match for Snake Eyes.

Firefly approached the assassin Zartan for help. In a case of mistaken identity, Zartan kills the Hard Master, leader of the Arashikage, instead. The Hard Master's nephew, Storm Shadow, was blamed and he fled the dojo, dishonored and branded a traitor.

On another mission for Cobra Commander, Firefly was left in the Florida Everglades by the Commander. Running into Destro, who had also been left behind, the two returned to Cobra's base in Springfield, stopping for multiple battles with the Joes. They then plan revenge. First they attempted to return to the Commander's good graces by attacking Snake Eyes' mountain lodge. The Cobra agents were surprised that Snake Eyes was not alone and fled. When Firefly arrived in Springfield, he took part in the trial of Billy, Cobra Commander's estranged son, who had tried to kill the Commander. Storm Shadow freed Billy before a verdict could be reached.

Firefly in his second costume from G.I. Joe: A Real American Hero.

The Soft Master arrived in Springfield, tracking down his brother's killer. Firefly and Scrap-Iron chased down the Soft Master launching two missiles at him. They killed not only the Soft Master but also Candy, G.I. Joe agent Ripcord's girlfriend. Billy lost an eye and a leg. Ripcord was captured soon afterwards, but not before he transmitted the location of Springfield back to G.I. Joe HQ. Firefly was one of the last Cobra agents to leave Springfield. Firefly took more jobs from Cobra, fighting the October Guard in Afghanistan and fighting the G.I. Joe Team in the Baltic Sea and atop a glacier. He also tried to steal the Vector Jet from the Joes, but was stopped by Maverick. He also fought to secure a man made island near Cobra Island, but the unstable island soon sank just before the G.I. Joe Team could force the Cobra forces off the island. Dr. Mindbender took the blame for the failure in exchange for Firefly saving him. Firefly then attempted to steal top secret computer disks from the U.S. Government. He was stopped by the original G.I. Joe, General Joseph Colton.

Soon after Cobra Commander returned, and locked most of his enemies, including Firefly, in a freighter and buried it underneath a volcano. Firefly was later revealed to have escaped, using Battle Android Troopers to dig out of the freighter, and putting his uniform on the dead body of Serpentor. Firefly then brain-washed the Red Ninja, former Arashikage ninja, into following him. Snake Eyes broke the ninja free of the mind control, and they chased down Firefly, looking for vengeance. Firefly was again thought to be dead, and was not heard from for years.

Later, it is learned Firefly had been operating out of Cobra Island for some time. He has kept Road Pig and Zarana prisoners there, until the Cobra ninjas Slice and Dice found and free them.

=== Devil's Due ===
Firefly appears several times in the Devil's Due series. He steals a heavily modified Battle Android Trooper from a squad of Joes and Dreadnoks. To do this, he risks killing himself and hundreds of innocent people.

After Cobra was defeated, Firefly reappears, working for the "Nowhere Man" and recruiting soldiers for a new army. Snake Eyes, his student Ophelia, and the elite Hammer Team try to stop him. Ophelia and all but one of the Hammer members are killed. The survivor, Sean Collins, becomes Snake Eyes' new apprentice.

Later, in Tokyo, the two ninja face Firefly. He reveals that Derenko, a Hammer Team member long thought dead, is the Nowhere Man.

Serpentor, revived after his death in the Marvel series, launches a global attack from Cobra Island. It is revealed that Firefly and Derenko were recruiting for the Coil, Serpentor's new army. The combined might of a newly reformed Cobra and a newly reinstated G.I. Joe Team crushes the Coil, though not without fatalities for both organizations. Serpentor also dies. After a fight with Zartan, Firefly escapes one more time.

==== America's Elite ====
In America's Elite, a satellite crashes into Chicago, killing thousands. Snake Eyes finds Firefly there, but he escapes capture.

Later on the Phoenix Guard is created by Secretary of State Garrett Freedlowe, as an alternative force to replace G.I. Joe. It turns out that Freedlowe is really Cobra Commander in disguise, and that the Phoenix Guard, with the exception of their commanding officer General Rey, are all Cobra operatives. Firefly is involved as the member called "Snake-Eater". The Phoenix Guard attacks The Rock, G.I. Joe's secret base of operations. While the rest of the Phoenix Guard is captured following the G.I. Joe counterattack, Firefly manages to escape yet again. Firefly is later captured by Scarlett and Snake Eyes in Japan, and incarcerated in "The Coffin", a maximum security prison in Greenland. He later escapes imprisonment during Tomax's raid on the facility. Firefly fights Snake Eyes one on one during a battle in the Appalachian Mountains, and holds Snake Eyes at bay, until Storm Shadow throws a sword in Snake Eyes' direction. Snake Eyes grabs the sword and swiftly cuts Firefly across the chest, leaving him lying on the ground shaking.

==== Reloaded ====
G.I. Joe Reloaded, is a reboot of the G.I. Joe continuity. Firefly is an avid listener of classical music, debating whether he should listen to Chopin or Beethoven while destroying a Saudi Arabian train. Firefly destroyed the Golden Gate Bridge, tried to assassinate Hawk, was part of a plot to steal the U.S. Constitution, and attempted to destroy Saudi oil facilities. During the last mission he was captured by Rock 'n Roll, whose girlfriend had been killed during the Golden Gate attack.

=== IDW Publishing ===
In 2010, Firefly reappears in the IDW reboot of the series. He now shows his face, and is black.

== Animated series ==
=== Sunbow ===
Firefly appeared in the Sunbow G.I. Joe animated series, voiced by Gregg Berger. Firefly was first seen in the "Revenge of Cobra" miniseries, and later appeared throughout the first season, where he maintained his role as a saboteur and mercenary. In at least one episode, he is shown to be almost paranoid about concealing his identity, going so far as to threaten captives' lives if they turn to look at him despite the fact that he is wearing a mask; and becoming mildly enraged when Cobra Commander refers to him by his codename (acting as though he had just been addressed by his real name). He has important underworld contacts, which Cobra Commander is forced to turn to after he goes broke. Firefly is absent for most of the second season but appeared in the episode "Into Your Tent I Will Silently Creep", in which he is involved in one of Cobra Commander's plots to kill Serpentor.

==== G.I. Joe: The Movie ====
He also appears in the G.I. Joe: The Movie, but only for a short time. After the cartoon switched production companies from Sunbow/Marvel to DIC Entertainment, Firefly made no further appearances.

=== Direct to DVD films ===
Firefly is featured in a toy line based on G.I. Joe: Valor vs. Venom as a civilian turned into one of Cobra's Venomised troops.

=== Sigma 6 ===
Firefly has a major role in the Sigma 6 cartoon, joining the G.I. Joe Team at the beginning of the second season. He is shown to use fire-based weapons in battle. Throughout the first half of the season, it is hinted that there is a spy amongst the Joes. This is eventually revealed to be Firefly, who traps the team and turns them over to Cobra. Firefly's former commander Lt. Stone attempts to convince him it is not too late to side with the Joes, but Firefly is insulted by the offer. He shaves his head as a sign of his loyalty to Cobra, and after a climactic battle with Lt. Stone, leaves with Cobra Commander.

In "Ice", Firefly reappears wearing a costume reminiscent to both his Sigma 6 suit and his appearance in "A Real American Hero." In the episode, he fights Snake Eyes at a Terrordrome base in Antarctica. After Snake Eyes was accidentally frozen, Firefly captures Snake Eyes and makes off with Snake Eyes before the Antarctic Terrordrome base explodes.

In "Assault", Firefly fights Stone again and is defeated. Firefly escapes the collapsing base and tells Stone that he should leave.

He was voiced by Sean Schemmel in the English version.

=== Resolute ===
Firefly had a brief appearance in G.I. Joe: Resolute where he uses a portable rocket launcher to fire a projectile into the United Nations building. However, the device was only a holographic transmitter that allowed Cobra Commander to relay his demands to world leaders.

=== Renegades ===
Firefly first appears in the G.I. Joe: Renegades episode "Fire Fight" voiced by Peter MacNicol. Reimagined as a pyromaniacal arsonist who talks to fire like a lover, Firefly covers his face in Renegades not to obscure his identity, but to hide disfiguring burns across his body. Baroness and Doctor Mindbender send Firefly to terrorize the town of Green Ridge, after it wins a court order to prevent Cobra's dam construction. Firefly tries to burn down the mayor's home, but is thwarted by Duke, Roadblock, Barbecue, and Tunnel Rat. Firefly is then ordered to destroy the entire town. Firefly blows up the only bridge into Green Ridge, causing the Joes to flee via the dam. Duke and Snake Eyes confront Firefly near his helicopter, but he vanishes. As Roadblock then uses the helicopter to blow up the dam, Firefly reappears, causing the helicopter to crash into a cliff. It is unknown if Firefly survived or not.

== Live action film ==
Firefly
- G.I. Joe character
- First appearance: 2012
- Portrayed by: Ray Stevenson

In-universe information
- Affiliation: Cobra
- Primary MOS: Sabotage, Demolitions, and Terrorism
- Series: G.I. Joe: Retaliation

Ray Stevenson portrays Firefly in G.I. Joe: Retaliation, the sequel to G.I. Joe: The Rise of Cobra. Stevenson revealed in an interview to Total Films that Firefly is an ex-Joe. His codename in this version stems from his trademark weapon system, insectoid robot drones which he uses to surreptitiously deliver explosive charges. During production of the film, the character was not supposed to wear his trademark camouflaged mask, but Stevenson, who researched the character and became a fan of the original Firefly, lobbied to be shown wearing it in some scenes.

In the film, Firefly helps Storm Shadow break Cobra Commander out of prison. He later fights Roadblock, and mocks him as he prepares to kill him. He is then hit by a car driven by Flint, and escapes. While trying to activate a destructive satellite for Cobra Commander, Firefly is attacked by Roadblock, who defeats him in a gun and hand-to-hand combat battle. He attempts to send his firefly drones at Roadblock, who then causes Firefly's drones to explode on Firefly, killing him.

== Video games ==
Firefly is one of the featured villains in the 1985 G.I. Joe: A Real American Hero computer game.

Firefly appeared as a boss in 1992's G.I. Joe: The Atlantis Factor for the Nintendo Entertainment System.

In the video game G.I. Joe: The Rise of Cobra, Firefly, voiced by Matthew Moy, is the second boss who is fought towards the end of the "Desert Jewel" act.
