= G.I. Joe: Sigma 6 =

Line of toy action figures; animated series

- G.I. Joe: Sigma 6 logo, used for both the toy line and animated series
- Type: Action figures
- Company: Hasbro
- Country: United States
- Availability: 2005–2007
- Official website

G.I. Joe: Sigma 6 is a line of military-themed action figures and toys produced by Hasbro, re-imagining the characters of the 1980s toyline, G.I. Joe: A Real American Hero.

The Sigma 6 toy line served several purposes for Hasbro. First, it allowed them to depart from the classic 3 ¾-inch format of the A Real American Hero series of the 1980s; most Sigma 6 action figures stand at approximately 8 inches (200 mm) and have more articulation. Second, the new series offered them the chance to streamline the story and characters, stripping away old continuity and rebooting the franchise with younger versions of the cast, rendered in the anime style.

The line proved to be polarizing with G.I. Joe fans and ultimately unsuccessful at retail. Sigma 6 was cancelled after two years leaving many showcased sets and characters unproduced. In 2007 Hasbro went back to the classic 3¾"- 4" scale for the 25th anniversary line and beyond.

== Premise ==
In the 21st century, G.I. Joe is still fighting to prevent Cobra from taking over the world. An ambush in the Arctic (and the subsequent escape of Cobra Commander from prison) leads the Joes to believe something bigger is going on. After a major attack by Cobra on the G.I. Joe Team's headquarters, the Joes are forced to retaliate. This time, they are equipped with Sigma suits. Designed by Hi-Tech, these special body suits protect the Joes from Cobra's laser blasts and, in addition, enhance their abilities. The Joes are now code named Sigma 6.

== History ==
In 2005, G.I. Joe returned to television with "Sigma 6", the code name for a new group of G.I. Joe heroes with highly specialized capabilities, which they use to protect the world from the Cobra Commander and his evil forces. Sigma 6 featured many of the most popular and well-known G.I. Joe characters, such as Duke, Snake Eyes, Heavy Duty, Scarlett and Tunnel Rat, as well as a new hero, Long Range. The action figures made the jump to a larger scale (approximately 8 inch), replacing both 3 ¾ inch action figures and 12-inch (300 mm) action figures in retail stores.

== Toys ==
=== Commando scale ===
In 2005, Hasbro released a line of related toys. Although similar in concept to the earlier G.I. Joe: A Real American Hero toyline, the Sigma 6 action figures were 8" in height rather than the smaller 3¾" scale figures of the A Real American Hero line.

The first wave consisted of Duke, Heavy Duty, Kamakura, Snake Eyes, Spirit Iron-Knife, and Tunnel Rat. A "Sea Ops" version of Duke was also released in 2005. Cobra figures included a Ninja B.A.T. and a Storm Shadow figure. A "Ninja Showdown" battle pack contained alternate versions of Snake Eyes and Storm Shadow.

In 2006, new figures for G.I. Joe were Firefly, Hi-Tech, Long Range and Lt. Stone. Cobra figures included versions of Cobra Commander, Destro, a Sky B.A.T., and Zartan. All of the 2005 figures were re-released with new molds and accessories, including four different versions of Snake Eyes, and two different versions of Storm Shadow. In addition, a "Battlefield General" version of Cobra Commander, and a "Desert Gear" version of Long Range were released in 2006.

2007 saw the largest release of Sigma 6 figures, before the line was discontinued. For G.I. Joe, new figures of Flint, Grand Slam, Gung-Ho, Leatherneck, Recondo, Shipwreck, Shockwave, Lt. Torpedo, and Wet Suit were produced. New characters for the G.I. Joe Team included "Desert Wolf" (Ranger), "Inferno" (Firefighting Specialist), "Lockdown" (S.W.A.T.), and "Sgt. Boulder" (Mountain Scout).

In addition, new versions of Duke, Hi-Tech, Kamakura, Long Range and Snake Eyes were released in 2007, along with a Toys "R" Us exclusive "Land Sea Air" box set, which included Sigma 6 versions of Backblast, Barrel Roll and Deep Six. Cobra figures in 2007, included new versions of Cobra Commander, Destro, Storm Shadow and Zartan, as well as figures of Firefly, Iron Grenadiers, Cobra Red Ninja, Dark Ninja Master, and Red Banshee.

==== File card ====
The new figures also saw a significant change of the file cards. The names, the security number, and the birthplace information have been removed. The new format consisted of:

- a picture of the character
- code name
- function
- status
- personal history, and
- equipment portfolio, which is a description of the weapons the character carries.

=== Mission scale ===
To complement the 8-inch (200 mm) line of G.I. Joe: Sigma 6 action figures and vehicles, Hasbro introduced a line of 2 ½ inch scale Mission Sets action figures. Each set of action figures is packaged as a "mission in a box", and includes a Mission Manual.

==== R.O.C.C. ====
The Rolling Operations Command Center first appeared as an online exclusive from Hasbro in 2005, and came packaged with the Long Range action figure. Although it is technically part of the G.I. Joe: Sigma 6 animated series, the toy's packaging is heavily reminiscent of the A Real American Hero toyline.

Unlike previous command center-type vehicles (the Mobile Command Center and the General, being the other two), the R.O.C.C. is smaller but is far more mobile and maneuverable and, while not as heavily armed, packs more features. The ROCC resembles more of an extra-large freighter truck with trailer in tow. According to the ROCC's profile, it features cutting edge holographic technology, which can disguise the ROCC as a trailer truck or even a large camper, thus allowing for surprise attacks. The ROCC has a hidden launcher for eight missiles on the cab. The cab section can separate from the trailer for reconnaissance or assault purposes. The cab can fit six Joe figures in seated positions, with a seventh standing on a platform near the missile launcher. The trailer features a radar antenna and a gunner's station that can be moved to the front or back. The trailer opens to form a command center. The top lifts to reveal an elevator and mini-jet as well as an "escape tube". In the center is a command station with four chairs (only one can rotate) and computer consoles. The repair bay features two ramps and a movable claw.

Featured heavily in the G.I. Joe: Sigma 6 cartoon, the ROCC served as the Joe team's base during most of the show's first season. The size of the animated ROCC seemed to fluctuate throughout the season. It was able to drive down a one lane road and fit through openings fit for a truck. However, the animated ROCC was capable of housing the entire Sigma Six team, gear and vehicles such as Snake Eyes' Ninja Bike and the R.H.I.N.O. (Rapid Heli-Integrated Neutralizing Offense), which itself is a large vehicle.

==== Dragonhawk ====
The Dragonhawk is a fictional attack copter vehicle used by the G.I. Joe forces in the series G.I. Joe: Sigma 6. This vehicle arrived just in time to provide Scarlett, Duke and Snake Eyes when they were having some difficulty with Cobra troops (Zartan and the Dreadnoks). It was revealed to belong to British Joe operative Lt. Stone, a friend of Duke's. Along with the copter, he provided the team with the Sea Titan ship to be a self-sustained base for operations.

The Dragonhawk has twin turbines which provide VTOL (Vertical Take Off and Landing), forward thrust, and in a quick pinch, reverse thrust. In addition to combat support, it also functions as a drop ship, which provides transportation for some of the smaller vehicles in the Sigma 6 fictional world, like the V.A.M.P., the Night Ranger Quad, the Ninja Hovercycle, the Barracuda Jet Boat, and the Dune Runner. It also has a troop transport for the team.

The Dragonhawk's offensive capabilities include three missile launchers above each landing skid, twin 60 mm cannons, and a Gatling gun located just below and in front of the cockpit. Defensive capabilities include rotating each turbine to face opposite directions to activate an energy shield that repels both lasers and missiles..

== Animated series ==
G.I. Joe: Sigma 6
- The logo used for the animated series
- Genre: Action, military, science fiction
- Based on: G.I. Joe by Hasbro
- Written by: Masaki Wachi; John Touhey
- Directed by: Kobun Shizuno
- Music by: Russell Velázquez; John Siegler
- Countries of origin: United States; Japan
- Original language: English
- No. of seasons: 2
- No. of episodes: 26

Production
- Executive producers: Steve Drucker; Brian Goldner; Alfred R. Kahn; Norman J. Grossfeld
- Producer: Michele M. Duhn
- Production companies: 4Kids Productions; Gonzo

Original release
- Network: 4Kids TV (Fox)
- Release: September 10, 2005 – October 28, 2006

"Striking from the shadows, a ruthless organization named Cobra has returned to unleash an endless army of robotic troops and massive machines on the world. ... Our only hope: a group of highly skilled young operatives thrown together to save the planet. With time running out, they must become the super secret team known only as Sigma 6."

— opening narration from the theme song 2006 version

The toyline was accompanied by an animated series by the same name. The show's 26 episodes were produced by the American company 4Kids Productions and animated by the Japanese studio Gonzo, after which aired on Fox's 4Kids TV block and YTV, and an associated 6-issue comic series published by Devil's Due Productions.

The series is also available for streaming online on Amazon Prime Video, Plex, The Roku Channel, Tubi and YouTube (via the G.I. Joe channel).

=== Reception ===
The series was poorly received and did not finish airing its twenty-six episodes in the United States (although it did complete its run on YTV in Canada as late as June 2007). The next re-invention of the G.I. Joe property returned to the 3 ¾-inch size, concentrating solely on a 25th anniversary revisitation of the Real American Hero line that was targeted almost entirely at adult collectors.

=== Overview ===
Essentially, G.I. Joe: Sigma 6 is a continuation of the two direct-to-video G.I. Joe CGI movies, G.I. Joe: Spy Troops and G.I. Joe: Valor vs. Venom, both films produced by Reel FX Studios. Several references are made to events from Valor vs. Venom, such as Cobra Commander being captured and in prison, Overkill recovering from his injuries, and General Hawk suffering a change in his DNA. Snake Eyes continues to have Kamakura and Jinx as his apprentices. Despite these connections, there are changes that bring to question how much of a continuation Sigma 6 is from A Real American Hero.

Just as he was in the first season of the Sunbow G.I. Joe series, Duke is clearly designated as the G.I. Joe commander. He is also recast as a much younger man, someone who appears to have just come to his 30s rather than a man going to his 40s. Scarlett, who has always been a major character, had her position in the team upgraded to second-in-command after Duke. Like Duke, she has been aged younger for the series though their youth may be attributed to the fact that the artwork is done in an anime style. She is however still the team's counterintelligence specialist. Tunnel Rat's appearance and personality varied greatly from his appearance in A Real American Hero series. Here, he is a bug-eating, unorthodox infiltration and demolitions expert. Heavy Duty seems to have retained his personality from Spy Troops and Valor vs. Venom, serving as the team's weapons expert. Added to the team is a tracker, Spirit Iron-Knife, and his falcon Billy, who retains his strong and shamanist personality, as well as the team sniper and transportation specialist Long Range. Hi-Tech serves as the team's technician and mechanic. Jinx, Kamakura and Snake Eyes function as the team's ninja unit. Snake Eyes has remained the silent deadly ninja commando with Jinx and Kamakura as his students. Hawk was last seen in a healthy state at the end of Valor vs. Venom but his appearance in Sigma 6 indicates otherwise. He is seen in a hospital where Duke visited him.

At the start of Season 2, Lt. Stone (an apparent old friend of Duke's) arrives and joins the team under orders of Hawk and provides them with a new seafaring base, the Sea Titan, as well as his personal attack copter, the Dragonhawk, which will also be used as a drop ship for the team's vehicles that can be carried by the Dragonhawk, like the Ninja Hovercycle, the Night Ranger Quad and the V.A.M.P. Along with Stone is the soldier Firefly (who betrays the team and captures all but Duke and Hi-Tech in season 2 episode 7 "Revelations").

The changes are not limited to the Joe Team. Cobra Commander had his appearance greatly overhauled and, likewise, his personality. No longer comical, he is now a more deadly adversary, closer to his standard portrayal in the comics, however he has retained his cartoon counterpart's love of grandiose schemes. Destro is now more clearly aligned with Cobra and together with the Commander and the Baroness, they truly form the Cobra Triumvirate. Meanwhile, Overkill is upgraded from a lowly lab assistant to a scheming cybernetic chief scientist who is stuck inside a giant glass tube. Zartan remains Cobra's master of disguise, however his shape shifting and stealth abilities are due to his suit rather than skill and genetic enhancements as in A Real American Hero. The Dreadnoks are now Torch, Buzzer and a new character called Machete (who is loosely based on Ripper). Storm Shadow serves as Cobra's ninja, however seems more inclined to work with Cobra B.A.T.s, leading the Ninja B.A.T.s into battle. This differs from his original portrayal in A Real American Hero as he has always had more faith in a well trained human as opposed to machines. Though the series is supposed to continue from Valor vs. Venom, in episode 2 "Escape", Cobra Commander says to Overkill that all his troops should be welcoming him, implying that Overkill was the only absent Cobra member. That claim ignores the presence of characters such as Doctor Mindbender or Slice in Valor vs. Venom.

=== Episode formula ===
Sigma 6 also has a recurring man vs. machine theme. Cobra's forces are often seen to be primarily composed of the Battle Android Troopers or B.A.T.s, while the members of the Cobra Triumvirate all possess some form of cybernetic enhancement or enhanced armored suits, with normal troopers wearing full armored uniforms. On the other hand, G.I. Joe also uses technology such as mobile battle suits utilized by the ninjas.

=== Episodes ===
==== Season 1 ====
1. Cobra Strike – Cobra hits the G.I. Joe team on two fronts: the North Pole and in the Amazon. The Joes fight off hordes of new-style B.A.T.s and deploy some new hardware of their own.
2. Escape – After hacking into the Sigma 6 computer and infecting it with a virus, Destro sends Zartan and the Dreadnoks on a rescue mission to free their leader Cobra Commander. Meanwhile, Duke visits General Hawk in the hospital, and Hawk's son Scott Abernathy draws some unwanted attention from Overkill after hacking into Cobra's computer in an attempt to perfect an A.I. system he's been working on.
3. Capture – With Cobra Commander back in charge of Cobra Command, he launches a full-scale assault on G.I. Joe Headquarters. Meanwhile, Scott Abernathy and Spud are pursued by Overkill's B.A.T. creation Overlord Vector.
4. Reveal – While fighting Storm Shadow, Snake Eyes tries to save Scott Abernathy and Spud. Following the destruction of G.I. Joe Headquarters, the other Joes try to stop Cobra's new plan called Cobra Coast.
5. Sigma – Duke, Scott Abernathy, and the other Joes race the clock as they have 30 minutes to disarm and destroy a plasma cannon before Cobra Command scores victory.
6. Race – Baroness races against the Joes to secure a stone of power.
7. Jungle – It seems that there are mysterious natural stones that have amazing technological powers that both Cobra and GI Joe are on the hunt for. When Zartan finds a Power Stone, it's up to Snake Eyes and Spirit to defeat Zartan and claim the Power Stone.
8. Vacation – The Joes take a vacation in Las Vegas where they end up stumbling onto a plot by Destro to use a casino as a front for developing a super-laser for Cobra Command.
9. Polar – Duke and the Joes head to Antarctica to infiltrate a Cobra Fortress. As Duke climbs perilous ice mountains to break into the fortress, the rest of the Joe team are fighting their way through legions of Cobra B.A.T.s with the Sigma Six Ice Saber vehicles.
10. Honor – When a Power Stone is discovered on Mount Arashikage, Snake Eyes competes with Storm Shadow to get to it. Meanwhile, Jinx and Kamakura fight the Dreadnoks.
11. Space – When Scott Abernathy and his friends are visiting Cape Douglas rocket base, Cobra Command takes over the base and plans to launch a massive rocket into space to wreak havoc on the Earth.
12. Zeus Pt. 1 – Utilizing the Power Stones, Cobra Command creates the Zeus, a giant robot of unstoppable power. To help power the Zeus, Storm Shadow kidnaps Spud.
13. Zeus Pt. 2 – The Joes have to come together and use their combined technology to rescue Spud and destroy Zeus before it destroys the city.

==== Season 2 ====
1. Hidden – Cobra Commander sends Zartan and the Dreadnoks to steal a plasma weapon from London. Sigma 6 are joined in the fight by their new allies Lt. Stone and Firefly.
2. Invasion – When a computer virus planted by a traitor in Sigma 6 shuts down Sigma 6's new base called the Sea Titan, Cobra Command takes the opportunity to attack in full force. The traitor also plants a chip in the Dragonhawk as part of Cobra Command's plot.
3. Search – Following the attack on the Sea Titan, Sigma 6 plans to sneak into a Cobra base in order to find out what they are up to and to find the Dragonhawk. When Lt. Stone's position is compromised and Sigma 6's position is betrayed, a risky choice is made that involves launching a missile at the Cobra base even if it destroys everyone and everything in it.
4. Showdown – Cobra Command plans a heist to steal a nanotechnology sample from the Central Museum and Sigma 6 moves in to stop it...but waiting for them is Destro, who uses this opportunity as a chance to test his new "Brain Ripper" mind control device! Hi-Tech is the only member of Sigma 6 left standing...can he and his latest gadgets stop Destro and his insidious Mantis Mech all on his own?
5. Challenge – Tunnel Rat loses a bet and must train to become a ninja. He joins Kamakura, Snake Eyes, and Jinx on a trip to Central America, but Storm Shadow and Baroness are waiting...
6. Trap – Snake Eyes falls into a trap in wintery Romania and Duke, Scarlett and Heavy Duty come in to rescue him. However, they end up trapped themselves by Destro and the heat is on. Will Snake Eyes and his new wolf friend be able to save them in time?
7. Revelations – The traitor in Sigma 6 is revealed as its members are being captured one-by-one. Duke must use the experimental plasma armor created by Hi-Tech to go to Cobra's base and rescue them.
8. Duel – After fighting through an army of B.A.T.s, Duke must fight through the high-ranking B.A.T.s before his fight with Cobra Commander. Meanwhile, Lt. Stone frees himself and Scarlett in order to free the other Sigma 6 members and duel Firefly.
9. Awards – In this clip episode, Duke holds an award show at the Sea Titan to commemorate the various moments in Sigma 6 history.
10. Balance – When Overkill gets hold of a top-secret biochip, he's able to integrate his synthetic biology with the power of the machine and build a powerful body to battle Sigma Six. Then he tries to steal the remaining chips and turn the world into an electronic extension of himself, and the unlikely pair of Hi-Tech and Spirit is sent to stop him.
11. Giant – Zartan and the Dreadnoks work on a power core where some of its liquids ends up enlarging some insects to giant size.
12. Ice – With the construction of two Terrordromes at the North Pole and the South Pole, Cobra Commander uses a weather-controlling machine in order to hold the world for ransom after Baroness and Storm Shadow freeze the world leaders. When it comes to the Terrordrome at the South Pole, Snake Eyes fights Firefly while Jinx, Kamakura, and Tunnel Rat destroy the weather-controlling machine there.
13. Assault – Following the destruction of the Terrordrome at the South Pole, the scattered members of Sigma 6 must make a rescue operation at the North Pole to free Snake Eyes and stop Cobra.

== Characters ==
The main characters, depicted counterclockwise from top to bottom: Heavy Duty, Long Range, Snake Eyes, Duke, Tunnel Rat and Scarlett

=== G.I. Joe ===
- General Hawk (voiced by Tony Salerno) – Leader and adviser to the G.I. Joe Team.
- Duke (voiced by Andrew Paull in 2005, Greg Abbey in 2006–2007) – Field commander of the G.I. Joe Team.
- Snake Eyes (voiced by Jason Griffith in early flashbacks) – A silent ninja commando.
  - Jinx (voiced by Lisa Ortiz in 2005, Liza Jacqueline in 2006–2007) – Snake Eyes' female apprentice and ninja-in-training.
  - Kamakura (voiced by Michael Sinterniklaas in 2005, Marc Thompson in 2006–2007) – Snake Eyes' male apprentice and ninja-in-training.
- Scarlett (voiced by Amy Birnbaum in 2005, Veronica Taylor in 2006–2007) – Counterintelligence specialist, helicopter pilot and Second in Command to Duke.
- Tunnel Rat (voiced by Michael Sinterniklaas in 2005, Sebastian Arcelus in 2006–2007) – Infiltration and demolitions specialist, and ninja-in-training.
- Long Range (voiced by Scottie Ray) – Driver of the R.O.C.C. (the Joe team's Mobile Command), transportation specialist and the team sniper. In the Spanish dubbed versions of Sigma 6, he is called Zondo.
- Heavy Duty (voiced by F.B. Owens) – In charge of artillery.
- Hi-Tech (voiced by Eric Stuart) – Electronics expert, hacker, communications expert and inventor.
  - H.O.U.N.D. – Short for Hybrid Operations and Utility Networking Device, H.O.U.N.D. is Hi-Tech's support robot that is introduced in episode 17.
- Spirit Iron-Knife (voiced by Darren Dunstan) – Expert tracker and shaman.
  - Billy the Falcon – Spirit's pet falcon.
- Lt. Stone (voiced by Dan Green) – Pilot of the Dragonhawk Heavy Armored Drop Ship, covert-ops specialist, and the former commander of Firefly. His eyepatch actually conceals a special eyepiece that can scan and duplicate the clothing of anyone.

=== Cobra ===
- Cobra Commander (voiced by Marc Thompson) – Cobra leader.
- Destro (voiced by Marc Thompson) – Cobra's weapon maker and inventor.
- Baroness (voiced by Bella Hudson in 2005, Kayzie Rogers in 2006–2007) – Intelligence officer.
- Storm Shadow (voiced by Tom Wayland in 2005, Ted Lewis in 2006–2007) – A ninja who was captured and brainwashed by Cobra where he acts as Cobra Commander's bodyguard. He refers to Snake Eyes as his "brother".
- Overkill (voiced by Madeleine Blaustein) – A robotic scientist planning to rule Cobra himself with an army of B.A.T.s. He was first seen recuperating in a rejuvenation tank. Near the end of season 2, Overkill was finally able to create himself a body and is removed from his healing tank.
- Firefly (voiced by Sean Schemmel) – Sabotage, demolitions and electronic warfare expert, and spy. He was a former soldier that worked under Lt. Stone.
- Dreadnoks – A biker gang that is associated with Cobra.
  - Zartan (voiced by Marc Thompson) – Master of disguise and leader of the Dreadnoks. His costume contains holographic generators that help him assume the form of anyone.
  - Buzzer (voiced by Wayne Grayson) – Chainsaw-wielding member of the Dreadnoks.
  - Torch (voiced by David Brimmer / Ted Lewis) – Flamethrower-wielding Dreadnok.
  - Machete (voiced by David Brimmer in 2005, Eric Stuart in 2006–2007) – A shotgun with bayonet-toting member of the Dreadnok that is exclusive to the TV series. He is loosely based on Ripper.
- Cobra Troopers (various voices) – Basic Cobra infantry troopers who serve as communications experts, computer specialists, security, and soldiers. Dressed in white armor and a black jumpsuit. They are generally depicted as unintelligent and slightly cowardly.
- B.A.T. – Standard Cobra Battle Android Trooper which is a basic exoskeleton with two laser cannons in each hand. They come in different models.
  - Ninja B.A.T. – A ninja-type B.A.T.
  - Aero-B.A.T. – These B.A.T.s had wings.
  - Cobra Mantis – A B.A.T. unit driven by Destro in episode 17.
  - Overlord Vector – A B.A.T. with a snake torso.
  - Overlord Virus – A ninja-type B.A.T. that was sent to Japan as backup for Storm Shadow, the Dreadnoks, and the Ninja B.A.T.s. Under the influence of power stone, it is almost invincible where it can repair itself.
  - Overlord Vortex – A B.A.T. with a single red eye, two laser-firing arm cannons, and tank-like wheels for feet. Its metal hide is very hard to penetrate.
  - Zeus – A Mega-B.A.T. created by Destro to destroy Megalo City. Zeus's AI is run by the captured Spud.

=== Others ===
- Scott Abernathy (voiced by Matthew Labyorteaux in 2005, Pete Capella in 2006–2007) – General Hawk's son and honorary member of Sigma 6.
  - Spud (voiced by Anthony Salerno) – Scott's robot dog who was created in Hackfield Science Academy using Overkill's venom. Unlike Overkill's creations, it can quickly adapt in combat.

== Comics ==
G.I. Joe: Sigma 6 was a six-issue mini-series written for a younger audience, based on the toyline and animated TV series of the same name. While the series was out of continuity with the main comic universe, the characters are largely the same: Hawk is the commanding officer, Duke is the field leader, and there is a connection between the ninjas Snake Eyes and Storm Shadow.

== See also ==
- G.I. Joe: Renegades, the most recent animated G.I. Joe series, featuring many of the same characters.
