= Doctor Mindbender =

Character from the G.I. Joe franchise

- G.I. Joe character
- Art by Mike Zeck
- First appearance: G.I. Joe issue #44 (February 1986)
- Portrayed by: Kevin J. O'Connor
- Voiced by: Brian Cummings (Sunbow/Marvel); Jim Foronda (Spy Troops and Valor vs. Venom); Charlie Schlatter (Renegades); Lucas Schuneman (G.I. Joe: Operation Blackout)

In-universe information
- Affiliation: Cobra
- Specialty: Scientist; Master of Mind Control
- File name: Brian Binder
- SN: 4712–MB
- Primary MOS: Mind Control
- Secondary MOS: Orthodontics; Experimental Systems

Doctor Mindbender, also known as Doctor Bender, is a fictional character from the G.I. Joe: A Real American Hero toyline, comic books and animated series. He is a scientist who works for the terrorist organization Cobra; like other characters in the fictional universe, his characterization has fluctuated from that of comical villain to dangerous fascist depending on the release. He is often allied with Cobra Commander and Destro. In his first live-action film appearance in 2009, he was played by American actor Kevin J. O'Connor.

== Profile ==
Dr. Bender was at one time a peace-loving orthodontist. He built a machine to relieve dental pain, using electric brainwave stimulation. Unfortunately he tested it on himself, and it went haywire, causing him to become hateful, deceitful, and vain. Though experiencing brain damage, he retained his sense of scientific skill and intellect, unfortunately choosing to use it for the purposes of evil. Dr. Mindbender abandoned his practice and joined forces with Cobra, devoting all his time to perfecting his digital brain-scrambling. He is a master of mind control and interrogation, but his expertise also includes genetics, cloning, orthodontistry, and some cybernetics.

In the "Mega-Monsters" line, Doctor Mindbender did some splicing to some of the soldiers on Cobra Commanders' orders:

- When it came to the Bio-Vipers, Doctor Mindbender created them from some Eels where they were spliced with the DNA of giant squids, moray eels, piranhas, rockfish, and sharks. This piscine humanoid form gave them glowing moray eel-like eyes, piranha-like teeth, shark skin with rockfish-like scales that is pressure resistant and thermal, giant squid tentacles, and webbed feet that their file cards described to be platypus-shaped. They also wear a special torso suit that is spear-proof and water-resistant.
- When it came to the Monstro-Vipers, Doctor Mindbender created them from some Range-Vipers where they were spliced with the DNA of bats, large Bigfoot-like creatures, gruesome grizzly bears, and rabid werewolves. This form gave them mixed Bigfoot/grizzly bear/werewolf fur, a wolf-like head, bat-like eyes that enable them to see in the dark, a finger-fused grizzly bear-like right hand with a powershot arm mechanism in their right arm, an armor-plated bionic left hand, disfigured protruding bones, and Bigfoot feet that are thorn resistant. Their inner body chambers enable them to produce regurgitating gut bombs.

As an added bonus, Doctor Mindbender has placed some computer-integrated brain and body override chips on the Bio-Vipers and the Monstro-Vipers so that they won't turn on Cobra while also having them controlled by the Cyber-Vipers and trained by the Mega-Vipers.

== Toys ==
Doctor Mindbender was first released as an action figure in 1986. The Dr. Mindbender toy was bare chested with purple pants and leather metal-studded suspenders.

A new version of Doctor Mindbender (appearing more cybernetically enhanced, in yellow and purple attire) was released in 1993 as part of the Battle Corps line.

In November 2014, it was announced by the G.I. Joe Collector's Club that their 2015 exclusive 3.75" membership figure would be an Arctic Doctor Mindbender figure, based directly on his appearance in G.I. Joe: The Movie.

== Comic series ==
=== Marvel Comics ===
In the Marvel Comics G.I. Joe series, he first appears in issue #44, as "Dr. Brain-Wave". Mindbender became Cobra's primary science officer, after his predecessor Doctor Venom was killed in action. He creates the Battle Android Troopers (B.A.T.s), and also makes several modifications to Venom's prized creation, the Brainwave Scanner.

Dr. Mindbender also creates the composite-clone Serpentor in an attempt to engineer the ultimate soldier. He and other Cobra agents raid the tombs of noted military leaders, such as Genghis Khan and Alexander the Great for DNA. Dr. Mindbender also takes the opportunity to add in the DNA of the ninja Storm Shadow. Mindbender loyally serves Serpentor. Mindbender analyzes Cobra satellite photos and pieces together the location of the Joe's new Utah base. A civil war, between Serpentor and Fred VII, a Crimson Guardsman posing as Cobra Commander, breaks out on Cobra Island. When Serpentor is killed by Zartan, Mindbender switches sides, becoming an advisor to Fred VII. Even then he was not loyal, listening to a plan that would seemingly allow Cobra Commander to be cloned.

Eventually the original, non-clone Cobra Commander returns, and threw all perceived traitors, including Mindbender, into a landlocked freighter on Cobra Island. Mindbender manages to preserve Serpentor's body, which was thought by many to be destroyed. The freighter itself is then buried inside a mountain. Though an escape plan was devised, Mindbender, along with some of the other traitors, dies of botulism before it could be enacted.

However, he was later cloned, and returns to loyally serve Cobra Commander for a time. The clone recognizes Megatron as a Decepticon (though not necessarily as Megatron himself) when he is first reanimated, in a reference to the G.I. Joe and the Transformers comic series by Marvel in the 1980s. Mindbender's clone was created by Cobra Commander at around the same time as the launch of the Transformers: Generation 2 comic series, and Megatron and a number of Autobots appear in a few issues of G.I. Joe at that same time.

=== Devil's Due ===
Mindbender plays a major role in the first story-arc of the series G.I. Joe: Frontline. This takes place in the last few weeks of the original incarnation of the G.I. Joe Team. Cobra forces have consolidated at Destro's castle. Mindbender involves himself heavily in the trickery and deceit that results, when Cobra forces battle G.I. Joe throughout the castle for control of a space-based weapon.

Several years after, Cobra re-organizes. One of Mindbender's new projects is a new, more powerful Battle Android Trooper. This is stolen by the ninja-mercenary Firefly.

When Serpentor returns, leading a renegade faction called The Coil, Mindbender returns to the side of his creation. When Serpentor is defeated again, Mindbender is captured, but manages to convince Cobra Commander to spare his life, by offering him control of his latest creation, a weapon of mass destruction called the Tempest.

Mindbender ends up on the run over Cobra Island, trying and failing to escape with the Joe agent Barrel Roll. Mindbender is seen running into the forest, pursued by Cobra Vipers.

Commander gains control of the Tempest. He also shoots Mindbender in the back, killing him. According to the Data Desk, Mindbender is buried an unmarked grave in Potter's Field, sharing the same fate as Dr. Venom, the mad scientist that he replaced.

=== IDW Comics ===
It is shown that Dr. Mindbender has played a role in many of the major scientific discoveries throughout the 20th century (including the development of the Atom Bomb, and something that is highly suggested to be the implementation of the polio vaccine). His main motivation is to fully exploit human intellectual capabilities so that humanity can replace God.

=== G.I. Joe 2019 ===
In this alternate universe, Doctor Mindbender is scientific enforcer for Cobra, which has conquered most of the free world. Major Bludd discovers that Mindbender and many other Cobra forces are working with the weapons supplier Destro, which is considered traitorous. Bludd forms an uneasy friendship with Mindbender. They both fear that Cobra Commander's idealism threatens his otherwise shaky hold on what he does control.

== Novels ==
Dr. Mindbender is the main villain of the gamebook-style G.I. Joe novel Operation: Mindbender (ISBN 0-345-33786-7). In the story, Mindbender perfects a brainwashing process resulting in G.I. Joe members violently attacking their friends and allies.

== Animated series ==
=== Sunbow ===
Mindbender is Cobra's chief interrogator and science officer. He hates Cobra Commander, who calls him "Fender-Bender". In his first appearance, the second-season miniseries "Arise, Serpentor, Arise!", he is shown to be the inventor of B.A.T.s, telling Cobra Commander that they would have been useful against G.I. Joe had they been deployed correctly. Inspired by a strange, recurring dream, Mindbender decides to create a new leader for Cobra. He collaborates with Destro and Tomax and Xamot in a plot to obtain DNA samples of the best militaristic minds in history, because he feels Cobra needs a leader that can inspire courage in its cowardly troops. Mindbender attempts to steal the DNA of Chinese general Sun Tzu, but the theft is foiled by Sgt. Slaughter, whose DNA Mindbender then intends to use as a substitute. While the tomb of Genghis Khan is stolen, Mindbender has Sgt. Slaughter lured into being captured. Despite Cobra Commander and Sgt. Slaughter's attempts to sabotage his experiment, Mindbender succeeds, resulting in the creation of Serpentor.

Doctor Mindbender is easily Serpentor's most loyal member of Cobra's High command (and as such Serpentor trusted Doctor Mindbender the most out of the Cobra High Command, even being exceptionally lenient if a mission's failure is Mindbender's fault), but there are times when he considers the monarch to be a "spoiled brat".

He becomes a recurring character in season 2. In his appearances, Mindbender is often in charge of Cobra science projects and working with Serpentor or the Dreadnoks. He invents machines or weapons to use against the Joes, such as the nightmare-causing Sombulator and an organ that controls emotions with its music. Dr. Mindbender had a major role in "My Brother's Keeper", in which he recruits scientist Jeremy Penser to help fix a device called the Voltronic Galaxitor.

==== G.I. Joe: The Movie ====
In the 1987 animated film G.I. Joe: The Movie, it is revealed that the idea to create Serpentor was planted in Mindbender's brain by Golobulus (the leader of Cobra-La) using a "Psychic Motivator". Doctor Mindbender appears outraged by this, as he had thought of Serpentor as his own creation, but he quickly falls into line and begins serving Cobra-La. Doctor Mindbender is present in the final battle with Cobra and Cobra-La against the Joes.

=== Spy Troops and Valor vs. Venom ===
In the new continuity set by the CGI animated movies, Doctor Mindbender once again serves as Cobra's chief scientist. In G.I. Joe: Spy Troops, he creates a new and improved Battle Android Trooper, and uses stolen G.I. Joe technology to create headsets which allow Destro and Storm Shadow to control the B.A.T.s in battle. Doctor Mindbender is also working on Venom Troopers, but ultimately loses all of his research when the Cobra base is destroyed. Cobra Commander flippantly tells him to start over, leaving Doctor Mindbender shocked and appalled at such a suggestion.

For G.I. Joe: Valor vs. Venom, Doctor Mindbender has rebuilt all of his research, and the Venom project is now fully up and running. Thanks to Doctor Mindbender's genius, Cobra begins kidnapping people from around the world and turning them into animal/human hybrids. Doctor Mindbender warns Cobra Commander about putting too much Venom into a single subject but the Commander ignores him. The captured General Hawk is transformed into Venomous Maximus, a being so powerful he quickly seizes power of Cobra with the help of Overkill. Cobra Commander and Doctor Mindbender are captured by Maximus and Overkill. As the Joes attack while Maximus goes to launch his Venom missile, Doctor Mindbender is forced to join forces with his G.I. Joe rival, Hi-Tech, and work against Maximus. They reverse the polarity of the Venom missiles, which in turn destroy Cobra's base. In the confusion following the battle, Doctor Mindbender makes his escape.

=== Sigma 6 ===
Doctor Mindbender did not appear in G.I. Joe: Sigma 6. Instead, Overkill has taken over his role as Cobra's chief scientist.

=== Renegades ===
In G.I. Joe: Renegades, Doctor Mindbender appears as a young bio-scientist named Dr. Brian Bender who is wanted for his illegal experimentations. Hired by Cobra Commander, Mindbender uses Cobra Industries' connections to enable its leader to become immortal to cheat death. In the process, Mindbender developed the Bio Vipers which would serve as Cobra's militant power. However, the Joes infiltrated the lab where Mindbender created the first generation of Bio-Vipers and Ripcord sacrificed himself to destroy it. Though thought to be dead, Mindbender found Ripcord's comatose body and learned that the young man absorbed Bio-Viper matter and turned into a human/Bio-Viper hybrid to help in his research. Through the first season, being pursued by the Joes, Mindbender sought to improve on his Bio-Vipers by exploring a variety of ways, including holding Tomax and Xamot captive to use their psychic ability to modify the Bio Vipers.

In "Prodigal" when the Joes find an amnesiac Ripcord and break him out of the hospital, Mindbender assured Cobra Commander that this would be a good chance to test Ripcord's Bio-Viper form on the Joes by using the Cobra Drones to take control through the control chip in Ripcord. But when Ripcord breaks himself free from his control, Cobra Commander decides to have Serpentor devour Mindbender for failing him. However, Mindbender is quick to remind Cobra Commander that he still needs him to cheat death when threatening to expose his condition to the other subordinates. Though Cobra Commander allows Mindbender to live for now while punishing him with an electrical blast from his cane, promising the doctor that Ripcord's retrieval is vital for both of them to live.

In "The Anomaly", Doctor Mindbender tries to create his human/Bio-Viper hybrid. The first one seems to fall apart but actually comes together in the sewers. When the Sewer Viper is mistaken as a Sewer Monster in New York, Cobra Commander sends Doctor Mindbender to reclaim it for sending some of Cobra's elite soldiers would end up having the Sewer Viper traced back to Cobra Industries. Doctor Mindbender manages to bring some Bio-Vipers along and have a fail-safe installed in the Bio-Vipers that would cause them to explode enough to level a section of the city in the event that Doctor Mindbender's neuro-link helmet is separated from him. When his Bio-Vipers managed to trap the Joes and Tunnel Rat's brother Teddy in the subway, Doctor Mindbender uses his neuro-link helmet to take control of Ripcord. When the Sewer Viper attacks, Doctor Mindbender tries to take control of it only for it to not have a control chip in it. The Sewer Viper manages to remove the control chip from Ripcord's head freeing him from Doctor Mindbender's control. Ripcord manages to destroy the neuro-link helmet and was about to take revenge on Doctor Mindbender for what he did for him only for Duke to intervene. When the Bio-Vipers start to explode, the Sewer Viper ends up sacrificing itself to absorb the blast while Doctor Mindbender escapes.

In the "Revelations" two-parter, Doctor Mindbender and Destro end up working on rebuilding the M.A.S.S. Device that Scarlett's father Professor Patrick O'Hara worked on while attempting to replicate the crystal needed to power it. Scarlett and Snake Eyes fight Baroness and Doctor Mindbender in the room where the M.A.S.S. device is before the Bio-Vipers restraint them so Scarlett can be forced into entering the code to the M.A.S.S. Device using Snake Eyes as bait. The M.A.S.S. Device is a success as Professor Patrick O'Hara emerges from the M.A.S.S. device. After Snake Eyes ends up destroying the M.A.S.S. Device, its destruction causes a wormhole that sucks Baroness and Doctor Mindbender in. It is unknown what happened to them.

== Live action film ==
Doctor Mindbender
- G.I. Joe character
- First appearance: 2009
- Portrayed by: Kevin J. O'Connor

In-universe information
- Affiliation: Cobra
- Specialty: Master of Mind Control
- File name: CLASSIFIED
- Birth place: CLASSIFIED
- SN: Classified
- Rank: Classified
- Primary MOS: Mind Control
- Secondary MOS: Unknown
- Series: G.I. Joe: The Rise of Cobra

Doctor Mindbender also appears in a flashback in the 2009 film G.I. Joe: The Rise of Cobra played by Kevin J. O'Connor. In the remainder of the film the character known as 'The Doctor' is implied to be Doctor Mindbender by his characteristic monocle. It is revealed that he passed the secrets of nano-technology on to Rex Lewis (played by Joseph Gordon-Levitt), who was 'The Doctor' before assuming his Cobra Commander persona. His fate in the film is unclear; their laboratory is destroyed (leading to the Commander's severe scarring) but Rex tells Duke that Doctor Mindbender trained him in nanotechnology after the attack. In the DVD release, additional dialogue indicates that Doctor Mindbender survived, and director Stephen Sommers notes in the commentary that there is a good chance Doctor Mindbender would return in a sequel. However, he does not appear in G.I. Joe: Retaliation.

== Popular culture ==
- Doctor Mindbender appears in the Robot Chicken episode "Joint Point", voiced by Seth Green. In a documentary segment that parodies the Terror Drome in the style of The Office, Doctor Mindbender explains how he runs a class to train the Cobra Organization's new recruits.
- The figure receives a brief mention in the Stephen King Companion non-fiction essay collection.
- The character is described on page 128 of the magazine The New Yorker. Volume 62, 1986.
- Another mention is made in the book Out of the Garden: Toys and Children's Culture in the Age of TV Marketing.
