= Dale Wilson (actor) =

Canadian voice actor (1942–2025)

- Born: Dale Edward Wilson; December 31, 1942; Oak Park, Illinois, U.S.
- Died: January 6, 2025 (aged 82)
- Occupation: Voice actor
- Years active: 1970–2018

Dale Edward Wilson (December 31, 1942 – January 6, 2025) was an American-born Canadian voice actor. He was best known as the voice of Cell, Kami, and Android 8 in the Ocean Productions dub of Dragon Ball Z and for credits in several Western cartoons, such as G.I. Joe 1989 DiC series voicing numerous characters such as the narrator of the opening, as well as Capt. Grid-Iron, Mutt, Overkill, Skydive; Toa Lewa and Turaga Onewa in Bionicle: Mask of Light; Edward Kelly in X-Men: Evolution; Ja-Kal in Mummies Alive!; and Paw Pooch in Krypto the Superdog. He was the announcer for the opening and closing ceremonies at the 2010 Winter Olympics in Vancouver. He also appeared in films, including Who'll Save Our Children? (1978) and Dead Wrong (1983).

== Early life ==
Wilson was born on December 31, 1942 in Oak Park, Illinois.

== Death ==
Wilson died from complications of prostate cancer and Parkinson's disease on January 6, 2025, aged 82.

== Dubbing roles ==
=== Animation ===
List of English dubbing performances in animation
Year	Title	Role	Notes	Source
1996–2003	Dragon Ball Z	Cell, Kami, King Yemma, Android 8, and Goz	Ocean dub	
1999	AWOL: Absent Without Leave	Jim Hyatt	Ocean dub	
2000–2002	Cardcaptors	Clow Reed	Nelvana dub	
2000	The Vision of Escaflowne	Duke Fried	Ocean dub	
2002	Transformers Armada	Smokescreen	Ocean dub	
2003	Master Keaton	Stuart Pitock and Bruce Kendall	Ocean dub	
2003	Zoids Fuzors	Haldo	Voicebox dub	
2005	Human Crossing	Professor Okawa	Ocean dub	
2005	Transformers Cybertron	Mudflap	Voicebox dub	
2005	Tetsujin 28	Doctor and Arimoto	Ocean dub	
2007	Black Lagoon	Watsap	Ocean dub	
2007	The Story of Saiunkoku	Advisor So	Ocean dub	
2008	Mobile Suit Gundam 00	Pang Hercury	Ocean dub	

=== Film ===
List of English dubbing performances in direct-to-video and television films
Year	Title	Role	Notes	Source
2001	Jin-Roh: The Wolf Brigade	Bunmei Muroto	Ocean dub	
2002	Cardcaptor Sakura: The Movie	Clow Reed	Nelvana dub	

== Filmography ==
=== Animation ===
List of voice performances in animation
Year	Title	Role	Notes	Source
1989	G.I. Joe: A Real American Hero	Capt. Grid-Iron, Mutt, Overkill, Skydive		
1991	Bucky O'Hare and the Toad Wars!	Bruiser and Bruce		
1992	The Adventures of T-Rex	Big Boss Graves		
1993	The Bots Master	Sir Lewis Leon Paradim		
1993	Exosquad	Galba		
1994–2001	ReBoot	Welman Matrix and Fake Megabyte		
1995	Darkstalkers	Sasquatch and Dragon		
1995–1997	Street Fighter	Akuma, Mike Haggar		
1997	Mummies Alive!	Ja-Kal		
1998–2001	Fat Dog Mendoza	The Swoosh, Pops, Power Plus Man, Glen Headstrong		
2000	X-Men: Evolution	Edward Kelly		
2000–2005	Dragon Tales	Squink and Trumpy		
2002–2003	Stargate Infinity	Major Gus Bonner		
2003–2006	Martin Mystery	Java the Caveman		
2005–2006	Krypto the Superdog	Paw Pooch		
2006–2008	Pucca	Linguini		
2011	The Little Prince	Hannibal		
2012	Iron Man: Armored Adventures	Robert Kelly		
2013–2018	Superbook	Ninevite King, Cornelius		

=== Film ===
List of voice performances in direct-to-video and television films
Year	Title	Role	Notes	Source
1997	Warriors of Virtue	Lai		
2002	Barbie as Rapunzel	Silversmith		
2002	Sabrina: Friends Forever	Mr. Rancid		
2002	Inspector Gadget's Last Case: Claw's Revenge	Devon Debonair		
2002	The Amazing Zorro	Captain Ramon		
2003	Ben Hur	Sheik Ilderim, Angel Gabriel		
2003	Bionicle: Mask of Light	Toa Lewa, Turaga Onewa		
2004	In Search of Santa	King Calvin		
