= Stone (G.I. Joe) =

Lt. Stone is the name of three different fictional characters from the G.I. Joe franchise. Each one of them are featured in a different continuity: two Lieutenants (appearing in both the animated series and comic books for G.I. Joe Extreme and G.I. Joe: Sigma 6), and a Sergeant (portrayed by Brendan Fraser in the film G.I. Joe: The Rise of Cobra). In addition to these each of them have an action figure in the line of toys by Hasbro.

== G.I. Joe Extreme ==
Lt. Stone
- G.I. Joe character
- Lieutenant. Stone in G.I. Joe Extreme
- First appearance: 1995
- Voiced by: Garry Chalk

In-universe information
- Affiliation: G.I. Joe
- Specialty: Field Leader
- File name: Danny W. Stone
- Birth place: Unknown
- SN: 4YH881UN
- Rank: O-1
- Primary MOS: Tactical Warfare
- Subgroups: USMC

A Marine field commander, both Sgt. Savage and he previously worked together in counter-terrorism. After foiling an attempted kidnapping by SKAR soldiers, both were approached by Mr. Clancy to form a new G.I. Joe Team. Stone handpicked the rest of the team and personally oversees all their missions.

The first one to suspect Count von Rani of treachery, Stone went over Clancy's head to spy on the Count (To Catch a Klaw). Late in the first season, after an encounter with Rampage, Stone would be infected with a viral weapon that turned him into a living timebomb. Not wishing to harm the team, Stone went after Rampage alone, intending to at least take out the villain along with himself. Instead he was cured, but soon found himself on the run when SKAR briefly seized control of America. Along with his team, this attempt was thwarted and Iron Klaw apparently killed.

Stone, however, did not believe Iron Klaw as really dead, and eventually concluded that he had replaced Clancy. Upon confronting him, Stone was beaten by Iron Klaw and lay in a coma for some time. Upon recovering, Stone immediately began searching for Clancy, finding him being held captive by the Tong crime syndicate in Hong Kong at the behest of SKAR. After rescuing his old friend, Stone set out to take down Iron Klaw once and for all.

Two versions of Lt. Stone were released carded as part of the G.I. Joe Extreme toyline in 1995. A third figure with battle damage was released in a 2-pack with Iron Klaw.

=== Dark Horse Comics ===
Lt. Stone appears since the first issue in the comic continuity as the field commander of the new G.I. Joe team. It is never stated at what point the team was formed but the date of 2009 is given in their first mission.

== G.I. Joe: Sigma 6 ==
Lt. Stone
- G.I. Joe character
- First appearance: 2006
- Voiced by: Dan Green

In-universe information
- Affiliation: G.I. Joe
- Specialty: Covert-Ops Specialist
- File name: Daniel Will Stone
- Birth place: Avonmouth, Bristol, England
- SN: S6PF7773
- Rank: O-2
- Primary MOS: Lieutenant (Commando)
- Secondary MOS: Rotatory wing aircraft pilot
- Subgroups: MI6

Lt. Stone is a British Joe agent, an experienced pilot, and an old friend of General Hawk and Duke. Duke and he were in ops-training together. He first appears in season 2 of the series. He and Firefly join the Sigma 6 team and officially hand over the Sea Titan to Duke, which is to be their new base. Stone had been overseeing the Sea Titan project on behalf of General Hawk. The ship functions as a self-sustained base, has advanced weaponry, and is capable of underwater transport. It also comes with the Dragonhawk, a heavy armour dropship that Stone flies.

Not much is revealed of his background as he is a covert-ops specialist. As a matter of fact, Firefly describes him as the best spy he's ever known. His left arm, injured during a battle with Cobra, has been replaced with a bionic arm made of ultra-hard dimantium metal. His eyepatch actually conceals a special eyepiece that can scan and duplicate the clothing of anyone. He's an exceptional pilot, and often tends to show off his expertise. For a while, after both he and Firefly join the team, Cobra keeps managing to hack the Sigma 6 systems or find out about their plans much ahead. This leads most of the team to assume that Stone is a traitor and walk into a trap set by Firefly who had switched sides. Though Duke and Stone suspect him for some time they are unable to draw him out before nearly the whole team is captured. Firefly openly declares his loyalty to Cobra. He and Stone face each other off. Stone even offers him a chance to return to Sigma 6 after defeating him. Firefly refuses and escapes. As Stone had once been a mentor to Firefly the treachery affects him deeply and there is a marked change in his character after this episode. He becomes more reserved and seems much less self-assured.

Lt. Stone and Firefly are separate entities from their 'A Real American Hero' and 'Extreme' counterparts.

As depicted in his only file-card within the toy-line, he is an elite member of a well-known British intelligence agency (probably MI6). He prefers to be called a spy rather than a covert ops agent, because "spy" accurately describes the daring, devious, and dangerous nature of his work. He is highly skilled at cracking codes, reading ancient languages, and solving mysteries. His fascination with secrets has led him to collect many gadgets with hidden weapons and devices. He is an expert at disguise and repeatedly infiltrates Cobra dressed as one of its members. As pure speculation, Stone could be loosely based on the founder of MI6, Mansfield Cumming. They both share an interest in strange devices. Cummings had a pilot's licence, a wooden leg, and was known for eccentric plans and elaborate disguises.

Lt. Stone was released in 2006 in the Commando Action Figure Assortment as part of the Sigma 6 line. Lt. Stone featured accessories to disguise himself as a Cobra Trooper or Zartan, along with other accessories. Hasbro also released the Dragonhawk that comes with a dropcage including Snake Eye's hoverbike, and a removable Lt. Stone figurine.

=== Devil's Due Comics ===
Lt. Stone appears on the cover to America's Elite #25 as part of a massive group shot of anyone who ever been a member of the Joe Team. During the World War III event, Lt. Stone has a cameo in America's Elite #31, fighting Iron Grenadiers in Suffolk, England alongside fellow Joes Big Ben (also a British member of G.I. Joe), Short-Fuze, and Hit & Run.

== Live action film ==
Sgt. Stone
- G.I. Joe character
- Brendan Fraser as Sgt. Stone in G.I. Joe: The Rise of Cobra
- First appearance: 2009
- Portrayed by: Brendan Fraser

In-universe information
- Affiliation: G.I. Joe
- Specialty: Special Operations Instructor
- File name: Geoffrey T. Stone IV
- SN: 501-13-LS47
- Rank: E-5
- Primary MOS: American Commando
- Secondary MOS: Marksman
- Series: G.I. Joe: The Rise of Cobra

Brendan Fraser plays Stone in the 2009 film G.I. Joe: The Rise of Cobra. At first, it was reported he was going to play Gung-Ho in the movie, but it was later revealed by director Stephen Sommers to be otherwise. In the film, he referees a sparring match between Duke and Snake-Eyes, shocked at the former's unwillingness to stay down from Snake Eyes' attacks.

He was released as an action figure in 2009, as part of the G.I. Joe: The Rise of Cobra toyline. An alternate version was released as part of the G.I. Joe Senior Ranking Officers set in 2009. His action figure file card indicates he is a special operations instructor who trains the G.I. Joe team in combat tactics, marksmanship, survival techniques, and other commando skills.
