= Torch (G.I. Joe) =

G.I. Joe character

- G.I. Joe character
- Torch as seen in the Sunbow/Marvel G.I. Joe cartoon.
- First appearance: Issue #25 (July 1984)
- Voiced by: Frank Welker (Sunbow/Marvel); Ted Lewis (Sigma 6); Matthew Yang King (Renegades)

In-universe information
- Affiliation: Dreadnoks
- File name: Tom Winken
- Birth place: Botany Bay, New South Wales, Australia

Torch is a fictional character from the G.I. Joe: A Real American Hero toyline, comic books and animated series. He is affiliated with Cobra as one of the Dreadnoks and debuted in 1984. He is often seen working closely with Buzzer and Ripper.

== Profile ==
His real name is Tom Winken. Torch was born in Botany Bay, New South Wales, Australia.

Torch was sent to live in Borstal reform school at age fourteen, but he escaped and joined the Merchant Marine, where he went to sea and learned how to use the cutting torch. He later joined the Melbourne Maulers motorcycle club. Torch is illiterate, unintelligent, and enjoys violence and mayhem especially when using his oxy-acetylene torch to alter stolen cars and for safe-cracking. He is also known to scavenge in swamps for enjoyment and to make money.

== Toys ==
Torch was first released as an action figure in 1985 and was discontinued in 1987. It was brought back for the GI Joe 25th anniversary.

== Comics ==
=== Marvel Comics ===
In the Marvel Comics G.I. Joe series, he first appeared in #25 The Dreadnoks' love for destruction causes an early warning for the staff at McGuire Air Force Base, after they spotted a Dragonfly landing there. Their vandalism sets off an explosion; the soldiers and G.I. Joe manage to set up a defense that drives off the Cobra troops. The Dreadnoks flee the attention of both sides.

Torch and Ripper get in trouble, after disobeying orders and losing Buzzer to a trio of Joes they had haphazardly attacked. Torch is seen in a running battle of Dreadnoks versus Joes in issue #51. This is after the others rescue Zartan from Joe HQ. Torch is a passenger on the outside of the Thunder Machine. He then participates in an attempt to kill Serpentor. He makes a cameo during an essential Cobra power struggle.

=== Devil's Due ===
Torch has made several cameos in the Devil's Due original G.I. Joe series. He participates when the Joes assault the Dreadnoks Florida Everglades headquarters. He assists when the Dreadnoks are involved in the purchase of a nuclear weapon. He is part of a grouping of Dreadnoks and Cobra officers who get into a running gun-fight with an out of control Battle Android Trooper. He almost gets his side killed when, misunderstanding Doctor Mindbender, he calls to nearby Joes, advising them to aim for the head. This would have resulted in a gigantic explosion.

In the alternate continuity of 'G.I.Joe Vs. The Transformers' Torch and his allies are upgraded with Cybertronian technology. In a dystopian future, an older Torch works for a crippled Duke, one of the few Joes left. They are past of a resistance against the murderous Decepticons. Seeing a chance to negate his terrible 'present', Torch violates orders and leads a time-lost Joe-Cobra team in their mission.

=== G.I. Joe 2019 ===
In this alternate universe, Torch is part of a collective of survivors in Indianapolis, a city Cobra had slaughtered as part of a plan to take over most of the world. The Dreadnoks, as the group is known, value being able to contribute as their first and only priority. This does not save them when a second group of Cobra robot troopers slaughter most of the Dreadnoks.

=== G.I. Joe Vs. Transformers 2 ===
Twenty years in the future, Torch is a trusted soldier under Duke, who leads the human resistance against a Transformers army. All of the Dreadnoks, except Ripper and Buzzer, have perished. Torch decides to go against orders to help time travelers, who have a faint chance of ensuring this horrible time never existed.

== Animated series ==
=== Sunbow ===
Torch first appeared in the G.I. Joe animated series in "The Revenge of Cobra" mini-series. He is voiced by Frank Welker.

In the episode "Lights! Camera! Cobra!", when the Dreadnoks are in a Hollywood area to steal a Cobra Firebat, Torch follows Shipwreck and Cover Girl, finding them fighting others in a pool hall. He calls the police, but is arrested. Later, the Joes send a message of them torturing and interrogating Torch (actually Recondo in disguise) to Cobra, prompting Cobra Commander to go rescue Torch, while the other Dreadnoks break the real Torch out of jail.

=== G.I. Joe: The Movie ===
Torch also appeared briefly in the 1987 animated film G.I. Joe: The Movie.

=== Sigma 6 ===
Torch appears in G.I. Joe: Sigma 6. He is seen as a member of the Dreadnoks.

=== Renegades ===
Torch first appeared in the G.I. Joe: Renegades episode "Dreadnoks Rising." This version is an African-American. He is seen as a member of the Dreadnoks.
