= Cobra Troopers =

- G.I. Joe character
- Cobra Viper figure released in 2008.
- First appearance: 1982
- Voiced by: Various actors

In-universe information
- Affiliation: Cobra
- Specialty: Mainly as infantry, but depends on the specific Viper class
- File name: Various
- Birth place: Various
- SN: Various
- Rank: Various
- Primary MOS: Various
- Secondary MOS: Various
- Series: All series, including cartoons and comics

The Cobra Troopers are the basic foot soldiers of the Cobra Organization, as part of the G.I. Joe: A Real American Hero toyline, comic books and animated series. They are generally depicted as legions of uniformed soldiers, nearly all of them masked to appear anonymous, and widely diversified according to specialties and functions.

== History ==
The Cobra Soldiers were introduced in 1982, with the code name "The Enemy". These are the basic infantry soldiers equipped with conventional military gear (as opposed to the more hi-tech accouterments of the later Vipers). They were prominently featured on both the animated and comic series, and depicted as unintelligent and slightly cowardly.

Cobra infantry troopers are issued a combination assault rifle and grenade launcher, with advanced night vision, telescopic sight, and range finder. Multi-layered body armor and composite helmets with built-in communications gear are standard issue. Vipers are superbly trained, formidably equipped, and highly motivated.

== Other Cobra troopers ==
Later, Cobra troopers consisted of communications troops, computer specialists, security, and soldiers. Some of the more prominent include:

=== Vipers ===
Viper is the code-name given to a large majority of the Cobra Troopers. With the exception of the Viper infantry trooper, the code name "Viper" is usually preceded by their area of expertise.

Introduced in 1986 as a replacement for the Cobra Soldiers, the Cobra Viper infantry soldiers complement the Cobra Soldiers in both the animated and comic series. The concept, originally introduced in 1985 with the introduction of "Tele-Vipers" (communication experts), quickly evolved into a catch-all suffix for Cobra troops.

Vipers can opt for additional training that enables them to transfer to specialized units, focusing on specific military specialties. These units are considered elite and are constantly examined for effectiveness. Some are renamed and reorganized, absorbed into other units, or sometimes completely phased out. Some units customize their chain of command, allowing for unique Viper designations with distinct leaders.

=== Eels ===
The Cobra Eels are the underwater demolition specialists of the Cobra legions. They undergo a rigorous two-part training program, first in the shark and pirate infested waters of the Caribbean, and then in the frigid depths of the North Atlantic. Their training regimen includes marine engineering, explosive ordnance, underwater fighting techniques, and marine geology. Eels are responsible for manning and operating Cobra marine outposts disguised as off-shore drilling rigs, and for augmenting the crews of large Cobra naval vessels.

=== Lampreys ===
The Cobra Lampreys are Cobra's amphibious assault troopers, responsible for operation of Cobra naval vehicles, patrol around naval bases and attack. They are culled from the Eel units, and are considered elite among Cobra naval troopers, with only the Cobra Morays considered higher. To qualify for Lamprey training, candidates must be a Cobra Trooper in top physical condition, have completed his Eel training, and have been operational as an Eel for more than a year. The training is highly selective, and more than 50% of the applicants quit before completing the course.

=== Morays ===
The Morays are the next step in marine warfare, deriving from elite members of the Eel division. They must undergo the same rigorous training program, which involves underwater fighting techniques, the study of marine geology, and the use of explosive ordnance. The Morays use the same bio-tech engineering as the Neo-Vipers, which gives them increased strength, underwater vision, and bodies that can better withstand the pressures of deep sea diving.

=== Snow Serpents ===
Snow Serpents are the Arctic Specialist branch of Cobra. They undergo the same rigorous training program as the Eels, with the addition of a six-month cold weather course, somewhere above the Arctic Circle. Other aspects of their training include airborne operations under arctic conditions, anti-tank procedures, and the use of snow-shoes, skis and kayaks.

=== Crimson Guard ===
The Crimson Guard are the most elite soldiers of Cobra's Viper legions, under the direct command of Tomax and Xamot, but completely loyal to Cobra Commander, serving as his personal guard.

=== Python Patrol ===
Python Patrol is a codename given to a subgroup of Vipers and other Cobra troops whose uniforms have undergone the "pythonization" process. This renders their uniforms immune to radar and other forms of electronic detection. The unit has been led by both Copperhead and Major Bludd. In one instance, Zarana leads a unit on an attack on G.I. Joe's headquarters, The Pit.

== List of Cobra troopers ==
- Air Devil - Acrobatic Aerial Assault Trooper
- B.A.T.s - Cobra's androids. Their name is short for Battle Android Troopers.
- Cobra Blackstar - Cobra Elite Space Pilot
- Cobra C.L.A.W.S. - Combat Light Armored Weapons Specialist; Heavy Weapons Trooper
- Cobra Coils - High Speed Pursuit Vehicle Drivers; Cobra Tread Fire Driver
- Cobra Eels - Cobra Frogman
- Cobra H.I.S.S. Driver - Cobra H.I.S.S. Driver
- Cobra Moray - Underwater Elite Trooper
- Cobra Officer - Cobra Squad Leader
- Cobra Stinger Driver - Cobra Stinger Driver
- Cobra Soldier - Cobra Basic Infantry
- Desert Scorpion - Cobra Desert Trooper
- Incinerators - Cobra Flamethrowers
- Lampreys - Cobra Moray Hydrofoil Pilot
- Night Creepers - Cobra Mercenary Ninjas
- Night Vulture - Cobra Air Recon Trooper
- Sea Slugs - Cobra Sea Ray Pilot
- Snow Serpent - Cobra Polar Assault
- W.O.R.M.S. - Weapons Ordnance Rugged Machine Specialists; Cobra Maggot Driver

=== List of Viper variations ===
- Aero-Viper - Condor Z25 pilot
- Air-Viper - Cobra Air Force trainee
- Alley Viper - Cobra urban assault trooper
- Astro-Viper - Cobranaut
- A.V.A.C. - Air-Viper, Advanced Class; Firebat pilot
- Bio-Viper - Amphibious Mega-Monster soldiers that were originally a team of Eels until Doctor Mindbender spliced their DNA with the DNA samples of giant squids, moray eels, piranhas, rockfish, and sharks that gave them a tentacled piscine humanoid appearance.
- Cobra Viper - Cobra infantry
- Cyber-Viper - Cybernetic officers created by Doctor Mindbender that are used to keep the Bio-Vipers and the Monstro-Vipers in line.
- Desert-Viper - Cobra desert trooper
- Elite-Viper - Elite regiment officer
- Fast Blast Viper - Field combat
- Flak-Viper - Cobra anti-aircraft trooper
- Frag-Viper - Cobra grenade thrower
- Gyro-Viper - Mamba pilot
- Hazard-Viper - Toxin specialist
- H.E.A.T. Viper - High-Explosive, Anti-Tank; Cobra bazooka trooper
- Heli-Viper - Cobra Battle Copter trooper
- Hydro-Viper^{a} - Cobra underwater elite trooper. Also known as the "demons of the deep"
- Ice-Viper^{a} - Cobra WOLF driver
- Jungle-Viper - Jungle assault trooper
- Kitchen Viper - Mentioned in the comics only; never actually seen
- Laser-Viper - Cobra laser trooper
- Medi-Viper - Medical trooper
- Mega-Viper - Mega-Monster trainer for the Bio-Vipers and the Monstro-Vipers
- Monstro-Viper - Savage Mega-Monster soldiers that were originally a team of Range-Vipers until Doctor Mindbender spliced their DNA with the DNA samples of bats, large Bigfoot-like creatures, gruesome grizzly bears, and rabid werewolves. This gave them a hybrid appearance with an armor-plated bionic left hand, protruding bones, and inner chambers that can produce regurgitating gut bombs.
- Motor-Viper - Cobra Stun pilot
- Nano-Viper - Cobra commandos that are merged with nanites on a bio-cellular lvel.
- Neo-Viper - Officer/infantryman
- Night-Viper - Cobra night fighter
- Ninja-Viper - Martial arts
- Nitro-Viper - Detonator driver
- Para-Viper - Cobra paratrooper
- Pit-Viper - Infiltration trooper
- Range-Viper - Cobra wilderness trooper
- Raptor-Viper -
- Red Ninja-Viper - Ninja warrior
- Rock-Viper - Cobra mountain trooper
- Sand-Viper - Desert infiltrator
- S.A.W. Viper - Semi-Automatic Weapons; Cobra heavy machine gunner
- Secto-Viper - Cobra Bugg driver
- Shadow-Viper - Counter intelligence
- Shock-Viper - Fire assault trooper
- Sludge-Viper - Cobra hazardous waste Viper
- Star-Viper - Cobra Stellar Stiletto pilot
- Strato-Viper - Cobra Night Raven S³P pilot
- Street-Viper - Urban combat trooper
- Sub-Viper - Underwater demolitions
- Swamp-Viper - Amphibious assault trooper
- Techno-Viper - Cobra battlefield technician
- Tele-Viper - Cobra communications
- Terra-Viper - Cobra Mole Pod pilot
- Toxo-Viper - Cobra hostile environment trooper
- Track-Viper - H.I.S.S. II driver
- Viper Guard - Cobra infantry
- Viper Pilot - Attack glider pilot
- Zombie-Viper - Cobra soldiers who were given the mysterious chemical substance Compound Z which transformed them into zombies.

^aThe Hydro-Vipers are actually part of the Cobra Eels and the Ice-Vipers are part of the Snow Serpents. How it is that these troops are "Vipers" and yet part of a non-Viper unit has never been explained by Hasbro.

=== Cobra Venom Troopers ===
The Cobra Venom Troopers (also called V-Troopers) are the results of Doctor Mindbender splicing some soldiers with the DNA of different animals and the Venom serum as part of an "Evilution" that was seen in the G.I. Joe: Valor vs. Venom line. They are led by Venomous Maximus and consist of:

- Electric E.E.L.s - A group of Cobra Moray Troops who were spliced with the DNA of electric eels, giving them electrical abilities and nictitating membranes that enable them to see through murky waters.
- Razor Troopers - A group of Cobra soldiers who were spliced with tiger DNA. Many of the Razor Troopers that were created do not remember their lives before their transformation. Razorclaw is their leader.
- Sand Scorpions - A group of Sand-Vipers who were spliced with scorpion DNA which gave them scales on the side of their body that enable them to breathe in the sand. They are led by Neurotoxin.
- Snow Wolves - A group of Cobra soldiers who were spliced with arctic wolf DNA where they travel in packs, possess super-strength, and can survive in cold temperatures.
- Swamp Rats - A group of Cobra soldiers and/or captive civilians that were spliced with marsh rat DNA where they can compress their bodies, see in the dark, move undetected, and have enhanced senses.

== Toys ==
The first figure to receive the designation "Viper" was the Viper Pilot (included with the Cobra Viper Attack Glider) in 1983. In 1985, Hasbro released the Tele-Viper (Cobra Communications) alongside other Cobra troops without the Viper designation, such as the Snow Serpent (Cobra Polar Assault) and the Eel (Cobra Frogman).

For the most part since then, Cobra troops, including drivers and pilots, have had the Viper code name attached to their area of expertise. The Cobra Soldier figure was the standard infantry trooper for Cobra, until 1986 when Hasbro released the Cobra Viper figure. The Viper's uniform featured a black flak jacket and a mirrored mask that resembled the battle mask worn by Cobra Commander. This figure was later released both as part of the Python Patrol and Sonic Fighters sub-lines of G.I. Joe in alternate colors, in 1989 and 1990 respectively.

In 1994 a new standard infantry Viper figure was released with a new look (purple armor with gas mask). In the G.I. Joe comic book series published by Marvel Comics, this version of the Viper was portrayed in a yellow-gold color. This new uniform did not last long and the more familiar Viper look later returned.

== Comics ==
=== Marvel Comics ===
Alley Vipers made their first appearance in issue #92 of the G.I. Joe series. They fight the G.I. Joe Team in the fictional city of Rio Lindo.

Several Cobra Vipers fight the Joe team in issue #113, in the fictional country of Benzheen, including Alley Vipers, Frag-Vipers and one Range-Viper. An Alley-Viper and Frag Viper send out a child into fire, this draws Sneak Peek, whom the Range-Viper kills. Other Joes raid the Cobra position, and the Alley-Viper is killed by Stalker.

Alley Vipers also fight Mutt and Spirit in Millville, a town Cobra was attempting to conquer, and appear in issue #145, where they fight G.I. Joe in Borovia.

=== Devil's Due ===
Vipers are seen working closely with Dreadnoks in Cobra's first push to revive in seven years. They then work closely with Iron Grenadiers. In a push to claim power in America, Cobra forces have used microscopic nanites to attack everything from communication systems to random citizens. Vipers and Cobra allies are presented as "saviors", but they are simply outright killers, for example they murder every member of a US National Guard relief convoy and distribute the supplies themselves. Vipers are part of the forces that march on the White House, which is defended by a multi-military effort, including several Joe soldiers. The Vipers kill multiple Joe rookies (collectively called "Greenshirts").

Several Alley-Vipers are slain while assisting the Dreadnoks in battling an out of control Battle Android Trooper. A single Alley-Viper is a part of the team combing Cobra Island for the infiltrator Barrel Roll. Several Alley-Vipers are part of the Cobra forces infiltrating the town of New Moon, Colorado, and are also used in a Cobra demonstration at Safeco Field in Seattle, Washington.

A Range-Viper code-named Skull Buster had made his home in the wilds of Namibia. When Shipwreck and Cover-Girl wash up on shore, he decides to kill them by faking their deaths from exposure; simple murder would cause too much of an investigation and disrupt his 'retirement' in the bush. Shipwreck stuns the man with scorpion venom and he is taken back to civilization, a fate he fears.

A particular Range-Viper code-named Body Bags is featured in a long running storyline in the America's Elite comics. He is one of many drawn from the ranks of Cobra soldiers to join The Plague, Cobra's latest answer to the elite of the G.I. Joe team.

Two Vipers becomes swept up in the events of the alternate universe series, G.I. Joe Vs. Transformers 2. As with other prominent Joe and Cobra characters, they agree to help rescue time-stranded Transformers. Failure means non-existence for all humans. One viper, Percy, goes with the Baroness, Beach-Head and Roadblock and Prohibition time and tries to assist there; though he is mostly derided for his efforts. Another assists three Joes in dinosaur times, turning a team of Autobots into the Dinobots.

== Animated series ==
=== Sunbow ===
The Cobra Troopers were the foot soldiers of Cobra in the Sunbow G.I. Joe: A Real American Hero series. They were voiced by several voice actors including Michael Bell, Arthur Burghardt, Peter Cullen, Pat Fraley, Buster Jones, Chris Latta, Bill Ratner, and Frank Welker.

The Cobra Vipers made their first animated appearance in "Arise Serpentor Arise!", which began the second season of the Sunbow produced series. They were used as common infantry for the remainder of the season, primarily replacing the blue and black masked Cobra soldiers of the first season (although those soldiers would still appear from time to time).

One Viper was voiced by Michael Bell. The Strato-Vipers that spoke were voiced by Jack Angel and Bill Ratner. The Tele-Vipers that spoke were voiced by Michael Bell, Chris Latta, and Frank Welker.

=== DiC ===
Range-Vipers as seen in the DiC G.I. Joe series.

The Cobra Troopers were also the foot soldiers in the DiC G.I. Joe: A Real American Hero series. Some of the Cobra Troopers loyal to Cobra Commander became soldiers in Cobra Commander's Python Patrol.

Following G.I. Joe: The Movie, in the DiC series, the main silver face-plated Cobra Vipers were replaced by various branches of Vipers such as Range-Vipers and Laser-Vipers. One Laser-Viper was voiced by Rick Poltaruk in the episode "Injustice and the Cobra Way".

The Alley Vipers played heavy into the plot of the first mini series from the DiC produced G.I. Joe series. G.I. Joe member Scoop is in training as a Crimson Guardsman and his closest friend in Cobra is an Alley Viper (voiced by Jim Byrnes). Scoop helps Cobra Commander take control back from Serpentor.

The Range-Vipers appeared in many episodes of the series, with one Range-Viper voiced by Mark Acheson. Two Range-Vipers appeared to have a vendetta against two G.I. Joe members Captain Grid-Iron and Ambush.

- The First Range-Viper appeared in "Pigskin Commandos" voiced by John Novah. He played quarterback for the pro football team, but hated Captain Grid-Iron who was the quarterback of the other team.
- The Second Ranger-Viper was a female named Ivy who appeared in "I Found You... Ivy" voiced by Lisa Corps. She used to be the friend of Ambush. Ivy was able to find all his hiding places until Ambush disappeared to join G.I. Joe and she vowed to kill him because he left without saying goodbye.

=== G.I. Joe: Sigma 6 ===
The Cobra Soldiers appear in G.I. Joe: Sigma 6.

=== G.I. Joe: Resolute ===
Cobra Soldiers appear in G.I. Joe: Resolute. Alley Vipers were updated for the Resolute series, and were in an all blue uniform.

=== G.I. Joe: Renegades ===
The Cobra Troopers in G.I. Joe: Renegades were depicted as the security guards for the facilities of Cobra Industries, such as Cobra Pharmaceuticals. They were voiced by Charlie Adler, Carlos Alazraqui, Michael Bell, Matthew Yang King, Andrew Kishino, Jason Marsden, Khary Payton, and Kevin Michael Richardson.

- The Bio Vipers are artificial creatures created by Doctor Mindbender from a blue liquid developed from experimentally altered plants. Originally, the Bio-Vipers lacked a nervous system and showed weaknesses to explosions and weed killer. However, Mindbender upgrades his creations with bio-dampening chips, which makes them smarter, but leaves them vulnerable to head shots.
  - A freak accident caused by Ripcord absorbing Bio-Viper matter into his body, created the potential to produce a human-Bio-Viper hybrid, with Cobra Commander seeing the potential of achieving immortality through it, upon being experimented on by Doctor Mindbender. To ensure control, Doctor Mindbender places a control chip on Ripcord, in order to turn him into a Bio-Viper on command. After the events of "Prodigal", Doctor Mindbender attempts to duplicate the DNA combination in "The Anomaly".
- During the events of "The Enemy of My Enemy", Doctor Mindbender is forced to work alongside Destro to combine their research to produce a combination of the Bio-Viper and M.A.R.S exo suits. Though earlier attempts failed, Doctor Mindbender devised a perfect fusion in the creation of the Mecha-Vipers.
- In "White Out," Shadow Vipers are black-colored versions of Bio Vipers, which were created to respond to Storm Shadow's mental commands, after Tomax and Xamot are used to establish a psychic link. The Shadow Vipers can materialize any part of them into ninja weapons, from katana-bladed arms to shurikens.
- A Techno-Viper is a specially created prototype Bio-Viper that was synthesized with nanotechnology, enabling it to absorb energy and manipulate any machine that it comes in contact with. But as the prototype Techno-Viper was uncontrollable, Cobra Industries had to put it into a container and keep it in cold temperatures.
  - During the events of "Shipwrecked", G.I. Joe found a container holding a prototype Techno-Viper in Canada, and later disposed of it. During the fight, Scarlett managed to set the Techno-Viper's destination to be Castle McCullen in Scotland. When learning of this, as he and Baroness interrogated the Joes, Destro suspects that Doctor Mindbender probably programmed the Techno-Viper to dispose of him.
- Though Mindbender's first attempt was seemingly a failure, the artificial human/Bio-Viper hybrid code named 14-C, managed to reform itself in the sewers in New York City. Its lurking in the sewers caused it to be referred to as a Sewer Viper. However, lacking the ability to assume human form, the Sewer Viper spirited a kid named Reggie into the sewers, while hurting a teenager named Ray for bullying him. News of this attracted Cobra Commander's attention, as he orders Doctor Mindbender to reclaim the Sewer Viper before it is caught by the authorities. At the same time, Duke, Roadblock, Tunnel Rat and Ripcord descend into the sewers to find Reggie and the Sewer Viper, revealed to be a good guy. Coming to the Joes' aid when captured by Mindbender, the Sewer Viper is revealed to lack a control chip while managing to remove the control chip from Ripcord. The Sewer Viper sacrifices itself, absorbing the explosion from the fail-safe that Mindbender installed, should his mental link with the Bio-Vipers' control chips be broken.

== Film ==
=== G.I. Joe: The Rise of Cobra ===
In the 2009 film G.I. Joe: The Rise of Cobra, Neo-Vipers were Cobra troopers who were enhanced with nanomites by The Doctor. These enhancements removed their self-preservation instincts and their sense of pain, and made them completely obedient to Cobra.

Cobra Vipers originally consisted mostly of mercenaries and criminals, however after the completion of all of Cobra's nano experimentation Neo-Vipers may have mostly consisted of kidnapped soldiers from around the world. Twenty mercenaries were selected for the painful series of injections, and the ones who did not die became super soldiers.

Each subject was injected with 1,000 CCs of nanomite solution, which left a small scar in the shape of a small cobra's head (all nano injected members of Cobra bear this mark, including Baroness, Zartan and much later Destro). After injection, specially designed nanomites both attack and rewire the subject's central nervous system, making the subject completely under the absolute control of their controller (the only exception to this was Zartan, who destroyed the neural controlling nanomites before he was injected).

== Video games ==
Some Vipers (such as Hydro-Vipers and Toxo-Vipers) appeared as regular enemies in the 1991 G.I. Joe video game for the Nintendo Entertainment System. Unusually for a non-individual, a Range-Viper appeared as a boss in the game.

Vipers also appeared in the game G.I. Joe: The Atlantis Factor.

Konami released an arcade-only G.I.Joe video game in 1992. Vipers were prominent enemies.

== Other works ==
- Cobra Vipers are an important plot element in the G.I. Joe novel Divide and Conquer.
- A Viper figure is briefly featured in the fiction novel 6 Sick Hipsters. In the story, the character Paul Achting spent four years collecting G.I. Joe figures to set up a battle scene between the Joes and Cobra. As he imagined the characters in his head, he observed the "core of Cobra Command" atop an oak toy chest, high above the thick shag carpet, while a nearby Viper, "one of many similarly dressed infantrymen, stood at the ready alongside a ragged copy of The Haunted Spy".
- Range-Viper is mentioned as one of many Cobra toys in a New Yorker article, page 142, printed on December 10, 1993.

== See also ==
- Cobra Command
- List of Cobra (G.I. Joe) characters
- List of G.I. Joe: A Real American Hero characters
