= Overkill (G.I. Joe) =

- G.I. Joe character
- First appearance: 1991
- Voiced by: Dale Wilson (DiC); Colin Murdock (Valor vs. Venom); Maddie Blaustein (Sigma 6)

In-universe information
- Affiliation: Cobra
- Secondary MOS: Unknown

Overkill is a fictional character from the G.I. Joe: A Real American Hero toyline from Hasbro, which has spawned comics and animated series. He first appeared in the 1989 G.I. Joe: A Real American Hero incarnation of the series. He also appears in G.I. Joe: Sigma 6.

== History ==
If the file cards that came with the Overkill action figures are to be believed, there are actually two different characters that owned the name Overkill. Both versions of the character are the leader of the B.A.T.s (short for Battle Android Troopers) that are controlled by the ruthless Cobra Organization.

The first Overkill was an experimental prototype of the B.A.T. with an advanced computer system and tactical logic programs but was considered by Cobra as too expensive to move to mass production. Despite being a soulless automaton, this Overkill is frequently referred to as a "he".

The second version appeared in 2003 as part of the G.I. Joe vs. Cobra series. This Overkill is a cyborg, which is half-man and half-machine. The file card spells his name as "Over Kill" rather than one word although news releases and the credits in Valor vs. Venom spelled it as "Overkill".

== Comics ==
=== Real American Hero – Devil's Due ===
Overkill made his first comic appearance in the Devil's Due G.I. Joe comics and was revealed to be Robert Skelton, the infamous SAW Viper from the Marvel Comics, who had killed a number of G.I. Joe members, including the Joes' medical officer Doc, the tank driver Heavy Metal, and the A.W.E. Striker driver Crankcase. Skelton is recruited by Serpentor and his new organization, the Coil. This is after ten men are sent to bring him in, he kills four.

He chooses the name Overkill, in reference to his impressive body count. He participates in the battle against the Joes and Cobra on Cobra Island and fights with General Hawk, and would have killed him had Kamakura not intervened and saved Hawk. Wounded, Overkill made his way onto a submarine with an escaping Cobra Commander and collapses, expressing the desire for power.

He was experimented on by Cobra scientists and given his own mobile targeting system and robotic implants (including cutting off his hand for an implant). He did battle with the Joes in Badhikstan and proved to be a formidable opponent before being defeated by Snake Eyes, he begged Snake Eyes to kill him, as he did not want to live like this, but Snake Eyes refused to and Overkill was last seen lying in the desert.

He was later a patient at a Cobra facility raided by Torpedo, Wet-Suit, and a group of Navy SEALs.

He was killed in the America's Elite series, during Tomax's raid on The Coffin, a prison run by G.I. Joe.

=== Sigma Six – Devils Due ===
The G.I. Joe: Sigma 6 version of Overkill also has a comic appearance, in GI Joe: Sigma 6 #3 also from Devil's Due. In the Sigma 6 comics, each issue featured one or two Joes paired up against a Cobra character. Overkill's Joe opponent was Tunnel Rat. The storyline has Tunnel Rat alone in the Arctic without his Sigma suit having to try and stop Overkill and his army of B.A.T.s. A preview of the comic is available at the Devil's Due minisite for the Sigma 6 comics.

== Toys ==
Overkill was first released as an action figure in 1991, as part of the Talking Battle Commanders line.

== Animated series ==
=== DiC cartoon ===
Overkill made his first animated appearance in the DiC-produced G.I. Joe animated series, voiced by Dale Wilson. Here he appeared to be fully robotic, and his appearance was that of his first action figure. His key episode in this series is "The Eliminator", in which he receives an upgrade via the Eliminator chip, which makes him stronger, faster and smarter. This puts him in Cobra Commander's good graces.

DiC appearances include:

- "The Eliminator"—Overkill gets an upgraded laser in his chest (Laser is included in his V1 action figure) and becomes 'The Eliminator'.
- "The Sword"—where he's sent by Cobra Commander to retrieve the Sword of Destiny from Night Creeper Leader (who, naturally enough, wants it for himself).
- "El Dorado: The Lost City of Gold"—where he's possessed by the spirit of Commander Fernando Luiz Jorge Pizarro, cousin to the explorer Francisco Pizarro.
- "Kindergarten Commandos"—Overkill shows up to help Cobra Commander fight off the forces of six small children and the G.I. Joe Mercer. His appearance in this episode is relatively minor.
- "Keyboard Warriors"—Another minor appearance.

=== Valor vs. Venom ===
Overkill returned in the CGI movie G.I. Joe: Valor vs. Venom by Reel FX, now clearly a half-human and half-machine cyborg version, with a variety of robotic appendages and a tendency to repeat the end of his sentences in a manic tone of voice. He serves Cobra as Doctor Mindbender's lab assistant and BAT commander. Overkill looks down upon "organics", and believes he and his BATs are better candidates to rule the world. In a series of fortuitous circumstances, he makes an alliance with "Venomous Maximus", a mutated and brainwashed General Hawk. Together, they attempted to remove Cobra Commander from power, and control Cobra themselves. The Joes are able to turn Maximus back into Hawk, and the Cobra base begins to explode around Overkill, who IS seemingly crushed in the ensuing explosion. However, following the credits, Overkill's robotic hand rises up on the screen. This has been theorized as a preview of the abandoned Robot Revolution line rumored to be following Valor vs. Venom.

=== Sigma 6 ===
Overkill returns in G.I. Joe: Sigma 6, he is now inside a rejuvenation tank and wearing new armor, appearing far more robotic than when he last appeared. He is also revamped from a monotonous automaton lab assistant to Cobra's chief scientist. He is smarter and more devious, with a free will of his own.

Overkill is still attempting to overthrow Cobra Commander with his new B.A.T.s, this time in secret, and has a new more powerful BAT called Overlord Vector, which he uses to kidnap General Hawk's son, Scott. Overkill believed Scott had hacked into Cobra's computers, and possessed a formula which would allow his B.A.T.s to evolve as they fought. His kidnapping of Scott ultimately led the Joes to Cobra's underwater headquarters. However, when Overkill scanned Scott's mind, he found that his discovery was just pure dumb luck. Overkill fled as Snake Eyes battled his creation, Overlord Vector. Overkill managed to escape, and still resides in his tank inside his lab in the underground Cobra base, now planning to get hold of the power stones sought by the Joes and Cobra, to launch his Robot Revolution. With the foiling of Cobra's power stones plot, Overkill has apparently given up that quest.

During the second season of the cartoon, Overkill is finally able to create himself a body, and is removed from his healing tank.

== Video game ==
Overkill appeared as a boss in 1992's G.I. Joe: The Atlantis Factor for the Nintendo Entertainment System.
