= Man vs. Technology =

"Man vs technology" is a type of conflict in fiction, of which The Terminator and The Matrix are popular examples.
