= Flint (G.I. Joe) =

Fictional character from the G.I. Joe franchise

- G.I. Joe character
- First appearance: 1984
- Voiced by: Bill Ratner (Sunbow/Marvel/Robot Chicken); Michael Donovan (DiC); Charlie Adler (Resolute); Johnny Messner (Renegades); Seth Green (Robot Chicken)

In-universe information
- Affiliation: G.I. Joe
- Specialty: Warrant Officer; Desert Paratrooper (1994)
- File name: Faireborn, Dashiell R.
- Birth place: Wichita, Kansas
- SN: 307-62-4107 (1985); 307-6290-DF07 (1994); 307-62-FD87 (2002)
- Rank: E-6 (Staff Sergeant) (listed in error 1985 & 2009); CW-3 (Chief Warrant Officer 3) (1988); CW-2 (Chief Warrant Officer 2) (1991); CW-4 (Chief Warrant Officer 4) (Comic book series); O-5 (Colonel) (Action Force version); O-2 (First Lieutenant) (Renegades)
- Primary MOS: Infantry (1985) Military Tactician; Paratrooper Operations (1994 only); L.A.V. Operator (2001 only)
- Secondary MOS: Helicopter Pilot (1985); Demolitions (1988 only); Commando (1994 only); Desert Paratrooper (2001 only); Rotary Wing Aircraft Pilot (2001)
- Subgroups: Tiger Force, Eco-Warriors, Night Force

Flint is a fictional character from the G.I. Joe: A Real American Hero series. He was originally created as a character for the Sunbow G.I. Joe animated series in 1984, and later introduced into the comic book and produced as an action figure in 1985. He is portrayed by D.J. Cotrona in the 2013 film G.I. Joe: Retaliation.

== Profile ==
Flint is the Chief Warrant Officer for the G.I. Joe Team. His real name is Dashiell R. Faireborn, and he was born in Wichita, Kansas. He is a Rhodes Scholar and holds a degree in English literature. He graduated with top honors from Airborne School, Ranger School, Special Forces School and Flight Warrant Officers School. As a master tactician, he also oversaw several strategically important rescue missions. Because of his credentials, Duke brought him in to the G.I. Joe Team. Flint is often regarded as the G.I. Joe team's "rugged Warrant Officer."

Flint has earned a reputation as an arrogant egotist, but Flint's skills usually back up his inflated ego. This initially brought him into frequent conflict with teammate Lady Jaye, and the two fought attraction to each other for years, but eventually gave in and expressed their feelings for each other. The two shared a tenuous relationship until G.I. Joe was disbanded, at which time Flint decided to remain active in the military, while Lady Jaye went into semi-retirement. When the team was reinstated, Flint chose to accept a position as the team's primary tactical planner rather than return as a field commander.

Flint's 1986 action figure card describes him as a "Warrant Officer" but his character profile states his grade as E-6 for his original release. This was due to the error by an editor, and not the original author of the file card, Larry Hama. All subsequent releases give him a rank of Chief Warrant Officer Two, pay grade WO-2.

In the UK Action Force comics and toys, Flint's real name was David R. Faireborn and his file card stated that he hailed from Lincoln, England.

== Toys ==
Flint was first released as part of series 4 in 1985. Common elements of many of his appearances are his beret and his choice of a shotgun for a weapon. The figure was repainted and released as part of the Tiger Force line in 1988.

In 1991, as part of the Eco-Warriors line, Flint's body was molded from color changing plastic, which would change to show sludge damage when hit with cold water.

A new version of Flint was released in 1994, as part of the Battle Corps line.

A version of Flint with no accessories came with the Built to Rule Ground Striker in 2004. The forearms and the calves of the figure sported places where blocks could be attached.

Flint never appeared in the G.I. Joe: Sigma 6 TV series, though a Sigma 6 action figure was released near the end of the line.

Flint was released in 2007 with the first wave of single packs, celebrating the 25th Anniversary of G.I. Joe: A Real American Hero. In 2008, he was released disguised as a Cobra Officer with an interchangeable masked head.

Flint was also released as part of the Hall of Heroes series. The figure came packaged on a blister card and in a special collectors' box. The first wave was released in April 2009.

Flint was released in the Classified series in 2020.

== Comics ==
=== Marvel Comics ===
In the Marvel Comics G.I. Joe series, he first appeared in issue #37. He helps save the lives of Ripcord, Gung-Ho and Blowtorch.

Flint is a featured character in the Special Missions back-up story for issue #50. Along with Beach-Head and Lady Jaye, he successfully infiltrates a terrorist held airplane. All of the adversaries are neutralized.

Flint takes some private time to try and romance Lady Jaye. He thinks she is accepting his advances when she pulls him into some bushes. She is hiding from Cobra Eels, underwater troopers who are providing backup support for a Cobra invasion of Joe Headquarters. Flint takes on all of the Cobra soldiers by himself, allowing Lady Jaye to warn the others. There are tears in her eyes as she runs off. Flint escapes an EEL executioner and is seen later, injured and bleeding but still mobile.

Flint, Lady Jaye, Scarlett and Snake Eyes take a vacation in the island country of Grenada. Flint witnesses what seems to be the death of the latter two; they had actually faked an explosion so as to go rescue three Joes the USA had written off.

Flint's relationship with Lady Jaye hits an important point in issue #67. Scarlett and Snake Eyes come back with the Joes. Flint is angry they had not been let in on things. Lady Jaye punches Flint and lectures him that the other two did what they did because they cared. Flint replies "Like you do?" Scarlett then escorts Snake Eyes away from Flint and Lady Jaye hugging.

Flint briefly leads the Joe sub-team, the "Eco-Warriors". With Ozone and Clean-Sweep, he confronts the Cobra agent Cesspool, who is causing a pollution disaster from an abandoned oil platform.

Flint also had his more brutal side, as shown in a mission in war-torn Wolkekuckuckland. He and Lady Jaye stumble upon two Cobra soldiers. Flint is forced to kill his opponent. The other man, a Cobra Viper, surrenders to Lady Jaye. Flint says they cannot take prisoners, and offers to kill the man if she is not able to do it. In the end, the prisoner lived. The two soldiers also have to deal with Wolkekuckuckland's leader and the man's traitorous assistant.

=== Devil's Due Publishing ===
==== Reinstatement ====
When G.I. Joe disbands, Flint and Lady Jaye marry. When G.I. Joe is reformed, they both return to the team, just as Flint is starting to write a book on his experiences in G.I. Joe. Flint resumes his duties as the team's primary tactician, while Lady Jaye eventually becomes the Joes' Head of Intelligence and a field commander. Many of their teammates comment that Flint's marriage to Lady Jaye seems to have a positive effect on him, causing him to mellow out a great deal.

Flint's book, Fight For Freedom, becomes popular, and he goes on a book tour for it. Flint and the Baroness are both kidnapped by the same organization in Czechoslovakia. Destro and Duke arrange for G.I. Joe, Cobra and the Oktober Guard to team up, in order to rescue them. Despite being betrayed by Lt. Gorky, Flint and the Baroness are rescued, and Daina joins the G.I. Joe team after Lt. Gorky is killed.

Lady Jaye is murdered by Red Shadows member Dela Eden in front of Flint, causing him to go up against the Red Shadows alone. Flint is captured, but uses a tracker to lead G.I. Joe to the Red Shadows headquarters. Flint is able to confront and defeat Dela Eden, yet refuses to kill Dela, even though he has the opportunity.

==== America’s Elite ====
When G.I. Joe is reformed with a smaller roster and covert status, Flint is called back to active duty. However, the death of Lady Jaye had caused him to seemingly become a new person. His face now bears scars possibly due to his more aggressive approach in battle. The charismatic, well-spoken and confident to the point of arrogance Warrant Officer, was replaced by a sullen and brooding man who rarely speaks (when he does, it is usually to suggest maximum force against any size threat), and trains to become a better warrior at the cost of his humanity.

Flint would eventually walk out of the team to pursue his vendetta against the Shadows. While tracking Red Shadows' leader Wilder Vaughn, Flint spots the Baroness with Vaughn, and torn between duty and revenge, Flint chose to go after the Baroness. Spirit and Snake Eyes track Flint to the Baroness' location, where the three of them are attacked by Black Out. Flint rejoins the team, and during "World War III" he leads a team to Dagestan, and captures Cobra Mortal and Ghost Bear. This entire comic series was later declared non-canonical by Hasbro when the license for the comics was transferred to IDW.

== Animated series ==
=== Sunbow series ===
Flint's first animated appearance was in the second G.I. Joe miniseries, The Revenge of Cobra, in which he was presented as the second in command, filling in for Duke as G.I. Joe team leader, after Duke is captured by Cobra. Flint then became a recurring character throughout the series, often alternating in the commanding officer role with Duke in the first season. When General Hawk was introduced, Duke was made second in command while Flint became third in the chain. Flint's romance with Lady Jaye was a common piece of the storyline throughout the show, and one of the few things the cartoon had in common with the comic book.

Some of Flint's major appearances include "The Gamesmaster", in which he is kidnapped along with Lady Jaye, Baroness and Cobra Commander by a mentally ill entrepreneur; "Eau de Cobra", in which he is on a mission with Lady Jaye to prevent Cobra from gaining control of the largest shipping fleet in the world and is briefly seduced by the Baroness with a special perfume; "Primordial Plot", in which he, Gung-Ho and Scarlett stop Cobra from cloning dinosaurs for an army; and "The Spy Who Rooked Me", in which he is one of the Joes working with a British secret agent to deliver a box containing a powerful nerve gas, which Cobra attempts to possess, to a chemical weapons arsenal.

Flint's most prominent role was in "Flint's Vacation". In the episode, he goes a seaside town to visit his cousin, only to discover that Cobra has hypnotized the population into slave labor at a secret underwater base. Flint is soon captured and falls victim to the brainwashing as well, through television. The Joes later enter the Cobra base to rescue the people. Lady Jaye confronts Flint in an airlock in the base. Flint locks the door to the city and tries to open the sea door, but returns to a normal mental state when Breaker disables the subliminal transmissions.

Flint was the only G.I. Joe character to have three PSA appearances. Flint was voiced by Bill Ratner.

==== G.I. Joe: The Movie ====
In G.I. Joe: The Movie, Flint appears in the movie as leader of the rescue team that is searching for Roadblock. Like many of the characters from the previous seasons, he does not have a major part in the movie, but is seen throughout most of the movie.

=== DiC series ===
Flint makes a reappearance later in the second season of the DiC cartoon, as the leader of the "Eco-Warriors". He fights with his team to stop Cesspool from destroying the world with toxic waste. As with many characters from the Sunbow era, Flint's personality was changed. The series didn't refer to his relationship with Lady Jaye (who appeared in the first season, paired up with Captain Grid-Iron). He was voiced by Michael Donovan.

=== Transformers ===
Flint also has a connection to the Transformers series. Fans speculated for two decades that the character Marissa Faireborn in Transformers is his daughter, since they both share the same last name. In "The Killing Jar", she encounters an illusory version of her father, who was voiced by Bill Ratner, the same actor as Flint in the G.I. Joe series. The writers of both shows remained coy whether Marissa Faireborn was actually Flint and Lady Jaye's daughter or not. However, cast notes for "The Killing Jar" refer to Marissa's father as being "a 60-year-old Flint". The mystery was finally solved on November 7, 2006, with the 20th anniversary DVD release of The Transformers: The Movie. On an interview on the DVD, Flint Dille, story editor for Transformers, confirmed that Marissa Faireborn is indeed Flint and Lady Jaye's daughter.

=== Spy Troops and Valor vs. Venom ===
Flint appeared in the direct-to-video CGI animated movies G.I. Joe: Spy Troops and G.I. Joe: Valor vs. Venom, voiced by Brian Dobson. He had a minor role in Valor vs Venom, working on a remote station in the jungle, with Gung-Ho, Beach Head and Tunnel Rat under his command.

=== G.I. Joe: Resolute ===
In G.I. Joe: Resolute, Flint is second-in-command during the HAARP crisis. When Duke is personally seeing to the Siberian strike, Flint takes command on the USS Flagg, overseeing the gathering of information by the support staff and the deployment of Joe squads to HAARP and a stratalite formation. When Cobra's secondary HAARP targets the USS Flagg, Flint leads the evacuation and, on board a mobile HQ in a Globemaster, hands command back to the returned Duke. He then joins in the raid on Cobra's base at Springfield.

=== G.I. Joe: Renegades ===
In G.I. Joe: Renegades, Flint is a commissioned officer (First Lieutenant) in Army Intelligence rather than a warrant officer (although the "file-card" image in the show's title credits still lists him as a warrant officer). He is also opposed to the Renegades and is assigned to arrest them by General Abernathy following the destruction of Cobra Pharmaceuticals. He uses Lady Jaye as his contact to capture the Renegades, but is unaware that she is actually supporting Duke against orders and against Flint. He is aware she's sympathetic to Duke, however, and believed this would make her more willing to bring him in safely (in the episode "The Descent"). In describing his character, Duke refers to Flint as a "blowhard", but one who is "clean" (episode 12, "Homecoming, Part 2").

In a flashback as seen in the two-part episode "Homecoming", Flint was a football player who led his team to victory with a play that ended up breaking Duke's leg. Flint was happy to rub this in until he realized how serious the damage had been and that this ruined Duke's chance to get a football scholarship to college. To help him out, Flint got him a job in the army. In a later encounter, after seeing Duke save another soldier's life, he pushed to get the man a medal. Despite his overbearing and arrogant manner, Flint in "Homecoming, Part 2" claims that he is Duke's friend and has only ever tried to help him. When the Renegades are briefly in custody in "Homecoming", Flint interrogates Duke: he doesn't believe the truth about Cobra Industries but as he knows Duke is a good man, Flint believes he was coerced into destroying a Cobra factory on behalf of unknown backers who will now want to silence him. Because of this belief, Flint has the Renegades' families under armed protection so they can't be targeted. When the Baroness attacks the prison transport train, he reluctantly recruits the Joes to fight her off; when they escape afterwards, he deliberately doesn't shoot Duke when he has a clear shot.

While Flint is an antagonist, he is still shown to be one of the good guys. In "Busted", Flint launched a raid on a prison where the prison's corrupt warden was holding illegal fights between the inmates. Before he raided, he had the guard at the gate tell the warden to "surrender his fugitives and himself" or they will be coming in by force. When the warden told the guard that contacted him to retaliate by attacking Flint's group, Flint started the raid.

In "Knockoffs", he showed distrust of and distaste for Baroness' Cobra troopers at the time when he and Lady Jaye were using Zartan to track the Joes. When Zartan escaped with the Chameleon Mold meant for Cobra Commander, Baroness stated to Flint that she thought he was with the Joes. Flint had to call in Wild Bill to help them track down Zartan.

In "Prodigal", the Joes had to arrange for Ripcord (who was discovered to have been turned into a Human/Bio-Viper Hybrid) to surrender to Flint's group. Flint was surprised at the fact that Ripcord had survived the explosion of Cobra Pharmaceuticals. When a Cobra Drone got near the helicopter that Ripcord was one, Ripcord ended up turning into his Human/Bio-Viper form and jumped out knocking out Flint in the process. Due to Flint being knocked out, Lady Jaye had to call off the pursuit.

In "Cousins", Flint and Lady Jaye bring in Heavy Duty to track down Roadblock.

== Live action film ==
Flint
- G.I. Joe character
- First appearance: 2013
- Portrayed by: D.J. Cotrona

In-universe information
- Affiliation: G.I. Joe
- File name: Faireborn, Dashiell R.
- Birth place: Wichita, Kansas
- Rank: E-5 (Sergeant)
- Primary MOS: Agility Expert, Freerunning
- Series: G.I. Joe: Retaliation

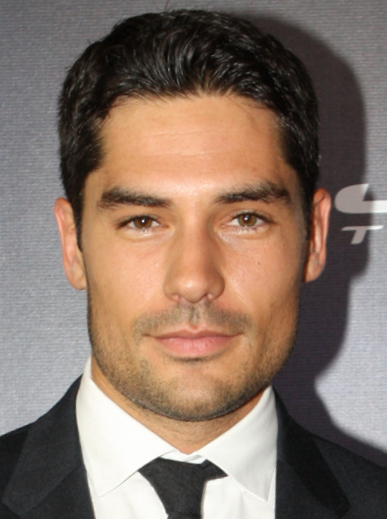
D.J. Cotrona portrays Flint in G.I. Joe: Retaliation

D.J. Cotrona portrays Flint in G.I. Joe: Retaliation, the sequel to G.I. Joe: The Rise of Cobra.

In the film, Flint is a rookie to Duke's Joe unit, which goes to Pakistan to recover a nuclear warhead. The majority of the unit is subsequently eliminated in a military air strike, with the only survivors being Flint, Roadblock (Dwayne Johnson), and Lady Jaye (Adrianne Palicki). The Joes go to Roadblock's hometown and set up a base in a former community center, also contacting the original Joe, General Joseph Colton (Bruce Willis), who helps them stop Cobra. The Joes stop Cobra's plot at the U.N. meeting, and are later rewarded for their actions.

== Video games ==
Flint appears as one of the characters in the first Action Force video game.

== Other media ==
- Bill Ratner reprises his role of Flint in the Family Guy episode "North by North Quahog." Flint appears in a parody of the "Knowing is half the battle" public service announcements that were common after the end of many G.I. Joe episodes. He appears out of a bathroom stall in Chris Griffin's school to talk about the downsides to abusing alcohol. He was never mentioned by name.
- Flint appears in the Robot Chicken episode "Toyz in the Hood." He is shown carpooling with He-Man, Lion-O, and Superman. Bill Ratner reprises his role of Flint in the episode "Day at the Circus". Flint later makes a cameo in the episode "More Blood, More Chocolate" where he and the other Joes storm Cobra Command and plant an American Flag in Cobra Commander's butt. In "PS: Yes In That Way", Flint was among the G.I. Joe members mocking their newest member Calvin AKA Doctor Fumbles. He is untimely sniped by Fumbles in the throat when the Joe Team were ambushed only leaving Duke alive. In "The Ramblings of Maurice", Flint was present at Junkyard's funeral.
- In the webcomic Least I Could Do written by Ryan Sohmer, the main character, Rayne Summers, has once fallen asleep while playing with G.I. Joe action figures and played the role of Flint in a hallucinated battle between him and Cobra forces. During his hallucination, Summers is referred to by the other G.I. Joe soldiers as "Flint".
- Pages 148-150 of the non-fiction e-book Diary of an American Boy has one young child's re-imagining of Flint's romance with Lady Jaye. Diary of an American Boy: A Poet, Athlete, Stud, and a Liar by Charles Pratt.
- Bill Ratner reprises his role of Flint in the Community episode "G.I. Jeff".
