= G.I. Joe: Valor vs. Venom =

- Directed by: Dale Carman
- Written by: Garfield Reeves-Stevens; Judith Reeves-Stevens
- Produced by: Daley Miller; Steve Drucker
- Starring: John Payne; Lisa Ann Beley; Michael Dobson; Scott McNeil
- Music by: John Hunter
- Production companies: Reel FX Creative Studios; Hasbro
- Distributed by: Paramount Home Entertainment
- Release date: September 14, 2004
- Running time: 77 minutes
- Country: United States
- Language: English

G.I. Joe: Valor vs. Venom is a 2004 American animated military science fiction action film. The film is a sequel to G.I. Joe: Spy Troops (2003). It was released in 2004 by Reel FX Creative Studios and distributed by Paramount Home Entertainment. Like Spy Troops, the film was written around the theme of the toys released that year. In this case, it was Valor vs. Venom which introduced a new villain group, Cobra’s V-Troops. most of the voice actors reprised their roles, with new additions including Kevan Ohtsji as Kamakura and Slice, Brian Drummond as Slash and The President, Andy Toth as Dusty (replacing Alessandro Juliani), Venus Terzo as Jinx, Frank Salazar as Venomous Maximus, Trevor Devall as Wild Weasel and Lee Tockar as Beach Head (replacing Matt Hill). The film also aired on November 27, 2004 on Cartoon Network's Toonami block.

== Plot ==
Some time after Spy Troops, Cobra sends drones to the local zoo to take DNA from the alpha predators. G.I. Joe is called in by the zoo's vet, finding a tranquilizer dart left behind. Snake Eyes grants his students Kamakara and Jinx swords for completing their training; though Kamakara's blade refuses to be drawn unless he is in the right mindset. At the same time the Joe's senior member, General Hawk is captured by Destro and the Baroness. At Cobra's arctic base, Doctor Mindbender reveals Cobra Commander's latest scheme: mutate (or "Venomize") humans into animalistic brainwashed troopers. But they need a good general; hence Hawk's abduction for the full Venomization process.

The Joes track down the base, just as Cobra Commander blasts Hawk with a DNA mixture; however it fails, due to the full process being incomplete. Cyborg commander of the B.A.T.s, Overkill, uses a device to scrabble Hawk's DNA with the DNA samples of different apex predators, causing him to transform into "Venomous Maximus"; suppressing Hawk's memory. The Joes retreat after failing to bring Hawk back to his senses. However, Maximus is proving resistant to Cobra Commander's mind control scepter; a side-effect Mindbender warned could happen if too much alpha animal DNA was used.

Cobra relocates to a missile launching facility recently stolen from the Joe's by Slash and Slice's army of B.A.T.s and Venoms. Maximus strikes a partnership with Overkill, promising to reward him with equality and respect when he takes over Cobra. The Joes launch an attack to take back the base, having developed an antidote to cure the Venoms; this forces Maximus to mutiny earlier. Mindbender, not wanting the world to devolve under Maximus's animalistic rule, helps the Joes trap him in a magnetic field to assist the antidote in curing him. It doesn't work, until Cobra Commander attempts to kill Maximus and Duke with a missile.

The impact against the magnetic field sends the missile backwards into the base; at the same time curing Hawk. To Cobra Commander's exasperation, this starts a loop of missiles backfiring into the base, which buries Overkill and allows Mindbender and the rest of Cobra to escape. Captured by the Joes, Cobra Commander attempts to bribe his way out of custody, only to be shot down by the annoyed heroes.

== Cast ==
Actor	Role
John Payne	Duke
Michael Dobson	Cobra Commander
Mark Hildreth	Hi-Tech
Joseph May	Dr. Link Talbot
Venus Terzo	Jinx
Kevan Ohtsji	Kamakura, Slice
Jim Foronda	Doctor Mindbender
Andy Toth	Dusty
Doron Bell Jr.	Tunnel Rat
Brian Dobson	Flint
Frank Salazar	Venomous Maximus
Scott McNeil	Destro, Gung-Ho
Lisa Ann Beley	Scarlett
Phil Hayes	Hawk, Torpedo, Wet Suit
Blu Mankuma	Heavy Duty
Colin Murdock	Overkill
Lee Tockar	Shipwreck, Beach Head
Teryl Rothery	Baroness
Ty Olsson	Storm Shadow
Peter Kelamis	Polly
Brian Drummond	Slash, President
Don S. Davis	Wild Bill
Louis Chirillo	Frostbite
Alistair Abell	Ace
Trevor Devall	Wild Weasel

== Toys ==
Hasbro also released a Valor vs. Venom toyline in 2004, to correspond with the characters from the movie. A second wave of Valor vs. Venom figures was released in 2005.

The following 3 3/4 inch collection was to be called G.I. Joe: Robot Revolution, and would have featured the Joes against Cobra robots and cyborgs. That toyline would likely have had its own movie, as a sequel to Valor vs. Venom, but the toyline was replaced by the 8-inch G.I. Joe: Sigma 6 toyline in 2006. However, Sigma 6 also deals with cybernetically-enhanced Cobras.
