= Hawk (G.I. Joe) =

Fictional character from the G.I. Joe franchise

- G.I. Joe character
- Packaging artwork for Hawk's; 1986 action figure
- First appearance: G.I. Joe: A Real American Hero issue #1 (June 1982)
- Voiced by: Ed Gilbert (Sunbow and DiC's Season One); David Kaye (DiC's Season Two and Sgt. Savage and His Screaming Eagles); Phil Hayes (Spy Troops and Valor vs. Venom); Anthony Salerno (Sigma Six); Lee Majors (Renegades)

In-universe information
- Affiliation: G.I. Joe
- Specialty: Missile Commander (1982); G.I. Joe Commander (1986); Armor-Tech Commander (1993)
- File name: Abernathy, Clayton M.
- Birth place: Denver, Colorado
- SN: RA212754036 (1982); 142-27-CM46 (2004)
- Rank: O-6 (Colonel) (1982); O-7 (Brigadier General) (1986); O-8 (Major General) (1992); O-9 (Lieutenant General) (Devil's Due comics)
- Primary MOS: Artillery (1982); Strategic Command Operations (1993); Ranger (2002)
- Secondary MOS: Radar (1982); Armor-Bot Commander (1993); Military Intelligence (2002)
- Subgroups: Star Brigade

Hawk is a fictional character from the G.I. Joe: A Real American Hero media franchise. He is one of the original members of the G.I. Joe Team, and debuted in 1982 as a Missile Commander, but was later promoted to full commander of the team. Hawk is portrayed by Dennis Quaid in the 2009 live-action film G.I. Joe: The Rise of Cobra.

== Profile ==
Hawk's real name is Clayton M. Abernathy, and he was born in Denver, Colorado. He comes from a wealthy family, whose influence enabled him to enroll in West Point. He graduated at the top of his class. He also graduated from Advanced Infantry Training and Covert Ops School, and served on the fictional North Atlantic Range Command and USA ENG COM and EVR Missile Radar Training. Hawk is a qualified expert in the use of the M16 rifle and M-1911A1 automatic pistol.

Hawk is the original field commander of the G.I. Joe Team. His primary military specialty is strategic command operations and his secondary military specialties are ranger, artillery, intelligence and radar. His original rank was that of colonel. He was later promoted to brigadier general and then major general. As a colonel, Hawk served under General Lawrence Flagg, and was responsible for recruiting most of the team's early members. After General Flagg was killed in action and his successor, General Austin, retired from active duty, Hawk assumed full command of the G.I. Joe team.

As the conflict between G.I. Joe and Cobra became known in the United States and abroad, Hawk was the public face of the G.I. Joe team. He was also instrumental in the reinstatement of the G.I. Joe team after it was temporarily disbanded. This was due to his involvement with "The Jugglers", a top-secret group of generals who had frequently interfered with the team's operations. Hawk was able to undermine corruption from within by keeping tabs on them, and blackmailed them into immediately reinstating the team, once evidence was presented that Cobra was again operating on domestic soil. However, he decides to take on more of an advisory role as commander in chief, letting field command duties fall to Duke.

== Toys ==
Hawk was part of the first wave of action figures that were released in 1982, packaged with the Mobile Missile System playset. Although he held the rank of colonel and his file card has flattering statements about his leadership abilities, his job description was "Missile Commander", though in the Marvel Comics G.I. Joe series he was G.I. Joe team's field commander. All of the original sixteen figures from 1982 were released with "straight arms". The same figure was re-released in 1983 with a "swivel-arm battle grip", which made it easier for figures to hold their rifles and accessories.

In 1986, Hasbro released a new Hawk action figure who carried the rank of brigadier general. Concurrent with that, he became overall commander in both the comics and the Sunbow cartoon following the death of General Flagg. A new action figure was released in 1991, with the name changed from "Hawk" to "General Hawk". General Hawk was also released in 1991 as part of the "Talking Battle Commanders" line. In 1993, two new versions of General Hawk were released as part of the Star Brigade line.

When Hasbro revived the G.I. Joe: A Real American Hero line in 2000, they failed to renew their trademark claim to the name "Hawk", and could no longer release the character with that name attached. Therefore, he was released as "General Tomahawk", with the rank of major general. His name was changed again in 2004 to "General Abernathy", and then to "G.I. Joe Hawk" in 2008.

In 2009, to coincide with the launch of the movie G.I. Joe: The Rise of Cobra, Hasbro released three figures based on the movie character, with the name General Clayton "Hawk" Abernathy. The first was released with the Pit Mobile Headquarters, the second as a stand-alone figure, and the third as a Wal-Mart exclusive with the Laser Artillery Weapon. A version of Hawk was also released as part of "The Pursuit of Cobra" line in 2011, with a non-actor based head.

== Comics ==
=== Marvel Comics ===
Hawk first appears in the Marvel Comics series G.I. Joe: A Real American Hero #1. He serves as a colonel and the field commander of the G.I. Joe team under General Lawrence Flagg. It is shown that prior to the creation of G.I. Joe, Hawk was a lieutenant colonel commanding security forces, and was responsible for recruiting many of the original members of the team, including Stalker and Snake Eyes. Hawk quickly gains the respect of his soldiers and participates in a number of early missions. In one mission, he and Grunt go undercover to infiltrate an illegal militia run by a man named Vance Wingfield. During a battle in the streets of Washington D.C., Hawk is shot point-blank in the back by Cobra Commander, but recovers due to a bulletproof vest.

After the death of General Flagg, Hawk assumes command of the G.I. Joe team, but is still advised by General Austin. Operations at The Pit keep him busy, so Hawk relegates field command to Duke. When General Austin later suffers a heart attack, he retires and promotes Hawk to Brigadier General, giving him command of the entire G.I. Joe operation. After the G.I. Joe team invades the Cobra-controlled town of Springfield and has nothing to show for it, the team is in danger of being shut down. Hawk accepts full responsibility, and meets with three high-ranking military officers deep in the otherwise empty Pit, when the facility is attacked by Cobra's Battle Android Troopers. Two of the generals are killed, but the survivor General Hollingsworth reactivates the team, and puts Hawk back in command.

Hawk leads the team through the first Cobra civil war, which takes place on Cobra Island. During the conflict, he is involved in a fist-fight with the Dreadnok Buzzer atop the Thunder Machine. Upon returning from this mission, General Hawk and General Hollingsworth are arrested, under claims that the Joes acted without authorization. Roadblock organizes a rescue mission, with the help of the Joes who had not been arrested. Destro, who was monitoring the situation, finds the lack of respect for his enemy intolerable. He shows up at the rescue, and neutralizes the entire situation by proving Hawk's innocence on live television.

In the Battle of Benzheen, Hawk leads nearly the entire team into battle, and deals with political corruption when the operation ends thanks to a deal their "allies" make with Cobra Commander. As a result, many Joes are executed while in Cobra custody. During a mission into Trans-Carpathia, Hawk nearly dies before other members of the Joe team can rescue him. He later personally leads missions into the Cobra-controlled town of Millville, and later returns to fight Cobra in Eastern Europe. Hawk's final duty as G.I. Joe commander is to preside over the closing ceremony of The Pit, after the G.I. Joe team was decommissioned at the cancellation of the series.

=== Devil's Due Publishing ===
When Cobra returns a few years later in the Devils Due series, Hawk lobbies for the re-instatement of the G.I. Joe team. He is successful, and publicly announces the reinstatement of the G.I. Joe team, which is seen by members of Cobra. However, he does not re-assume full command, passing on leadership responsibility to Duke, while he takes on more of an advisory role. This is so he can devote time to keeping an eye on the Jugglers, a cabal of generals with an agenda of their own. He also mentions that several younger officers have nicknamed him "General Tomahawk". When Scarlett and Snake Eyes are taken prisoner by Destro, Hawk sends Kamakura and Spirit to find Cobra Commander's son Billy, who helps them rescue Scarlett and Snake Eyes.

Hawk using a wheelchair. From the cover of G.I. Joe: A Real American Hero Vol. 2 #34

Cobra Commander returns, accompanied by Storm Shadow, and creates plans to get revenge on both Destro and Hawk. Storm Shadow tries to assassinate Hawk, but is confronted by Snake Eyes before escaping. Destro is later double-crossed by the president of Sierra Gordo, and arrested by Duke. Destro makes a deal to deliver Cobra Commander in exchange for his freedom. The Joes confront Cobra, and Destro is traded for Cobra Commander, but during the conflict the Commander shoots Hawk in the back, and in turn is shot from behind by the Baroness.

Hawk survives, but lapses into a coma. General Joseph Colton returns to fill in for Hawk as commander of the team. While in a coma, Hawk has a dream that he was finally retiring and settling down with his wife Carolee, who in reality was long dead. He then visits Cobra Commander in prison, and the two argue before Cobra Commander moves from the shadows to reveal Hawk's face. When Hawk wakes up, he learns that he has an unretractable bullet lodged in his spine, which has left him paralyzed below the waist. This experience makes him a bit crazed, intensifying his hatred for Cobra Commander. Unknown to Hawk, it was not Cobra Commander that shot him, for Zartan had switched places with the Commander shortly before the incident.

The Red Shadows organization finally steps forward, targeting members of both G.I. Joe and Cobra. Hawk is targeted, but is rescued from the Red Shadows by Scarlett, Snake Eyes and Kamakura. Red Shadows assassin Dela Eden attempts to kill Flint, but is stopped by Lady Jaye, who is then stabbed by Dela and dies. Dela is captured by Scarlett, who forms a plan with Flint and Hawk to investigate the Red Shadows organization. But the Red Shadows rescue Dela, and when G.I. Joe confronts them in New York, the leader of the Red Shadows Wilder Vaughn escapes. G.I. Joe is then deactivated by order of the President, given that Cobra as an organization has fractured, although Cobra Commander remains at large.

==== America's Elite ====
In the G.I. Joe: America's Elite series, Hawk is undergoing physiotherapy, and is rarely seen. General Joseph Colton again assumes command of the G.I. Joe team, at the President's request. Hawk is still obsessed with the capture of Cobra Commander, who had not been seen since Cobra's defeat a year earlier, and he sends the tracker Spirit on a classified mission to search the world for Cobra Commander. Spirit manages to locate Cobra Commander, but is captured. Spirit is later found and rescued, and reveals his findings to Hawk and the rest of the team. General Colton convinces Hawk to return to the team in an advisory role. He is a member of the team, when the Phoenix Guard infiltrates The Rock, and manages to capture several Joes including Hawk. The remaining Joes fight off the attack, as they finally discover the true identities of the Phoenix Guard members.

Hawk is forced to retreat from G.I. Joe headquarters during the events of World War III. With help from Destro and the Baroness, G.I. Joe is able to take back many of the areas controlled by Cobra. Cobra Commander and The Plague retreat to a secret base in the Appalachian Mountains, where the final battle takes place. General Colton is shot in the back by Cobra Commander, but survives. The battle ends when Hawk, using Velocity's jet pack, tackles Cobra Commander and knocks him out with a punch to the face. In the aftermath, Hawk and Colton are asked by the President to continue leading the G.I. Joe team, as it is fully reactivated. Cobra Commander is locked away in a special underwater prison, where Hawk later visits Cobra Commander and the two exchange words. Cobra Commander tells Hawk that when war breaks out again, Hawk will have him to thank for it. Hawk responds, "Maybe, Commander. But understand this: no matter what happens...you won't be taking part in any of it."

Hasbro later announced that all stories published by Devil's Due Publishing are no longer considered canonical, and are now considered an alternate continuity.

=== Alternate Continuities ===
==== G.I. Joe vs. the Transformers: Marvel ====
In the original alternate continuity series, the Joes come into conflict with the Transformers and Cobra over a mobile power station that could increase energy reserves for anyone who takes control over it. During the conflict, Hawk strikes up a brief romantic relationship with a U.S. Senator. This ends badly when the politician, disgraced by scandal, is murdered.

==== G.I. Joe vs. the Transformers: Devil's Due ====
Transformers Perceptor, Bumblebee, Grimlock and Arcee meet Hawk in the pages of G.I. Joe vs. the Transformers.

This series published by Devil's Due, is composed of four mini-series that chronicle a new origin to the G.I. Joe team. Hawk is the commander of a group of U.S. Army soldiers, including Stalker and Snake Eyes. Assigned to protect a peace conference in Washington D.C., they find themselves under attack by unknown forces using high-tech military-grade equipment. Some of this equipment transforms into high-tech robots.

After the attack, Hawk is made the leader of G.I. Joe, a special unit assembled for the purpose of taking down this terrorist organization, identifying itself as Cobra. G.I. Joe learns the truth about Cobra from both Mercer, a Cobra defector, and Wheeljack and Bumblebee, two alien robots who avoided being found when their ship was discovered by Cobra. With the help of an encrypted signal sent by Optimus Prime, the Joes discover the location of Cobra's hidden island base. As the Joes prepare for an assault on the island, Hawk receives orders to subdue the two alien robots that had allied with them, and take them to Area 51 for study, while the Cobra base is nuked. When Wheeljack warns Hawk about the catastrophic reaction of a nuclear explosion with the Energon Cobra was stockpiling, Hawk defies his orders and goes with his original invasion plan.

In volume 3, G.I. Joe vs. the Transformers: Art of War, Hawk is commander of the team stationed to protect a secret military base in Area 51. He is working with the Autobots to remove the remainder of Cybertronian technology from Earth, but later finds that the U.S. Military was secretly bioengineering a Super Soldier, Serpent O.R. from the remains of Megatron (the fallen Decepticon leader), and the genetic make-up of history's greatest military leaders. Hawk is part of the team that goes to Cybertron and is captured by the Decepticons. In the final battle, Hawk uses the Matrix and becomes connected to it.

In volume 4, G.I. Joe vs. the Transformers: Black Horizon, Hawk leaves the G.I. Joe team, after allegations of the events that occurred in Area 51, which branded him a traitor. He is still connected to the Matrix, and is troubled each night by a specific nightmare, which shows a future in which all humanity is destroyed. During an interview, Hawk is summoned by the Autobots, whom he is secretly working for, because they have discovered an ancient race in the Himalayan Mountains. Hawk investigates with the aid of Flint and Optimus Prime, and there they encounter Bludgeon and Cobra-La. As they are escaping, Prime is attacked by Bludgeon. Hawk uses his connection to the Matrix and uploads Energon energy to Bludgeon, which temporarily knocks him out. They find that they are trapped, until they meet General Joseph Colton, who knows of Hawk. Colton leads them further inside, and after a few battles with the Honor Guard of Cobra-La, the Joes put together a plan to save the day. Flint goes into space with spores designed to destroy technology, while Colton, Hawk, and Optimus Prime rescue Firewall and stop Cobra-La. Hawk faces off against Golobulus, and is aided by Optimus Prime. As the series ends, Hawk is seen again with the woman he once left, trying to put his life back together.

==== Fun Publications ====
In the mirror universe created by Fun Publications, Hawk's is Vice President Clayton "Clay" Abernathy, serving in the administration of U.S. President Joseph Colton. In the story Eye in the Sky, Clay advises the president during the loss of an orbital defense satellite to the evil Decepticons, and its eventual destruction thanks to the efforts of the heroic Autobots.

A version of Hawk is also among the members of The Convoy, a group of leaders from various realities united by the Transtech, in order to deal with various threats. Yet another version has his personality copied into the robot Serpent O.R., a Transformer version of Serpentor.

== Animated series ==
=== Sunbow ===
In the Sunbow G.I. Joe cartoon, General Hawk is voiced by Ed Gilbert. His first appearance is in the second season premiere "Arise, Serpentor, Arise!", in which he is brought in to lead the G.I. Joe team. His first task is to have Sgt. Slaughter retrain the Joe team, after a humiliating battle against Cobra forces. Though Sgt. Slaughter also has Hawk take part in the training as he is a Joe too. When Serpentor invades Washington DC, General Hawk disguises himself as the President of the United States to lead a surprise attack on Cobra.

There was no on-screen explanation as to when Hawk became the leader. However, according to Buzz Dixon in an interview for G.I. Joe: Yearbook #2, Hawk "has never been seen before because he was in Washington with the Joint Chiefs of Staff". In "Not A Ghost Of A Chance", it was further revealed that Hawk was also the founder of the G.I. Joe team. The character had appeared in early animated commercials for the comic books and toys with his original blond-haired design, but in the actual animated series he was depicted as having black hair.

==== G.I. Joe: The Movie ====
Hawk also appeared briefly in the 1987 animated film G.I. Joe: The Movie, voice again by Ed Gilbert. He sends Flint to lead a team to go find Roadblock's team when they disappear in the mountains looking for the fleeing Cobra members. After Serpentor is freed by the Dreadnoks with help from Nemesis Enforcer, General Hawk scolds Lt. Falcon for abandoning his post which led to Serpentor escaping and the Dreadnoks' new allies injuring Gung-Ho, Alpine and Bazooka in the process. General Hawk ends up confining Lt. Falcon to quarters until the court martial and he orders Low-Light and Scarlett to get Falcon out of his sight. At the court martial, General Hawk brings up the charges against Lt. Falcon which involved the incidents related to Serpentor's escape and not being present with the other Rawhides in Beach-Head's training exercise. Duke pleads to General Hawk to not inflict a harsh punishment on Lt. Falcon while mentioning that he is his brother. Upon discussing this with the other four generals, General Hawk decides to have Lt. Falcon reassigned to the Slaughterhouse to be properly trained by Sgt. Slaughter. After Duke is wounded while protecting Lt. Falcon from Serpentor's attack, General Hawk comforts Lt. Falcon and orders him and the other Rawhides to stay behind, while the rest of the Joes assault Cobra-La.

=== DiC series ===
In DiC Entertainment's G.I. Joe series, General Hawk (reprised by Ed Gilbert in Season One, voiced by David Kaye in Season Two) continues his leadership of G.I. Joe in their fight against Cobra. In the first season, he is seen wearing his flight suit and using his jetpack to coincide with the release of his new figure. In the second season, Hawk appeared more frequently, and wore the same uniform as his Talking Battle Commanders figure.

=== Sgt. Savage and his Screaming Eagles ===
Hawk appears in the pilot episode of Sgt. Savage and his Screaming Eagles titled "Old Heroes Never Die", voiced by David Kaye. Hawk, along with Doc and Lady Jaye, discover Sgt. Savage, who was frozen alive during World War II, and leave him in charge of a group of talented but irresponsible sergeants facing court martial. Savage quickly whips them into shape.

=== Valor vs. Venom ===
Hawk appeared in the direct-to-video CGI animated movie G.I. Joe: Valor vs. Venom, voiced by Phil Hayes. In this continuity, Hawk was abducted by Cobra and was mutated into Venomous Maximus (voiced by Frank Salazar) upon being injected with the Venom formula and the DNA samples of unspecified apex predators. Following that transformation, Venomous Maximus collaborates with Overkill to venomize the human population. The Joes restore Hawk to his old self with an antidote at the end of the film.

=== Sigma 6 ===
Hawk appears in G.I. Joe: Sigma 6, voiced by Anthony Salerno. Hawk is still recuperating in the hospital from the events of G.I. Joe: Valor vs. Venom and serves as a mentor to Duke. It is revealed that Hawk has a teenage son named Scott who is an expert with computers. Hawk is also afraid that Cobra might become too strong for the Joes alone and commissions Lt. Stone to create a new Sub Base and several new vehicles which are revealed in the opening of Season 2. Hawk is not seen again after Season 1.

=== Renegades ===
General Abernathy appears in G.I. Joe: Renegades, voiced by Lee Majors. In this series, General Abernathy is depicted as a bald man with an eye patch. General Abernathy is a full general in the US Military, who doesn't trust Cobra Industries. When he gets a call from Scarlett about what she learned, General Abernathy tells her that her team made the front news. When Duke claims they were set up, General Abernathy tells them to turn themselves in because unless they have proof of their innocence, he can't help them. When General Abernathy asks Baroness if she needs help quarantining the nearby town and Baroness says that the military has done enough. General Abernathy then appoints Flint to lead a team of military officers to bring Duke's team in. In "Revelations" Pt. 2, General Abernathy is with the Falcons, when the Joes and Professor Patrick O'Hara turn themselves in with the proof that General Abernathy wanted. General Abernathy then plans a debriefing as he shows the group that Breaker is officially working for both of them.

== Live action film ==
General Hawk
- G.I. Joe character
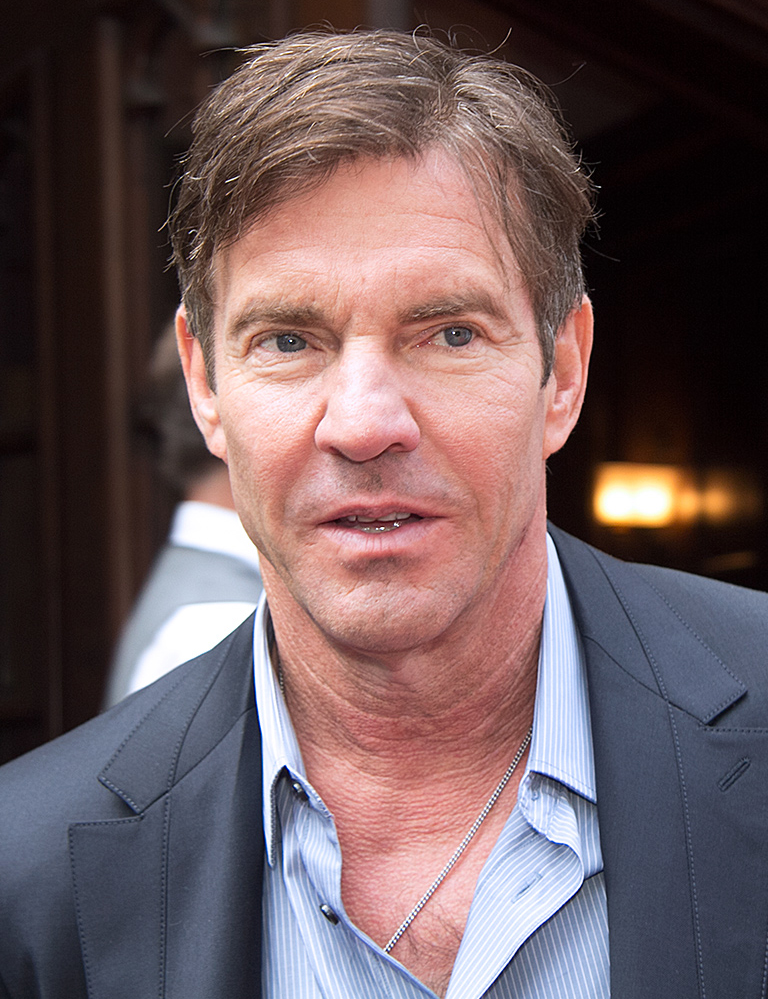
- Dennis Quaid portrays Hawk in G.I. Joe: The Rise of Cobra
- First appearance: 2009
- Portrayed by: Dennis Quaid
- Voiced by: Josh Robert Thompson

In-universe information
- Affiliation: G.I. Joe
- Specialty: Team Leader
- File name: Clayton M. Abernathy
- SN: 142-27-CM46
- Rank: O-10 (General)
- Series: G.I. Joe: The Rise of Cobra

Dennis Quaid portrays Hawk in the 2009 live-action film G.I. Joe: The Rise of Cobra. In the film, NATO troops led by American soldiers Duke and Ripcord are asked to deliver four warheads, which are capable of destroying anything from tanks to cities, with nanomites designed to devour metal and other materials. Their convoy is ambushed by the Baroness, whom Duke recognizes to be his ex-fiancee Ana Lewis. Duke and Ripcord are rescued by Scarlett, Snake Eyes, Breaker, and Heavy Duty, who take the warheads to The Pit, G.I. Joe's command center in Egypt, and rendezvous with Hawk, the head of the G.I. Joe team. Hawk takes command of the warheads, and excuses Duke and Ripcord, only to be convinced to let them join his team after Duke reveals that he knows the Baroness.

Later, Hawk is injured by Storm Shadow and has to use a wheelchair for some time. By the end of the film, he has healed from his injuries and is walking unaided. Cover Girl was his aide-de-camp until she was murdered by Zartan during Storm Shadow and Zartan's attack on their base.

== Video games ==
Hawk is featured in the 1991 console video game, G.I. Joe, released for the Nintendo Entertainment System (NES). His appearance is based on the 1991 edition of his action figure. He initially serves as the player's commanding officer, but becomes playable for the game's final mission. Hawk is also featured as a playable character in the 1992 follow-up, G.I. Joe: The Atlantis Factor, also released for the NES. Unlike the first NES game, Hawk serves as the default playable character in the sequel, as he seeks out the other members of the Joe Team throughout the game.

General Hawk appears as a non-playable, supporting character in the video game G.I. Joe: The Rise of Cobra, voiced by Josh Robert Thompson.

== Other works ==
Hawk is briefly discussed in the non-fiction novel 'Paradise Of Bombs'.

Hawk's figure is mentioned for a short period in the non fiction novel 6 Sick Hipsters. In the story, the character Paul Achting spent four years collecting G.I. Joe figures to set up a battle scene between the Joes and Cobra. As he imagined the characters in his head, he described four of the Joes on front lines of the battle: Hawk, Leatherneck, Wet Suit, and Sci-Fi "stood in procession, weapons raised, adrenaline pumping feverishly. Anxious for another victory over the dreaded Cobra." He described how Hawk, "the original field commander, was now a general. This battle would be the one that defined his military career. The one that [sic] make or break him."
