= List of G.I. Joe: A Real American Hero episodes =

This list of G.I. Joe: A Real American Hero episodes covers the Sunbow/Marvel 1983–1986 series, the 1987 feature film, and the DiC 1989-1992 series.

== Sunbow/Marvel releases (1983–1987) ==
=== Miniseries #1 (1983) ===
No. overall	No. in season	Title	Directed by	Written by	Original release date	Prod. code
1	1	"The M.A.S.S. Device, Part 1: The Cobra Strikes"	Dan Thompson	Ron Friedman	September 12, 1983	4005
When The U.S. military prepares to launch their satellite into orbit, Cobra develops the ultimate weapon known as the M.A.S.S. device, planning to steal the satellite. G.I. Joe is called into action, their leader General Flagg has Scarlett, Snake Eyes and Stalker test the satellite installation's security. But while in disguise, the Baroness tags the satellite with a homing device, causing Cobra to use their device to transport forces stealing the satellite. Meanwhile, Duke is captured during the transport and the rest of the Joes must rescue him.
2	2	"The M.A.S.S. Device, Part 2: Slave of the Cobra Master"	Dan Thompson	Ron Friedman	September 13, 1983	4006
The Joes begin the race to acquire the elements necessary to build their own MASS device. Cobra kidnaps Duke, using mind control device to put him in a gladiator type environment called the Arena of Sport. After Cobra discovers the Joes are searching for radioactive crystals, the race begins. Snake Eyes sacrifices himself to save his friends, acquiring the crystals while he is poisoned from the radioactivity. Duke is able to break the mind control device and is rescued by MEDEVAC. The M.A.S.S. Device, Part 2: Slave of the Cobra Master includes the introduction of the second female G.I. Joe team member, Cover Girl.
3	3	"The M.A.S.S. Device, Part 3: The Worms of Death"	Dan Thompson	Ron Friedman	September 14, 1983	4007
The Joes and Cobra vie to find the heavy water element. Mysterious underwater tube worms cause both teams to agree to a ceasefire to thwart off the worms, allowing both teams to successfully recover the heavy water. Snake Eyes struggles to remain alive in a snow storm and is suffering from radioactive poisoning. He manages to save a wolf (Timber) who becomes his makeshift pet. The pair are rescued by a blind hermit who cures Snake Eyes of his poisoning and injuries. The Joes are overjoyed to see their comrade alive and with the crystals. However, his canister was booby trapped by Cobra; causing poison gas to flood the air.
4	4	"The M.A.S.S. Device, Part 4: Duel in the Devil's Cauldron"	Dan Thompson	Ron Friedman	September 15, 1983	4008
After Covergirl and Timber save the lives of the G.I. Joe team, the Joes continue to search for a way to stop the Cobra terrorist organization. Both forces begin missions to retrieve the third element, a meteorite buried in a volcano. The Joes try to lift the meteorite, but are thwarted by Cobra, led by Destro, who causes the volcano to erupt, ejecting the meteor. But both forces obtain the third element. The Joes have all three elements and want to attack Cobra, but Duke has no recollection of where Cobra Mountain is located.
5	5	"The M.A.S.S. Device, Part 5: A Stake in the Serpent's Heart"	Dan Thompson	Ron Friedman	September 16, 1983	4009
Cobra attempts to destroy New York City, but the Joes counter it with their new MASS device. The Joes notice the ring Duke gave to the slave girl was a homing device, and they teleport to Cobra Mountain. The Joes arrive at Cobra headquarters to launch their assault. Destro redirects the MASS device toward the Earth's core to disintegrate it. Cobra Commander, in panic, enlists the help of the Joes to stop the device. After successfully destroying the device, Cobra Commander is arrested and Destro escapes.

=== Miniseries #2 (1984) ===
No. overall	No. in season	Title	Directed by	Written by	Original release date	Prod. code
6	1	"The Revenge of Cobra, Part 1: In the Cobra's Pit"	Dan Thompson	Ron Friedman	September 10, 1984	4018
Cobra attacks a G.I. Joe convoy, and steals a high-powered experimental "laser core". During the battle to protect the core, both Duke and Snake Eyes are captured by Cobra agents. Once back at Cobra's base, Destro uses the core to complete his latest weapon...the "Weather Dominator". When Flint and the other Joes launch an air assault and rescue mission, Destro uses the device, and it's stormy skies ahead for the Joe team.
7	2	"The Revenge of Cobra, Part 2: The Vines of Evil"	Dan Thompson	Ron Friedman	September 11, 1984	4019
Cobra Commander has Duke and Snake Eyes fight each other in a gladiatorial combat in his "Arena of Sport". Cobra plans to assault Washington D.C., but Duke and Snake Eyes send a Morse code to their team. The Joes successfully defend D.C., but they destroy the weather device by splitting it into three pieces scattered globally. Weather patterns all over the world are in havoc; G.I. Joe must recover the three parts before Cobra, or all is lost.
8	3	"The Revenge of Cobra, Part 3: The Palace of Doom"	Dan Thompson	Ron Friedman	September 12, 1984	4020
Cobra and the Joes head for "The Palace of Doom", an alleged cursed Aztec temple, to retrieve the first fragment, the "Ion Correlator". Cutter, Wild Bill and Spirit along with Doc, Torpedo, Clutch and Rock 'n Roll head to an unstable island in the Pacific called the "Island of No Return" to retrieve another fragment, the "Hydro Master", and are opposed by the Baroness, Firefly and Zartan. The Joes retrieve the correlator, but they lose the fragment to Major Bludd during an earthquake.
9	4	"The Revenge of Cobra, Part 4: Battle on the Roof of the World"	Dan Thompson	Ron Friedman	September 13, 1984	4021
On the Island of No Return, Spirit saves Storm Shadow from drowning while escaping from an underground river. In return for his heroism, Storm Shadow allows Spirit to keep the fragment. Flint, Lady Jaye, Snow Job, Spirit, Gung-ho and Shipwreck head to the North Pole to retrieve the third fragment, the laser core, and are opposed by Destro and Zartan. But Zartan finds the third fragment, and he blackmails the Joes and Cobra that the final fragment will belong to the highest bidder.
10	5	"The Revenge of Cobra, Part 5: Amusement Park of Terror"	Dan Thompson	Ron Friedman	September 14, 1984	4022
Zartan broadcasts an unsecured message to the Joes and Cobra offering to bargain for his particular fragment. Both sides trace his call to an amusement park. Cobra captures Zartan, and now they possess all the pieces of the Weather Dominator, since Storm Shadow infiltrated Joe headquarters and stole their fragment. Duke and company raid the Cobra Command center as Roadblock uses vines to attack Destro. The Joes are able to rescue Duke and company, apprehend Cobra Commander and undo the Weather Dominator's effects. However, Destro and Zartan manage to escape on a hang-glider.

=== Season 1 (1985) ===
No. overall	No. in season	Title	Directed by	Written by	Original release date	Prod. code
11	1	"The Pyramid of Darkness, Part 1: The Further Adventures of G.I. Joe"	John Gibbs and Terry Lennon	Ron Friedman	September 16, 1985	600-37
Zartan and the Dreadnoks capture Space Station Delta and destroy G.I. Joe headquarters as phase one of Cobra's "Pyramid of Darkness", a plan for Cobra Commander to deprive the world of electricity.
12	2	"The Pyramid of Darkness, Part 2: Rendezvous in the City of the Dead"	John Gibbs and Terry Lennon	Ron Friedman	September 17, 1985	600-38
As G.I. Joe sets up their base of operations on the U.S.S. Flagg, on Delta Space Station, Dusty and Mutt warn the team about Cobra's plan to plant cubes at strategic locations in order to create the pyramid of darkness. Shipwreck and Snake Eyes travel underneath Enterprise City with secret control cubes, while the rest of the Joes plans to stop Destro from activating the first cube at the "Devil's Playground".
13	3	"The Pyramid of Darkness, Part 3: Three Cubes to Darkness"	John Gibbs and Terry Lennon	Ron Friedman	September 18, 1985	600-39
Tomax is captured by G.I. Joe, causing his identical twin brother Xamot to plan on rescuing him before Cobra can activate the final cube in the "Sea of Lost Souls". Shipwreck and Snake Eyes find an ally in a pop singer named "Satin", who helps them escape Cobra's troopers in Enterprise City.
14	4	"The Pyramid of Darkness, Part 4: Chaos in the Sea of Lost Souls"	John Gibbs and Terry Lennon	Ron Friedman	September 19, 1985	600-40
Cobra activates the Pyramid of Darkness, leaving the Joes stranded at sea. The Crimson Twins anticipate Cobra Commander's treachery and signal for the Dreadnoks to relieve Zartan and Cobra Commander of control. Alpine and Bazooka ally with Quick Kick, a stuntman and karate expert from Hollywood.
15	5	"The Pyramid of Darkness, Part 5: Knotting Cobra's Coils"	John Gibbs and Terry Lennon	Ron Friedman	September 20, 1985	600-41
G.I. Joe regains control of Space Station Delta, and they launch a full-scale assault on Cobra Temple, destroying the control cubes and the Pyramid of Darkness.
16	6	"Countdown for Zartan"	John Gibbs and Terry Lennon	Christy Marx	September 23, 1985	600-02
Zartan is sent to plant a bomb within the worldwide defense center, but is caught by Gung-Ho, who toys with his psyche to try and get Zartan to reveal where the bomb is planted.
17	7	"Red Rocket's Glare"	John Gibbs and Terry Lennon	Mary Skrenes	September 24, 1985	600-12
Cobra, through Extensive Enterprises, opens a series of Red Rocket restaurants with armed photon disintegrator warheads atop each restaurant location. They intend to launch and detonate the warheads if the U.S. Government and G.I. Joe do not hand over complete control to Cobra Commander, who demonstrates what will become of every location where a Red Rocket restaurant has been built.
18	8	"Satellite Down"	John Gibbs and Terry Lennon	Ted Pedersen	September 25, 1985	600-13
Cobra tries to steal a spy satellite, but Breaker stops them by forcing the satellite to crash in the African jungle. Efforts to recover the satellite by both Cobra and G.I. Joe are complicated by a tribe of African primitives.
19	9	"Cobra Stops the World"	John Gibbs and Terry Lennon	Steve Gerber	September 26, 1985	600-05
In an effort to take control of the world's fuel supply, Cobra launches attacks on the world's oil reserves.
20	10	"Jungle Trap"	John Gibbs and Terry Lennon	Paul Dini	September 27, 1985	600-06
In a plan to attack the world's cities with lava, Dr. Shakur, a scientist who invented the Vulcan Machine, is captured by Cobra. G.I. Joe must head into Cobra's jungle base, rescue the doctor and stop Cobra from carrying out their mission before these cities literally become "hotspots".
21	11	"Cobra's Creatures"	John Gibbs and Terry Lennon	Kimmer Ringwald	September 30, 1985	600-01
Cobra uses a special weapon called "Hi-Freq" given to them by an evil scientist named Dr. Lucifer, which a mind control device that takes over all animals in the animal kingdom, including Mutt's dog Junkyard. G.I. Joe has to stop Cobra's Hi-Freq device and save every animal in the world, especially Junkyard who isn't man's best friend, but Mutt's worst enemy.
22	12	"The Funhouse"	John Gibbs and Terry Lennon	Steve Mitchell and Barbara Petty	October 1, 1985	600-23
Several scientists have been captured by Cobra and imprisoned in South America, prompting the Joes to rescue them and go through Cobra's booby-trapped "funhouse".
23	13	"Twenty Questions"	John Gibbs and Terry Lennon	Buzz Dixon	October 2, 1985	600-19
The Joes discover Cobra's plan to invade the Rocky Mountain Chemical Weapons Arsenal to possess explosive gas, all while under scrutiny from Hector Ramirez, host of the television show Twenty Questions.
24	14	"The Greenhouse Effect"	John Gibbs and Terry Lennon	Gordon Kent	October 3, 1985	600-21
A top secret nitrogen rocket fuel is stolen from the Joes and is accidentally stored in a greenhouse. The plants grow immensely, giving Destro a plan to seed the world with mutated fruits and vegetables to crush G.I. Joe in a gigantic jungle.
25	15	"Haul Down the Heavens"	John Gibbs and Terry Lennon	Buzz Dixon	October 4, 1985	600-07
Cobra creates a weapon called the "Ion Attractor" that can pull down the Aurora Borealis to melt the polar icecaps and flood the world. G.I. Joe and a group of scientists must head north to prevent a global disaster.
26	16	"Synthoid Conspiracy, Part I"	John Gibbs and Terry Lennon	Christy Marx	October 7, 1985	600-16
Zartan makes constructs called synthoids, artificial beings or life forms loyal only to Cobra. Cobra makes Synthoids of Admiral Ledger, Colonel Sharp, General Franks, General Howe, and Duke to cut off G.I. Joe's resources and undermine morale.
27	17	"Synthoid Conspiracy, Part II"	John Gibbs and Terry Lennon	Christy Marx	October 8, 1985	600-17
Betrayed by an impostor in their ranks, G.I. Joe is disbanded by the government. Now fugitives from the military, the Joes must ally with Destro who gives them information on how to defeat Cobra Commander and Zartan to regain their resources.
28	18	"The Phantom Brigade"	John Gibbs and Terry Lennon	Sharman Divono	October 9, 1985	600-15
Cobra Commander and the Baroness hire a Gypsy to summon three ghosts; a Centurion warrior, a Mongolian Amazon, and a World War I American pilot ace, to destroy G.I. Joe. The Baroness informs the Joes to locate a Roman coin, a wedding ring, and heart-shaped locket from Cobra Commander, and then bury the items to make the ghosts disappear.
29	19	"Lights! Camera! Cobra!"	John Gibbs and Terry Lennon	Buzz Dixon	October 10, 1985	600-10
Cobra Commander's personal Firebat with a homing signal was located at a Hollywood studio for a filming of "The G.I. Joe Story". Cobra hires Zartan and the Dreadnoks to recapture the Firebat before G.I. Joe can discover it and use the homing device to attack Cobra headquarters.
30	20	"Cobra's Candidate"	John Gibbs and Terry Lennon	Gordon Kent	October 11, 1985	600-11
A sleazy political candidate hires Cobra to cause trouble for his opponent Robert Harper during their mayoral campaign race. They keep sending gang members to harass and ruin his campaign. But G.I. Joe is sent in to restore law and order.
31	21	"Money to Burn"	John Gibbs and Terry Lennon	Roger Slifer	October 14, 1985	600-14
Cobra invents a molecular de-generator to disrupt all U.S. currency and replace it with their own minted Cobra currency. The Joes must destroy the machine before Cobra's plan comes to fruition.
32	22	"Operation: Mind Menace"	John Gibbs and Terry Lennon	Martin Pasko	October 15, 1985	600-09
Cobra captures people with psionic abilities in order to exploit their powers to rule the world. One of them is Airborne's telekinetic younger brother Tommy.
33	23	"Battle for the Train of Gold"	John Gibbs and Terry Lennon	David Carren	October 16, 1985	600-08
Cobra steals all the gold bars from Fort Knox and loads it inside a bullet train. G.I. Joe plans on stopping the Cobra Bullet before it reaches the coast.
34	24	"Cobra Soundwaves"	John Gibbs and Terry Lennon	Ted Pedersen	October 17, 1985	600-04
Cobra develops a powerful sound weapon and attacks a sheik's oil supply with it in the Middle East. G.I. Joe must stop Cobra before they leak oil everywhere.
35	25	"Where the Reptiles Roam"	John Gibbs and Terry Lennon	Carla Conway and Gerry Conway	October 18, 1985	600-24
Wild Bill and a few Joes head to a farm in Texas to investigate a dude ranch located near solar panels that was captured by Cobra in their attempt to control a nearby power station.
36	26	"The Gamemaster"	John Gibbs and Terry Lennon	Flint Dille	October 21, 1985	600-20
A twisted tycoon captures Flint, Lady Jaye, Cobra Commander, and The Baroness, who must work together to escape the life-size toys that are attacking them. Destro and Duke lead their teams to rescue them, and due to the rules of engagement, both sides will not attempt to capture the other.
37	27	"Lasers in the Night"	John Gibbs and Terry Lennon	Marv Wolfman	October 22, 1985	600-25
The Baroness spies on the Joes to gain access to the laser guidance system for Cobra Commander. While giving a martial arts demonstration, Quick Kick meets Amber, a college student who dreams of being a Joe. The pair soon date and as Amber gets closer to the Joes' secrets, which causes them to think she is a Cobra spy.
38	28	"The Germ"	John Gibbs and Terry Lennon	Roger Slifer	October 23, 1985	600-26
Cobra steals a dangerous bacteria that causes a strong bacterium and growth serum to form a living germ monster that consumes everything in its path.
39	29	"The Viper is Coming"	John Gibbs and Terry Lennon	David Carren	October 24, 1985	600-22
At his fire station, Barbecue keeps getting cryptic phone calls from a heavily-accented man who calls himself "The Viper". Barbecue enlists the rest of the Joes to help him catch this mysterious man, whose messages strangely lead the Joes to various secret Cobra installations.
40	30	"Spell of the Siren"	John Gibbs and Terry Lennon	Carla Conway and Gerry Conway	October 25, 1985	600-18
The Baroness uses the song of the Sirens to put the males under her evil spell. With their male comrades under the Baroness' control, Cover Girl, Lady Jaye, and Scarlett are the only ones who can stop her and set their hypnotized friends free.
41	31	"Cobra Quake"	John Gibbs and Terry Lennon	Ted Pedersen	October 28, 1985	600-31
In an attempt to stop a world financial summit, Cobra heads to Japan to cause an artificially created earthquake that will destroy Tokyo unless G.I. Joe can stop their plans.
42	32	"Captives of Cobra, Part I"	John Gibbs and Terry Lennon	Christy Marx	October 29, 1985	600-28
Cobra kidnaps family members of several G.I. Joe members and brainwashes them to obey the Baroness' commands. The Baroness commands the captives to attack the Joes in her attempt to retrieve explosive crystals that Cobra created.
43	33	"Captives of Cobra, Part II"	John Gibbs and Terry Lennon	Christy Marx	October 30, 1985	600-36
Scarlett and the other Joes set out to find a way to free their families from the Baroness' control. Meanwhile, the Baroness will stop at nothing to obtain the crystals.
44	34	"Bazooka Saw a Sea Serpent"	John Gibbs and Terry Lennon	Mary Skrenes	October 31, 1985	600-29
While camping, Bazooka sees a Cobra flight pod get "eaten" by a giant sea serpent. In reality, this "sea serpent" is a Cobra submarine planning to steal everything it devours. But when it goes out of control, the sea serpent goes on a rampage and the Joes must stop it from destroying New York.
45	35	"Excalibur"	John Gibbs and Terry Lennon	Dan DiStefano	November 1, 1985	600-32
G.I. Joe sets up a radar tracking station in England while Storm Shadow finds King Arthur's legendary sword Excalibur at the bottom of a lake and uses its strength to attack the Joes and destroy their station.
46	36	"Worlds Without End, Part I"	John Gibbs and Terry Lennon	Martin Pasko	November 4, 1985	600-27
During a struggle between G.I. Joe and Cobra, an accident triggers an experimental weapon. As a result, the Joes are plunged into unconsciousness. When they awaken, the explosion hurls them into an alternate reality, where Cobra has defeated G.I. Joe and conquered the world.
47	37	"Worlds Without End, Part II"	John Gibbs and Terry Lennon	Martin Pasko	November 5, 1985	600-34
While stuck in the alternate world, the Joes find an unlikely ally, the Baroness. Steeler learns that the Baroness of this world is a double agent and his beloved. She helps rescue the Joes and sends them back to their own home world. But Steeler, Clutch, and Grunt decide to stay in the other world after seeing what Cobra had done to their alternate selves.
48	38	"Eau De Cobra"	John Gibbs and Terry Lennon	Flint Dille	November 6, 1985	600-35
Destro concocts a love potion out of Cleopatra's perfume for the Baroness to make a wealthy shipping tycoon fall in love with her, but things go awry when Lady Jaye is sprayed with the scent.
49	39	"Cobra Claws Are Coming to Town"	John Gibbs and Terry Lennon	Carla Conway and Gerry Conway; Story by : Dann Thomas and Roy Thomas	November 7, 1985	600-33
It's Christmas Eve and most of the Joes have gone home for the holidays. After using special growth/shrinking ray and special toys slipped into the donated toys for charity, Cobra ends up successfully infiltrating the G.I. Joe Headquarters, captures the Joes present, and rewires the Joes equipment. They plan on attacking Keystone City on Christmas to have residents believe the Joes have turned treacherous against them.
50	40	"An Eye for an Eye"	John Gibbs and Terry Lennon	Steve Mitchell and Barbara Petty	November 8, 1985	600-42
While in the midst of transporting valuables, G.I. Joe gets ambushed by Cobra, causing them to accidentally set a remote cabin in the mountains on fire. This makes the cabin's owner, Charles Fairmont, demand retribution against Cobra, and Lady Jaye helps him with his revenge.
51	41	"The Gods Below"	John Gibbs and Terry Lennon	Gordon Kent	November 11, 1985	600-47
Cobra heads for Egypt to steal the treasure of Osiris in an underground tomb. G.I. Joe find themselves facing him and the Egyptian gods while Cobra faces Set, the Egyptian god of evil.
52	42	"Primordial Plot"	John Gibbs and Terry Lennon	Donald F. Glut	November 12, 1985	600-43
Cobra steals dinosaur bones and kidnaps a biologist to make him recreate the dinosaurs in a cloning device with rapid growth serum in order to destroy G.I. Joe and rule the world.
53	43	"Flint's Vacation"	John Gibbs and Terry Lennon	Beth Bornstein	November 13, 1985	600-44
Flint visits his cousins in Pleasant Cove, an experimental community secretly owned by Cobra. He soon finds out that they, along with the town's entire population, are television-brainwashed slaves of Cobra, and if captured, Flint may be joining them.
54	44	"Hearts and Cannons"	John Gibbs and Terry Lennon	Larry Houston; Story by : Alfred A. Pegal	November 14, 1985	600-45
Dusty and Footloose must help Dr. Nancy Winters, a scientist who was tricked into designing a plasma cannon for Destro and is being held captive by his men. Dusty and Footloose decide to rescue her. They steal a Cobra vehicle in attempt to rescue her when they meet a man named Ahmed Razouli Jabal, a king who plans on avenging the capture of his people by Cobra and liberating them from his country.
55	45	"Memories of Mara"	John Gibbs and Terry Lennon	Sharmon Divono	November 15, 1985	600-48
The Joes go underwater to find a nuclear submarine called the Nerka, and rescue a crew being held captive by Cobra. Helping in the search is Mara, a woman Shipwreck saved from drowning who has blue skin that was genetically modified by Cobra to be the first of many "aquatic commandos".
56	46	"The Traitor, Part 1"	John Gibbs and Terry Lennon	Buzz Dixon	November 25, 1985	600-30
G.I. Joe designs a new armor treatment that's impenetrable to laser fire and missiles. While on leave, Dusty is desperate after seeing his mother struggle with her asthma and mounting medical bills, so he makes a deal with Extensive Enterprises' Crimson Twins to pay for the costs in return for the armor formula. He secretly informs Cobra about it, leading his team into an ambush that leaves Duke in a coma. The Joes now have a traitor in their midst.
57	47	"The Traitor, Part 2"	John Gibbs and Terry Lennon	Buzz Dixon	November 26, 1985	600-46
In order to prove himself in Cobra, Dusty must battle a Cobra soldier named Lt. Claymore in the "Arena of Death". G.I. Joe revamp security and launch a full-scale assault against their former comrade and Cobra to protect their armor treatment project. But when the Joes are captured by Cobra Commander to be subjects for his mind control gas, an unexpected twist of events proves that not all is what it seems.
58	48	"The Pit of Vipers"	John Gibbs and Terry Lennon	James M. Ward; Story by : Flint Dille	November 27, 1985	600-51
Colonel Sharp buys an advanced computer program code-named "Watchdog" to be the new Joe commander, until they discover it's owned by Cobra. The program orders Admiral Ledger on the U.S.S. Flagg to attack the Cobra ship Cerebus, but it disappeared in the Indian Ocean. Now Flint, Lady Jaye, and Heavy Metal have to take out Watchdog along with its faux designer, Dr. Hamler.
59	49	"The Wrong Stuff"	John Gibbs and Terry Lennon	Stanley Ralph Ross; Story by : Flint Dille	November 28, 1985	600-49
Cobra captures satellites to create their own television network. G.I. Joe must head into space and destroy the space station before Cobra's propaganda infects everyone in the world.
60	50	"The Invaders"	John Gibbs and Terry Lennon	Dennis O’Neil	November 29, 1985	600-52
Cobra devises a plot to take control of Washington D.C. and Moscow with the aid of UFOs, causing suspicion and paranoia between the U.S. and the Soviet Union. G.I. Joe and the Oktober Guard, an elite Russian combat force, reluctantly join forces to stop Cobra.
61	51	"Cold Slither"	John Gibbs and Terry Lennon	Michael Charles Hill	December 2, 1985	600-55
After Cobra is disbanded, Destro invents a "subliminal enslavement program" to bend the will of the population to Cobra's way of thinking. Zartan and the Dreadnoks form a rock band called "Cold Slither" to perform music with subliminal messages as part of Cobra taking control of the minds of the masses. But Breaker, Footloose, and Shipwreck get caught up in the music and go to their concert, forcing the Joes to pursue them and put a stop to Cobra.
62	52	"The Great Alaskan Land Rush"	John Gibbs and Terry Lennon	David Carren	December 3, 1985	600-56
G.I. Joe and the Oktober Guard need to locate the real Seal of Alaska before Cobra takes control of Alaska and its resources. While searching, the Joes and Red Oktober get captured by 19th-century Cossacks, who bring them to Captain Lukrov, who owns the seal. After he loses it to Cobra, Duke makes a deal with Lukrov to retrieve it.
63	53	"Skeletons in the Closet"	John Gibbs and Terry Lennon	Flint Dille	December 11, 1985	600-57
Lady Jaye receives a letter of inheritance from Dame Agatha Doyle, leaving her a Loch Lomond manor house that turns out to be Destro's ancestral castle. She witnesses a winter solstice ritual to raise the power of evil, and if seen, she may be forced to participate in, leaving Flint and G.I. Joe to come rescue her. It is revealed that Lady Jaye and Destro share an ancestry, thus making them long-lost cousins. This knowledge does not sit well with the two of them, but they reluctantly accept and respect it.
64	54	"There's No Place Like Springfield, Part 1"	John Gibbs and Terry Lennon	Steve Gerber	December 12, 1985	600-58
While on an island, Lady Jaye and Shipwreck are on a rescue mission to save Professor Mullany, a scientist who claims to have developed a formula capable of turning water into an explosive. When they find him, he implants the secret formula into Shipwreck's brain, which can only be released by a secret code word he gives to Lady Jaye. Shipwreck passes out trying to escape after a Cobra assault and wakes up six years later in a town called Springfield, with Mara (from the earlier episode "Memories of Mara") as his wife and a daughter named Althea. G.I. Joe has won the war against Cobra, but Shipwreck tries to find out how in the years he's missed.
65	55	"There's No Place Like Springfield, Part 2"	John Gibbs and Terry Lennon	Steve Gerber	December 13, 1985	600-59
When Shipwreck is plagued by nightmares of what happened in the past six years he's missed, but he soon discovers this might be Cobra's plan to extract Mullany's formula from his mind. Knowing something is amiss when he realizes he hadn't aged in the supposed time he was comatose, Shipwreck calls the Joes to Temple Alpha, actually a Cobra island base posing as Springfield, and they plan to take down Cobra once and for all.

=== Season 2 (1986) ===
No. overall	No. in season	Title	Directed by	Written by	Original release date	Prod. code
66	1	"Arise, Serpentor, Arise!, Part 1"	Ray Lee	Story by : Buzz Dixon; Teleplay by : Ron Friedman	September 15, 1986	600-73
After being inspired by a strange dream and fed up with Cobra Commander's failures, the fiendish Doctor Mindbender plans to obtain the DNA samples of history's greatest conquerors in order to make a new Cobra leader. The Joes embark on a mini-remedial recruit training and intercept and destroy a Cobra Night Raven, retrieving a Cobra message pod. The Joes find a letter detailing the Dreadnoks' mission to break into tombs of history's greatest leaders and conquerors. Meanwhile, the Joes gain an ally in Sgt. Slaughter (based on the professional wrestler of the same name), while the Dreadnoks gain new members Monkeywrench and Thrasher and his Thunder Machine as well as Zartan's brother Zandar and sister Zarana
67	2	"Arise, Serpentor, Arise!, Part 2"	Ray Lee	Story by : Buzz Dixon; Teleplay by : Ron Friedman	September 16, 1986	600-74
The Joes set off to protect the tombs. Zarana tricks the Joes into leaving the tomb of the Egyptian General undefended, allowing her to steal the DNA. In Paris, Cobra troops arrive by submarine and the Crimson Twins get into Napoleon's tomb. The Joes are unable to stop Cobra from getting Montezuma's DNA, and the Baroness succeeds in stealing the DNA of Vlad Tepes in Transylvania.
68	3	"Arise, Serpentor, Arise!, Part 3"	Ray Lee	Story by : Buzz Dixon; Teleplay by : Ron Friedman	September 17, 1986	600-75
Sgt. Slaughter and his group defends Genghis Khan's tomb while Shipwreck's group defends Alexander the Great's underwater tomb. The Joes think Cobra is using those stolen DNA samples to build an army of genetic super soldiers, not knowing of the real nature of their plot. After Sgt. Slaughter costs Dr. Mindbender the DNA of Sun Tzu, Mindbender plans to use Slaughter's own DNA as a substitute.
69	4	"Arise, Serpentor, Arise!, Part 4"	Ray Lee	Story by : Buzz Dixon; Teleplay by : Ron Friedman	September 18, 1986	600-76
The Joes plan an attack on Cobra Island and suddenly find out Cobra's true plan for the stolen DNA samples: to create the Cobra leader. Cobra Commander is successful in sabotaging the experiment to regain control of Cobra, but is betrayed by Scrap-Iron, who informs Mindbender of his sabotage. Mindbender retries his experiment and this time is successful, giving birth to the creation of Serpentor, the new Cobra Emperor.
70	5	"Arise, Serpentor, Arise!, Part 5"	Ray Lee	Story by : Buzz Dixon; Teleplay by : Ron Friedman	September 19, 1986	600-77
Serpentor is born and installed as the new Emperor of Cobra, who decide to follow him to victory. Sgt. Slaughter is able to destroy the stolen DNA, but is too late in informing the Joes as Serpentor has successfully taken over Washington D.C., leaving the Joes to try and retake the Capitol from Cobra and the new Emperor.
71	6	"Last Hour to Doomsday"	Ray Lee	Tom Dagenais	September 25, 1986	600-50
Cobra demands the U.S. to submit or they will use a giant vortex to destroy the East Coast of the United States. Flint and Lady Jaye decide to take on this mission to stop them in order to prove the Joes that the two lovers can work effectively as a team and save the day. Note: This particular episode seems to have been written and produced before the "Arise, Serpentor, Arise!" mini-series; in fact, it appears to be a leftover Season 1 episode, although some Season 2 characters also appear. The emphasis is on classic characters Flint, Lady Jaye, Destro, the Baroness, and Cobra Commander; the Joes are using Dragonfly helicopters instead of the newer Tomahawks; Cobra is using Rattlers instead of the newer Night Ravens; Firebats are colored silver instead of the red from Season 2; Cobra Soldiers are the Cobra infantry troopers instead of Vipers; and Cobra Commander appears to still be in charge of Cobra. There is no mention whatsoever of Serpentor, and Destro and Baroness report to the Commander throughout the entire episode.
72	7	"Computer Complications"	Ray Lee	David Schwartz	September 26, 1986	600-53
A space probe containing anti-matter crashes into the ocean and both Joes and Cobra try to retrieve it. Zarana is sent in to sabotage robot submarines under the guise of a Government computer specialist named Carol Weidler, whom Mainframe, the Joes' computer specialist, falls in love with. Cobra steals the probe, using the anti-matter to power their aircraft, which then crashes into the USS Flagg, which sinks, with neither side victorious.
73	8	"Sink the Montana!"	Ray Lee	David Carren	September 29, 1986	600-54
While at a decommissioning ceremony for the USS Montana, the Joes come under attack from Cobra, who recruits Hawk's old friend, Admiral George Lattimer, who is unwilling to let the Navy send his ship to the scrapheap. Destro has recruited Lattimer as a Cobra agent, planning to take out all other naval craft so the Montana is unrivalled. Lattimer angrily berates Destro for failing to provide escort forces for his powerful, but ageing battleship; vulnerable, he worries, to aerial attack. Destro mocks the admiral as a special Cobra 'Pulse Modulator' is winched aboard. Destro explains the electromagnetic pulses from this will disable all and any U.S. forces which try to attack the ship. Meanwhile, back at the Atlantic Fleet HQ, the top brass despatch a large air and sea force to sink the Montana, by any means necessary. She is, after all, too powerful to leave in Cobra hands. On making contact with the Montana, the Pulse Modulator works as Destro predicted and all land and sea units attacking lose power, stopping dead in the water or dropping from the sky. Hawk and the team have to quickly improvise a highly unusual and completely unauthorised plan to overcome both the Cobra B.A.T.s and the Pulse Modulator, in order to bring the Montana to heel. Note: The 'USS Montana' which forms the centrepiece of the action is possibly a reference to the cancelled Montana-class battleship, a mooted successor class to the Iowa-class battleships planned during World War II but cancelled before the war concluded. The USS Constitution, however, is a real ship - though there is no evidence it could be airlifted into a naval engagement using rotary-wing aircraft as suggested in the cartoon.
74	9	"Let's Play Soldier"	Ray Lee	Sharman Divono	September 30, 1986	600-60
The Joes raid a village in southeast Asia to prevent villagers from collecting tree sap for Cobra. During the mission, Leatherneck has an encounter with four street orphans. Note: In this episode Beach Head is voiced by Dan Gilvezan instead of William Callaway.
75	10	"Once Upon a Joe"	Ray Lee	Buzz Dixon	October 1, 1986	600-64
When Cobra Strato-Vipers attempt to steal the MacGuffin Device but are stopped by G.I. Joe, the battle takes out an orphanage, which the Joes begin to rebuild. Now, the Joes must prevent this device from falling into Cobra's evil hands while Shipwreck tells the children a story about Joe members re-imagined as comical dwarfed versions who seek to find a hamburger mine. Meanwhile, Zartan has been hired to try and steal the device, disguised as Shipwreck. But Shipwreck turns the tide using the device, powered by his own comical creations. Note: The MacGuffin Device is actually a MacGuffin itself. The term MacGuffin refers to any object, device, or event that is necessary to the plot and the motivation of the characters, but insignificant, unimportant, or irrelevant in itself. The term was originated by Angus MacPhail for film, adopted by Alfred Hitchcock, and later extended to a similar device in other fiction.
76	11	"The Million Dollar Medic"	Ray Lee	Carla Conway and Gerry Conway	October 2, 1986	600-62
In the Joe/Cobra battle in the Caribbean, a civilian yacht is sunk. But the Joes save the day. The heiress Brittany Van Mark falls for Lifeline who helped her recover. Serpentor wants to claim the business of Owen Van Mark and sends Baroness, Tomax, and Xamot to capture Bree in order to make Owen Van Mark sell his company.
77	12	"Cobrathon"	Ray Lee	Rebecca Parr and Martin Pasko	October 6, 1986	600-61
Cobra pirates airwaves and stages a telethon to raise funds for criminals and terrorists in order to delete all known terrorist activities from every international database in the world.
78	13	"The Rotten Egg"	Ray Lee	Steve Mitchell and Barbara Petty	October 7, 1986	600-63
Leatherneck attends graduation ceremonies at a new academy and discovers it run by dishonorably discharged soldier Buck McCann, now leader of Cobra's own Marine Corps.
79	14	"Glamour Girls"	Ray Lee	Beth Bornstein	October 8, 1986	600-65
Madame Vail and Cobra, through Extensive Enterprises, strike up a deal which requires Cobra to supply her with young women to reverse her aging process. In return, she'll fund Cobra. (This episode sees the return of Satin from "The Pyramid of Darkness" mini-series.)
80	15	"Iceberg Goes South"	Ray Lee	Mary Skrenes	October 9, 1986	600-66
Iceberg and the rest of the Joes are in an Arctic region training and testing new equipment.
81	16	"The Spy Who Rooked Me"	Ray Lee	Susan K. Williams	October 13, 1986	600-67
The Joes must work alongside English secret agent Matthew Burke to stop Cobra from obtaining a paralyzing gas. Turns out the entire operation was a double bluff; having counted on Zarana spying on the Joes Note: In this episode Hawk is voiced by John Stephenson instead of Ed Gilbert.
82	17	"Grey Hairs and Growing Pains"	Ray Lee	Story by : David Marconi and Flint Dille	October 14, 1986	600-68
The Joes set out to find the connection between Cobra and a special youth treatment that they stole from its rightful owner.
83	18	"My Brother's Keeper"	Ray Lee	Buzz Dixon	October 15, 1986	600-69
Sgt. Slaughter accompanies Sci-Fi to a science fiction convention, where Doctor Mindbender recruits a handicapped scientist named Dr. Jeremy Penser to perfect his latest weapon.
84	19	"My Favorite Things"	Ray Lee	Doug Booth	October 16, 1986	600-70
Wet Suit and Leatherneck must work together to stop Serpentor from stealing ancient relics from his former lives that would make him invincible. Note: In this episode General Hawk is played by both John Stephenson and Ed Gilbert in the same scene, where two different lines are said by the two actors.
85	20	"Raise the Flagg!"	Ray Lee	David Carren	October 20, 1986	600-71
G.I. Joe and Cobra mount separate salvage operations to recover the sunken U.S.S. Flagg, only to find a former Cobra agent named Lakar and reprogrammed BATs occupy the Flagg and renamed it Lakar City.
86	21	"Ninja Holiday"	Ray Lee	Michael Charles Hill	October 22, 1986	600-79
Cobra Commander plots to find an assassin that he needs to eliminate Serpentor.
87	22	"G.I. Joe and the Golden Fleece"	Ray Lee	Flint Dille; Teleplay by : Richard Merwin	October 27, 1986	600-72
Joe and Cobra forces race to capture a golden coil dropped from a UFO and the device sends them back in time to ancient Greece, where they are mistaken for deities. Sgt. Slaughter uses his knowledge of Greek Culture from college to aid Greek citizens in the fight against Cobra and help the Joes and Cobra return to the 20th century.
88	23	"The Most Dangerous Thing in the World"	Ray Lee	Buzz Dixon	October 28, 1986	600-78
While General Hawk was attending a NATO meeting, Cobra hacks into the Defense Department's computer system and upgrades Shipwreck, Dial-Tone, and Lifeline to the rank of Colonel. Though neither of the three are qualified; which is Cobra's plan to put the Joes in disarray.
89	24	"Nightmare Assault"	Ray Lee	Marv Wolfman	October 29, 1986	600-80
When Doctor Mindbender creates a machine that turns the Joes' dreams into nightmares, Lowlight is the only person who can help his friends overcome their fears and foil Mindbender's evil plot.
90	25	"Second Hand Emotions"	Ray Lee	Carla Conway and Gerry Conway	October 31, 1986	600-82
Doctor Mindbender constructs a musical instrument to influence the Joes' emotions. Meanwhile, Lifeline makes peace with his father who seems displeased with his son's career choice as a member of the Joes.
91	26	"Joe's Night Out"	Ray Lee	David Schwartz	November 10, 1986	600-81
Leatherneck, Wet Suit, and Dial-Tone visit a new nightclub which is a Cobra rocket in disguise, sending the trio to space. Serpentor plans to ransom the civilians or blow up the rocket.
92	27	"Not a Ghost of a Chance"	Ray Lee	Sharman Divono	November 13, 1986	600-83
Cobra is suspected of shooting down an experimental military jet and the Joes must prove that they are behind the attack.
93	28	"Sins of Our Fathers"	Ray Lee	Story by : Steve Gerber; Teleplay by : Buzz Dixon	November 18, 1986	600-84
Dial-Tone is dismissed from the Joe team and ends up helping Cobra Commander raise a monster from the ruins of Castle Destro in order to destroy Serpentor. Note: Destro's spoken chant in this episode is a backwards phrase that when back-masked reads "Anyone listening to this backwards for a secret occult message is a real dweeb!"
94	29	"In the Presence of Mine Enemies"	Ray Lee	Chris Weber and Karen Willson	November 19, 1986	600-85
When Slip-Stream is shot down by a female Strato-Viper near an abandoned Cobra laboratory, both hunt each other down.
95	30	"Into Your Tent I Will Silently Creep"	Ray Lee	Buzz Dixon and Charles Hill	November 20, 1986	600-86
Cross-Country tries to track down the theft of his tape deck and finds them being taken by a robotic rat, along with other Joes' personal items. Among them was a game program Mainframe and Dial-Tone were working on. This episode shows Cobra Commander founding The Coil, which was planned to be a major plot point of the third Sunbow season had they retained the license.

=== G.I. Joe: The Movie (1987) ===
G.I. Joe: The Movie is a 1987 animated feature film. It was released on home video on April 20, 1987, and later aired in syndication, both as a full-length film and as a series of five episodes. With detailed visuals in Toei Animation's typical animated feature film styling, the film has a decidedly darker tone than the television series. The plot revolves around the introduction of Cobra-La, and their plans to steal a device allowing them to transform all human life into serpent creatures. The film also reveals Cobra Commander's cartoon origin, and features the animated debuts of several members of the G.I. Joe Team, most notably Chuckles, Falcon, Law & Order, Jinx, Tunnel Rat and Mercer.

== DIC releases (1989–1992) ==
=== Miniseries (1989) ===
This miniseries uses a modified version of the Sunbow theme song.

No. overall	No. in season	Title	Written by	Original release date
1	1	"Operation Dragonfire: Day 1"	Doug Booth	September 4, 1989
Serpentor seizes control of the Dragonfire.
2	2	"Operation Dragonfire: Day 2"	Doug Booth	September 5, 1989
Cobra Commander is returned to human form by Baroness. Realizing its potential, Cobra Commander uses Dragonfire to fuse pythons with machines and troops to create the Python Patrol.
3	3	"Operation Dragonfire: Day 3"	Doug Booth	September 6, 1989
Cobra Commander finds the Dragonfire energy and Scoop finds out Cobra lied to him!
4	4	"Operation Dragonfire: Day 4"	Doug Booth	September 7, 1989
Cobra Commander regains control of Cobra in a coup (by Lowlight) over Serpentor. As punishment Serpentor is fused with an iguana.
5	5	"Operation Dragonfire: Day 5"	Doug Booth	September 8, 1989
The final battle between G.I. Joe and Cobra.

=== Season 1 (1990–1991) ===
No. overall	No. in season	Title	Directed by	Written by	Original release date	Prod. code
6	1	"United We Stand"	Jim Duffy; Chuck Patton	Tony Zalewski	September 25, 1990	TBA
Ambush and Pathfinder have to work together or perish!
7	2	"Revenge of the Pharaohs"	Jim Duffy; Chuck Patton	Ted Pedersen	September 26, 1990	TBA
A stolen artifact causes Night Creeper Leader to think he's a reincarnated Pharaoh, and has his sights set on Lady Jaye.
8	3	"Granny Dearest"	Jim Duffy; Chuck Patton	Chris Weber and Karen Wilson	September 27, 1990	TBA
When Metal-Head's granny visits, she's under the impression that Cobra is a security agency headed by her grandson. She inadvertently aids them, remaining blissfully unaware even when the Joes break up Cobra's latest scheme.
9	4	"Victory at Volcania, Part 1"	Jim Duffy; Chuck Patton	David B. Carren and J. Larry Carroll	October 1, 1990	TBA
Cobra attacks while the Joes are resting, and General Hawk questions his usefulness to G.I. Joe.
10	5	"Victory at Volcania, Part 2"	Jim Duffy; Chuck Patton	David B. Carren and J. Larry Carroll	October 2, 1990	TBA
Cobra has the Joes on the run, can Hawk rally for a victory?
11	6	"The Nozone Conspiracy"	Jim Duffy; Chuck Patton	Eric Early	October 4, 1990	TBA
Cobra decides to blackmail humanity into protecting itself from the Ozone.
12	7	"Pigskin Commandos"	Jim Duffy; Chuck Patton	Roger Slifer	October 8, 1990	TBA
Sgt. Slaughter is kidnapped and its up to Grid-Iron to save him.
13	8	"Cold Shoulder"	Jim Duffy; Chuck Patton	Craig Miller and Mark Nelson	October 10, 1990	TBA
G.I. Joe/Oktober Guard team up with Rampart and Cpt. Krimov to work on a space satellite while Sgt. Slaughter, Sub-Zero and Stretcher monitoring their movements, but Cobra wants it for themselves which leads to the satellite and 2 Joe team members being captured. It's up to Sub-Zero and Stretcher to save them while the Sarge backs them up along with their troops against Cobra's attacks.
14	9	"Injustice and the Cobra Way"	Jim Duffy; Chuck Patton	Flint Dille and Meg McLaughlin	October 11, 1990	TBA
There is a new hero in the world. Will G.I. Joe be forgotten?
15	10	"General Confusion"	Jim Duffy; Chuck Patton	Steven Greene	October 15, 1990	TBA
G.I. Joe's massive expenses come under review by the United States government.
16	11	"Night of the Creepers"	Jim Duffy; Chuck Patton	Rick Merwin	October 16, 1990	TBA
Lowlight and Scoop track the Night Creepers leader into an ancient city. Cobra Commander and Destro wish to use the mummified ancestors of the Night Creepers as an undead army to replace their vulnerable troops. However, the Night Creepers leader revives the king his ancestors worshipped, making everything more complicated.
17	12	"That's Entertainment"	Jim Duffy; Chuck Patton	George Caragonne	October 18, 1990	TBA
General Hawk becomes angered at the lax nature of his troops and their infatuation with a movie star.
18	13	"I Found You... Evy"	Jim Duffy; Chuck Patton	Sharman DiVono	October 22, 1990	TBA
Ambush reveals a story from his past, about the only person who has ever been able to find him....a female viper named Evy!
19	14	"An Officer and a Viperman"	Jim Duffy; Chuck Patton	Michael Charles Hill	October 24, 1990	TBA
Someone from G.I. Joe is leaking sensitive information. Pathfinder, Ambush, and Topside go undercover and join Cobra in order to find out whether there is a traitor in G.I. Joe.
20	15	"D-Day at Alcatraz, Part 1"	Jim Duffy; Chuck Patton	David B. Carren and J. Larry Carroll	November 5, 1990	TBA
Cobra is finally arrested and put in prison...but is there more to their capture?
21	16	"D-Day at Alcatraz, Part 2"	Jim Duffy; Chuck Patton	David B. Carren and J. Larry Carroll	November 6, 1990	TBA
Cobra has deceived the Joes and has captured the Comstock load, can Grid-Iron beat the odds and save the day?
22	17	"The Mind Mangler"	Jim Duffy; Chuck Patton	Christy Marx	November 8, 1990	TBA
Duke is captured by the Mind Mangler to reveal the location of the Joes base, can Sky Patrol save him?
23	18	"BIOK"	Jim Duffy; Chuck Patton	Christy Marx	February 11, 1991	TBA
BIOK a super computer of sorts decides to attack the Joes using their own weapons, can Sky Patrol defeat it?
24	19	"Stuck on You"	Jim Duffy; Chuck Patton	Steve Mitchell and Barbara Petty	February 13, 1991	TBA
Pathfinder and Cobra Commander attempt to escape a Jungle safely when both crash during a battle.

=== Season 2 (1991–1992) ===
A notable change this season is that Cobra Commander goes back to using his hooded uniform, abandoning the armored uniform introduced in the "Dragonfire" miniseries.

No. overall	No. in season	Title	Directed by	Written by	Original release date	Prod. code
25	1	"The Eliminator"	John Grusd	Sandra Ryan	September 23, 1991	TBA
When sensitive information is leaked, can Mercer convince the Joes he is not a traitor?
26	2	"Chunnel"	John Grusd	Tony Zalewski	September 24, 1991	TBA
Cobra Commander kidnaps the Queen of the United Kingdom; can Duke save her in time?
27	3	"The Sword"	John Grusd	Ted Pedersen and Steve Hayes	September 25, 1991	TBA
Snake Eyes and Storm Shadow race against the clock to beat the Night Creeper's leader to a magical sword.
28	4	"El Dorado - The Lost City of Gold"	John Grusd	Phil Harnage	September 30, 1991	TBA
Grunt discovers the Lost City of Gold. Will Cobra soon follow?
29	5	"Kindergarten Commandos"	John Grusd	Eric Early	October 1, 1991	TBA
Cobra Commander wants the perfect soldier. Can Mercer stop his evil plan?
30	6	"Long Live Rock and Roll, Part I"	John Grusd	Doug Booth	October 2, 1991	TBA
Cobra creates a sonic attack that can cripple an entire city. G.I. Joe has to stop them.
31	7	"Long Live Rock and Roll, Part II"	John Grusd	Doug Booth	October 3, 1991	TBA
Rock N Roll and Snake Eyes race to save the city against Cobra's sonic attacks.
32	8	"The Sludge Factor, Part 1"	John Grusd	Phil Harnage	October 7, 1991	TBA
Cobra attacks a chemical plant and causes an environmental disaster, while also stealing the world's supply of food.
33	9	"The Sludge Factor, Part 2"	John Grusd	Phil Harnage	October 8, 1991	TBA
Cesspool joins up with Cobra but has different intentions.
34	10	"Messenger from the Deep"	John Grusd	Marv Wolfman and Noel Watkins	October 14, 1991	TBA
G.I. Joe discovers an ancient underwater city, but Cobra is hot on their heels.
35	11	"The Greatest Evil, Part 1"	John Grusd	Bob and Eve Forward	October 21, 1991	TBA
The Headman has the city in his grips with drugs, and he gets Falcon hooked.
36	12	"The Greatest Evil, Part 2"	John Grusd	Bob and Eve Forward	October 22, 1991	TBA
G.I. Joe and Cobra have teamed up take down the Headman. Can they rescue Falcon in time?
37	13	"Infested Island"	John Grusd	Martha Moran	October 28, 1991	TBA
Cesspool has a new plan to bring humanity to his feet...by turning everyone into bugs!
38	14	"A is for Android"	John Grusd	Sandra Ryan	October 29, 1991	TBA
General Hawk has a clone, and the Joes have to figure out which General Hawk is real.
39	15	"Shadow of a Doubt"	John Grusd	Michael Charles Hill	November 6, 1991	TBA
Cobra Commander is imprisoned and Storm Shadow helps him escape, has Storm Shadow become a traitor?
40	16	"Keyboard Warriors"	John Grusd	Misty Taggart	November 12, 1991	TBA
Cobra's computers are infiltrated by a young computer hacker who thinks it's a video game.
41	17	"Cobra World"	John Grusd	Tony Zalewski	November 14, 1991	TBA
Cobra buys an amusement park. Has Cobra turned good?
42	18	"Metal Head's Reunion"	John Grusd	Steve Weiss and Paul Dell	November 19, 1991	TBA
There is a High School Reunion for Captain Grid-Iron and Metal-Head. But Metal-Head wants to make sure he is remembered.
43	19	"Basic Training"	John Grusd	Phil Harnage	January 7, 1992	TBA
Recap episode detailing events of Season 1 (a little part of season 1) and Season 2 and the life of a G.I. Joe, as hosted by General Hawk.
44	20	"The Legend of Metal Head"	John Grusd	Phil Harnage	January 20, 1992	TBA
Recap episode detailing Metal-Head's time in the DIC series.

== Notes ==
- In 1994, the G.I. Joe brand was relaunched under the Sgt. Savage and his Screaming Eagles banner. One version of the Sgt. Savage action figure included a VHS tape of a single cartoon episode (again produced by Sunbow) introducing the new storyline. General Hawk, Lady Jaye, Doc, and Cobra Commander made appearances in this cartoon.
