= Zanzibar (G.I. Joe) =

G.I. Joe character

- G.I. Joe character
- Illustration of Zanzibar from G.I. Joe: Order of Battle. Art by Herb Trimpe.
- First appearance: G.I. Joe: A Real American Hero issue #60 (June 1987)

In-universe information
- Affiliation: Dreadnoks
- Specialty: Pirate
- File name: Morgan Teach
- Birth place: Cayman Islands

Zanzibar is a fictional character from the G.I. Joe: A Real American Hero toyline and comic book series. He is affiliated with Cobra as the Dreadnoks' pirate and debuted in 1987.

== Profile ==
His real name is Morgan Teach (a reference to two real life pirates Admiral Henry Morgan and Blackbeard). Zanzibar was born in the Cayman Islands.

Zanzibar grew up on a garbage scow, spending his youth picking pockets on crowded piers. He later engaged in river piracy, stock fraud and smuggling, but did not like the work he had to put into these activities and wanted something more nasty. Zanzibar was immediately made a Dreadnok, when he brought a load of bootleg gasoline to sell at Zartan's filling station. However, due to his selfishness, penchant for stealing and poor personal hygiene, his disposition is so nasty that even the other Dreadnoks don't like him.

Zanzibar overplays the role of a pirate, raiding waterways aboard his air skiff, and even speaking with an excess of bluster. Zartan keeps him on retainer, mostly to keep an eye on him. Many of the Dreadnoks also suspect that his eyepatch is simply for show.

== Toys ==
Zanzibar was first released as an action figure in 1987, packaged with the Dreadnok Air Skiff. A second version was released in 2004 as a G.I. Joe convention exclusive repaint of the first figure. A third version was released in an exclusive 7 pack Dreadnok set in Dec 2011.

== Comics ==
Cover of G.I. Joe: A Real American Hero #60. Art by Mike Zeck.

=== Marvel Comics ===
In the Marvel Comics G.I. Joe series, he first appeared in G.I. Joe: A Real American Hero #60 (June 1987). He and Monkeywrench are caught stealing bad gasoline from Zartan, the same gas he sold the Cobra agent in the first place. He has some knowledge that helps save Cobra Island from a missile attack arranged by rogue Pentagon agents.

He appears again in issue #89, as part of a multi-Cobra/Dreadnok effort to chase down Clutch and Rock 'n Roll. His "Pogo" craft is run-down by the damaged G.I. Joe vehicle "Mean Dog", and he is captured by Repeater, Wildcard and Hardball.

=== Devil's Due ===
He makes a cameo in the Devil's Due Joe series as Cobra prepares to go to war against Serpentor. He is a supporting character in two flashback issues showing Dreadnok business. He helps recruit new members and is seen on an assault mission on rivals who don't show the proper respect.

=== IDW ===
In the 2016, Zanzibar is a loyal soldier of the Dreadnoks, under Crystal Ball. They have managed to overtake vital territory in Mongolia. The Chinese ask the G.I. Joe team to come in to root out the Dreadnoks.

== Books ==
Zanzibar is featured in the G.I. Joe tie-in novel 'Invisibility Island'.

== Other works ==
Zanzibar's figure is briefly featured in the fiction novel 6 Sick Hipsters. In the story, the character Paul Achting spent four years collecting G.I. Joe figures to set up a battle scene between the Joes and Cobra. As he imagined the characters in his head, he described the Dreadnoks as "an elite team of maniacal mercenaries allied with Cobra for this battle", with the figures lying in the thick of the shag carpet, and "Toward the edge of the carpet, nearest the closet, Zanzibar, the dread pirate who never changed his socks and brushed his teeth with grape soda, was mounted on the Air Skiff, an over water swamp vehicle that functioned surprisingly well on the thick shag rug".
