= G.I. Joe: A Real American Hero (1989 TV series) =

1989–1992 American animated television series

- Genre: Military science fiction
- Created by: Hasbro
- Based on: G.I. Joe: A Real American Hero by Hasbro
- Developed by: Doug Booth (miniseries, seasons 1–2); Martha Moran (season 2)
- Directed by: Michael Maliani (miniseries); Jim Duffy (season 1); Chuck Patton (season 1); John Grusd (season 2)
- Voices of: Garry Chalk; Suzanne Errett-Balcom; Marcy Goldberg; Ted Harrison; David Kaye; Maurice LaMarche; Chris Latta; Morgan Lofting; Scott McNeil; Bob Remus; Dale Wilson
- Narrated by: Jackson Beck (Operation Dragonfire mini-series only)
- Country of origin: United States
- Original language: English
- No. of seasons: 2
- No. of episodes: 44 (list of episodes)

Production
- Executive producers: Andy Heyward; Robby London
- Running time: 22 minutes
- Production companies: DIC Enterprises; Claster Television; Sunbow Productions

Original release
- Network: First-run syndication
- Release: September 4, 1989 – January 20, 1992

G.I. Joe: A Real American Hero is a 1989–1992 half-hour American animated television series based on the toyline from Hasbro. The series was produced by DIC Enterprises.

== Background ==
"Narrator: G.I. Joe, America's top secret mobile strike force team. [YO JOE!] Narrator: The mission: to defend freedom. [YO JOE!] Narrator: The threat: Cobra, an evil organization bent on world conquest. [YO JOE!] Narrator: The battle cry. [YO JOE!]

— opening intro from the DiC series.

The series debuted in 1989, with a five-part mini-series titled Operation: Dragonfire, in which Cobra Commander is returned to human form. The regular series began in 1990, lasting for two seasons and 44 episodes. The series continued the original G.I. Joe animated series produced by Sunbow Productions and Marvel Productions that ran in syndication from 1983 to 1986.

In order to cut production costs for the original animated series, Hasbro dropped Sunbow and contracted DiC to continue the series. Story editor Buzz Dixon explained in an interview: "Hasbro had been funding G.I. Joe out of their own pocket; they got a ridiculous deal from DiC to take over the series and they pretty much let them."

The DiC series is a continuation of the Sunbow show, though it chose to focus primarily on new characters of the period. Hawk was retained as G.I. Joe commander, and at times shared his duties with Sgt. Slaughter as head of the G.I. Joe Team. Captain Grid-Iron was given field commander duties in Season 1, with Duke regaining his old position and appearing more often in Season 2. Storm Shadow was also now a member of G.I. Joe, as action figures of the character had been sold as a Joe rather than a Cobra since 1988, keeping in line with the story of the comics, where he had abandoned Cobra in 1986–87.

The first season centered almost exclusively on the 1990 Joes; meanwhile, Cobra, having a less extensive cast, was augmented by select characters from 1989 and the yet-to-be-released 1991 figures. This new ensemble had a much wider variety of Cobra forces, with viewers being introduced to the Night Creepers and many different forms of Vipers. One of the more noticeable changes to Cobra is that Destro has returned, now wearing a gold mask (instead of silver) and wears a uniform with a shoulder gauntlet. Arthur Burghardt did not return to reprise the Destro voice role, thus Destro's voice was one of several acted by Maurice LaMarche.

The first season of the DiC series was mainly standalone episodes that focused on establishing new team members and plots. After the "Operation Dragonfire" miniseries, the DiC show lowered the animation budget and began a series of two part episodes, which often told a deeper story involving more dramatic life and death situations for the Joes. The theme song called "Got to get tough... Yo Joe!" and underscore for both seasons were provided by Stephen James Taylor.

Also a casualty of the animation company changeover was the extensive voice cast Sunbow employed, which largely consisted of voice actors employed by West Coast American companies. Because the DiC series was produced in Canada, an almost entirely new cast was assembled. Only a few actors from the Sunbow series returned for the DIC series; Sgt. Slaughter, Chris Latta (the voice of Cobra Commander), Ed Gilbert (Hawk), Jerry Houser (Sci-Fi) and Morgan Lofting (Baroness). With Season 2, Chris Latta was the only voice actor to return, and the Baroness and Hawk were recast with new voices.

== Summary ==
After the events of G.I. Joe: The Movie, a much reduced Cobra continues to be led by Serpentor. Destro dumps the Baroness in favor of Zarana and so the Baroness turns on Destro and Serpentor to get revenge. She restores Cobra Commander to a humanoid form, who proceeds to depose Serpentor and reestablish his alliance with Destro in exchange for the arms dealer dumping Zarana. With that, Cobra renews its offensive against G.I. Joe, now consisting of a new generation of Joes led by Sgt. Slaughter and Hawk. Gnawgahyde and Metal-Head serve as Cobra Commander's main lackeys, with Destro and Baroness taking less part in field operations.

== Cast ==
- Jackson Beck – Narrator ("Operation Dragonfire" mini-series)
- Michael Benyaer – Airwave, Scoop
- Don Brown – Sub-Zero, Mutt (in "The Greatest Evil"), Crimson Guard Immortal (in "The Greatest Evil")
- Jim Byrnes – Alley Viper, Rimpoche ("Operation Dragonfire" mini-series), Narrator (Seasons 1 and 2 intro sequences)
- Garry Chalk – Pathfinder, Shockwave, Gristle, Metal-Head, BIOK, Road Pig
- Brent Chapman – Red Star, Salvo
- Christopher Collins – Cobra Commander
- Lisa Corps – Lady Jaye ("Operation Dragonfire" mini-series), Zarana, Range Viper #3/Evy (in "I Found You... Evy")
- Kevin Conway – Rock 'n Roll, Dusty, José Riviera
- Ian James Corlett – Rampart, Gnawgahyde, Billy Blaster
- Suzanne Errett-Balcom – Lady Jaye (Season 1), Scarlett
- Ed Gilbert – General Hawk (Season 1)
- Marcy Goldberg – Baroness (Season 2)
- Ted Harrison – Duke
- Phil Hayes – Airborne, Tracker, Cloudburst
- Jerry Houser – Sci-Fi
- Lee Jeffrey – Stalker
- David Kaye – General Hawk (Season 2)
- Terry Klassen – Topside
- Andrew Koenig – Ambush (Season 1), Night Creeper Leader (Season 1), Cobra Troopers
- Maurice LaMarche – Big Ben, Flint, Low-Light, Mercer, Psyche-Out, Spirit, Copperhead, Destro, Skydive, Serpentor, Wet-Suit, Night Creeper Leader (Season 2)
- Morgan Lofting – Baroness ("Operation Dragonfire" mini-series and Season 1)
- Scott McNeil – Freefall, Skymate, Storm Shadow, Dice, Headman, Lt. Falcon, Slice
- Bob Remus – Sgt. Slaughter
- Robert O. Smith – Grunt
- William Taylor – Heavy Duty
- David Wills – Bullhorn
- Dale Wilson – Captain Grid-Iron, Mutt (Operation Dragonfire), Overkill, Drop Zone

=== Additional voices ===
- Mark Acheson – Range Viper #1 (in "I Found You... Evy")
- Jay Brazeau – Cesspool
- Babz Chula – Metal-Head's Granny
- Tom Davidson
- Michael Donovan – Big Bear
- Fred Henderson – Ozone
- Gary Jones
- Annabel Kershaw – Fiona Diamond
- Victoria Langston
- Lalainia Lindberg
- Blu Mankuma – Roadblock, Guardian of El Dorado (in "El Dorado: The Lost City of Gold")
- Shane Meier – Jesse (in "Cobra World")
- Pauline Newstone – President Mason (in "Injustice and the Cobra Way"), Zarana (in "Injustice and the Cobra Way")
- John Novak – Range-Viper (in "Pigskin Commandos")
- Doug Parker – Dragon Emperor (in "Night of the Creepers")
- Derek Peakman
- Margot Pinvidic – Dr. Suzanne Winters (in "Metal-Head's Reunion")
- Rick Poltaruk – Laser-Viper (in "Injustice and the Cobra Way")
- Alvin Sanders – Stretcher, Bullet-Proof, Static-Line
- Tomm Wright – Sandstorm

== Crew ==
- Madeleine Bascom - Voice Director (season 1-2)
- Marsha Goodman - Voice Director (in "Operation: Dragonfire"), Casting
- Ginny McSwain - Voice Director (in "Operation: Dragonfire")
- Doug Parker - Voice Director (season 1)
- Paul Quinn (season 1-2)
- Victor Villegas - Voice Director (in "Operation: Dragonfire")

== Home media ==
=== VHS ===
Select episodes of the series were released on VHS. The first tape, "Revenge of the Pharaoh", was released in 1990 by Hasbro packaged with an action figure of G.I. Joe member Rapid-Fire, who was named after DiC executive Robby London. Buena Vista Home Video later distributed a series of three VHS tapes in 1992, each containing a single episode.

- Revenge of the Pharaoh (packaged with "Rapid-Fire" action figure)
- El Dorado: Lost City of Gold
- Chunnel
- Infested Island

=== DVD ===
After releasing the entire Sunbow series on DVD, Shout! Factory and Vivendi Entertainment subsequently released the entire DiC series. G.I. Joe: A Real American Hero Series 2, Season 1 was released on January 10, 2012, and Season 2 was released on July 10, 2012.

DVD name	Ep #	Release date
Season 1	24	January 10, 2012
Season 2	20	July 10, 2012

== See also ==
- G.I. Joe
- G.I. Joe: A Real American Hero
- G.I. Joe: A Real American Hero (1983 TV series)
- G.I. Joe (comics)
- G.I. Joe Extreme
- G.I. Joe: Renegades
- G.I. Joe: Sigma 6
- G.I. Joe: The Movie
