= Destro =

Fictional character from the G.I. Joe franchise

- G.I. Joe character
- Destro; detail from the cover of G.I. Joe, A Real American Hero #49 (July, 1986), Marvel Comics. Art by Mike Zeck.
- First appearance: 1983
- Voiced by: Arthur Burghardt (Sunbow); Maurice LaMarche (DiC series); Scott McNeil (Spy Troops & Valor vs. Venom); Marc Thompson (Sigma 6); Eric Bauza (Resolute); Clancy Brown (Renegades); Christopher Eccleston (G.I. Joe: The Rise of Cobra); Uncredited extra (G.I. Joe: Retaliation); Isaac C. Singleton Jr. (Community); Gavin Hammon (G.I. Joe: Operation Blackout)

In-universe information
- Affiliation: Cobra
- Specialty: Weapons Supplier; Founder of M.A.R.S. Industry
- File name: Destro XXIV; James McCullen
- Birth place: Callander, Perthshire, Scotland
- Primary MOS: Weapons manufacturer
- Secondary MOS: Terrorist
- Subgroups: Iron Grenadiers

Laird James McCullen Destro XXIV, usually referred to simply as Destro, is a fictional character from the G.I. Joe: A Real American Hero toyline, comic books, and cartoon series. He is the Scottish leader of the Iron Grenadiers, and founder of weapons manufacturer M.A.R.S. Industries, a supplier for Cobra. Destro is portrayed by Christopher Eccleston in the 2009 live-action film G.I. Joe: The Rise of Cobra, and by an uncredited extra in its 2013 sequel G.I. Joe: Retaliation.

== Profile ==
Born in Callander, Scotland, Destro is laird of the Castle Destro in the Scottish Highlands. The Destro clan has designed and sold weapons for centuries. Destro heads their current incarnation—M.A.R.S. (Military Armament Research Syndicate), a weapons manufacturer and one of the largest multinational corporations in the world. As a businessman, Destro is cutthroat and unyielding. He maintains apartments or office buildings in most major cities of the world. His lifestyle outdoes most oil sheiks or shipping magnates. Destro was an early investor in Macau and has other potentially lucrative speculative real estate holdings in developing areas of the world. War is his business and passion; Destro believes in the spoils of war and the vast wealth M.A.R.S. provides. He hires mercenaries to stir up conflict in dangerous regions, then provides high-tech arms to any side able to meet his price. Continuing a tradition started by the first Destro, he will even sell to both sides of the same war.

Destro's key characteristics are his sense of honor, a calm demeanor, and love for Cobra's second-in-command, the Baroness. He wears a mask forged from beryllium steel, a tradition dating back to the Wars of the Three Kingdoms, when an ancestor of his was caught by Cromwell's men in the act of selling weapons to both sides. Forced to wear a steel mask for his crimes (neither side wanted to execute the ancestor because they still wanted the weapons he sold), the Destro clan has since turned it into a symbol of pride, passing it down from father to son for over 20 generations. He also wears on a neck chain his family crest bearing an ancient Scottish emblem symbolizing absolute power. Destro will sometimes enter battle himself, either as a member of Cobra Command, or against them if it is better for business. He respects the G.I. Joe Team for their combat skills, but detests them for wasting their skills to maintain peace. Destro and Cobra Commander despise each other, but maintain an alliance of convenience. Although twice the tactician and three times the soldier of Cobra Commander, Destro's sense of honor works to his disadvantage in the face of Cobra Commander's ruthlessness.

== Toys ==
=== A Real American Hero toy line ===
Destro was first released as an action figure in 1983, as a part of the second series of 3 3/4" G.I. Joe: A Real American Hero figures. This initial version featured a silver, vacuum-metalized head. In 1988, a second version was produced, this time with a gold vac-metalized head. This figure was released as part of the Iron Grenadiers faction, and the new mask symbolized his change in allegiance. A third figure of Destro followed in 1992, once again featuring his silver mask, this time painted instead of chromed. In 1993, a Star Brigade version of Destro was included in the Armor-Tech wave (again with a vac-metalized head). The same year, Hasbro revisited the long-dormant 12" G.I. Joe action figure scale, featuring the characters from "A Real American Hero". Destro was included in the 1993 series, packaged with a removable helmet that revealed his face underneath.

Hasbro and Toys "R" Us created a 15th Anniversary line in 1997, where Destro was released as part of the Cobra Command 3-pack. The pack was intended to feature the original 1983 mold of Destro but it had been lost by this time, forcing Hasbro to use the bulkier 1992 figure instead, in a variety of different color combinations. The same figure was repainted once more (in a more traditional color scheme) in 2001, when Hasbro expanded the line to the mass market.

In 2002, Hasbro relaunched the G.I. Joe “A Real American Hero” toyline for its 20th anniversary, and a new Destro figure was included in the initial wave. This Destro has a radically different uniform, and his face is molded with an open mouth and bared teeth.

=== Spy Troops ===
For 2003's Spy Troops, another new Destro was created, this time featuring him in a casual sweater and trousers, with the chromed steel mask returning. A 12" version of Destro was also released for the Spy Troops sub-line. Another Destro was released in 2004, in the "Valor vs Venom" sub-line, which returned Destro to his classic military look, but with a different color scheme. Repainting of the 1992 Destro has continued in the comic book 3-packs released in 2004–06, with a new head mold based on his comic appearance in Marvel #24.

=== Sigma 6 ===
Destro is also included in the 8" Sigma 6 toyline. The figure is clad in Cobra blue, with a red collar reminiscent of the 1983 toy, and a vac-metalized head mold. A repainted "Crime Boss" version of this figure was released shortly before the line's demise in 2007.

=== 25th Anniversary ===
Hasbro created two boxed sets of figures, featuring modern sculpting and increased articulation (including the replacement of G.I. Joe's trademark O-Ring construction). Destro was included in the inaugural Cobra set, along with Cobra Commander, Baroness, Storm Shadow, and a Cobra Trooper. This figure was later re-released individually. For the 2007 San Diego Comic Con, Hasbro repainted Destro in the color scheme of the ultra-rare 1997 "Pimp Daddy" Destro figure. Two versions of this figure were made: one had the traditional silver mask head while the other had the Iron Grenadier-themed gold mask. As part of the Comic Pack line, the figure was released again, this time with a blueish silver/dark blue color scheme that resembles Destro's first appearance in the Marvel series, as well as a vac-metal head. He came packaged with the G.I. Joe soldier Breaker and a copy of G.I. Joe #14.

In 2008, a new version of the Iron Grenadier Destro was released. Using a new mold, it was released as a single-card figure. A blueish-tinted variant, representing the coloration of the original Marvel comic version, was released in a comic-book set with an Iron Grenadier figure and an original comic book. There was also a variant with this figure, which was a black head for Destro.

=== G.I. Joe Classified Series ===
2020 saw the release of the G.I. Joe Classified Series, a new line of highly articulated 6-inch scale action figures that includes prominent characters like Destro. This line features premium deco, detailing, articulation, and classic design updated to bring the classic characters into the modern era, plus accessories inspired by each character's rich history.

== Comic series ==
=== Marvel Comics (1982–1994) ===
In the comic book continuity, Destro fancies himself an honorable man, answering to a moral code he alone seems to understand. He has stood with the Commander as often as he has opposed him but will join forces with the G.I. Joe team if it is good for business. With such wavering loyalties, he has come to respect and befriend many characters, from Joe members Flint and Lady Jaye, to the Baroness, and even the Commander's estranged son Billy. However, Destro's strongest connection is to the Baroness. It is revealed that they have had a romantic relationship since before the comic begins.

Destro first appears in the Marvel Comics series G.I. Joe: A Real American Hero #11, although his face is not seen. He is Cobra Commander's hired "specialist", sent to stop the G.I. Joe team from ruining their operation on the Alaskan Pipeline. Although Destro manages to stay two steps ahead of the Joes, his confrontation with Doc results in the Joes getting the antidote for a plague with which they had been infected, and turning the tables on Cobra. His first full appearance reveals his name and establishes his true intentions: he plans to remove the Commander and lead Cobra himself, with the Baroness at his side. However, Cobra Commander suspects this betrayal and recruits Major Bludd to kill Destro. A night operation in Washington, DC, gives Bludd his chance, but when the Baroness (who is driving Bludd's HISS tank) realizes what he is planning, she swerves sharply, overturning the tank and setting it on fire. The tank explodes, seemingly killing her, and this leaves Destro utterly distraught. Cobra Commander uses this circumstance to direct Destro's rage toward Bludd, and operates for a period without concern about Destro's treachery. However, when Cobra Commander is captured by G.I. Joe, Destro swiftly assumes control. At this point the Baroness returns and reveals the Commander's part in her fiery crash.

After a battle in the Everglades, Destro, Wild Weasel, and Firefly are stranded, with only their wiles to evade the G.I. Joe team and return to Cobra's hometown, Springfield. Destro has repeated conflicts with the Joes, including a fist fight with Cutter. When they finally arrive in Springfield, however, Baroness reveals that she and Bludd have recruited a young boy to assassinate the Commander during a Cobra rally. During the ceremony, Destro spots the trained killer and realizes it is Cobra Commander's son, Billy. Saving the man he swore to kill, Destro reveals a new side of himself: that of an honorable man who cannot condone patricide, even against a hated foe.

Destro heads the tribunal that questions Billy and later tries to stop Storm Shadow from helping the boy escape. After the creation of Cobra Island, Destro and the Baroness meet with the curious Doctor Mindbender, as he demonstrates a bio-weapon to them (quick-growing vines that spew knock out gas). Although the vines are defeated by Lady Jaye and a team of G.I. Joe trainees, they bring Doctor Mindbender to Cobra, where his true plans are put into effect. With the Commander's consent and Destro's help, Doctor Mindbender collects the bodies of history's ten greatest warriors, which are used to create a new villain, Serpentor. Serpentor is quickly recruited to fight a holding action against G.I. Joe, while Destro coordinates a complete evacuation of Springfield. Once the citizens of the small town are safe, Destro again shows his honorable side, rescuing Serpentor and the defenders.

Assaulting the Pit under Ft. Wadsworth, Staten Island, Cobra Commander becomes indignant at Serpentor and his successful campaign to take Cobra as his own. Cobra Commander leads a team of troops into the subterranean base, and Destro chooses to join him. When the defenders detonate The Pit's lowest levels, Cobra Commander and Destro are trapped underneath tons of rubble. The Commander becomes unhinged, but Destro applies reasoning and uncovers an earth-boring machine that saves their lives. Traveling across country in disguise, they are reunited with Billy, who is in a coma after his car was exploded by the Cobra agent Scrap-Iron (by orders of Firefly). Watching the Commander grieve for his misdeeds, Destro decides to exit the Cobra organization, returning to Scotland to reclaim his family's legacy. However, on arrival, he is greeted by a doppelganger and thrown in prison. With the intervention of Lady Jaye and Flint, Destro overthrows the imposter, revealed to be Major Bludd.

Destro later resurfaces as the leader of his own organization, the Iron Grenadiers. After inciting a war in Sierra Gordo, he takes part in the Cobra Island Civil War. He and his Grenadiers invade the island and confront Serpentor's forces. Destro requests that Serpentor release the capture Baroness. With the Baroness returns to Destro, he and his forces withdraw from the island. Displaying his sense of honor, Destro helps blackmail a pair of politicians who are trying to blame G.I. Joe for aiding Serpentor in the Civil War.

Content to stay out of the ongoing war between G.I. Joe and Cobra, Destro is nonetheless made a target by Cobra Commander II, and Castle Destro is assaulted by Cobra. Regardless, Destro overpowers the fake Commander and effectively takes over Cobra. Destro unveils an intricate plan of checks and balances to keep the Cobra High Command and his Iron Grenadiers on even footing. The Baroness discovers that Snake Eyes was the soldier she believed shot her brother Eugene in Southeast Asia. Waging an ill-advised personal vendetta, she ensnares Snake Eyes and Storm Shadow in the New York City Cobra Consulate Building which is ruined in the ensuing battle. As the roof collapses and the three are about the plummet to their death, Destro arrives by helicopter. He reveals that not only was he in Southeast Asia that day with his father, but that Snake Eyes was innocent of killing Eugene. Taking his lover away, he removes his mask for her, and the two retire for a time, while the Baroness puts her life back together.

Once Destro abandons Cobra, the original Cobra Commander returns. He locks most of his old lackeys in a freighter and buries it under the volcano on Cobra Island. Among the victims are Zartan and Billy, but they manage to dig themselves out, as does Firefly. Because of Destro's sense of honorable character, they go to him for refuge. At the same time, the Commander (still seeking revenge on his old associates) assaults and destroys Castle Destro. Because of his spy in Cobra, Metal-Head, Destro manages to escape from the castle, aided by G.I. Joe agent Chuckles, and the Commander puts a bounty on Destro.

Now a marked man, Destro teams with Billy and Zartan to rescue the Baroness, who is captured by Cobra in the raid. Joining with the G.I. Joe Ninja Force, the former Cobras break into the Night Creepers' citadel and begin emptying Cobra bank accounts. To save his fortunes, Cobra Commander agrees to call off the bounty on Destro, return the Baroness to Destro, and provide him with a new castle.

The new castle, Silent Castle in Trans-Carpathia, is where Slice and Dice have assembled the remaining Red Ninjas. With G.I. Joe guarding the Castle and Cobra arriving to activate the subliminal suggestions the Commander implanted in the Baroness while she was his prisoner, a four-way war breaks out, in the middle of which, Destro reveals the secret duality of the castle. Keeping his promise to the Baroness that he would love her so long as Castle Destro stands, he transforms the castle into a duplicate of his Scottish home, and the Baroness's love for him breaks the Commander's hold. Routing Cobra and the ninjas, the couple are left alone once more.

Later, Cobra Commander decides that he wants to move from Cobra Island and reclaim the Destro's castle. On the run from a Cobra invasion, Destro and Baroness contact G.I. Joe for an extraction. Snake Eyes and Storm Shadow come to their rescue, but not before Destro sets the transformation controls to create a nightmare of architecture, and confronts Scarlett (posing as a traitor). On the rooftop, Snake Eyes preserves her cover by injuring her with his sword (narrowly missing her heart), allowing the escape. Destro tries to give thanks for the rescue, but he is silently rebuffed by Snake Eyes, who resents having been put in such a position.

Afterwards, General Hawk takes Destro and Baroness to Cobra Island, where they are reunited with Zartan, who warns them all of the inevitable return of Dr. Mindbender. With the Commander fighting G.I. Joe in Millville, Destro, Baroness, and Zartan retake the Trans-Carpathian castle. Billy joins them, and the small group is reunited. When Dr. Mindbender is revived, he reveals that he placed a brain implant into Destro's mind during the removal of a wisdom tooth. Zartan also has one, and Cobra Commander's unmasked face is the trigger that activates them. Cobra ventures once more to the castle, and the Commander removes his hood, turning Destro and Zartan to his side.

With Destro's superior tactical mind, Cobra begins a campaign that leaves them in control of Trans-Carpathia, Darklonia, and Borigia-Krazny/Marango. It is when they assault Wolkekukuckland that they come up against the G.I. Joe team, and the progress is halted. During the stalemate, Snake Eyes attacks the Silent Castle to rescue Storm Shadow, only to find that he, along with the Baroness and Billy, have been brainwashed to serve Cobra. The Joes escape Cobra and return to the US, only to be deactivated by the government. The series comes to a close, leaving Destro and the others under the thrall of Cobra Commander.

=== Devil's Due (2001–2008) ===
In “The Mission That Never Was”, it is revealed that the core G.I. Joe members were sent on one final mission, which resulted in Cobra's Brainwave Scanner being corrupted by a virus that spread through the entirety of their mainframe. Crippled and defeated, Cobra then fell to a "unified military attack" (Note: This attack is never detailed in a story, but there are hints in various “Battle Files” entries.) A happy side effect of this confluence of events was the incapacitation of the Brainwave Scanner. Without repeated "self-medication" via the Scanner, the Baroness was freed from her artificial loyalty to Cobra. It is left ambiguous as to how Destro overcame his brain implant (which was self-contained, and thus unaffected by the virus), but it is speculated that, as happened in the Silent Castle some time earlier, the couple's love can overcome any obstacle. They returned to Trans-Carpathia and retired from the intrigue and danger of Cobra, but continued to rebuild M.A.R.S. Industries, establishing an outpost in Scotland. During this time, Dr. Mindbender and Scrap-Iron both enjoyed productive employment with M.A.R.S. But at some point, James contracted a serious family illness, and was bed-ridden for a long time.

It is at this point that Destro's illegitimate son, Alexander, surfaces. Vulnerable in his weakened state, James accepts Alexander and gives him full run of the operation. Wanting to make his father proud, he usurps the Destro identity and recruits Lilian Osbourne (Mistress Armada) to lead his armies, as he does not possess his father's tactical genius. When James begins to recover from the illness, Destro injects him with an experimental nanite technology, which keeps him incapacitated. Destro then arranges for the Cobra Commander to learn of the nanites' existence. Thinking he's stealing them from the US government, the Commander devises an elaborate scheme to take control of the country. With newfound momentum, Cobra Commander begins contacting all his old allies and returns to the US.

Destro and the Baroness attend a meeting in Zartan's Florida compound, appearing to all as a couple on the outs. After listening, Destro and Lilian stage a coup and take the Commander prisoner. Using the nanites on the Commander and all the former Cobra agents except Zartan, Destro is able to secure his hold over the organization, and effect the reunification the Commander had hoped for. Manipulating all the members of Cobra, Destro unleashes the nanites on the United States, very nearly taking over. It is only because of the intervention of the G.I. Joe team (who were reinstated when the Commander returned to U.S. soil), and Cobra Commander (who was freed from the prison by Storm Shadow, and cured of the nanites) that Destro fails in his bid for domination. When the nanites are defeated, the real Destro is freed from his paralyzed state just in time to greet Alex and Lilian, who are imprisoned after the Baroness rescues them from their losing battle.

Back in control, Destro is forced to make restitution to Cobra for his son's transgressions. Offering the Commander an explanation for the doppelganger as well as the hi-tech Destro family helmet that aided Alex in his deception, Destro agrees to work with Cobra until such time that he feels the debt is paid. Soon after this, the Baroness is kidnapped by the yakuza, and Destro teams with G.I. Joe to rescue her. (Flint has also gone missing.) In the fight, Alex proves his newfound loyalty to his father and follows orders exactly. The Commander is captured by Serpentor, now in charge of the Coil. When he and a group of Joes affect an escape, he contacts Destro, stating "assist me, and all debts are clear". Rallying all of Cobra with him, Destro assaults Cobra Island and helps defeat the Coil. After the battle, the Commander has disappeared, and Destro is left, perhaps reluctantly, in charge of Cobra. When the Commander finally surfaces with Storm Shadow in tow, Destro takes the opportunity to leave Cobra. In a shocking twist, however, the Baroness does not join him.

Heading up his own operations in an attempt to revitalize M.A.R.S., Destro strikes a deal with Guillermo Gomes in Sierra Muerto to double cross Sierra Gordo's president. Destro sends in Iron Grenadiers disguised as Sierra Muerto mercenaries. He then approaches President Delacruz for permission to build weapons factories in Sierra Gordo in exchange for routing the invaders. Intending for the president to be assassinated and for Gomes to take control of both countries, Destro expects to become the region's biggest gun runner. This elaborate scheme is derailed by Duke, who had helped foster peace between the warring countries before Destro began his machinations, and he arrests Destro.

Put on trial by the United Nations, Destro betrays his allies, offering not only full disclosure of a number of dirty dealings concerning key UN countries, but also the guaranteed capture of Cobra Commander to assure his release. Taking his offer, the Joes are charged with transporting Destro by train to lure Cobra into a trap. Both Cobra Commander and Baroness arrive to free Destro, and the Commander and Hawk battle. Cobra Commander shoots Hawk in the back but is then shot himself by the Baroness.

The ruse is successful. Cobra Commander is in US custody, leaving Destro and a pregnant Baroness in control of Cobra. During this shift in power, Alex and Lilian are charged with recruiting Charles Halifax, also known as Wraith, to free Major Bludd and Scrap-Iron from Blackwater Prison. Cobra begins to solidify under Destro's leadership, as the search for a mysterious Tempest device drives their new campaign. Yet Destro's dedicated attempt to control Cobra is short-lived when it is revealed that Zartan, not the Commander, was captured by G.I. Joe. Freeing Zartan, the Commander emerges from hiding and overthrows Destro. During the coup, the Baroness and Wraith (charged with her personal safety) are seemingly killed when the Commander detonates the Night Raven they are aboard. As happened many years before when the Baroness' HISS tank exploded, Destro is incapacitated by his grief. He sits in a Cobra prison as the Commander takes over a much more efficient Cobra.

=== America's Elite ===
Escaping from Cobra when the Red Shadows attempted a worldwide take-over, Destro resurfaces (literally) a year later a much different man. Now operating from a submarine, Destro has become embittered and distant from both his son Alex, and Wraith, who somehow avoided boarding the Night Raven before its explosion. He aids Vance Wingfield in attacking the United States with shielded satellites as he brokers a deal with China. When Scarlett is overtaken by BATs while attempting to contact former Cobra agent Cesspool, Destro is revealed to be pulling the strings. Torturing Scarlett for information, Destro is undermined by Alex, who attempts to rid them of the dangerous G.I. Joe prisoner. When the Joes eventually catch up to him, Destro sets the sub to self-destruct, and escapes with Alex. Snake Eyes is trapped in a flooded corridor, though he is later revived with "ninja magic".

After his rehabilitation, Destro gives Alexander a new mask, formally naming him heir to the Destro legacy. However, when the Baroness escapes from G.I. Joe custody, Destro is lured into a trap by the Cobra Commander. In exchange for his infant son, Eugen, Destro not only turns over the M.A.R.S. Empire, but Alexander as well, to Cobra Commander. Destro's actions give Cobra Commander the power to incite World War III, using Alexander to lay siege to London with cloaking technology that M.A.R.S. developed from Wraith's Armor. To combat M.A.R.S. technology, Storm Shadow is sent by the G.I. Joe team to find Destro and the Baroness. Storm Shadow strikes a deal with Destro to aid the Joes, with the proviso that when Cobra is defeated Destro will turn himself over to the authorities. Destro and Sparks succeed in disarming the Cobra-controlled satellites. Destro then flies to Europe with the Baroness to stop Alexander and his Iron Grenadier, supported by the Baroness' secret army: Athena. Upon recognizing Destro, the Iron Grenadier cease combat. Destro manifests his disapproval to Alexander who takes off the family mask and walks away from his raging father. Armada fatally shoots Alexander, thinking that's what Destro wanted. Destro walks away carrying his deceased son, while the Baroness shoots and kills Armada. It is later revealed that Destro was true to his word and turned himself in to the authorities, while Baroness has evaded capture. In one of the series' final scenes, Baroness is seen watching his trial on TV with their child Eugen.

=== Action Force continuities ===
==== IPC ====
In the mid-1980s, IPC's Battle Action Force weekly comic (in conjunction with Palitoy) began to conform their storylines to more closely resemble the Hasbro toyline. Destro was introduced as the second incarnation of the Red Shadows character, Red Jackal, driver of the Hyena tracked vehicle.

After the Red Shadows were betrayed by Baron Ironblood, Red Jackal sought revenge against his former leader, who had become the Cobra Commander. The Commander sprayed acid into Jackal's face, but chose to spare his life and renamed him Destro. (Note: For more details, see Red Jackal's transition to Destro.))

As in other continuities, the loyalties of this version of Destro were suspect. In School for Snakes, he confronted his former colleague the Black Major, who had also survived Ironblood's treachery and sworn revenge. They conspired to kill Cobra Commander, after which Destro would take over the organization, supplying the Major with the means to disappear into obscurity. But when a group of Cobra loyalists led by the Baroness fought back, Destro decided that he could not risk being exposed, turning against and seemingly killing the Black Major—who survived.

==== Marvel UK ====
After IPC turned the Action Force license over to Marvel UK, Destro's character falls in line with the U.S. depiction. Destro features heavily in the magazine's original content, as the most prolific of Cobra's members and personal antagonist to Flint and Lady Jaye. Because of Marvel UK's serial nature, Destro is not as complex as his American counterpart, being portrayed as an actual villain, willingly fighting Action Force and arming Cobra. He is highly manipulative, not just using Action Force in his schemes but also trying to manipulate Cobra Commander; he believes Cobra can win in the long term, but that the Commander is too excessive and, if not subtly controlled, will go too far and cause the Great Powers of the world to wipe Cobra out.

=== Alternate continuities ===
==== G.I. Joe vs. Transformers (Devil's Due) ====
Destro features prominently in this series of four crossover miniseries which pose the question: What if Cobra discovered the Ark, and rebuilt the Autobots and Decepticons as weapons of war? Destro helped provide Cobra with the technology to rebuild and control the Cybertronians, and even pilots Soundwave on a mission.

==== Transformers vs. G.I. Joe (Dreamwave) ====
Set during World War II, Destro is part of a Nazi-esque Cobra who have subjugated the Decepticons and taken over Europe.

==== Reloaded ====
A modern revamp of the "Real American Hero" franchise, Destro is recruited by Cobra Commander in the initial book Cobra Reborn. He was later part of the Cobra plot to steal the Constitution where he fights the G.I. Joe agent Roadblock.

==== Sigma 6 ====
Devil's Due created a mini-series based on Sigma 6. It follows the style and the content of the animated series, spotlighting a different member of Sigma 6 and Cobra in each issue. Destro appears in the first issue, battling Duke in Guam.

== Animation ==
=== Sunbow ===
In G.I. Joe: A Real American Hero (the animated series that began in 1985), Destro was voiced by Arthur Burghardt. In the Sunbow produced series, Destro is portrayed much differently, as he and Cobra Commander have a more contemptuous relationship. Destro is not afraid to express his opinions even when contrary to the Commanders, and he even physically assaults him on occasion. Cobra Commander usually tolerates the behavior, as only Destro knows how to operate his doomsday devices. Destro is the creator of such technological super weapons as the Weather Dominator. He has also created some organic implements of destruction such as the Creeper Vine, as seen in The Revenge of Cobra miniseries. Furthermore, while Cobra Commander was generally portrayed as a bungler, Destro was both a more serious and more competent villain.

The origin of Destro's mask is given in the first-season episode "Skeletons in the Closet" which reveals that an ancestor of Destro was convicted of witchcraft and forced to wear a hideous metal mask that marked the nature of his crime. As a mark of defiance, all of this man's descendants chose to wear masks, Destro included. They meet at a family manor in Scotland every winter solstice to honor their ancestors and confirm their vow to wear the mask until all the world's governments have been dissolved and world anarchy will come in posthumous revenge for laws which repressed people such as their ancestor. This episode also reveals that the ancestor is shared with G.I. Joe member Lady Jaye. She stumbles upon the meeting, which results in a battle between G.I. Joe and Cobra that destroys Destro's ancestral home. This was orchestrated by the Baroness as vengeance for Destro's earlier infidelity.

In season two, having grown tired of Cobra Commander's failures, Destro joins Doctor Mindbender and Tomax and Xamot in an attempt to create a new leader. They eventually succeed when they create Serpentor. It appears as though Destro realizes Serpentor is growing too powerful and that under Cobra Commander's leadership, Destro had more power within Cobra, so in the second season's final episode, he helps Cobra Commander and the Coil, an organization built by the Commander to eliminate Serpentor, Doctor Mindbender and G.I. Joe.

==== G.I. Joe: The Movie ====
Destro has a supporting role in G.I. Joe: The Movie, offering his loyalty to Serpentor, Golobulus and Cobra-La, quickly turning against Cobra Commander once again. In the final battle between the Joes and Cobra-La, Destro is seen fighting, but it is not revealed how he escaped from the explosion that destroyed the rest of Cobra-La.

=== DiC ===
In the miniseries "Operation: Dragonfire" of the DiC G.I. Joe, Destro (voiced by Maurice LaMarche) has survived the events of the movie and is now Serpentor's second. He now sports a gold mask and Iron Grenadier uniform with cape. Apparently having tired of the Baroness, Destro is now in a relationship with Zarana. Humiliated by Destro's rejection, the Baroness uses Dragonfire energy to return Cobra Commander to semi-human form. Once he has returned, Cobra Commander contacts Destro, who informs the Commander he will join him again if he is able to overthrow Serpentor. He is also forced to "dump" Zarana by the Baroness, which he does, literally, through a trap door. With Serpentor defeated, Destro renews his alliance with Cobra Commander and repairs his relationship with the Baroness.

Throughout the series, Destro does not show as much disrespect for the Commander as he did in the Sunbow series, appearing more loyal than before. He does maintain his role as the more levelheaded and intelligent of the Cobra leaders, and often has to talk some sense into Cobra Commander and stop his hysterical rants. He still shows his disdain for the Commander, but mainly keeps his remarks to himself. In the second season of this series, Destro regains his silver mask and dons a variation of his classic outfit.

=== Spy Troops and Valor vs. Venom ===
Destro appears in the direct-to-video CGI animated movies G.I. Joe: Spy Troops and G.I. Joe: Valor vs. Venom, voiced by Scott McNeil. In the first film, he funds the construction of the Battle Android Troopers and serves as one of their controllers (along with Storm Shadow) to fight G.I. Joe when they invade the base. The B.A.T.s prove ineffective due to the need to split his focus, leaving them vulnerable. By the second film, Destro is helping the Venomization project created by Dr. Mindbender, but he cannot provide a payload delivery system for three years. Therefore Cobra takes a G.I. Joe base designed to launch rain creating payloads. The new Venom troopers are more effective as they are brainwashed mutants, but the Joes create an antidote.

=== Sigma 6 ===
In G.I. Joe: Sigma 6, he is loyal to Cobra Commander and still serves as Cobra's weapons designer. Destro is placed in custody at the series end. This version of Destro may be a cyborg or at least possess some bionic enhancements, having stated he possesses "circuits in his body". Marc Thompson provides the voice for Destro.

=== Resolute ===
In the miniseries G.I. Joe: Resolute, Destro and the Baroness are in a subplot in which they have taken a team of scientists hostage. Roadblock, Beach Head, Gung-Ho and Stalker have to rescue them before Destro starts killing them. Unlike other animated versions of Destro, this one has a noticeable Scottish accent. He was voiced by Eric Bauza.

=== Renegades ===
Destro appears in G.I. Joe: Renegades voiced by Clancy Brown with an amalgamated Scottish/Irish accent. Known as James McCullen XXIV, he was the CEO of the legitimate M.A.R.S. Industries until it became allied to Cobra Industries. He is shown to be on friendly terms with the Baroness, though the extent of their relationship remains unclear. In the episode "Rage", McCullen was in collaboration with Scrap-Iron in capturing war veterans from the street in order to find the right brainwaves that would help in the mass-production of some exo-armors for Cobra Industries. Tunnel Rat ended up being one of the victims. Later, Roadblock is a victim and McCullen found a match in his brainwaves. When G.I. Joe arrived and disabled the controls on the exo-armor, Roadblock lunged towards McCullen and Scrap-Iron as they get into their helicopter. McCullen declares the test complete now that they have the data and fires a missile at G.I. Joe. Though Roadblock managed to deflect the missile back at the helicopter injuring part of Scrap-Iron's head. McCullen tells Scrap-Iron that his injuries will be avenged as he sets the exo-suit to self-destruct. The G.I. Joes managed to get away before it explodes while McCullen and Scrap-Iron escape.

In the episode "The Enemy of My Enemy", Cobra Commander (in his Adam DeCobray alias) has McCullen collaborate with Doctor Mindbender in order to have the Bio-Viper combine with the Exo-Armor. McCullen wasn't pleased with working with Doctor Mindbender and even disguised himself in order to leak info of this to G.I. Joe. McCullen even shows Adam DeCobray and Baroness the Achilles heel of the Bio-Vipers when he unleashes the Iron Grenadier exo-armors. When McCullen mentions about the exo-armors stating that he will give them 10,000 exo-armors as a pre-order, he states that he will require payment for them. However, Mindbender reveals McCullen's leaking info to the Joes while revealing his own Mecha-Vipers. Following that, Cobra Commander reveals himself while setting Serpentor on McCullen. Following that, having M.A.R.S. Industries absorbed into Cobra Industries, Cobra Commander places a mask on McCullen to force him to serve him while christening him Destro (which is his family's name for those who embarrass or shame the family). Here his mask is unlike previous version, more robotic as opposed to the appearance of a bald man with metal skin shown in other incarnations.

In "Castle Destro", the Joes end up in Destro's castle where the Bio-Dag weapon is developed by Destro and Doctor Mindbender. Destro requests to Cobra Commander that Baroness arrives in Scotland to oversee the project. Destro also tells Baroness that the Joes ended up in his castle. When Baroness arrived, Destro has a royal repast with Baroness before they see the Bio-Dag. Destro then shows Baroness footage of the Joes in his castle. Destro then speaks over the speakers as he activates the Battle Android Troopers and proposes a partnership to Baroness. When the Joes get too close to the Bio-Dag, Destro unleashes the Iron Grenadier armors and more B.A.T.s on them. As Duke ends up hijacking Baroness' chopper, Destro has his troops fire on Baroness' chopper while telling her that he will buy her a new chopper. Destro then has his troops hold their fire and have the other Joes imprisoned in the dungeon. Cobra Commander then contacts them and states that the Bio-Dag should be launched into a mining town in Greenland to take care of Cobra Industries' competition. Destro and Baroness interrogate the Joes and Scarlett tells him that the Techno-Viper was heading to Scotland. Destro suspects that Doctor Mindbender probably programmed the Techno-Viper to dispose of Destro as both of them leave to watch the Bio-Dag's launch. The Joes end up attacking the launch site causing a malfunction that would cause the Bio-Dag to fill the castle with fire. Duke then attacks Destro as he succeeds in freeing the Bio-Dag. Duke manages to destroy the Bio-Dag. Destro manages to carrying a weakened Baroness away as the castle ends up exploding. Destro tells Baroness that he will take full responsibility on what the Joes did to the Bio-Dag.

In "Cutting Edge", Destro secretly hires a high-tech Jinx in order to take out Cobra Commander as part of his revenge. Cobra Commander orders Destro to send every B.A.T. to Cobra Towers to take out Jinx. In "Revelations" Pt. 2, Destro attacks the Joes in a prototype H.I.S.S. Tank when they infiltrate Cobra Commander's stronghold. The Joes managed to defeat him and the H.I.S.S. Tank by throwing missiles on it causing it to crash. It is unknown if Destro survived or not.

== Live-action films ==
Destro
- G.I. Joe character
- Christopher Eccleston as James McCullen/Destro in the film G.I. Joe: The Rise of Cobra.
- First appearance: 2009
- Portrayed by: Christopher Eccleston
- Voiced by: Robin Atkin Downes (video game)

In-universe information
- Affiliation: Cobra
- Specialty: Weapons designer
- File name: James McCullen
- SN: Classified
- Rank: Classified
- Series: G.I. Joe: The Rise of Cobra

=== G.I. Joe: The Rise of Cobra ===
Destro appears as the main antagonist of the live action film G.I. Joe: The Rise of Cobra, portrayed by Christopher Eccleston. In the movie, James McCullen's family background is retconned as his ancestor James McCullen IX was only punished by the French monarchy in the 17th century after being caught selling weapons to both them and England, condemned to have a red-hot iron mask welded onto his face and serve as an example to others who attempted to overthrow the crown. He also reveals that James McCullen I was also called Destro, explaining it to be short for the "Destroyer of Nations" which his family has been known for because of their shady arms-dealing.

Destro after acquiring his signature mask.

Supplying the world's governments through M.A.R.S. (here known as Military Armaments Research Syndicate), James McCullen is secretly a terrorist mastermind, using NATO's funding for his research on nanomites before arranging for it to be stolen by M.A.R.S. agents, using one of the warheads to attack Paris as retribution for his ancestor's punishment. McCullen is also planned on ruling the world. He is the primary antagonist for most of the movie. Near its conclusion, McCullen is severely burned as Rex Lewis takes control of the organization, with the familiar Cobra logo on the side of his personal submarine. Rex, now "Cobra Commander", uses more of the stolen nanomites to reconstruct McCullen's face, transforming his skin into living metal. Suffering the same fate as his ancestor and subject to the nanomites' mind-controlling properties to be obedient to Cobra Commander, McCullen is dubbed "Destro" before being arrested and placed in a high security prison.

=== G.I. Joe: Retaliation ===
Destro appears in the sequel film, G.I. Joe: Retaliation, having been transferred with Cobra Commander from the USS Flagg to a high-security German prison and placed in stasis. When Storm Shadow and Firefly break Cobra Commander out of prison, Cobra Commander decides to leave Destro imprisoned, joking "you're out of the band". His fate is left unknown.

== Video games ==
Destro is one of the featured villains in the 1985 G.I. Joe: A Real American Hero computer game. Destro appears as a boss in two games for the Nintendo Entertainment System: G.I. Joe (1991) and G.I. Joe: The Atlantis Factor (1992). In the first NES game, he wears his Iron Grenadier uniform and pilots The Despoiler air vehicle. He is also the second-to-last boss in Konami's G.I. Joe arcade game. In the video game G.I. Joe: The Rise of Cobra, he is the third boss, who is fought towards the end of the "Jungle Fuel" act.
