= Cobra (G.I. Joe) =

Fictional terrorist organization in the G.I. Joe franchise

- Logo of Cobra

Publication information
- Publisher: Marvel Comics; Devil's Due Publishing; IDW Publishing
- First appearance: G.I. Joe: A Real American Hero
- Created by: Larry Hama

In-story information
- Type of organization: Terrorist military group
- Base(s): See Bases
- Leader(s): Commander: Cobra Commander; Emperor: Serpentor
- Agent(s): Weapons supplier: Destro; Director of intelligence: Baroness; Chief of science: Doctor Mindbender; Crimson Guard co-leaders: Tomax and Xamot; Ninja bodyguard: Storm Shadow; Primary field commander: Major Bludd; Anti-armor specialist: Scrap-Iron; Dreadnoks leader: Zartan

Roster

Cobra (sometimes referred to as Cobra Command) is a fictional terrorist organization and the nemesis of the G.I. Joe Team in the Hasbro action figure toyline G.I. Joe: A Real American Hero and G.I. Joe: Sigma 6, as well as in related media.

Cobra was first introduced during the launch of the G.I. Joe: A Real American Hero toyline in mid-1982. The toyline was accompanied by a Marvel Comics series, written by Larry Hama, and an animated television series by Sunbow and Marvel Productions. However, the origin and portrayal of Cobra has differed in each of them.

Marvel Comics invented the Cobra concept, with the name having been proposed by Archie Goodwin. When Marvel first proposed the concept, Hasbro was reluctant to make toys of the villains for fear that they would not sell. According to Jim Shooter, "later ... villains became 40% of their volume." Cobra's iconic logo was later created by Hasbro designer Ron Rudat.

== Organization ==
=== High command ===
All members of the Cobra organization are portrayed as fighting against G.I. Joe, however, there are several internal power struggles within the group.

- Cobra Commander – The leader and founder of the Cobra organization. His face is mostly hidden, either with a hood, with only his eyes visible, or with a featureless high-tech battle helmet. In the Sunbow animated series, this concealment was said to be used in order to hide his inhuman disfigurement, but it was discovered later that it was actually done to maintain the secret of his civilian identity – he was revealed to be an agent from a race of reptilian serpent people known as "Cobra-La" where a spore accident gave him extra eyes. In the comic, he is regarded as the most dangerous man on Earth because of the extent of his ability to attract followers. Only the Baroness and Destro have seen his face.
- Serpentor – The Cobra Emperor, created through cloning research done by Doctor Mindbender. The process used DNA extracted from the remains of ruthless military leaders, including Julius Caesar, Napoleon Bonaparte, Attila the Hun, Vlad Tepes (animated series only), Alexander the Great, Hannibal, and Genghis Khan. In the Sunbow TV series, G.I. Joe member Sgt. Slaughter's DNA was used as a live source. In the comics, Storm Shadow is the tenth and only live source of DNA instead of Sgt. Slaughter. In addition to his genetic disposition, an early experiment also gave him access to the brain patterns of G.I. Joe HALO jumper Ripcord, allowing him to use G.I. Joe's strategies against them. In the comics, Serpentor was killed by Zartan, only to be revived by a Cobra splinter group known as the Coil, and then killed again by Cobra Commander. In the Sunbow series, Serpentor was created to supplant Cobra Commander as the supreme leader of Cobra, using Cobra Commander as his willing scapegoat for his failed attempts to rule the world. It was later revealed that Serpentor was created at the behest of Cobra-La.
- Destro (James McCullen Destro XXIV) – A Scotsman who is depicted as wearing a metal mask, which was enabled by a form of nano-tech or liquid metal. Destro is an arms dealer who often attempts to usurp leadership of Cobra. He is the hereditary multi-billionaire industrialist and founder/CEO of M.A.R.S. (Military Armaments Research Syndicate) who uses his personal army called the Iron Grenadiers to start conflicts in order to sell weapons to both sides. Destro has a warped sense of honor and a grudging respect for G.I. Joe.
- Baroness (Baroness Anastasia Cisarovna) – The Baroness is a daughter of European aristocrats who became terrorists after their son (the Baroness' brother) was murdered. Her brother had been in a political hot spot aiding refugees when he was taken hostage alongside the group of relief workers he had volunteered for. US Army Rangers had attempted to free the hostages, but the mission was botched and resulted in the brother's death. In the original Marvel comics, she blamed Snake Eyes for his death. The Baroness serves as Cobra's director of intelligence, and is romantically involved with Destro.
- Doctor Mindbender – A mad scientist and former dentist, he created several mind-control devices and was also an expert on genetic manipulation like creating Serpentor, his clones, the Bio-Vipers, and the Monstro-Vipers. He is responsible for the creation of the B.A.T.s, as well as perfecting the Brainwave Scanner. Though usually depicted as being quite muscular, Mindbender is portrayed as being cowardly and preferring to avoid physical confrontations.
- Tomax and Xamot – Twin brothers who lead the Crimson Guard and are the respectable corporate face of Cobra. When not engaged in field missions, Tomax and Xamot are found wearing suits and ties, managing Cobra's business affairs. The brothers share an empathic connection. While this is often useful as it allows them to communicate wordlessly and finish each other's sentences, it is also a liability as they feel each other's pain during fights. Tomax and Xamot are mirror images of each other, except for Xamot having a scar on the right side of his face, portrayed on the left side in the 1985 action figure. The twins run a multinational conglomerate named Extensive Enterprises as the co-CEOs and are known more for their skills in the boardroom rather than on the battlefield.
- Storm Shadow (Thomas "Tommy" Arashikage) – A ninja trained in martial arts who serves as both an assassin and bodyguard for Cobra. His origin varies depending on the source – in various animated series, he is a cold-blooded villain and unrepentant killer. In Marvel Comics (which reveals that he served in the US military in Vietnam with Snake Eyes and Stalker), he joined Cobra in order to gather evidence and clear his name after having been framed for the murder of the Hard Master by Cobra operative Zartan. Storm Shadow eventually leaves Cobra and becomes a member of G.I. Joe, though captured and brainwashed by Cobra Commander to once again serve Cobra. He then breaks free and rejoins G.I. Joe. In the Sunbow/Marvel series, Storm Shadow was depicted as a rival to Spirit and later Quick Kick instead of Snake Eyes. In the DIC animated series, Storm Shadow only joined Cobra to find out who dishonored his clan before defecting to G.I. Joe.
- Zartan – The leader of the Dreadnoks, a master spy, and an assassin. He is a master of disguise, often literally morphing into the exact physical form of the person he seeks to impersonate (an ability attributed to genetic experimentation). In most storylines, Zartan is also capable of changing his skin color to blend in with his background. His special ability is disrupted by sunlight.

=== Minor command ===
- Major Bludd – Major Sebastian Bludd is an Australian mercenary with extensive combat experience, who sometimes works for Cobra. He is a master tactician and is an expert in all known weapons. Usually portrayed as Cobra's infantry commander, Major Bludd is best known for the assassination of General Flagg, the original leader of the G.I. Joe team, as well as for the running gag that Bludd wrote very bad poetry.
- Firefly – The world's greatest saboteur, Firefly's background is a mystery. A mercenary and assassin, Firefly offers no guarantees or refunds. He is portrayed as an expert in all types of explosive ordnance and demolition materials. He is also the faceless master of the Koga ninja clan.
- Doctor Venom – A Cobra scientist who played an important role in the first two years of the comic book story and was the creator of the Brainwave Scanner. He was then portrayed as having been killed in action, eventually to be replaced by Doctor Mindbender.
- Scrap-Iron – The anti-armor specialist of Cobra. Along with Dr. Mindbender, he also invented the B.A.T.s.
- Kwinn – An Inuk mercenary, only appearing in the first two years of the comic book series. A mercenary with a strong code of honor, he was described as having previously worked for the CIA, Mossad, MI6 and the KGB, leading to him working with Cobra in Sierra Gordo. He later renounced his life as a mercenary, but was betrayed and killed by Doctor Venom in the series.
- Fred VII – A soldier in the Crimson Guard, having temporarily impersonated Cobra Commander after believing that he had fatally shot him. He died after the real Cobra Commander made his return in the series.
- Black Out – Sniper Thomas Stall, who was rejected by G.I. Joe for failing his psychological exam, and was suspected of being involved with the disappearance of his sister. After being imprisoned, Thomas broke out of the brig at Fort Huachuca during an attack by Cobra, whom he surrendered to and subsequently joined.

=== Factions ===
There are different factions of Cobra:

==== Black Dragon ====
The Black Dragon is an organization that works for Cobra. While the original group was wiped out during the Cold War by the original G.I. Joe team, there was a survivor that formed the next incarnation of the group who allied with Cobra. The Black Dragon Leader has the Black Dragon organization consisting of Black Dragon Troopers and Black Dragon Ninjas.

==== Cobra-La ====
Cobra-La is an ancient civilization led by Golobulus that Cobra was said to have connections with in different adaptions. Golobulus is served by Pythona, Nemesis Enforcer, and his Royal Guards.

==== Coil ====
The Coil is a religious wing of Cobra and a highly influential cult that is known to the public as a self-help group.

In the Devil's Due Publishing comics continuity, Serpentor is the leader of the Coil following his revival. Its known members include Doctor Mindbender, Firefly, Hannibal (a clone of Serpentor), Overkill, Overlord, and Zandar. In addition, there are also children clones of Serpentor named after Serpentor's DNA sources and consisting of Alexander, Attila, Genghis, Julius, Napoleon, Phillip, Thomas, and Vlad.

In the IDW Publishing comics, the Coil is dedicated to knowledge and self-improvement. Serpentor denies that it is a cult. In addition, the IDW variant of Venomous Maximus is a member of the Coil who is loyal to Serpentor. It was also mentioned by Venomous Maximus that the Coil was responsible for bringing Croc Master and other individuals into Cobra.

==== Dreadnoks ====
Led by Zartan and his siblings Zandar and Zarana, the Dreadnoks are a militarized biker gang who work for Cobra when brute force is needed. Zartan used them for backup and brought them with him when he joined Cobra with Zarana in particular becoming a top ranking agent of Cobra under Fred VII. Members include Burn Out, Buzzer, Crusher, Demolisher, the Dreadheads, Gnawgahyde, Monkeywrench, Ripper, Road Pig, Storm Rider, Thrasher, Torch, Zartan's daughter Zanya, and Zanzibar.

==== Iron Grenadiers ====
The Iron Grenadiers are a private army owned and maintained by Destro. Its known members are Darklon, General Mayhem, Metal-Head, Roddy Piper, Sergeant Major Duncan, and Voltar.

==== Lunartix Empire ====
The Lunartix Empire is a kingdom of aliens who are allied with Cobra. Its known members are Predacon, Carcass, Lobotomaxx, and the Manimals Iguanus, Slythor, and Warwolf.

==== Python Patrol ====
Although their origin differs in the animated and comic series, the Python Patrol is an elite unit of Cobra, hand-selected by Cobra Commander (in the comic, they were hand-selected by his impostor). What makes this group stand out is their use of stealth coating technology, masking their vehicles and uniforms from most forms of electronic detection. Known members of this group include Copperhead, Major Bludd, Croc Master, Lightning, and Trigger.

==== Red Ninjas ====
The Red Ninjas were a group of exiled Arashikage ninjas. They were originally led by Baron Ironblood until he mysteriously disappeared. Afterwards, the Red Ninjas led by the Red Ninja Leader allied with Cobra and would do mercenary work to the highest bidder should one come into view.

==== V.E.N.O.M. ====
V.E.N.O.M. (short for Vicious Evil Network Of Mayhem) originated in the M.A.S.K. franchise. Specialist Trakker's action figure for the G.I. Joe toyline states that V.E.N.O.M. is a technology and weapons research branch and mercenary army for Cobra.

=== Rank and file ===
The vast majority of Cobra is made up of legions of uniformed soldiers. Nearly all of them appear masked in order to be anonymous and widely diversified according to specialties and functions. Some of the more prominent include:

- Cobra Troopers – These are the basic infantry soldiers introduced in 1982, equipped with normal military gear (as opposed to the more hi-tech gear of the Vipers), with Cobra Officers as the field leaders. They are featured on both the animated and comic series.
- Crimson Guard – Led by Tomax and Xamot, these elite soldiers were first introduced to the series in 1985. It is said that in addition to intense military training, they are required to have a degree in either accounting or law, and are often used in deep cover operations, posing as civilians or politicians. Later toys expanded on the Crimson Guard concept with the release of figures such as the Crimson Guard Immortals and Commanders, as well as group-specific vehicles. As another part of their deep cover operations, many Crimson Guardsmen undergo plastic surgery in order to adopt identical features in case one Seigie (the phonetic pronunciation of "C.G") is required to replace another in a public cover. The Crimson Guard also maintain Cobra's legal business fronts.
- Cobra Vipers – Introduced in 1986 as a replacement for the Cobra Troopers, these infantry soldiers complement the Cobra Troopers in both the animated and comic series. The concept, originally introduced in 1985 with the introduction of Tele-Vipers (communication experts) quickly evolved into a suffix for all future Cobra troops (such as Air-Viper, Ice-Vipers, Motor-Vipers, Techno-Vipers, etc.). With regards to the original adjective-less Vipers, Hasbro has often alternated between establishing the Vipers as the entry-level position into Cobra, or for them being the elite of Cobra's ground troops as far as them being equal to or above the regular blue shirt troops.
- B.A.T.s – The Battle Android Troopers were introduced in 1986 and are used extensively in the animated series to present an army that the heroes could gun down without killing living beings. Intended as an alternative to living soldiers, the androids are hazardous to both friend and foe because of poor eye sensors.
- Night Creepers – A syndicate of hi-tech ninjas and mercenaries hired by Cobra as spies or assassins. They made an appearance in both the animated and the comic series, where they become a recurring enemy of the Ninja Force.

=== Bases ===
Cobra maintains a number of bases around the world. In several media incarnations, Cobra's primary base is Cobra Island. In the Marvel Comics series, Cobra has bases, underground cells, and even whole communities scattered across the globe. The following are several specific locations with names:

- Broca Beach – After the destruction of Springfield, Cobra created another town as their secret base of operations in America. This one was transformed from an abandoned seaside town. Former residents of the destroyed Springfield town were relocated here.
- Castle Destro – Destro's fortress in Scotland. Training ground for the Iron Grenadiers. Though destroyed by Cobra Commander, a new castle was presumably reconstructed some years later.
- Cobra Citadel, also known as the Silent Castle – Cobra's base of operations in Eastern Europe, located in Trans-Carpathia. Owned primarily by Destro, he incorporated many secret passageways and features into the castle's design including the ability to shift its configuration (through a complex series of levels, pulleys, and gears) into a near-exact likeness of Castle Destro – both internally and externally. Although he initially gave up the rights to the castle to Destro, Cobra Commander later decided he wanted it back as it was rather close to his operations in Darklonia. Its design was first featured in "The MASS Device" TV miniseries.
- Cobra Consulate – A high-rise in New York City used by Cobra as an embassy and base of operations after Cobra Island was declared a sovereign nation. Its upper levels were destroyed in a battle with G.I. Joe, and the building was abandoned by Cobra for some time (save for a few late-night top-secret meetings). In the Devil's Due comics it was rebuilt and used once again.
- Cobra Island – The primary base of Cobra operations. It was created after a massive man-made earthquake. Cobra lawyers, well-prepared, moved in and had it declared a sovereign nation. It was the battlefield for the Cobra civil war and the battle against The Coil. After Cobra disappeared for several years, the island was seized by the U.N. It then came under the control of The Coil, then Cobra, and was finally destroyed by a nuclear warhead, which also killed every member of the Coil.
- Helicarrier, also known as the Cobra Air Ship – A flying aircraft carrier from the Sunbow animated series. It served as a mobile base for Cobra until it was lost in a battle over a matter-antimatter device, when it rammed G.I. Joe's conventional aircraft carrier. Both carriers sank to the bottom of the sea. Another helicarrier was commissioned, but was also destroyed over the skies of Liberty Island in New York City.
- Millville – A steel town that fell into economic ruin after the closing of the local plant. When Cobra descends en masse on it one day, the residents are swayed by Cobra Commander's promise of quick wealth and prosperity for those who submit to his rule. However, Cobra immediately subjugates the town via a brainwashing device, leading to the formation of a local resistance. Combat with numerous Autobots and Decepticons result in Cobra ultimately abandoning the town and its citizens.
- Monolith Base – A massive mountain complex located in Badhikistan. It served as Cobra's main base but was taken over in an all-out assault from G.I. Joe.
- Redwood Base – A covert base located inside a redwood tree trunk, possibly utilized through Cobra's shrinkray technology
- Springfield – A small rather anonymous town in the U.S. which Cobra secretly operated as a base. The town was poor and desperate when the man who would become Cobra Commander arrived. He became the town's savior and it was there that he started Cobra. Many covert operations were held there, including the creation of Serpentor, which in turn led directly to the town's population being evacuated to Cobra Island when the Joes confronted Cobra. In the two-part Sunbow-produced episode There's No Place Like Springfield, the town existed on an island and was known as Temple Alpha. Springfield was actually a facade for an underground Cobra training facility. However, unlike the comics, the town above ground was populated primarily by synthoids.
- Extensive Enterprises – A global conglomerate based out of the twin Enterprise Towers in Enterprise City. Tomax and Xamot serve as its owners and co-CEOs.
- M.A.R.S. – Military Armaments Research Systems/Syndicate – a legitimate weapons manufacturing firm headquartered in Callander, Scotland. Destro is the current owner and CEO.
- Terror Drome – In the comic series from Marvel Comics, the Terror Drome is a small pre-fab fortress, sold by Cobra to third world countries and developing nations for defense. Cobra personnel are required to run the Terror Dromes, providing ways for Cobra to infiltrate the country. The playset of the base was first released in 1986, and came with three vehicle bays, munitions depot, a prison cell, tower-mounted cannons, a launch silo for a mini-jet, and an action figure.

To hide certain aspects of its operation, Cobra maintains a number of legitimate business fronts (in addition to the town of Springfield itself and its encompassing businesses) nearly all of which appear to be anagrams of the word "Cobra".

== Comic series ==
=== Marvel Comics ===
Cobra had its beginnings when the financially ruined man who would become Cobra Commander settled in an American town called Springfield. Blaming the federal government and big business for his misfortunes, he conceived a plan to form a secret organization to acquire wealth and power and thereby take his revenge on the world. Springfield was a perfect place to start the organization, as the town itself had fallen on hard times and the population was disillusioned. Soon, the organization was growing with the entry of like-minded individuals from all over the country. Much of Cobra's early funding came from pyramid schemes and other semi-legitimate business plans, and that financial success allowed a gradual and intense takeover.

In a very short time, Cobra evolved from a business into a paramilitary movement. Motivated by greed and power, the group soon expanded all over the country, operating in secret, engaging in terrorism to achieve their objectives. By the time the U.S. government recognized Cobra as a threat, the organization had already gained footholds as a powerful private army and terrorist organization around the world.

Many of its members (especially those in the Crimson Guard units) lead normal lives while supporting Cobra covertly. Cobra attracted members with the promise of financial rewards and power for those willing to act ruthlessly. It also promoted a society based on order and strength, with its "model community" of Springfield serving as an example of Cobra's objectives.

Cobra would eventually achieve a temporary legitimacy by the artificial creation of Cobra Island, which was recognized as an independent nation by the international community. This allowed Cobra to have diplomatic facilities in the United States via a Cobra Consulate building acquired in New York City.

During Serpentor's tenure, Cobra's primary source of income came from arms sales to Third World nations. This led to a clash with Destro's M.A.R.S. Organization, which provided Cobra with much of its arms.

For a comic series predominantly aimed at children, Cobra was a relatively mature depiction of a highly successful terrorist organization. With its strong symbolic imagery, charismatic and ruthless leader and fanatical hierarchy, the fictional group is similar to other fictional terrorist and totalitarian organizations such as SPECTRE of James Bond fame and the similar Marvel Universe organization HYDRA.

Larry Hama depicted Cobra troops as being motivated by money, power and a sense of brotherhood. However, they are not fanatical to the point where they would fight to the last man and to the last breath. If all is lost, they would willingly surrender or run away had they the chance, something their leaders rarely let them do. The brutal training depicted in the file cards of the troopers are very much characteristic of ritual hazing.

The only instance that has shown Cobra as a suicidal fanatical organization was in issue #8 where the troopers willingly let themselves blow up on a boat after their loss.

=== Action Force ===
In the United Kingdom, G.I. Joe was marketed under the name Action Force. The original antagonists in the Action Force series were the Red Shadows. The Red Shadows were a terrorist organization led by Baron Ironblood and his lieutenant the Black Major. Prominent members included artillery expert Red Laser and tank commander Red Jackal.

The Action Force series was eventually written to more closely match the American G.I. Joe franchise. The "World Enemy No. 1" storyline in the Battle Action Force comic had Ironblood betraying the Red Shadows, abandoning them to die pointlessly, and going into hiding. When he reemerged, he had organized a new group called Cobra and renamed himself as Cobra Commander. The Red Jackal tracked down Cobra Commander with the intention of killing him to avenge the treachery he had performed. On the brink of throttling the Commander, Jackal succumbed to stun gas and passed out, not quite completing his sentence declaring his intention to destroy the former Baron Ironblood. Admiring his tenacity and resourcefulness, Cobra Commander elected not to kill the man, instead allowing him to continue to serve. To remind Jackal that, in the end, he failed to eliminate Cobra Commander, the leader renamed him 'Destro' — the last word he spoke as his former self.

=== IDW ===
In the IDW universe, Cobra is a shadowy, rumored organization, led by a man known only as "the Commander"; however, there have been other Commanders in the past, elected into 'office' by the faceless body known as the Cobra Council. The Baroness refers to it as "an old organization ... ensconced in its own traditions" that has existed for centuries. The Council members' identities are unknown.

Other high ranking agents include Xamot and Tomax (corporate leaders, coerced by Cobra to merge their Extensive Enterprises organization with them), Crystal Ball (psychological tactics master and internal affairs), Major Bludd, Captain Vicuna (submarine commander), and the chief scientists Dr. Mindbender and Copperback.

Cobra's standard method is to destabilize an already unstable nation, using both terrorism and shell companies to hit the economy. They then openly hire out their Crimson Guard soldiers to that country and slowly make the population trust them more than their government. One operation involved manipulating a small war in Africa, forcing the attacked nation to sell off its national assets.

It has its own secret communications network, the Cobranet, unconnected to the regular Internet. Terrorist groups across the planet are somewhat aware of Cobra and scared of it. An international aid company serves as a Cobra front, and they use a psychological test to identify potential, loyal recruits. It is later revealed that a large cult, The Coil (led by Serpentor), is also part of Cobra's organization. They have a prison called Section Ten and Selene Base, located on the Moon.

Mainframe first stumbles across the global Cobra conspiracy by accident, and was believed by General Hawk to be crazy. Determined to reveal the organization, he went AWOL. Later, Snake Eyes also goes AWOL looking for Cobra. The Joes later hear the word "Cobra" mentioned after busting one of Destro's arm shipments, but are unaware of what it truly is. Duke believes the organization is just a myth and Hawk now believes it is the codename for an operation, but by this point Scarlett believes Cobra is a real, large-scale threat. As a result, she kept unauthorized contact with Snake Eyes about it. At about this time, Chuckles is sent to infiltrate a secret organization which, it is soon discovered, is in fact Cobra.

Thanks to Mainframe and Snake Eyes, Cobra is revealed to the Joes. At the same time, Xamot and Tomax reveal they have used Chuckles (whom they knew all along was a spy) to feed selective information to the Joes in order to intimidate them. Chuckles goes rogue in order to bring the organization down, and succeeds in assassinating the Commander and causing the nuclear obliteration of a Cobra island base.

After a series of catastrophic losses to the Joe team (including the destruction of Section Ten, the loss of the M.A.S.S. Device and the subsequent abandonment of the lunar Selene Base), the Cobra Council responds by creating a contest to determine who would be the next Commander: whoever murders the most Joes takes on the role of Commander. A ruthless agent named Krake wins the competition, largely by revealing that he had killed and replaced one of his rivals with Zartan, doubling his kill score and showing the initiative to break the rules to win.

The new Commander orders the open invasion of the Southeast Asian nation of Nanzhao and successfully convinces the world at large that Nanzhao was a brutal regime that profited off the international drug trade; in reality, the invasion is a front for acquiring the country's massive gold reserves and driving up the price of heroin, a drug that Cobra itself deals. The Commander then slaughters the Cobra Council and assumes full control of Cobra.

== Animated series ==
=== Sunbow ===
The Sunbow animated series did not explore how Cobra began. It was only in G.I. Joe: The Movie that it is revealed that the organization was a front runner for a 40,000-year-old underground civilization called Cobra-La, whose snake-like inhabitants were driven underground by the advent of humankind. Cobra Commander was, in actuality, a member of this underground race. He was tasked with creating an organization that would overrun the world at large. It is also revealed that the creation of Serpentor was an initiative by Cobra-La: through the use of a biological mind controlling device, they implanted the idea into Dr. Mindbender's mind.

The creation of Cobra-La was an unintentional side effect of Hasbro's demand that the heretofore unintroduced Cobra Emperor Serpentor be inserted into the series, despite the fact that Cobra Commander had long been established as the one-and-only head of Cobra. Series story editor and writer Buzz Dixon offered two possible storylines to make it work: one had the senior Cobra leadership, fed up with Cobra Commander's constant failures, deciding to literally build a better leader. The other presented Cobra as being a front for a vast, secretive and far more sinister organization whose leadership finds Cobra Commander lacking and sends Serpentor as a replacement. Hasbro, liking both ideas, had the series writers combine both concepts.

The writers despised the name Cobra-La and had only originally intended to use it as a working name to be replaced by a "real" name in the finished product; they were overruled by Hasbro. Buzz Dixon had a much different idea originally for the origin of Cobra. In a story entitled "The Most Dangerous Man in the World", it was to be revealed that Cobra was originally organized around the political theories of a Karl Marx/Friedrich Nietzsche-type figure, whom Cobra Commander locked away when the Commander began corrupting the Cobra philosophies from their original principles. A first-season two-part episode, "Worlds Without End", portrays an alternate reality in which Cobra has established control over the United States (and apparently all of the world). Although Cobra's reign is totalitarian, it does not use its power to promote any ideology beyond glorifying its leadership, and there is no sign of Cobra-La or other inhuman backing.

None of the senior Cobra leaders, except Destro and the Baroness, likes the others. During the encounter with the Gamesmaster, Zartan accuses Destro of kidnapping Cobra Commander; Destro refuses to bargain for Zartan's release from G. I. Joe, and regards Cobra Commander with contempt; the Baroness disbelieves Cobra Commander's promise that he will send help after escaping via helicopter, and prefers G.I. Joe member Lady Jaye to use the vehicle; and Cobra Commander only trusts himself. Even after Cobra's complete victory in "Worlds Without End", distrustful rivalry between Cobra Commander and Destro persists, bringing the regime to the brink of civil war.

According to the recruitment brochures for Cobra's troops, they provide excellent dental.

=== DiC ===
In the DIC Entertainment sequel series, Cobra Commander regained his true form following the events of the movie and reclaimed Cobra from Serpentor with help from his Python Patrol.

=== Sgt. Savage and the Screaming Eagles ===
In the pilot episode of Sgt. Savage and his Screaming Eagles, General Blitz states that he helped create Cobra, during a teleconference between Blitz and Cobra Commander.

=== G.I. Joe: Sigma 6 ===
Several of the organization's prominent members such as Cobra Commander, Destro, the Baroness and Zartan are featured prominently in the G.I. Joe: Sigma 6 television series. Many of these members are given some form of cybernetic enhancements. The Sigma 6 version of Cobra maintains B.A.Ts as the primary bulk of their army with human personnel acting mostly as technicians.

=== G.I. Joe: Renegades ===
In the G.I. Joe: Renegades television series, Cobra is presented as Cobra Industries, a multinational megacorporation involved in communications, pharmaceuticals and military technologies. The US government has long suspected them of criminal activity, but had no evidence. The Joes, here framed as criminals for a crime they did not commit during their attempt to discover the truth, attempt to find evidence of Cobra's plans of world domination. Cobra Commander, Baroness, Destro, and Doctor Mindbender are seen as the most prominent members of Cobra, but Major Bludd, Storm Shadow, Zartan, Firefly, and Doctor Venom also work for Cobra. Tomax and Xamot are unaffiliated with Cobra in the series and instead portrayed as cult leaders who swindle money from people and target both the Joes and Cobra.

== Live-action film ==
=== G.I. Joe: The Rise of Cobra ===
Despite its title in the live-action film G.I. Joe: The Rise of Cobra, Cobra as an organization does not appear as such. Instead, M.A.R.S. Industries, owned by James McCullen, are presented as the main antagonists along with Baroness, Storm Shadow, Zartan and the Doctor. While McCullen builds up his company and convinces NATO to fund his research and development projects to build more advanced weapons, he also conceives an elaborate plan to take over the world by creating an enemy that would inspire fear on a global scale and make everyone turn to the most powerful individual on Earth: the President of the United States. To this end, McCullen turns M.A.R.S.'s unlimited resources towards espionage and terrorism.

While not present, there are several hints throughout the film of what will become Cobra, such as the presence of M.A.R.S. Industries elite warriors, called Neo-Vipers, and the Doctor taking the alias of "the Commander", stating that "the time has come for the cobra to rise up and reveal himself" while escaping in a submarine branded with Cobra's logo. At the end of the film, the Commander and McCullen, now known as Destro, are imprisoned on the USS Flagg while Zartan appears at the end impersonating the U.S. president.

=== G.I. Joe: Retaliation ===
While the Commander and Destro are still imprisoned, Cobra reappears in the sequel film G.I. Joe: Retaliation, under the leadership of the U.S. president who is secretly Zartan in disguise. Zartan recruits ex-Joe Firefly and Storm Shadow to free the Commander, but leaves Destro in prison. Storm Shadow would later betray Cobra and joins the Joes on stopping Cobra and killing Zartan.

=== Snake Eyes ===
Cobra played a big part in Snake Eyes with Baroness as a figurehead and yakuza head Kenta Takamura as members. Storm Shadow joined Cobra in the end after being cast out of Clan Arashikage, after the betrayal and death of Kenta.

== In other media ==
=== Invincible ===
In Image Comics' Invincible and its television adaptation, Cobra is parodied as the Lizard League (alongside Hydra and the Serpent Society), whose members include Queen Lizard (voiced by Tatiana Maslany), King Lizard (voiced by Scoot McNairy as an adult, Jacob Tremblay as a child), Salamander (voiced by Phil LaMarr), Supreme Lizard (voiced by Fred Tatasciore), Iguana, and Komodo Dragon.

=== Community ===
Cobra is featured as the main antagonists of the Community episode "G.I. Jeff", written by Dino Stamatopoulos and directed by Rob Schrab. It is set within the coma dream of Jeff Winger (Joel McHale) as he finds himself as "Wingman" taking on Cobra after accidentally killing Destro and introducing death to the world of the G.I. Joe animated series. In addition, this episode has exclusive Cobra members like Craig Pelton (Jim Rash) as Vice Cobra Assistant Commander, Ben Chang (Ken Jeong) as karate fighter Overkill, Ian Duncan (John Oliver) as psychological warfare specialist Xim Xam where he has the same Tomax and Xamot link with his civilian twin brother Mix Max (also John Oliver), and Buzz Hickey (Jonathan Banks) as Major Dick.
