= Scrap-Iron =

- G.I. Joe character
- First appearance: 1984
- Voiced by: Michael Bell (Sunbow/Marvel); Phil LaMarr (Renegades)

In-universe information
- Affiliation: Cobra
- Specialty: Anti-Armor Specialist
- File name: CLASSIFIED
- Birth place: CLASSIFIED
- Primary MOS: Tank Destroyer

Scrap-Iron is a fictional character from the G.I. Joe: A Real American Hero toyline, comic books and animated series. He is Cobra's anti-armor specialist and debuted in 1984.

== Profile ==
Scrap-Iron is methodical as well as precise, as he finds any form of imperfection repellent. His primary military specialty is tank destroyer. Scrap-Iron was apparently a product designer working for the armaments company that Destro owns, performing field testing on any newly designed armor-piercing munitions as well as sub-munitions. He specializes in remotely-launched piezo-electric fused anti-tank weaponry that are laser-guided and rocket-propelled.

=== Phoenix Guard ===
The members of the Phoenix Guard were Cobra agents in disguise, but for Cobra Commander's elaborate ruse to succeed, each member of the team needed doctored military records and manufactured personal histories. Scrap-Iron's fabricated identity was Mech, real name Timothy P. Janes, born in Minneapolis, Minnesota. Mech's specialties were explosive ordnance, demolitions, information technology and engineering. He received basic training at Fort Benning, and Explosive Ordnance Disposal (EOD) training at Redstone Arsenal and Eglin Air Force Base. He also completed Airborne School at Fort Benning, and Air Assault School at Fort Campbell. He was the team's explosives ordnance and demolitions expert.

== Toys ==
Scrap-Iron was first released as an action figure in 1984. An updated version in a comic book two-pack with Wild Bill gave him a head with deep scarring and a "dead", milky-white right eye.

== Comics ==
=== Marvel Comics ===
In the Marvel Comics G.I. Joe series, he first appeared in G.I. Joe: A Real American Hero #43 (January 1986). In that issue, he is working with Firefly as a security team for the Cobra-controlled town of Springfield. They meet up with the fugitive Buzzer and end up pursuing the older ninja, Soft Master. By chance, the trio meet up with Candy Appel, the daughter of a prominent Crimson Guardsman. With her is a drunken driver and Billy, the son of Cobra Commander. Scrap-Iron fires upon all of them, and only Billy survives, albeit with the loss of an eye and leg.

Scrap-Iron and Firefly again work as a team to track down an unauthorized call from the Springfield 'Tiki Bar'. It is being made by Rip Cord, who flees in a car. Scrap-Iron takes aim but it is stopped by a Cobra operative, whose young daughter is in the vehicle. The girl captures Ripcord.

Scrap-Iron fights in the first Cobra Civil War, which takes place on Cobra Island. Around this time, he fights G.I. Joe space forces as the two sides battle over weaponized satellites.

Scrap-Iron works as an operative in a false hostage situation for Nexus-Tech, a company with ties to Cobra.

=== Devil's Due comics ===
Scrap-Iron's influence carries over to the Devil's Due series of G.I. Joe comics. After a long battle on Cobra Island, Scrap-Iron and Major Bludd become prisoners of G.I. Joe. Scrap-Iron is broken out of prison by the mercenary named Wraith.

Cobra Commander, disguised as the White House Chief of Staff, manages to use his operatives to create the Phoenix Guard, a new "alternative" to the G.I. Joe Team led by an unsuspecting General Rey. Scrap-Iron joins this team under the name of "Mech". The Phoenix Guard demolishes "The Rock", the Joes' current headquarters, injuring many Joes and killing thirty seven members of the support personnel. Once the deception is revealed, Scrap-Iron ends up arrested, and imprisoned in "The Coffin" prison facility in Greenland.

While investigating the past of General Rey, Duke discovers that he had a long ago confrontation with Scrap-Iron in the fictional country of Borovia. Scrap-Iron is eventually freed alongside several others, during an assault on The Coffin led by Tomax.

== Animated series ==
=== Sunbow ===
He first appeared in the Sunbow G.I. Joe cartoon in the "Revenge of Cobra" mini-series voiced by Michael Bell. He is also featured in the mini-series "Arise, Serpentor, Arise", in which he and Doctor Mindbender are the inventors of the B.A.T (short for Battle Android Trooper). He sides with Cobra Commander when Doctor Mindbender meets with Destro and Tomax and Xamot on creating the Cobra Emperor. When Cobra Commander sabotages the first attempt with a mutated virus, Scrap-Iron betrays him and informs Mindbender in exchange for a million gold serpentines. In the second attempt, Scrap-Iron stops Cobra Commander from sabotaging it, enabling Serpentor to be born. While Serpentor is battling Sgt. Slaughter, Scrap-Iron is paid by Cobra Commander to not thwart his plan to attack Serpentor with reprogrammed B.A.T.s. Scrap-Iron takes part in Serpentor's invasion of Washington, DC, where he attacks the White House only to learn that the President and the Vice-President are out of town. Scrap-Iron reports this to Destro and the Baroness.

=== G.I. Joe: Renegades ===
Scrap-Iron first appears in G.I. Joe: Renegades episode "Rage." Scrap-Iron is a scientist at M.A.R.S. Industries who captured war veterans from the streets in order to brainwash them and test their new exo-armors and power their rage. He did this on behalf of Destro while posing as a preacher offering war veterans coffee. Tunnel Rat became one of the victims. Soon, Roadblock ended up captured when he found Scrap-Iron and was subjected to the same experiment that Tunnel Rat and other people befell. When G.I. Joe arrived and disabled the controls on the exo-armor, Roadblock lunged towards Destro and Scrap-Iron as they get into their helicopter. Roadblock managed to deflect the missile back at the helicopter injuring the right side of Scrap-Iron's head. Destro told Scrap-Iron that his injuries will be avenged. In the episode "Castle Destro," Scrap-Iron's right head still has some burns as he and Destro work on the Bio-Dag rocket. After Duke destroy the Bio-Dag, Scrap-Iron gets away with Destro and the Baroness.

== Video games ==
Scrap-Iron is one of the featured villains in the 1985 G.I. Joe: A Real American Hero computer game.
