= Serpentor =

Character from the G.I. Joe franchise

- G.I. Joe character
- Serpentor the Cobra Emperor (From G.I. Joe: A Real American Hero #23 by Image Comics and Devil's Due)
- First appearance: G.I. Joe: A Real American Hero #49 (July 1986)
- Voiced by: Dick Gautier (Sunbow/Marvel cartoon); Maurice LaMarche (DiC cartoon)

In-universe information
- Affiliation: Cobra
- Specialty: Cobra Emperor
- File name: N/A
- Birth place: Springfield, US
- Subgroups: Coil

Serpentor is a fictional character and a recurring antagonist from the G.I. Joe: A Real American Hero toyline, comic books, and animated series. Introduced in 1986, the character rules as Emperor over Cobra. Most versions of the character are depicted as a composite clone of history's greatest leaders. Serpentor serves as the primary antagonist of the second season of the original animated series.

== Fictional character biography ==
Serpentor was designed to be the ultimate Cobra leader. Doctor Mindbender and Destro combed the tombs of the greatest leaders in history to find cells with DNA traces. These genetic sequences from long-deceased individuals were combined to produce a composite clone incorporating the combined intellectual abilities of Napoleon, the ruthlessness of Julius Caesar, the daring of Hannibal, and the shrewdness of Attila the Hun. Serpentor is a brilliant tactician and a master of political intrigue, and was eventually capable of wresting control over Cobra from Cobra Commander.

== Toys ==
Serpentor was first released as an action figure in 1986, packaged with the Air Chariot. The Air Chariot is like a flying throne, with two 7.62mm attack guns, reinforced battle shield, and hover engine. He was released in 2002 as a re-issue two-pack that was exclusive to online retailers. A new mold of Serpentor was released in 2005, as part of a comic three-pack, which included a reprint of issue #49 of the Marvel Comics series. Serpentor was released again in 2007 as a single carded figure as part of the 25th anniversary series. This figure was also packaged with a re-release of the Air Chariot in a vehicle 2 pack, and with a DVD set that included the DVD of "Arise, Serpentor, Arise!".

== Comics ==
=== Marvel Comics ===
In the Marvel Comics series, Serpentor initially appeared in G.I. Joe: A Real American Hero #49 (April 1986). The character in the comics was created by Doctor Mindbender and Destro as a "super soldier", intended to lead and inspire the troops while Cobra Commander remained in power while also making use of Doctor Venom's equipment including the Brainwave Scanner. His creation involved Cobra collecting genetic material from various historical figures: Julius Caesar, Napoleon Bonaparte, Attila the Hun, Philip II of Macedon and his son Alexander the Great, Vlad the Impaler, Hannibal, Genghis Khan, Grigori Rasputin, Montezuma, and Geronimo. However, the comic diverges from the version in the animated series in that the DNA sample from Storm Shadow (who had defected from Cobra and was in a vegetative state at the time) was also used in the creation of Serpentor. Serpentor was first used to fight the Joes in Springfield as Destro and Baroness advise all Cobra operatives and their families to destroy any Cobra-related evidence, kill all non-essential pets, and head to Springfield High School for their branches to be evacuated. Serpentor was later evacuated as Cobra Commander learned how Serpentor was created.

Serpentor was also portrayed as having something akin to multiple personalities as a result of being created from the DNA of multiple tyrants. In another incident, he was able to access memories of one of his genetic forebearers. Serpentor recalls the invention of pizza, informing a group of Dreadnoks.

While his relationship in the comics was meant to be more of a figurehead, Serpentor is ambitious, leading to power struggles between him and other members of Cobra. Serpentor contends with Cobra Commander impostor Fred VII, and the two are often at odds. Their rivalry eventually escalates into the Cobra Civil War, in which G.I. Joe is ordered to side with Serpentor to defeat the forces of Fred VII and the Baroness. During the conflict, Zartan kills Serpentor with an arrow to the eye.

=== Other versions ===
==== Devil's Due Publishing ====
Devil's Due continued the storyline of the Marvel series, and years after the events that led to Serpentor's death, his body was found and reanimated by renegade scientists. Soon a secretive faction called the Coil formed. Serpentor targeted G.I. Joe and Cobra forces alike.

==== G.I. Joe vs. the Transformers: The Art of War (Vol 3) ====
Serpentor in the G.I. Joe vs. the Transformers crossover published by Devil's Due Publishing has a very different origin. In the third G.I. Joe vs. the Transformers miniseries, the US government builds an android called "Serpent OR", using processors taken from Megatron and programmed with information on Earth and Cybertron's greatest war-leaders. Serpent OR, seeing himself as Megatron's son and heir, sets out on a quest to gain the Matrix for himself, believing it will grant him the power he needed to rule. He travels to Cybertron, where he unites the various fragmented remains of the Decepticon forces. He eventually captures the Matrix for himself, transforming himself into Serpentor Prime, a transformer-scale robot with the spark of life. This results in rethinking his strategy to conquer, but Cobra Commander takes over Serpentor Prime's body with a remote control device that was planted back on Earth. His rampage did not last long, as Hawk was able to open the Matrix, transforming Hawk into a mighty leader and rendering the Commander comatose. Serpent OR's exact fate beyond this is unknown.

==== Transformers: Timelines ====
The Official Transformer Fan Collectors Club's third Figure Subscription set included a human-made Transformer created by a former Cobra agent who sought to upload the data from the Serpentor project into the body of a deceased Sweep. However, as a result of an attack by the Earth Defense Command on this operation, the personality of Clayton "Hawk" Abernathy is added to Serpent O.R.'s programming, creating a Transformer known as Serpent O.R. with feelings of loyalty to Cobra, the Decepticons, and the Earth Defense Command.

=== IDW Publishing ===
In the IDW continuity, Serpentor's real name is Stephen Minasian and he is the leader of the Coil, the religious wing of Cobra and a highly influential cult that is known to the public as a self-help group. The Coil worship a god named Golobulus (also called Gola-Bulas), who created a paradise called Cobra-La before human ignorance destroyed it. Serpentor claims to be the Final Disciple of Golobulus, a reincarnation of the best qualities of the god's previous champions such as Napoleon and Alexander the Great.

Serpentor is a member of the Cobra Council, the ruling body that elects the Cobra Commander (who outranks Serpentor). In the case of a new Commander needing to be elected, Serpentor's view "carries a ton of weight. If he is backing someone, then their stock will clearly go up in the eyes of the Cobra Court". Serpentor isn't interested in becoming the new Commander. During the contest to decide the new leader, Serpentor starts assisting the Baroness, Major Bludd and Tomax in getting the role - that way, the eventual leader will "need me".

== Animated series ==
=== Sunbow ===
Serpentor appears as the main antagonist in the second season of the original 1980s G.I. Joe: A Real American Hero animated series. Serpentor first appeared in the five-part second-season premiere "Arise, Serpentor, Arise!", voiced by Dick Gautier. The animated version of Serpentor was designed to be a new, superior leader of Cobra created by Doctor Mindbender through a breakthrough in cloning research. He was conceived as the perfect warrior, extracted from the unearthed remains of some of the greatest generals and conquerors of all time as well as other notable historic figures – Julius Caesar, Napoleon Bonaparte, Attila the Hun, Philip II of Macedon and his son Alexander the Great, Ivan the Terrible, Vlad the Impaler, Hannibal, Genghis Khan, Grigori Rasputin, Montezuma, Geronimo, Eric the Red and fictional Egyptian general Xanuth Amon-Toth. In the animated continuity, Sun Tzu's DNA was also intended to be part of Serpentor's creation, but the attempt to obtain his DNA was thwarted by Sgt. Slaughter whose DNA was then intended for use as a substitute. With the DNA collected, Doctor Mindbender plans to have the samples placed in the inert protoplasm and converted by a containment shroud. The first attempt to create Serpentor was sabotaged by Cobra Commander who secretly dumped a mutant virus into the Sgt. Slaughter DNA chamber causing a monster that rampaged throughout Cobra Island until it dissolved. During Doctor Mindbender's second attempt, Cobra Commander is betrayed by Scrap-Iron (who told Doctor Mindbender what had happened). Upon the recapture of Sgt. Slaughter, the creation is a success and Serpentor is born. As a result of Sun Tzu's DNA being missing, Serpentor is very intolerant and overbearing. He issues most of his orders with the phrase "This I command!" He also shows some of Slaughter's willingness to lead from the front lines, in contrast to Cobra Commander. Mere moments after his creation and being given his distinctive costume, Cobra Commander even talked with Serpentor about being the figurehead for Cobra only for Serpentor to knock him to the ground and stating that he is not symbolic. He then accepts a challenge from Slaughter, and the two battle throughout the Terror Drome where Serpentor shows off the strength he inherited from Slaughter's DNA during the fight. Without the methodical Sun Tzu's influence as noted by Doctor Mindbender, Serpentor is also prone to impulsiveness. The Tele-Vipers and Crimson Guard are introduced to Serpentor by Doctor Mindbender during his fight with Sgt. Slaughter. The G.I. Joe team sent to evacuate Sgt. Slaughter were able to get Sgt. Slaughter out while Serpentor was attacked by the B.A.T.s. Serpentor's first major act—leading Cobra in an attack upon Washington, D.C. He succeeded in capturing the city and demanded the surrender of the President (who was out of town with the Vice-President at the time), Congress and G.I. Joe. G.I. Joe manages a counterattack on Cobra, turning the operation into a complete fiasco, but just as the Joes are about to capture Serpentor, a sudden burst of fire drives them back. It comes from Cobra Commander, who convinced Mindbender to free him, because he knew how to use a weapon. With the last fully-fueled Nightraven prepared to take everyone back to the Terror Drom, Cobra Commander begs for Serpentor to let him be his scapegoat; playing on his delusion of appearing perfect. Serpentor relents as they get away.

In "Million Dollar Medic", Serpentor sends Baroness, Tomax, and Xamot to claim Owen Van Mark's company through whatever way possible. After every attempt failed, Serpentor contacts Baroness where he will deal with her later.

In "The Rotten Egg", Serpentor forms an alliance with Buck McCann to take over Leatherneck's old Marines academy and have its cadets fight for Cobra.

In "My Brother's Keeper", Serpentor hears of Doctor Mindbender's plans to create a Voltronic Glaxitor as he plans to have a scientist named Jeremy Penser obtained to help fix it.

The episode "My Favorite Things" reveals that Serpentor can assume the facial features of those whose DNA are included in his genetic composition. In addition, a few more donors to Serpentor's creation are revealed: a Viking warrior known as "Ulrik the Batterer", and the reptilian king "Takshaka" from Indian mythology. Coincidentally with the latter, Serpentor's Takshaka side can only drink a liquid that is proven acidic to everything else.

In "Ninja Holiday", Cobra Commander holds a secret contest where the winner will be the one to take out Serpentor.

In "Joe's Night Out", Serpentor disguises a rocket as a nightclub as part of a plot to ransom everyone inside.

Throughout season 2, Cobra Commander attempts several times to kill Serpentor through different plots. Doctor Mindbender and the other members of Cobra's inner circle began to resent Serpentor's leadership style, with hints that the show might follow the Marvel Comics concept of a Cobra Civil War, pitting Serpentor and those loyal to him against those who would have sided with Cobra Commander, who still sought to regain control of Cobra. This storyline was never resolved, and the events of G.I. Joe: The Movie and the succeeding series by DIC make no mention of it whatsoever.

==== G.I. Joe: The Movie ====
In G.I. Joe: The Movie, Serpentor yells at all the members of Cobra for their incompetence. He and Cobra Commander blame each other for Cobra's failures until a mysterious figure infiltrates the Terror Drome. The intruder reveals herself as Pythona, an emissary of the ancient culture "Cobra-La", and informs Serpentor of the need to steal the Broadcast Energy Transmitter (B.E.T.). During the attack to obtain the B.E.T., Serpentor is injured and left to be captured by G.I. Joe. Aided by Cobra-La, Cobra forces are later dispatched to rescue Serpentor and bring him to the hidden kingdom of Cobra-La. After Serpentor's arrival at the ancient kingdom, Cobra-La's supreme ruler Golobulus informs the Cobra leadership present that it was he who implanted the idea of creating Serpentor in Doctor Mindbender's brain with a biological organism called a "psychic motivator". Along with the other Cobra hierarchy, Serpentor accepts Golobulus's authority and vows to fulfill his goal of destroying human civilization. During an attack to acquire the B.E.T. from G.I. Joe headquarters, Serpentor hurls a spear to kill Lt. Falcon, but Duke takes it and slips into a coma. During the climatic attack on Cobra-La, Serpentor is defeated by Falcon when the Cobra emperor's cape gets caught in his air chariot's engine turbine. Serpentor is last seen flying out of control on his air chariot, struggling to get himself free of his cape.

=== DiC ===
Serpentor appeared in the DiC-produced G.I. Joe miniseries G.I. Joe: Operation Dragonfire, voiced by Maurice LaMarche. He reorganizes Cobra with Destro, Baroness, Scoop (revealed to be a secret G.I. Joe spy), Zarana, Gnawgahyde, and Copperhead returning to the team. In the series, Serpentor attempted to harness the mythical power known as Dragonfire, but was unaware of Cobra Commander's return thanks to Baroness, Gnawgahyde, and Copperhead. In the ensuing civil war, Serpentor was captured by Cobra Commander and his Python Patrol. Cobra Commander then used his Pythonizing Ray made from a part of the Dragonfire he obtained to combine Serpentor with Gnawgahyde's pet iguana. Cobra Commander stated that the effects will be temporary and that by the time he changes back, he'll have a taste for flies. He was last seen running off into the jungle in his iguana form with Gnawgahyde chasing after him as he threatened to barbecue Serpentor. Serpentor is not seen again in the DiC series, leaving it unclear if Serpentor's iguana form successfully escaped or not.

=== G.I. Joe: Renegades ===
In G.I. Joe: Renegades, Serpentor is the name of a giant cobra who belongs to Cobra Commander. Created by Doctor Mindbender as a gift to Cobra Commander, the Serpentor cobra possesses enough intelligence to follow basic commands and even swallow any human that angers Cobra Commander as well as spit them back out on cue if Cobra Commander decides to let that person live.
