= List of G.I. Joe series =

The following is a list of all of the Hasbro G.I. Joe series released as of 2024.

- G.I. Joe: America's movable fighting man (1964–1969)
- G.I. Joe Adventure Team (1970–1977)
- G.I. Joe Defenders (1976)
- G.I. Joe: Super Joe Adventure Team (1977)
- G.I. Joe: A Real American Hero (1982–1994)
- G.I. Joe: Hall of Fame (1991–1994)
- G.I. Joe: Street Fighter II (1993)
- G.I. Joe: 30th Anniversary (1994)
- Sgt. Savage and his Screaming Eagles (1994)
- G.I. Joe: Limited Exclusives (1995–1997)
- G.I. Joe: Classic Collection (1995–2004)
- G.I. Joe: Masterpiece Edition (1996–1997)
- G.I. Joe Extreme (1996–1997)
- G.I. Joe: Stars & Stripes Forever Collection (1997–1998)
- G.I. Joe: Timeless Collection (1998–2003)
- The Adventures of G.I. Joe 2010 (1999)
- G.I. Joe: The Real American Hero Collection (2000–2002)
- G.I. Joe: Double Duty (2001)
- G.I. Joe vs. Cobra (2002)
- G.I. Joe: Spy Troops (2003)
- G.I. Joe: 40th Anniversary Reproductions (2003–2005)
- G.I. Joe: Valor vs. Venom (2004–2005)
- G.I. Joe: Sigma 6 (2005–2007)
- G.I. Joe: Direct To Consumer (2006)
- G.I. Joe: A Real American Hero 25th Anniversary (2007–2009)
- G.I. Joe Adventure Team (2007)
- G.I. Joe 8-inch Commando Figures (2007)
- G.I. Joe Combat Squad (2007)
- G.I. Joe: The Rise of Cobra (2009)
- G.I. Joe: Renegades (2010)
- G.I. Joe: The Pursuit of Cobra (2010–2011)
- G.I. Joe: A Real American Hero 30th Anniversary (2011–2012)
- G.I. Joe: Retaliation (2012–2013)
- G.I. Joe: 50th Anniversary (2014–2016)
- G.I. Joe Classified Series (2020-present)
