= G.I. Joe vs. Cobra =

Toy line by Hasbro

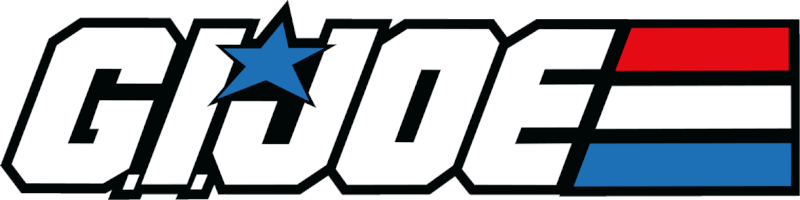
- Type: Action Figures
- Invented by: Hasbro
- Company: Hasbro
- Country: United States
- Availability: 2002–05
- Features: G.I. Joe

G.I. Joe vs. Cobra is the G.I. Joe toy line series that ran from 2002 to 2005. The toy line was produced by Hasbro.

== Overview ==
The series represented the first major relaunch of the G.I. Joe franchise since 1996's G.I. Joe Extreme. Story and theme-wise, it was a continuation of the G.I. Joe: A Real American Hero series. G.I. Joe vs. Cobra was preceded by a limited run Toys R Us exclusive line that made use of previous molds for production of G.I. Joe action figures in 1997 and 1998, as well as the 2000-2001 "Real American Hero Collection" 2-packs, which were available at mass retail.

Despite having no major G.I. Joe toy releases, Devil's Due Publishing managed to acquire the license to produce new G.I. Joe comic books. The new comics' success and the media attention it spawned fueled renewed interest in G.I. Joe, and led to the production of a new line of toys featuring both old and new characters. New sculptures and body architecture were utilized for the line.

The G.I. Joe vs. Cobra line ran for three years, before being phased out and replaced with the successor line G.I. Joe: Sigma 6. In that time, it was supported by the new comic series and two direct-to-video animated movies. It was also supplemented by several Toys R Us and convention exclusives. Each year of the line’s release centered on a different theme on the G.I. Joe/Cobra conflict. During the new sculpt era, Hasbro launched G.I. Joe. com that has G. I vs. Cobra games.

=== G.I. Joe vs. Cobra ===
Released in 2002, G.I. Joe vs. Cobra was borne out of the success of Devil's Due's G.I. Joe comics. The series brought back classic characters, as well as introduced new ones. For the first time, there was a theme to the toy line, this one focusing on the rivalries between members of the G.I. Joe Team and Cobra. The action figures were sold in two-packs carrying a G.I. Joe and a Cobra character. The file cards that came with them explained how their rivalry with each other began. The first wave of figures utilize T-crotch tooling similar to Hasbro's own Star Wars toyline, but the next wave brought back the classic O-ring to new molds, with some of the Wave 1 figures being retooled to accommodate the O-ring.

The switch from T-crotch to O-ring resulted in a slight delay in the release of Wave 2. To compensate for this, Hasbro issued a Wave 1.5 consisting of repainted figure molds from the original A Real American Hero line that included characters such as General Tomahawk (a renamed Hawk due to trademark lost) and the Headman (who was rewritten as a Cobra agent).

Figures released from Wave 2 and onward all included "Sound Attack" accessories, which contained sound chips that could be plugged-in into certain vehicles (such as the Night Attack Chopper) and play sound effects based on the weapon. The Sound Attack gimmick was abandoned during the final wave of the Spy Troops sub-line released the following year.

A series of animated commercials produced by Reel FX Creative Studios aired in 2002 to promote the new line of figures. The first commercial featured narration by Don LaFontaine.

=== Spy Troops ===
The toyline was re-titled as G.I. Joe vs. Cobra: Spy Troops for the second year. The G.I. Joe logo that has been used on the packaging for the A Real American Hero line since 1982 was replaced with the logo from the original 12-inch figure series, which depicted the face of the original Action Soldier figure above the "J". Most of the G.I. Joe vehicles released during the Spy Troops sub-line used this logo.

The plot involved G.I. Joe and Cobra in espionage against each other via various disguises. Each two-pack featured either Joe with a Cobra disguise or a Cobra with a Joe disguise, or one figure with a camouflage coat to blend into the background. On the back of the box was the mission relating to the two characters.

There was a direct-to-video animated movie, G.I. Joe: Spy Troops released towards the end of the line. The line began to incorporate some of the characters from the comics, such as Kamakura and Crosshair.

=== Valor vs. Venom ===
G.I. Joe: Valor vs. Venom was the third and final series in the G.I. Joe vs. Cobra line. The "vs. Cobra" part of the title was dropped and the G.I. Joe logo was reverted to the A Real American Hero version. The central plot involved Cobra creating animal/human hybrid soldiers dubbed Venom Troopers (or V-Troops) via a mutagenic chemical known as Venom. G.I. Joe counters with advanced technology.

Again, like Spy Troops, it was supported by a direct-to-video film, G.I. Joe: Valor vs. Venom. Some figures from this series were also available in single packs. The line was geared more towards children, by featuring the return of "Action Attack".

== Sub-lines ==
=== 1:6 scale figures ===
In addition to the standard 1:18 scale, G.I. Joe vs. Cobra characters were also released in a 1:6 scale similar to the Hall of Fame sub-line that was sold during the later years of the original A Real American Hero line between 1991 and 1995. Some of the 12-inch figures released in 2002 (namely Heavy Duty, Grunt, Dusty and Firefly) were actually holdovers from the short-lived Double Duty line sold in late 2001, which featured reversible clothing and transformable accessories.

=== Built to Rule ===
Built to Rule was a building blocks toyline from Hasbro that was marketed as "Action Building Sets". These sets were released from 2003 to 2005. All sets came with one set of building blocks which could be built into a full sized vehicle, and one specially designed 3 3/4 G.I. Joe figure. The forearms and the calves of the figures sport places where blocks could be attached. The 2003 Built To Rule followed the G.I. Joe: Spy Troops story line.

=== Direct To Consumer/Toys "R" Us Exclusive line ===
With the cancellation of the Valor vs Venom series Hasbro released a new series simply titled "G.I. JOE: A Real American Hero". Unlike most of the previous G.I. JOE vs Cobra/Valor vs Venom series, these figures were released alone on a single card. Each wave of figures had three Joe agents, one named Cobra agent and two Cobra troops.

Figures from this series were initially only available from Hasbro.Com or other online toy shops. Because of this and to differentiate this series from the original Real American Hero line from the 80s and 90s fans dubbed it "Direct To Consumer" or "DTC". Later this series was also made available as a Toys "R" Us exclusive. The figures in this series were made from the same construction as the previous G.I. JOE vs Cobra/Valor vs Venom series and as such are seen as the most recent G.I. Joe vs. Cobra Line and a continuation of the G.I. JOE vs Cobra line, as fans expecting a new G.I. Joe vs. Cobra Line of Figures with a sequel to Valor vs Venom. The line incorporated molds from the unreleased "G.I. JOE Robot Rebellion" Line that was set to be launched during 2005, however it was put on hiatus and replaced by Sigma 6. DTC Wave 4 was cancelled and later released as G.I. Joe Club Exclusive. In 2011 the G.I. Joe Club released a 25th Anniversary style DTC Barrel Roll.

== Comics ==
The G.I. Joe vs. Cobra did not have a comic book publication that directly supported it. The Devil's Due series that began publication a year before its launch was simply a continuation of the original Marvel series and was not intended to be a tie-in to the toy line's subsequent revival. As a result, the comics' creative team did not have the same pressure from Hasbro in tying up the comics with the toy line. However, several characters and designs from the toy line did manage to be incorporated into the comics and vice versa.

Starting with the second wave in 2002, carded figures included pamphlets that featured a mini-comic on one side and a product catalog on the other. All the mini-comics were written by Larry Hama, with the exception of "Valor vs. Venom: Part 1", which is attributed to Devil's Due Publishing with no particular writers credited, and the final comic, "Ninja Battles", which has no writing credits.

1. Bombs Bursting in the Air!!
2. Ninja Showdown
3. Chief Torpedo vs. Burn Out
4. Roadblock Gets Heavy
5. Tanks for Nothing
6. Face 2 Face
7. Valor vs. Venom: Part 1
8. Valor vs. Venom: Part 2: Dawn of the V-Troops
9. Secret Base
10. Cold Front
11. Nina Battles

== See also ==
- List of G.I. Joe series
