= G.I. Joe: Hall of Fame =

American toy line

- Type: Action Figures
- Company: Hasbro
- Country: United States
- Availability: 1991–1994
- Official website

The Hasbro G.I. Joe Hall of Fame era of 12" action figures began in 1991, when Hasbro released the Target Exclusive Duke in response to the high demand from nostalgic collectors of the vintage era G.I. Joe action figures. Duke was the first 12 in (30 cm) action figure produced in the Hasbro G.I. Joe line since 1978. During the G.I. Joe Hall of Fame era, Hasbro introduced several new products to the world of action figure collectibles. The first innovation was the limited edition, individually numbered collectible figures. These figures had collectors scrambling to find the lowest numbers which were expected to have the highest resale value. Hasbro also used variant sets (also known as chase sets) to increase demand and interest in the figures. Additionally, talking voice chips were used in some figures; and limited edition action figure sets were released for the Street Fighter II video game and movie characters, and also for the Mortal Kombat characters.

During the Hall of Fame era, Hasbro usually issued its G.I. Joe sets three times per year; with the largest amount of figures, vehicles, clothing, and gear sets being issued around October, in time for the holiday season. Then during spring and summer, smaller waves (usually mini-sets) of figures, clothing, and gear would be released. The Hall of Fame era ended in 1994 when G.I. Joe released its 30th Anniversary Commemorative sets which featured a new body style based on the Action Man sets that were being sold in Europe.

The Street Fighter, 30th Anniversary (12"), and Limited Exclusives are to be found on this page; they all share the basic figure developed as the Hall of Fame.

== James DeSimone ==
During the fourteen years that G.I. Joe had not existed as a 12" action figure, James DeSimone had been touring toy shows all over the United States buying and selling G.I. Joe action figures. In the mid-1980s, DeSimone created the G.I. Joe Collectors Club, which was a throw-back to the original G.I. Joe Collectors Clubs that had existed during the vintage era of the 12" figures (1964–1978). The DeSimone version of the club existed as a newsletter to which thousands of nostalgic collectors subscribed.

As a result of DeSimone's efforts to organize the G.I. Joe collectors, Hasbro licensed DeSimone's G.I. Joe Collectors Club. Hasbro also licensed DeSimone to promote official G.I. Joe Conventions during the early 1990s. After Hasbro began collaborating with DeSimone, Hasbro executives realized that there was an untapped market of nostalgic collectors who had grown up on the original G.I. Joe and who wanted more. During the 1980s, the prices of vintage toys and especially G.I. Joe had increased astronomically because the demand for vintage toys like G.I. Joe and Captain Action far outstripped the supply. Thus began Hasbro's plan to revive the 12" G.I. Joe action figure with the Hall of Fame line.

Hasbro honored DeSimone's contributions by acknowledging his assistance on the back cover of every Hall of Fame G.I. Joe's box. The back covers of each box also included a file card for each figure (just as the 3.75" line did) and a photo of the new figure along with the photo of a similar figure from DeSimone's collection of the vintage era of G.I. Joe (1964–1978).

During the era that DeSimone was running the unlicensed G.I. Joe Collectors Club, he issued two collecting and identification guides which had hundreds of photos of the 3.75 inches (9.5 cm) G.I. Joe: A Real American Hero figures in full color along with their file cards. In 1994, DeSimone created the Hasbro-authorized "The New Official Identification Guide To G.I. Joe 1964-1978" (ISBN 0-9635956-1-X), which was the first full color photo guide to the action figures, vehicles, gear, outfits, and play-sets that were produced during the original era of the 12" G.I. Joe.

== Target-exclusive Duke ==
Target Exclusive Duke

The first 12" Duke was a Target Stores exclusive. The popularity of the figure convinced Hasbro to unleash a new series of 12" G.I. Joe action figures, known as the Hall of Fame series. These new 12" figures were based on the G.I. Joe: A Real American Hero series of 3.75" action figure characters that had represented the spirit of G.I. Joe since they were introduced in 1982.

The Real American Hero series had spawned comic books and cartoons, and Hasbro hoped that the Hall of Fame line would have crossover appeal to the collectors of the 3.75" figures, and also the nostalgia appeal to the earlier generations that had grown up on the original G.I. Joe and the G.I. Joe Adventure Team. To accentuate that this figure would have a high collectible value, Hasbro introduced a gold seal over the end flaps of the boxes. Each figure was also individually numbered on their backs by computer scanning. The individual numbering created a buying frenzy among collectors who erroneously believed that finding figures with the lowest numbers would make them more valuable.

The Target Exclusive Duke had a headsculpt that was never used again for any other G.I. Joe figure. The Target Duke was dressed for Desert Storm combat, and he included a backpack, commemorative stand, a light-up weapon with sound effects, dog tags, a knife with sheath, and a 9 mm handgun with holster.

== First wave ==
In 1992, Hasbro released the first wave of the new 12" G.I. Joe Hall of Fame action figures. These four figures were Stalker, Cobra Commander, Snake Eyes, and a new version of Duke. The new version of Duke (2nd Edition) had a different headsculpt from the Target Exclusive Duke (1st Edition). The Snake Eyes figure introduced a new variation on the trademark G.I. Joe scar by putting the scar over the figure's left eye instead of on his right cheek as had traditionally been the case during the vintage era (1964–1978) of G.I. Joe.

The first wave of the Hall of Fame deluxe figures also had a different body from the Target Exclusive Duke. The Target Duke had a body similar to a Mattel Ken doll, except the arms and legs were thicker and made of rubber covering a bendable plastic frame. The new bodies were changed to look more muscular and defined than the Target Duke. The Target Duke also had open hands which did not grip the enclosed weapons and gear very well. The first wave of Hall of Fame figures corrected this defect by giving the figures gripping hands that were similar to the 1970s Kung-Fu Grip that the G.I. Joe and Action Man figures shared. These sets were priced at $19.99 at the time.

== Second wave ==
About six months later, Hasbro issued two new figures, Grunt and Heavy Duty. These were basic figures that were only equipped with a plastic M-16, helmet, T-shirt, pants, boots and dogtags. These basic figures led the way for the second wave of deluxe figures which featured Ace, Storm Shadow, Destro, and Gung-Ho.

Ace was a particular stand-out from that wave because he was a pilot, which was one of the most popular themes from the vintage era. Gung-Ho was issued with a limited edition gold sword (the chase set) and the rest of the run was with a silver sword. Gung-Ho was issued in a Marine Corps dress uniform, which evoked memories of the popular Marine Corps set from the vintage era. Destro was the figure which owed the most to the vintage era Bulletman character. Bulletman had not only been a 1940s comic book character, but the chrome-plated figure had also been part of the last wave of the vintage G.I. Joe Adventure Team. Just like the vintage Bulletman, Destro's chrome-plated mask was removable. Storm Shadow was the ninja-trained arch-enemy of Snake-Eyes. As with the first wave, all of these figures were based on characters that were part of the G.I. Joe: A Real American Hero cartoons and comic books.

=== The last waves ===
A few months after the second wave of figures was released, G.I. Joe issued Combat Camo Duke and Combat Camo Roadblock, which were both figures whose body color changed to exhibit camouflage paint patterns when they were dipped in cold or warm water. These were basic figures like Grunt and Heavy Duty, and only cost around $7.99 at the time. A few months later Rock N Roll and Major Bludd were issued as deluxe sets. Rock N Roll was the first 12" G.I. Joe since the 1970s to have a flocked hair and beard. Rock N Roll was also issued in with a tan shirt and also a limited edition green shirt which was the variant chase set.

About six months later, Electronic Battle Command Duke, Karate-Choppin' Snake-Eyes, Rapid-Fire, and Flint were issued. Electronic Battle Command Duke used the same headsculpt as the Duke from the first wave, but he had a Vietnam era camouflage uniform and a talking voice chip that allowed the battery-operated figure to speak over a thousand phrases. Electronic Battle Command Duke was originally priced at $39.99, which was unheard of at the time for toy action figure.

== Vehicles and gear sets ==
At some point after the first wave of Hall of Fame G.I. Joe sets were issued, Hasbro began releasing clothing and gear sets for the 12"G.I. Joe line. Some of these sets were issued as part of the Kenner line when Hasbro briefly transferred the G.I. Joe franchise to their Kenner sub-division. Also during this period, G.I. Joe issued the Rhino Jeep and the Strike-Cycle which had a transport trailer that attached to the back of the Rhino Jeep. The Strike Cycle was released at the same time as the Flint action figure, and the illustration on the cover of the box showed Flint riding the motorcycle.

== Mortal Kombat series ==
A series of 12" Mortal Kombat action figures were issued by Hasbro in 1993, a few months before the movie adaptation was to be released. The figures were based on the characters of Rayden, Johnny Cage, and Scorpion from the original video game. The line was not officially labeled as part of G.I. Joe, but was produced in the same manner as G.I. Joe figures.

== 30th Anniversary sets - 12" Salute (1994) ==
in 1994, limited edition sets are released with recreations of the original G.I. Joe, using the HOF body and the head sculpt subsequently used for the HOF limited edition sets described below. The supplied accessories are all oversize, as with all HOF sets. A reproduction of the original figure box was included. These sets were marketed as collectibles, implying that they would have the high market value typically associated with the much sought after original G.I. Joe. The reality is somewhat different, since the value of the originals was largely based on nostalgia for the then 30- to 40-year-olds for the high production quality of the vintage line. The high play value content associated with the original was lacking from the new out of scale, limited articulation figure; it was in many ways a step backwards in terms of quality and attention to detail. The intention of this product was simply to cash in on the expanding collectibles market.

== Limited editions (1995-97) ==
Prior to the release of the Classic Collection, Hasbro offered a small series of limited store release editions in the vein of the early 60's boxed figures with wood grain background. The basic figures were Dress Marine (Toys"R"Us), Battle of the Bulge (Target), Home for the Holidays Soldier (not shown), and Military Police (Kaybee Toys), with three ethnic variations of the MP, and two variations of Marine, and Soldiers. There were some even more limited market World War II commemorative releases; Action Soldier, Action Sailor, Action Pilot, Action Marine Target (versions shown, all blond hair), Navy Admiral and others. FAO Schwarz offered the premium Navy Seal with working raft. The uniforms were for the most part thin fabric; the KayBee toys MP however, was specified in a heavy fabric closer to the 60s vintage outfit.

The figure was no different from the basic limited articulation Hall of Fame body, but came with a re-sculpted head similar in design to the vintage G.I. Joe; the neck post was also able to swivel rather than just rotate left/right. The trademark covered the entire buttocks; "© Hasbro Inc, Pawtucket RI 02862, Made in China, C 0223" and additionally, there was often a serial number on the lower back. Some packages came with a more articulated body, shown below. This was marked "© Hasbro Industries 1993" across the upper buttocks.
