= G.I. Joe: Masterpiece Edition =

Action figure series

- Type: Action Figures
- Company: Hasbro
- Country: United States
- Availability: 1996–1997
- Official website

G.I. Joe: Masterpiece Edition is an action-figure-and-book set packaged by Chronicle Books.

== Introduction ==
The brainchild of John Michlig, the Masterpiece Edition package presented a book/figure set for each of the original 1960s Hasbro G.I. Joe line; Action Soldier, Action Sailor, Action Marine and Action Pilot. The book contained in each had a jacket that pictured the specific figure accompanying the book. Chronicle books published the set, and Don Levine, the driving force behind the original Hasbro product, provided much material for the book. The book outlines the development and history of the original articulated action figure in the form of an oral history, providing information and anecdotes previously unpublished. John Michlig further expanded on this topic in G.I. Joe: The Complete Story of America's Favorite Man of Action, also published by Chronicle books in 1998.

A substantial pre-sale to Target Stores made possible four different reproductions of the G.I. Joe figure.

The G.I. Joe Masterpiece Edition is credited by many for the revival of "classic G.I. Joe" by Hasbro via their Timeless Collection and 40th Anniversary collector's line, as well as an expansion of licensing opportunities related to qualities specific to the older figures.

The specific G.I. Joe Masterpiece Edition concept was later applied by Chronicle Books to other properties, including Batman, Superman, Star Wars and Star Trek.

== Volumes I through IV ==
Packaging the book and figure in a manner consistent with the original Hasbro offerings was essential to Michlig's concept. The original graphic and customized logo for each figure is prominently displayed on each boxes cover and end plate. An issue with the first volume, the Action Soldier, was a fungus (Eurotium chevalieri) that caused mold to develop on the clothing; apparently the clothing was not sprayed with an anti-fungal at one production factory in China. The package design, wherein the front and back cover protrude around the casing containing the book and figure, mimicking an actual book has proved to be problematic; vertical shelf storage will allow the weight of the center casing to pull away from the binding. The focus was on the book, so the package did not include a reproduction of the original figure box, just the items that were included: clothed figure, boots, cap, insignia decals and manual.

== Figures ==
The figure is a reproduction of the action figure Hasbro had patented during the 60s; patent #3,277,602, invented by Sam Speers. The original patent drawings can be viewed by searching the US Patent and Trademark office ( a link is provided under references) free of charge.

The reproduction figures themselves had quality control issues, it was not uncommon for these figures to have stress cracks, and the vinyl used for the hands was of a harder nature than the original, causing fingers to snap off on occasion. Since this was never intended to be sold as a toy for young children (as were the original 1960s figures), it is quite likely that many damaged figures were never removed from the packaging. The figure was a little shorter overall than the original 1960s figure, and all the limbs, torso & pelvis were just very slightly different from the original figures. This reproduction figure became the basis for the Hasbro G.I. Joe: Timeless Collection series, which had a less pink and shiny skin tone, and a revised knee pivot that prevented the calf from forward over-extension. The trademarking is in the same location as the vintage figure.

== Packaging design ==
Example of one of the four volumes originally released at roughly the same time, although not all retail locations had all editions. The cover photo, although dressed to match the branch of military, pictured only the black haired figure, even though the actual figures matched hair coloration typical of original releases; Black or Brown Army, Brown or Red Marine, Blonde Pilot, and Brown or Red Sailor. The figures were dressed in the appropriate replicas of the original outfits - all shirts were tagged "G.I. Joe by Hasbro, China". None of the outfits had pockets.

== Special editions ==
As with other G.I. Joe products, FAO Schwarz offered a "limited edition" run of 15,000 units on a Masterpiece Edition G.I. Joe Astronaut Book & Figure set, created to coincide with the G.I. Joe Collector's Convention that was being held on Florida's Space Coast in 1996. The enclosed figure was not limited to the blond typically associated with the original Hasbro pilot/astronaut.

Barnes & Noble book sellers offered the African American version of Action Soldier; as with the Astronaut, the packaging did not have a volume number.

== See also ==
- Action Man

== Bibliography ==
- DePriest, D. (1999) "The Collectable G.I. Joe" (ISBN 0-7624-0536-8)
- Michlig, J. (1998) "G.I. Joe; The Complete Story of America's Favorite Man of Action" (ISBN 0-8118-1822-5)
- United States Patent and Trademark Office
