= Duke (G.I. Joe) =

Fictional character from the G.I. Joe franchise

- G.I. Joe character
- First appearance: 1983
- Voiced by: Michael Bell (Sunbow); Ted Harrison (DiC series); John Payne (Spy Troops & Valor vs. Venom); Frank Frankson (Sigma 6); Steve Blum (Resolute); Jason Marsden (Renegades); Skeet Ulrich (Robot Chicken); Ian James Corlett (G.I. Joe: Operation Blackout); Sean Chiplock (Smite)

In-universe information
- Affiliation: G.I. Joe
- Specialty: First Sergeant
- File name: Hauser, Conrad S.
- Birth place: St. Louis, Missouri
- SN: RA 213-75-7793
- Rank: E-8 (First Sergeant); E-9 (Sergeant Major) (1997); E-5 (Sergeant) (Renegades); O-6 (Colonel) (IDW comics)
- Primary MOS: Airborne Infantry
- Secondary MOS: Small Arms/Artillery
- Subgroups: Tiger Force; Star Brigade; Anti-Venom Task Force

Duke is a fictional character from the G.I. Joe: A Real American Hero toyline, comic books, and animated series. He is the G.I. Joe Team's First Sergeant, and debuted in 1983. The character is also featured in both the G.I. Joe: Sigma 6 animated series and comic books. Channing Tatum portrays Duke in the 2009 live-action film, G.I. Joe: The Rise of Cobra, and the 2013 sequel G.I. Joe: Retaliation and by Bradley Cooper in the upcoming 2028 reboot.

== Profile ==
Duke is the code name of First Sergeant Conrad S. Hauser, and was born in St. Louis, Missouri. He is a skilled polyglot, being fluent in English, French and German, as well as several Southeast Asian languages. He was at the top of his class at Fort Benning, attended U.S. Army Special Language school, has undergone Special Forces training, and worked with South Vietnamese tribesmen. He was also an instructor in four different Special Forces schools. Despite his accomplishments, he has repeatedly turned down any officer commissions offered to him. He believes a commander's place is with his troops, not behind the battle lines.

Duke is field commander and second-in-command of the G.I. Joe team after Hawk. In this role, he has served as a rugged leader by example, a precise giver of orders, a source of history and knowledge, and a fair settler of disputes. As the team has fluctuated in size and structure over the years, Duke has supervised the training of the non-commissioned officers in G.I. Joe, as well as leading special units such as Tiger Force and Star Brigade.

After the G.I. Joe Team disbanded, Duke disappeared. It was later learned that he had been performing Black Ops for a secret government agency, his missions of which are still highly classified. One such mission was to locate and detain the mercenary Major Bludd, which led to evidence that Cobra Commander had returned, and hastened the reinstatement of G.I. Joe. Duke returned to active duty in G.I. Joe when the team was reinstated, though his maverick and dangerous behavior took some of his longtime colleagues by surprise, and caused him to relinquish his position as field commander for a more behind-the-scenes advisory role.

== Toys ==
=== Vintage/Modern ===
Duke was one of the first mail-away figures created in 1983 for the G.I. Joe 3 3/4" action figure line of G.I. Joe: A Real American Hero. He was later released as a carded figure in 1984, as part of the third series. The figure was recolored and released as the leader of the "Tiger Force" line in 1988.

A new version of Duke was released in 1992. Another version was released as part of the Battle Corps line in 1993. New versions of Duke were also released in 1993 and 1994, as commander of the Star Brigade line.

A version of Duke with no accessories came with the Built to Rule Armadillo Assault, which followed the G.I. Joe: Spy Troops story line. The forearms and the calves of the figure sported places where blocks could be attached. The same figure was recolored and released in 2005 with the Built to Rule Freedom Defense Outpost.

=== Hall of Fame ===
In response to the high demand from nostalgic collectors of the vintage era G.I. Joe action figures, Hasbro introduced the G.I. Joe: Hall of Fame era of 12" action figures in 1991. Duke was the first 12 in (30 cm) action figure produced in the Hasbro G.I. Joe line since 1978.

The first 12" Duke was a Target Stores exclusive. The popularity of the figure convinced Hasbro to unleash a new series of 12" G.I. Joe action figures, known as the Hall of Fame series. These new 12" figures were based on the G.I. Joe: A Real American Hero series of 3.75" action figure characters. The 12" Duke had a headsculpt that was never used again for any other G.I. Joe figure, and was dressed for Desert Storm combat, with a backpack, commemorative stand, a light-up weapon with sound effects, grenades, and a Beretta handgun and holster.

=== 25th anniversary ===
Duke was released in a box packed with Snake Eyes, Scarlett, Roadblock, and Gung-Ho, created from an entirely new mold that was based heavily on the original design. He was also released in several single packs (with one including his Jet Pack featured in the opening credits of G.I. Joe: The Movie), comic packs, movie packs (packaged with the greatest battles DVD), and multi-packs. Duke was one of the only G.I. Joe figures to be released in a special package for the G.I. Joe: Resolute animated series.

=== The Rise of Cobra ===
To coincide with the launch of the movie G.I. Joe: The Rise of Cobra, Hasbro released at least two figures in 2009 based on the Duke movie character. For both releases, he is listed as Conrad "Duke" Hauser. The first, classified as "Desert Ambush", features Duke in a desert camouflage uniform. The second, classified as "Reactive Impact Armor", features him in the movie style black uniform. Two versions of Duke were also released as part of "The Pursuit of Cobra" line in 2010, with non-actor based heads.

=== 30th Anniversary ===
The G.I. Joe: Renegades version of Duke was released as an action figure in 2011, as part of the 30th Anniversary line. Three versions of Duke were released in 2012, the last one listed again as Conrad "Duke" Hauser to tie in with the movie G.I. Joe: Retaliation.

=== G.I. Joe Classified Series ===
Q2 of 2020 sees the release of G.I. Joe Classified Series, a new line of highly articulated 6-inch scale action figures that includes prominent characters like Duke. This line features premium deco, detailing, articulation, and classic design updated to bring the classic characters into the modern era, plus accessories inspired by each character's rich history.

== Comics ==
=== Marvel Comics ===
In the Marvel Comics G.I. Joe series, Duke first appears in issue #22. He and Roadblock act as security for the funeral of General Flagg, shooting down an attacking Rattler plane. Duke is added to the G.I. Joe team line-up, to help straighten the team out and become the new field commander. His first mission is surveillance of the Baroness and Major Bludd at the Bern Institute of Reconstructive Surgery in Switzerland. A major battle results in the capture of Cobra Commander. Duke leads an effort to keep Cobra Commander prisoner in a mountain base. However, the Cobra ninja Storm Shadow rescues the Commander.

Duke then traveled down to Florida, where he and Roadblock met up with Cutter and Deep Six, taking the W.H.A.L.E. hovercraft and attacking Zartan's swamp shack hideout in the Florida Everglades. After Destro and Firefly steal the W.H.A.L.E., Duke and Wild Bill take the Dragonfly copter to go after Destro and recover the vehicle. In the opening ceremony of the new Pit headquarters, Hawk chooses Duke as the new field commander and the top sergeant of the G.I. Joe team. His next field mission is to investigate a suspected Cobra undercover agent on Staten Island. The agent escapes, but leaves behind clues to a secret Cobra operation in the Gulf of Mexico. Duke leads an assault team on the newly formed Cobra Island, but is forced to withdraw when the island is officially recognized as a sovereign state.

Duke takes part in the invasion of the Cobra-controlled town of Springfield, as the leader of the Security Team. He also plays second-in-command to Hawk during the Cobra Civil War. After that mission, Duke spends some time training new members of the Joe team. His next mission involves leading a team to push Cobra out of Trucial Abysmia, but intelligence vastly underestimates Cobra's presence there. Duke's squad is captured, and a misinterpreted order leads to several men being shot dead by a S.A.W. Viper. Doc, Heavy Metal, Thunder, and Crankcase are slain immediately. The Viper is wounded, and the survivors escape in a Cobra Rage tank. It is destroyed, killing Crazylegs, Breaker, and Quick Kick. Duke and the other two survivors, Cross-Country and Lt. Falcon, make it back to friendly lines safely.

Duke would recover from that experience and lead the defense of the Joe headquarters, The Pit, against Cobra. He also led a covert mission to Cobra Island, to oust control of it by Firefly and the Red Ninjas. As leader of Star Brigade, Duke teamed up with the Oktober Guard to destroy an asteroid threatening Earth. He would continue working with G.I. Joe until its disbandment.

In an interview in ToyFare magazine, G.I. Joe comic book writer Larry Hama admitted he could never get a handle on Duke. According to Hama, military comic book conventions maintain that the commanding officer is the "good cop" and the first sergeant is the "bad cop," and Duke, as first sergeant, never really fit the "bad cop" mold.

=== Devil's Due ===
After the disbandment, Duke went to take on black ops assignments for a secret government agency for a few years. It was during one of his missions that he discovers Cobra's attempt to make a comeback. He uses this information to help rally the effort to have G.I. Joe reinstated. By this time, Duke had a different edge to him, taking more risks and sometimes putting teammates in danger.

Duke returns as the team's field commander, leading a team to defend Washington D.C. when Cobra threatens the world with nanomites. Later, Flint and the Baroness are both kidnapped by the same organization in Czechoslovakia. Destro and Duke arrange for G.I. Joe, Cobra and the Oktober Guard to team up, in order to rescue them. When Hawk is incapacitated in a Cobra assassination attempt, Duke takes up his injured mentor's causes, fighting the corrupt Jugglers while holding the team together in the wake of the loss of their leader.

==== America's Elite ====
The team is reorganized in the G.I. Joe: America's Elite series. Duke disappears, going off on his own mission to locate Cobra Commander. During his search, he is captured by a group of B.A.T.s under the control of a Crimson Guardsman, who also had a grudge against Cobra Commander and wished to locate him. Duke frees himself, and after much torture, kills the Guardsman and saves Washington D.C. from being nuked. Civilians then treat his wounds and help him return home. Duke also assists his colleagues in defending their Yellowstone base from enemy infiltration.

Following the invasion of The Rock, General Rey goes on a sabbatical to fill in some of the holes in his memory, and Duke accompanies him because he does not trust his intentions. They discover that Zandar was involved, and travel to the Florida Everglades, where they learn that one of Zandar's aliases was hired to broker a deal between The Coil and the Jugglers. This leads them to General Rey's psychiatrist Dr. Scott Stevens, who reveals that General Rey is a clone of Serpentor. Dr. Stevens is then revealed to be Cobra hypnotist Crystal Ball, who has brainwashed General Rey, and commands him to kill Duke. General Rey breaks free from Crystal Ball's control with Duke's help.

Later, Duke deals with his father, a protester who dislikes the military. During a talk in his father's home, Cobra agent Interrogator captures Duke and tries to obtain information on G.I. Joe's Middle East operations. After being rescued by Roadblock, Duke leads battles against The Plague in both the Middle East and in New York during "World War III".

Hasbro later announced that all stories published by Devil's Due Publishing are no longer considered canonical, and are now considered an alternate continuity.

==== IDW Publications ====
In this continuity, Duke has been promoted to colonel after General Hawk is dismissed and is now the leader of the G.I. Joe team.

=== Alternate universe series ===
==== G.I. Joe vs. the Transformers II ====
A scientific accident eventually sends a small group of Joe and Cobra soldiers twenty years into the future. Older Duke is there, having lost all but his right arm. He leads the last remnants of human resistance against Shockwave's army. This Duke has no consideration for what the time travelers has to say and this narrow thinking threatens the entire timestream.

==== G.I. Joe Reloaded ====
In this series, Duke is a double agent working for Cobra, due to his distress over the U.S. government's willingness to create destructive weaponry. In the final issue, he confronts Scarlett in a sewer system. She gains the upper hand and kills him with a knife to the back.

In the mirror universe "Shattered Glass" created by Fun Publications, Duke's counterpart is Secretary of Defense Conrad Hauser, serving in the administration of U.S. President Joe Colton. In the story "Eye in the Sky", Hauser had to report to the president on the loss of an orbital defense satellite to the evil alien robots called the Autobots, and its eventual destruction thanks to the efforts of the heroic Decepticons.

== Animated series ==
=== A Real American Hero ===
In the first G.I. Joe miniseries The MASS Device, Duke is the field leader of G.I. Joe, under the command of General Flagg. Though the comic books and file cards say Duke is from St. Louis, Missouri, The MASS Device miniseries said that Duke was from Iowa. By the beginning of the first season of G.I. Joe, the role of commanding officer frequently alternated between Duke and Flint, the warrant officer who was introduced in The Revenge of Cobra miniseries. This was due in part to the series writers trying to balance the regulation of characters, based on the prominence of their action figures. In the first-season episode "The Synthoid Conspiracy", Duke was taken prisoner by Cobra and replaced with a synthetic doppelgänger known as a synthoid, in an attempt to get the G.I. Joe team disbanded permanently.

In the second season, Hawk replaces Duke as commander of G.I. Joe. Duke becomes second-in-command, while Flint is the third man down. Duke also appears briefly alongside Torpedo in one of the series' public service announcements about the dangers of swimming alone. Duke was voiced by Michael Bell.

==== G.I. Joe: The Movie ====
In G.I. Joe: The Movie, Duke tests the Broadcast Energy Transmitter (B.E.T.) in the Himalayas. He is responsible for foiling Cobra's first attempt to take over the B.E.T. by using it against Cobra and defeating Serpentor. Duke reprimands Lt. Falcon for neglecting his guard duty, which allows the captured Serpentor to escape with the aid of Cobra-La and the Dreadnoks. However, Duke later spares Falcon from a harsh punishment at a court martial, revealing he is the older half brother of Falcon. In Cobra's second attempt to obtain the BET machine, Duke is critically wounded while protecting Falcon when Serpentor impales him in battle. Scarlett holds him as he asks Falcon to become a better soldier before slipping into a coma. This makes the second time that Duke has lapsed into a coma - the first being in "The Traitor" two-part story, where his condition prevents him from letting the other Joes in on Dusty's triple-agent status.

Duke's original fate in the movie was to die at the hands of Serpentor. However, due to fan backlash regarding the death of the Autobot leader Optimus Prime in The Transformers: The Movie, Hasbro asked for a re-edit, so Duke would merely fall into a coma following Serpentor's venomous attack, and a later edit added dialogue near the end of the movie, indicating Duke recovered from his injuries.

=== Spy Troops and Valor vs. Venom ===
Duke appeared in the direct-to-video CGI animated movies G.I. Joe: Spy Troops and G.I. Joe: Valor vs. Venom, voiced by John Payne.

=== Sigma 6 ===
In G.I. Joe: Sigma 6, Duke is the leader of the G.I. Joe team. He has retained much of his personality from the A Real American Hero series. albeit looking much younger and with a new haircut. One other physical differentiation of this Duke from previous continuities, is the scar on his right cheek. He is still willing to go into the most dangerous situations, rather than send a member of his team to do it. This Duke is much more comfortable being the military man than engaging in social situations, as seen in the first-season episode "Vacation".

=== Resolute ===
Duke appeared in G.I. Joe: Resolute, in which he was voiced by Steve Blum. He and the other Joes learn of Cobra Commander's latest scheme to take over the world with a particle superweapon, sending his various underlings across the globe to ensure its success. In the course of the storyline, Duke presents Scarlett with an ultimatum, to go with Snake Eyes or to remain with him, and she chooses to be with Duke. Later on while on a mission in Siberia, Duke gets injured fighting Zartan and orders Scarlett to leave him. She refuses and replies: "Oh, to hell with your orders! It's taken me years to sort out in my head what I want - who I want - and today I did. I'm staying with you, for all the time I have left. And if that's only six minutes, then damn it, I'm spending my last six minutes with you!" After the duo are picked up by Ripcord, Duke makes a vow to kill Cobra Commander for his actions over the course of the story, and leads the assault on the Cobra base in Springfield. He manages to get to the control room for the weapon, where the Commander gloats behind a bunker window that the weapon can't be stopped from firing on Washington D.C. Duke instead redirects the weapon to fire at the Springfield base, and though the area is decimated and the Joes evacuated, a field report at the end of the miniseries reveals in a return to the site, Duke found the bunker that Cobra Commander took shelter in to be empty.

=== Renegades ===
In G.I. Joe: Renegades, Duke is a younger, and far more aggressive version than his other incarnations. Duke is a member of command staff, and makes the decision to expose the Cobra mega-corporation's true basis at cost, which results in them being branded as criminals following the destruction of Cobra Pharmaceuticals. He is also humble and selfless; during training Duke saves a fellow cadet who had stepped on a pressure-activated land mine, with Duke taking the small blunt of the blast scarring his back in the process. Duke also turns down an accommodation and a medal ceremony.

In the two-part episode "Homecoming," a flashback revealed that Duke was on a football team in his youth and went up against the football team that Flint was a part of. A play that Flint did ended up breaking Duke's leg costing him his college scholarship. A later encounter with Flint had Duke being given the offer to join the military. When he was assigned to work with Stalker to thwart a weapons trade held by M.A.R.S. Industries, Duke ended up disobeying orders when a M.A.R.S. Operative shoots down a helicopter that Lady Jaye was on and ended up saving her and the pilot.

In the present, Duke splinters from the others when his parents Max and Connie are captured. During that time, he did have some problems with his brother Vince who was shown displeased with what happened at Cobra Pharmaceuticals and stated that their parents are in doubt about what happened. After Duke saves his parents and reunites with the other Joes, they arrive at the Hauser household where Connie wanted to treat them to a meal. Unfortunately, Vince had called Flint after he had warned Duke to stay away. Duke ends up defending his actions towards the other Joes and tells Flint upon the group's arrest to see that their families are protected.

In the season finale, he obtains his trademark scar across his right eye as a result of a fight with Cobra Commander.

== Live action film ==
Duke
- G.I. Joe character
- First appearance: 2009
- Portrayed by: Channing Tatum
- Voiced by: Roger Craig Smith (video game)

In-universe information
- Affiliation: G.I. Joe
- Specialty: Soldier
- File name: Conrad Hauser
- SN: 234-55-GI89
- Rank: O-3 (Captain) (Rise of Cobra); O-4 (Major) (Retaliation)
- Primary MOS: Intelligence and Infantry
- Series: G.I. Joe: The Rise of Cobra; G.I. Joe: Retaliation

=== G.I. Joe: The Rise of Cobra ===
Channing Tatum portrays Duke in the 2009 film G.I. Joe: The Rise of Cobra. He is the primary protagonist and is part of General Hawk's team. Contrary to his original back-story, he is a newcomer to the G.I. Joe team; all Joe rookies are already established, well-trained soldiers. Also in the 2009 film, Duke identifies himself as a captain, while conspicuously wearing the rank of Major (Army) or Lt. Commander (Navy), although all versions of his action figure have him graded at Major/O-4. There is no reference in the film to him ever performing duties as a First Sergeant. He was also engaged to marry Ana Lewis (who would end up becoming the Baroness), but left her at the altar because of guilt due to the apparent death of Ana's brother, Rex Lewis.

In the beginning of the film, Duke and Ripcord lead a convoy to deliver a case of nanomite warheads to the United Nations and North Atlantic Treaty Organization. They are ambushed by the soldiers led by the Baroness, whom Duke recognizes as his ex-fiancée, and are saved by a group of Joes. They take the warheads to The Pit. Duke reveals how he knows the Baroness, and through training, he becomes a member of the G.I. Joe team. During Cobra's infiltration of the Pit, Duke asks the Baroness to drop the case of warheads that she came for, and is unable to shoot her. Cobra soon launches an attack on the Joes, and the Baroness steals the warheads.

The Joes pursue the Baroness and Storm Shadow in Paris. Duke manages to shut down a warhead fired by Storm Shadow before the nanomites could spread through the city, but not before it destroys the Eiffel Tower, and is captured. He unsuccessfully tries to convince the Baroness to help him, also apologizing for his failure to protect Rex and abandoning her. He is taken to the laboratory of a masked man called The Doctor, who reveals he is Rex Lewis and that he has been controlling Ana with nanomites. The Doctor begins a process to turn Duke into a Neo-Viper, but Baroness comes to her senses and frees Duke. M.A.R.S. Industries leader James McCullen tries to kill him with a flamethrower, but Duke shoots it, disfiguring McCullen's face in the explosion. Duke and the Baroness then pursue the Doctor and McCullen, who later become Cobra Commander and Destro respectively. Along with the other Joes, they help defeat and imprison them. While Baroness waits for her nanomites to be removed, Duke and her share a kiss.

=== G.I. Joe: Retaliation ===
Tatum returns as Duke in the sequel, G.I. Joe: Retaliation, in which the character has become a captain and the leader of tactical operations and has been awarded his own team of Joes. In one mission, he leads the team to find a North Korean defector in the Korean Demilitarized Zone. Duke has also become friends with his second-in-command Roadblock; the two later play video games at the latter's house. Shortly after, Duke and the Joes are sent to Pakistan to retrieve nuclear warheads when the country is in a civil war. After saving Flint, Duke is killed off early in the film via an airstrike ordered by Zartan (who was masquerading as the President of the United States). Zartan is exposed and killed by Storm Shadow, Cobra Commander escapes, and G.I. Joe is reinstated. Roadblock vows to go after Cobra Commander and avenge Duke.

Director Jon M. Chu had stated that Duke may return in the third film, but this did not happen.

=== Untitled G.I. Joe reboot ===
Actor Bradley Cooper is cast as Duke for the new G.I. Joe Movie that will be co-written and directed by Danny McBride follow Duke and the team battling Cobra in their town of Springfield.

== Video games ==
Duke is one of the featured characters in the 1985 G.I. Joe: A Real American Hero computer game.

Duke is featured as a playable character in the 1991 G.I. Joe video game created for the Nintendo Entertainment System. He is also featured as a playable character in the 1992 game G.I. Joe: The Atlantis Factor, and in the G.I. Joe arcade game.

Duke appears as a playable character in the video game G.I. Joe: The Rise of Cobra and G.I. Joe: Operation Blackout.

== Other media ==
- Duke appeared in the Robot Chicken episode "More Blood, More Chocolate", voiced by Skeet Ulrich. In the "Inside the Battlefield: The Weather Dominator" segment, it is mentioned that he and Snake Eyes were captured by Cobra and forced to battle each other. A recurring gag in that segment is that Duke can't understand what Snake Eyes wrote on the Etch A Sketch. In "PS: Yes In That Way", Duke introduces the G.I. Joe team to the newest recruit named Calvin, and ends up nicknaming him "Fumbles" for his clumsiness. After another of Calvin's clumsy moments during the introduction, Duke makes "Fumbles" the team's janitor. When Calvin defects to Cobra and snipes the G.I. Joe team, Calvin only leaves Duke alive. In "The Ramblings of Maurice," he and the G.I. Joe members award Roadblock with a chocolate statue. After Junkyard eats the chocolate statue and dies, Duke speaks at Junkyard's funeral, and has Junkyard's name added to the Wall of Fallen Heroes. Amazed that Junkyard was the only name on the list, he bets that Cobra's Wall of Fallen Villains is full of names.
- Duke's romantic inclinations are touched on in the non-fiction paperback Saturday Morning Fever.
- Michael Bell reprises his role of Duke in the Community episode "G.I. Jeff."
