= G.I. Joe Adventure Team =

Line of Action Figures

- Type: Action Figures
- Company: Hasbro
- Country: United States
- Availability: 1970–1976
- Official website

G.I. Joe Adventure Team is a line of action figures produced by the toy company Hasbro. The line is well remembered by the inclusion of features such as Kung-Fu Grip, Life-Like Hair and Eagle Eyes.

== Vintage Adventure Team ==
Between 1970 and 1976, the Hasbro toy company in the United States released numerous sets of 1:6 scale, 12-inch (30 cm) (a.k.a. playscale) figures, vehicles, clothing, and gear sets which had an adventure theme. Evolving from the military theme that had inspired the original 1960s G.I. Joe action figure and the initial "Adventures of ..." releases of 1969, these figures and sets were usually dressed for adventures in the jungles, deserts, mountains, and oceans. The adversaries were ecological disasters and wild animals, rather than human beings. A shift in sensibilities among parents in the US, notably caused by the Vietnam War, caused a shift from action/military toys to more politically sensitive ones.

The "realistic hair" flocking techniques developed by Hasbro's UK licensee, Palitoy, allowed for a significant shift in identity for the toyline. Nearly every set dealt with exploring exotic locations or accomplishing dangerous environmentally sensitive missions. The Adventure Team era of G.I. Joe also featured such innovations as the Kung-Fu Grip; the flocked hair and bearded figures; and the figures with movable "Eagle-Eyes". "Eagle Eye" G.I. Joe was invented by James A. King in 1976 James A. King was a Master Engineer at Hasbro's R&D Dept in the mid-to-late 1970s and a top toy and consumer product inventor, designer and engineer under his own company King Design Associates, which produced additional G.I. Joe products and other toys for Hasbro.

The initial 1970 Adventure Team figures consisted of Talking Adventure Team Commander (Euro-American), Land Adventurer (Euro-American), Sea Adventurer (Euro-American), Air Adventurer (Euro-American), Adventurer (African-American), Man of Action (Euro-American), Talking Astronaut (Euro-American), Talking Man of Action (Euro-American), and Talking Adventure Team Commander (African-American). The second wave of figures in 1974 consisted of re-releases of the first nine figures which now included the "Kung-Fu Grip". The Mike Power-Atomic Man and Bulletman figures were released in order to compete with the popular Six Million Dollar Man figures and Mego's superhero figures released at the same time.

=== Intruders ===
A notable absence in G.I. Joe's early days was an antagonist (although a case can be made for the German, Japanese and Russian figures). In 1976, G.I. Joe and the Adventure Team met new foes from outer space, when The Intruders: Strong Men from Another World were introduced. The Hasbro story line was that the Intruders were super-strong, highly intelligent alien invaders bent on conquering the Earth. These armored caveman-like aliens, although smaller than the G.I. Joe figures, had a button on their backs which could be pressed to make them grab with their "Crusher Grip" arms. These were available in the bearded and gold-armored commander, and the beardless, silver-armored warrior.

== Adventure Team reproductions ==
An updated version of the Adventure Team appeared in the Classic Collection period, as well.

In the 2000s, Hasbro has taken a slightly different approach to making and marketing Adventure Team-themed figures. They have gone to specialty outlets to distribute the figures.

Throughout the 2000s, the G.I. Joe Collector club has reproduced several of the original figures and their collectible boxes. In addition, the Club has offered Club-designed Adventure Team-themed figures, accessory sets, and large-box Convention Collector sets.

The following sets and figures all used the Hasbro G.I. Joe 40th Anniversary Figure, with flocking and gripping hands added. Some of the reproductions today are still very valuable if still sealed in the box.

In 2004, the Meijer chain commissioned Hasbro to create two different, inexpensive Adventure Team-themed sets. These were the Land Adventurer and the Air Adventurer (although, the Sea Adventurer figure was actually included with the Air Adventurer set).

In 2006 Hot Topic offered the Land Adventurer in his retail box (often called a "coffin box" by G.I. Joe collectors due to its rectangular shape).

In 2007, Urban Outfitters offered two different Adventure Team-themed figures – the Land Adventurer (same as the Hot Topic figure and box) and the Air Adventurer (although the figure in the "coffin box" was actually the Sea Adventurer – just like with the larger Meijer's set from 2004).

In the fall of 2007, Wal-Mart offered a series of 5 Adventure Team figures: The Adventurer (African American), The Land, Air, and Sea Adventurers, and the Man of Action in vintage-style packages.

== Commander voice ==
The Talking Adventure Team Commander featured eight new voice commands, activated by a pull-string through the chest. The voice commands were:

- "I've got a tough assignment for you".
- "This is going to be rough. Can you handle it?"
- "We must get there before dark. Follow me".
- "The Adventure Team has the situation controlled".
- "Set up Team Headquarters here".
- "Contact Adventure Team Headquarters right away".
- "The Adventure Team is needed in Africa".
- "Mission accomplished. Good work men!"

== Body types ==
Over the course of the toylines' production run, there were four main body variations best identified as: Hard Hand, Kung Fu grip, Muscle Body and Muscle Body Eagle Eye. All have the flocked hair. There were Talker variations of each type. Early bodies had the trademark on the right buttock, and were assigned the patent #3,277,602, awarded to Sam Speers (inventor) for Hasbro on October 11, 1966. The later bodies were marked "Ⓒ 1975 Hasbro Pat Pend Pawt. R.I." or "Ⓒ 1975 Hasbro Ind Inc Pawtucket. R.I. 02861 Pat Pend Made In Hong Kong". This body style was redesigned by Alfred A. Crabtree, Brian S. Prodger and Hubert P. O'Connor, who applied for the patent in January 1976; it was assigned patent #3,988,855, "posable figure having one piece connector for torso, trunk and legs" on November 2, 1976. Kung Fu grip hands were made of a rubber prone to deterioration (being even thinner than the early Action Man variety), and often the hands are discolored, and the fingers will have broken off. These hands were a variation on the design by (Bill) William A.G. Pugh, of Hasbro's UK licensee, Palitoy, which was assigned a U.S. patent #3,955,312 "Gripping Hand For Dolls" on May 11, 1976.

Muscle Bodies relied on a rubber for all body joints, instead of elastic, and it is rare at this point to find original bodies that have not fallen apart due to rubber deterioration, but these bodies can be re-strung. Early-body Adventurers seem somewhat less prone to the stress cracking common with earlier painted head bodies. The muscle body type was still in production into the early nineties in Brazil, under Hasbro licensee Estrella. The last change was the addition of "Eagle Eyes", which followed later in 1976. Invented by George W. Ptaszek and James A. King, Hasbro applied for and received patent #4,005,545, "Eye shifting mechanism for doll construction" dated February 1, 1977. The design utilized a mechanism operated by a simple slide at the back of the head moves the gaze of the eyeballs back and forth. The head was predominantly available in brown and blonde hair and only blue eyes, with bearded versions of each, however there were rare red-bearded examples produced.

== Trademarks ==
Adventure Team bodies were trademarked in the same manner and location as pre-1970s G.I. Joe figures. It was not until the introduction of the muscle body, that the trademarking was moved to the lower back, as with Hasbro's UK licensee, Palitoy.

== Outfits ==
The Adventurer run had a wide range of outfits, and varying production qualities. Typically, early issues of clothing are of a heavier fabric, and have more detail.

== Footlocker ==
As with earlier G.I. Joe figures, the Adventure Team offered a footlocker towards the end of the run. In 1975, an all-plastic version was offered, with similar dimensions to the previous wooden versions. Plastic hinges, carry straps and clasp were utilized. The tray insert was the same yellow molded plastic as the 1960s version.

== Vehicles ==
A wide range of vehicles were produced for the Adventurer line; one of the most elaborate (and expensive) being the Mobile Support Vehicle. This vehicle in particular had the potential to provide a wide range of imaginative play value; it came with a range of accessories, and included a battery-operated radar scanner and a searchlight (not shown). The cab could hold two AT members on a mission. The line included several small sets at a price point that more kids might afford with their own allowance; ones that converted into backpacks, such as "Escape car". There were also a number of helicopter variations, a variety of one-man, six-wheeler "power hogs", an "Avenger Pursuit" multi-function vehicle, and a "Big Trapper" vehicle offered around the same time as the introduction of the "Intruder" figures. The military jeep was brought back, but was of the blow-mold construction typically associated with imitation products.

== Other media ==
=== Comics ===
==== Comic book advertisement (1975-1976) ====
Comic book advertisements featuring the original G.I. Joe, Atomic Man and Bulletman were published between 1975 and 1976.

==== IDW Publishing ====
In the Hasbro Comic Book Universe published by IDW Publishing, Adventure Team is composed of Joseph Colton, Miles "Mayhem" Manheim, Mike "Atomic Man" Power, Richard "Bulletman" Ruby, and Lonzo "Stalker" Wilkinson. On their mission to the Tomb of Amtoltec, they battled an army of robotic mummies, before having an encounter with the Decepticon named Soundwave. By the end of the search, the Adventure Team retrieved an ancient artifact they codenamed as the "Talisman".

== See also ==
- G.I. Joe
- Action Man

== Bibliography ==
- DePriest, D. (1999) "The Collectable G.I. Joe" (ISBN 0-7624-0536-8)
- Michlig, J. (1998) "G.I. Joe; The Complete Story of America's Favorite Man of Action" (ISBN 0-8118-1822-5)
- Marshall, J. (1997) "G.I. Joe and Other Backyard Heroes" (ISBN 0-7643-0201-9)
- DeSimone, J (1994) "The New Official Identification Guide To G.I. Joe 1964–1978" (ISBN 978-0-9635956-1-4)
- United States Patent and Trademark Office
