= G.I. Joe: Spy Troops =

- Directed by: Dale Carman
- Written by: Larry Hama
- Produced by: Daley Miller; Steve Drucker
- Starring: John Payne; Lisa Ann Beley; Michael Dobson; Scott McNeil
- Music by: John Hunter
- Production companies: Reel FX Creative Studios; Hasbro Entertainment
- Distributed by: Paramount Home Entertainment
- Release date: September 27, 2003
- Running time: 45 minutes
- Country: United States
- Language: English

G.I. Joe: Spy Troops is a 2003 American animated military science fiction action film produced by Reel FX Creative Studios and distributed by Paramount Home Entertainment.

The film was released direct-to-video and premiered on Cartoon Network on September 27, 2003. A sequel, titled G.I. Joe: Valor vs. Venom, was released on September 14, 2004.

== History ==
When Hasbro launched G.I. Joe vs. Cobra in 2002, an updated revival of the G.I. Joe: A Real American Hero toyline that was sold between 1982 and 1994, they commissioned Reel FX Creative Studios to produce a series of CGI-animated commercials to promote the new line of figures. They would follow this up with an hour-long direct-to-video movie titled Spy Troops to promote the 2003 series of figures released under the sub-line of the same name. Spy Troops was written by Larry Hama, who wrote the original filecards and the Marvel comic series.

== Plot ==
The plot revolves around G.I. Joe, America's "daring, highly trained special missions force". The Joes have just perfected a new technology: Mind Interface Remote Control (MIRC), which allows soldiers to flawlessly command vehicles from a safe distance. The title refers to the fact that the two opposing forces, the G.I. Joe Team and Cobra, make use of spies to achieve their objectives. Cobra sends Zartan, to infiltrate G.I. Joe headquarters posing as Shipwreck, and steal the MIRC technology. The Joes send Shipwreck and Snake Eyes to the enemy's camp, after learning about what happened. The Joes then organize an assault on Cobra Mountain and successfully regain the technology, destroying Cobra's base and chopper in the process.

== Cast ==
Actor	Role
John Payne	Duke
Matt Hill	Beach Head
Lisa Ann Beley	Scarlett
Lee Tockar	Shipwreck
Don S. Davis	Wild Bill
Mark Hildreth	Hi-Tech
Michael Dobson	Cobra Commander
Scott McNeil	Destro
Teryl Rothery	Baroness
Jim Foronda	Doctor Mindbender
Brian Dobson	Flint
Blu Mankuma	Heavy Duty
Peter Kelamis	Polly
Ty Olsson	Storm Shadow
Ward Perry	Agent Faces
Alessandro Juliani	Dusty
Colin Murdock	Zartan
Doron Bell Jr.	Tunnel Rat
Paul Dobson	Barrel Roll
Phil Hayes	Torpedo
Jake Parker	Snake Eyes

== Release ==
Spy Troops: The Movie was released on DVD in September 2003, with the 12" Ninja Showdown two-pack. It had a suggested retail price of $19.95. Later, it was also available alone, with a suggested retail price of $4.95. Cartoon Network premiered Spy Troops: The Movie on September 27, 2003 at 10:00 p.m.
