= G.I. Joe (1992 video game) =

1992 video game

- Arcade flyer
- Developer: Konami
- Publisher: Konami
- Composers: Tsutomu Ogura; Kenichiro Fukui
- Platform: Arcade
- Release: JP: 1992; NA: April 1992; EU: 1992
- Genres: Third-person, rail shooter, shoot-'em-up
- Modes: Single-player, multiplayer

G.I. Joe is a third-person rail shooter video game produced by Konami and released in 1992 for video arcades. It is based on the cartoon series G.I. Joe: A Real American Hero and stars four characters from the show: Duke, Snake Eyes, Scarlett, and Roadblock.

== Gameplay ==
The game is a third-person rail shooting game, in which each player chooses one of four G.I. Joe operatives: Duke, Snake Eyes, Scarlett, or Roadblock. Up to four people can play the game at once. Each character either stands or automatically runs forward in a 3D perspective, and their player can use the joystick to move them left or right as well as raise or lower an aiming crosshair: this allows for the latter's movement through most of the screen. Each character is armed with a gun that has unlimited ammunition, as well as a missile launcher which comes with 3 or 5 missiles and can hold up to nine.

Players use these weapons via a standard shoot button, and a missile launch button that allows for larger-scale destruction at the cost of one charge. Power-ups can be acquired that allow the player rapid fire by holding down the shoot button, add another missile to their supply, or restore their character's life energy.

The object of the game is to find Cobra's hidden stronghold and stop Cobra Commander's latest campaign to take over the world. There are three missions in the game, each composed of several areas, including a chemical plant, an air base, a weapon plant, a jungle, a cavern base, and a battleship. Enemies include Viper soldiers and various Cobra vehicles such as FANG II, HISS II, Razorback and Hurricane. The bosses consist of Tomax and Xamot, Metal-Head, The Baroness, Major Bludd and Destro, with the final battle taking place between the G.I. Joe team and Cobra Commander.

== Reception ==
RePlay reported G.I. Joe to be the seventh most-popular arcade game at the time. Computer and Video Games gave the arcade game a positive review in its July 1992 issue, scoring it 346 out of 400. Electronic Gaming Monthly also gave the arcade game a positive review in its October 1992 issue. AllGame gave the title a positive review as well.
