= G.I. Joe: America's Movable Fighting Man =

Line of action figures by Hasbro

- Original action figure
- Type: Action Figures
- Company: Hasbro
- Country: United States
- Availability: 1964–69
- Materials: Plastic
- Features: G.I. Joe

G.I. Joe: America's Movable Fighting Man is a line of action figures produced by Hasbro. The initial product offering represented four of the branches of the U.S. armed forces. The term G.I. stands, in popular usage, for Government Issue and became a generic term for U.S. soldiers (predating the action figures), especially ground forces. The term originated in WWI, when much of the government-issued equipment was stamped "G.I.", meaning that it was made from galvanized iron. The development of G.I. Joe led to the coining of the term "action figure".

== History ==
The Hassenfeld Brothers ("Hasbro") of Pawtucket, Rhode Island, began selling the first "action figure" targeted especially at boys in the early 1960s. The conventional marketing wisdom of the early 1960s was that boys would not play with dolls, thus the word 'Doll' was never used by Hasbro or anyone involved in the development or marketing of G.I. Joe. "Action figure" was the only acceptable term and has since become the generic description for any posable doll intended for boys. 'America's movable fighting man' is a registered trademark of Hasbro, and was prominently displayed on every boxed figure package.

The driving force behind the concept was Donald Levine, who in 1963 was creative director of Hasbro Toys. Stan Weston of Weston Merchandising Corp., a product development company, approached him with the idea of a military-based toy line that would include figures and many accessories. Stan Weston credits Larry Reiner, then head of the games division at Ideal Toys, with the notion of an articulated figure, based on conversations he had with Mr. Reiner regarding the concept. Sam Speers, then of Hasbro's product development team, is primarily credited with the specific almost 30 cm (12") tall articulated figure design as produced by Hasbro; his name appears on the patent # 3,277,602 "Toy figure having movable joints", assigned on October 11, 1966. The all-important packaging graphics were sub-contracted to Thresher and Petrucci Art Studio, a company based nearby that had previously produced freelance work for Hasbro.

The Hasbro prototypes were originally named "Rocky" (marine/soldier) "Skip" (sailor) and "Ace" (pilot), before the more universal name G.I. Joe was adopted. One of the prototypes would later sell in a Heritage auction in 2003 for $200,001.

The initial product offering featured members of the four branches of the armed forces as follows; Action Soldier, Action Sailor, Action Pilot and Action Marine, with accessory sets immediately available for each branch. It was correctly assumed that competitors would try to emulate or outright copy the concept, so the idea was to offer a broad range of accessory items from the very start.

The ongoing situation in Vietnam, and the growing anti-war sentiment of the late sixties signaled the end of the early years of G.I. Joe; by 1969, he was no longer a soldier/sailor/pilot/marine, but rather an Adventurer; he was marketed under the "Adventures of G.I. Joe, and the line consisted of Adventurer, black Adventurer, Aquanaut, and Talking Astronaut. Instead of military sets, the mostly recycled materials from earlier years were given names such as "Fight for Survival", "Danger of the Depths", "Mysterious Explosion", "Secret Mission to Spy Island" and "Mouth of Doom". Everything would change the following year, as G.I. Joe received lifelike hair and beards, courtesy of Hasbro's U.K. licensee Palitoy, leading to the creation of G.I. Joe Adventure Team toyline in the 1970s.

== Basic figure ==
The figure was loosely based on the artist's mannequins still available today; the basic figure had multiple points of articulation, previously not found in any children's toy. The advertising claimed "21 points of articulation", however, if one actually counts each individual pivot contact point, there are 19; head-to-neck, neck-to-torso, shoulder-to-torso (2), biceps-to-shoulder (2), elbow (2), wrist (2), torso-to-pelvis, hipball-to-pelvis (2), thigh-to-pelvis (2), knee (2) and ankle (2). The figure was held together by means of elastic, wire hooks and metal rivets. Pivot pins were made of a ribbed plastic, which was pressed into the adjacent limb section, allowing the limbs to rotate as well as hinge at pivot point. Even this specific method of attaching the appendages was patented as a "Connection For Use In Toy Figures" (patent # 3,475,042, October 28, 1969). The hip balls were made of a softer vinyl that allowed movement while retaining the surface friction required to maintain a pose. This level of attention to detail was costly to manufacture, and had caused product development no end of grief to devise, as simple as the result seemed. The fact that so many still exist intact after more than forty years is a testament to the production quality that Hasbro demanded of its manufacturing plants. Cheap imitations of Hasbro's product did not bother with such detail, resulting in figures that lacked anything like the poseability and longevity of G.I. Joe.

There were in fact a number of variations in construction and markings of the figure as produced in the first few years, the fine points of which can be found in the listed reference books. The most obvious are variations in the trademarking on the right buttock, three of which are not illustrated. Another obvious variation was the early bodies with slotted shoulder joints and smaller feet than those of just a year or two later. Others include less obvious variations in hand detailing, coloration and size; some early figures had no trademarkings at all; some have brass rivets on all or some of the joints. By now, many figures suffer from the effects of age, and exhibit stress cracks in some joints.

Four hair colors were offered in 1964: Blonde, Auburn (Red), Brown and Black. Eye colors were specifically matched to hair colors; Blonde and Brown hair came with brown eyes, Black and Auburn hair came with blue eyes. In 1965 an American-ethnic version of the basic soldier was offered; it was simply a caucasian feature figure molded in brown vinyl instead of the pink used otherwise. Some very early issue figures appear to have eyeliner, and these heads seem more prone to shrinkage than later variants. In 1966, a European "foreign" and Japanese head version was released, with the advent of the 6 "Action Soldiers of the World' releases. In 1967, talking variants were also released. Late Black, Red, Blonde and Brown talker heads were of a softer vinyl, essentially the same as those used for flocking in the Adventurer series introduced in 1970.

== Trademarks and copyrights ==
Aside from the obvious trademarking on the right buttock, other aspects of the figure were copyrighted features that allowed Hasbro to successfully pursue cases against producers of cheap imitations, since the human figure itself cannot be copyrighted or trademarked. The scar on the right cheek was one; another, unintentional at first, was the placement of the right thumbnail on the underside of the thumb. Early trademarking, with "G.I. Joe™", was used through some point in 1965; the markings changed once G.I. Joe was a registered trademark; "G.I. Joe®" now appears on the first line. Subsequently, the stamped trademarking was altered after the patent was granted (in late 1966), and assigned a number; 3,277,602. Figures with this marking would have entered the retail market during 1967. G.I. Joe figures manufactured in Canada, had two variants on the U.S. production of the first three types. The Canadian version pelvis has an extra ridge immediately above the buttocks. This mold was the version used by Palitoy (without the trademarkings) when Action Man was released in the UK market in 1966.

== Packaging ==
The original 1964 basic figures came in a lidded box with dynamic graphics that illustrated the specific branch of the military offered; the enclosed figure was not dressed as illustrated, but came with basic fatigues, boots, cap and dog tag as appropriate to the branch. The side panels of the box had photo illustrations of accessory sets available to fully kit out the enclosed figure, a well thought out marketing ploy (known in the industry as the 'razor and razor blade' concept, where the toy (the 'razor') is sold 'as-is' and consumers pay separately for the accessories (the 'blades')). The background coloration depended on the branch; wood grain was used for soldier/marine, bright yellow was used for pilot, and blue was used for sailor. A folded leaflet was included in the box that illustrated all four branches, and all accessories (similar to this 60s Action Man version), along with a user's manual. The basic figures were Action Soldier, Action Sailor, Action Pilot, Action Marine and an African American-ethnic variant (offered about a year after the original release).

The "Action Soldiers of the World" releases of 1966 came in deluxe and small sets. The six offerings were: German Soldier, British Commando, Russian Infantryman, Australian Jungle Fighter, Japanese Imperial Soldier, and French Resistance Fighter. The deluxe sets were a window box format that contained the dressed figure, and all the attendant accessories. Down the left side of the package was a dynamic graphic of the included figure in action, with the package contents listed below. The small sets were split between a narrow boxed-dressed figure with only helmet, appropriate jacket and trousers, and boots; and a separate carded set that included all the accessories/equipment to complete the set.

== Uniform and accessory items ==
G.I. Joe had a wealth of uniforms, weapons and equipment. Some came in deluxe sets with a figure, others were sold in carded uniform/accessory sets (40th anniversary sets for example), as with the soldiers of the world sets. Each branch of the U.S. military was represented with uniform/equipment sets; the navy sets included a frogman, with real rubber 3-piece wetsuit (jacket, trousers and hood); a deep sea diver, with rubberized suit, bell helmet, weights and other detailed accessories, a landing signal officer and others. The air force sets included a scramble pilot, pilot with working parachute, dress uniform and an astronaut with Mercury space capsule. The marines set included communications, paratrooper, beachhead assault, medic, and dress uniform. The army sets included military police, medic, radio operator, and ski/mountain troops. All authentic G.I. Joe clothing, and many of the early cloth accessory items, carried the "G.I. Joe™" or "G.I. Joe®" tag sewn into the neck of shirts and jackets, the inseam of pants, the left or right inseam of sweaters, and so on. Early items were produced in Japan, then all production was switched to Hong Kong, and this change is reflected in the tags. Weapons and other items were also typically stamped "Hasbro®", often with country of origin.

As with Action Man, during the 60s, G.I. Joe had a wooden footlocker to store his accessories in. The overall dimensions were identical to the Action Man item, but the details varied. The metal hinges and clasps were of different manufacture; the hinges did not have a built in stop to prevent the lid from falling back. The insert tray was of a yellow simulated grain plastic, instead of the white version of Action Man. There are green cords (age-bleached in example) attached to each end of the footlocker for carrying purposes. The lid had a G.I. Joe logo decal, and spaces to write one's name, rank and serial no. The lid had a decal insert that itemised all the Combat Soldier accessories it contained, matching the actual tray layout. In 1969, each figure had its own footlocker; Adventure locker, Astronaut locker, and Aquanaut locker with a new lid cover decal that illustrated two available outfit sets for each line. The insert trays for Aquanaut and Astronaut were different from the mold previously used, allowing for an outfit on the right. The Adventurer tray matched the earlier version. All three had different lid insert decals, as appropriate.

== Vehicle ==
Hasbro did not produce many vehicles for the early series G.I. Joe. The "Five Star" Jeep illustrated was one of the few offered, beginning in 1965. It was of sturdy construction, available with a trailer, in which the searchlight was mounted; an M40 105 mm recoilless rifle was mounted in the position occupied by the searchlight in the provided photographs. The Sears exclusive version of the jeep did not have the green rims, but was otherwise identical. There was also a sand colored variant sold as Desert Patrol. Hasbro also produced a Crash Crew Fire Truck. Hasbro granted a licence to Irwin in 1967 to manufacture seven vehicles; a small jet fighter, jet helicopter, motorcycle and side car (in a couple of color combinations), DUKW amphibious truck, armored car, personnel carrier with mine sweeper, and a German staff car. These were of the blow-mold variety, and suffered from lack of detail, disproportionate scaling, and longevity as a result of the cheaper production method.

In 1967, Hasbro sold but did not market two sets with vehicles under the Action Joe header. One was a police and motorcycle set, the other was a race car driver. Both were discontinued after poor market reception. The race car is similar in design to the more elaborate motorized version sold by Palitoy in the UK around the same time.

== 40th Anniversary reproductions ==
Starting in 2003, Hasbro began releasing large boxed sets that contained both a boxed figure and a large or small window-boxed related outfit set. Some sets came with a few carded accessories instead of a window box set. One soldier footlocker set was released; the large outer box has a diagonal stripe with "Timeless Collection" as did all 40th Anniversary sets. The 40th packaging was almost identical to the original items, with the addition of "Anniversary Edition" to all boxes, and "40th" imprinted on all plastic items to clearly distinguish them from original items. All literature and boxes contain the amended copyright "© 1964, 2003 Hasbro, Pawtucket, RI 02862 USA". These sets typically retailed for around $30 U.S. There were 23 general release sets all together: numbered 1-21, and 30. Others numbered between 22 and 29 have been released through collector clubs at premium prices (23 - Combat Soldier, and 25 - Pilot Dress Parade) since the general releases were cancelled. The figures were generally available in all Blonde, Black, Brown and Auburn hair variants, with the appropriate eye colors. A few sets came with American-ethnic variants. The body itself is simply the Timeless Collection, with a revised copyright, skin tone and head mold.

All 40th Anniversary sets came in a large green outer box. The figure box is on the left, with the actual figure visible from the back. There is little to remark on them since the contents of the package are identical in all aspects to original 60s variants, except as noted above. The overall attention to detailed replication of the original items and their specific layout in the packaging is of an excellent level, unlike the Timeless Collection items that often were slightly off in terms of scale and detailing. All sets came with the appropriate user manual (both figure and outfit/accessory), but none came with the equipment manual (fold-out leaflet) that depicted all available accessories for all four branches.

=== Figures ===
The figures enclosed with each set came in the 4 original hair colors; some sets contained American-ethnic figures, and the box illustrations matched accordingly. All figures included dog tags. All soldiers and marines came with tall brown boots; all pilots came with tall black boots, and all sailors came with short black boots. The clothing varies slightly from one set to another within each branch (as did original production 1964–1968). All reproduction clothing carries a modified neck tag to indicate China as country of origin, as opposed to Hong Kong or Japan of original issue. The following is a list of clothed figures contained in sets #1-20, and #30:

1. 1: Army; Green Fatigues, no pockets, green plastic cap.
2. 2: Sailor; Denim shirt/pants, no pockets, white vinyl hat.
3. 3: Marine; Camo fatigues, no pockets (stitched outline front pants pocket), green plastic cap.
4. 4: Pilot; Orange jumpsuit w/side tabs, blue plastic cap.
5. 5: Army; Green Fatigues, shirt pockets w/buttons, green plastic cap.
6. 6: Army; Green Fatigues, shirt pockets w/buttons, green plastic cap.
7. 7: Sailor; Denim shirt/pants with pockets, white cloth hat.
8. 8: Marine; Camo fatigues, w/pockets (no buttons), stitched outline front pants pocket, green plastic cap.
9. 9: Marine; Camo fatigues, no pockets (stitched outline front pants pocket), green plastic cap.
10. 10: Army; Green Fatigues, no pockets, green plastic cap.
11. 11: Marine; Camo fatigues, no pockets (stitched outline front pants pocket), green plastic cap.
12. 12:Pilot; Orange jumpsuit (no side tabs), blue plastic cap.
13. 13: Pilot; Orange jumpsuit (no side tabs), blue plastic cap.
14. 14: Army; Green Fatigues, stitched outline front and back pants pockets, green cloth cap.
15. 15: Sailor; Denim shirt/pants (no pockets), white cloth hat.
16. 16: Sailor; Denim shirt/pants (no pockets), white cloth hat.
17. 17: Marine; Camo fatigues, no pockets (stitched outline front pants pocket), green cloth cap.
18. 18: Army; Green Fatigues, Shirt pockets (w/buttons), stitched outline front and back pants pockets, green cloth cap.
19. 19: Pilot; "Goldenrod" jumpsuit w/sidetabs, blue plastic cap.
20. 20: Marine; Camo fatigues, shirt pockets w/buttons, stitched outline front pants pocket, green plastic cap.
21. 30: Army; Green Fatigues, no pockets, green plastic cap.

== See also ==
- Action Man

== Bibliography ==
- DeSimone, J (1994) "The New Official Identification Guide To G.I. Joe 1964–1978" (ISBN 0-9635956-1-X)
- United States Patent and Trademark Office
