= G.I. Joe: Classic Collection =

Hasbro action-figure-and-accessories toy set

- Type: Action figure
- Company: Hasbro
- Country: United States
- Availability: 1996–2004
- Official website

G.I. Joe: Classic Collection is an action-figure-and-accessories set produced by Hasbro US in a style initially influenced by the Hasbro G.I. Joe products of the 1960s. The set was first released in 1996.

== Introduction ==
With the renewed interest in 12-inch action figures of all kinds, Hasbro decided to go beyond the 12-inch versions of their "Hall of Fame" G.I. Joe line and reintroduce a series of figure closer in spirit to the original G.I. Joe lineup. Hasbro's G I Joe Classic Collection figures were first released in 1996, under the Kenner brand.

The following four figures were the initial Classic Collection offering: U.S. Army Infantry (desert camo), British SAS, Australian ODF and U.S. Airborne Ranger. Over the next few years, a wide range of figures was released, with overall attention to equipment and clothing detail. Minor changes were made to the actual figure during the "Classic Collection" run, until the broader G.I. Joe releases that used the same body, at which point variants with "fuzz heads", "kung fu" grip and greater articulation were introduced. This line re-introduced the attention to detail and range of equipment/uniforms that had made the original figure popular in the 1960s. Although sold as a toy, a prime target market was the then growing G.I. Joe collector's market. This line sparked a resurgence in 12-inch military action figures; a number of other companies began selling a wide range of military sets and vehicles, in most cases with more attention to detail than the Hasbro lineup, but not necessarily of a higher quality. In any event, this created a lot of competition for Hasbro's new G.I. Joe. Some figures were extremely close in detail and construction, such as those sold by 21st Century Toys; it carried its own trademarking, even though it was a blatant copy of Hasbro's product. Later, companies such as Dragon Models Limited produced figures with a far greater range of articulation & detail, at a premium price, but nonetheless very appealing to collectors.

== Bodies ==
Various ethnicities in addition to Native American and African American were implied through different skin tones and head sculpt variations. These figures offered a higher level of articulation than the Hall Of Fame (HOF) figures offered earlier in the 1990s, or the G.I. Joe store exclusives from 1996 (Airborne MP, Battle of the Bulge, Dress Marine, Navy SEAL w/raft, Navy Admiral, and others) that were based on the HOF body, with an adaptation of the original 1960s head sculpt and the weapons were more appropriately scaled to the figures. The bodies were also closer in spirit to the original G I Joe of the 1960s, articulated in a similar fashion, albeit of a much heavier plastic, with stiff joints which negatively impacted the poseability of the figures. The faces featured the trademark scar on the right cheek, and initially only one head mold was used, with the exception of the African American figure. All these early heads had a "flat-top" crewcut look. Later issues after the end of the deluxe windowbox format offered a variety of head molds, although the heads themselves were no longer as proportionate to the body, generally on the small side, including the flat-top version. The hands were also an improvement over the bulky HOF hand design, but still not to the level of the 1970s kung-fu grip, and were still somewhat oversized, with no separation of the fingers (although deft use of an xacto knife easily remedied this aspect). Later issue hands were smaller and more proportionate and some had fingers that pivoted on a pin running through the knuckles. The clothing and footwear was arguably of a more realistic nature than the earlier figures.

== Tags ==
All the outfits have a shirt tag similar to the vintage era, with "made in China" as opposed to the "made in Hong Kong" tag of yore. All figures came with two dog tags on a single chain; one with the G.I. Joe logo, the other indicating the represented branch/outfit the figure belonged to. This tag design was introduced with the G.I. Joe Hall of Fame series or figures.

== Packaging ==
The window-box packaging used for the first couple of years was intended to reflect the 1960s G I Joe packaging style, including the wood grain background and the excellent graphic representations of the enclosed soldier. Carded accessory sets were also offered, also reflecting the 1960s woodgrain packaging graphics. Special edition figures were also released through the Hasbro-authorized G I Joe Collectors Club, and through a number of retail stores, FAO Schwarz being the most exclusive (and expensive) offerings, such as the F15E Fighter Pilot, which retailed for US$135 at the time of release.

== Footlocker ==
The Classic Collection received its own footlocker; modelled after the 1975 G.I. Joe version, it was all plastic, with plastic clasp and hinges, but had cord carry handles, unlike the 1975 version. The overall dimensions were virtually identical to its older sibling, with "reinforced" corners, but with a hinge that ran the entire length. The tray insert was quite different, being of black plastic with a lift handle in the center.

== 1996 Classic Collection releases ==
This represents an example of the initial 1996 release, which included U.S. Army Infantry (desert camo), British SAS, Australian ODF and U.S. Airborne Ranger.

== FAO Schwarz Exclusive F15E Fighter Pilot ==
Only sold through FAO Schwarz stores, this was one of a number of exclusive (and expensive) offerings, clearly not priced for the average child.

== 1997 Classic Collection releases ==
That year saw the release of U.S. Army Tank Commander, U.S. Marine Corps Sniper, and French Foreign Legion figures, followed by the Modern Forces assortment.

== Classic Collection Tuskegee Airmen ==
Hasbro G.I. Joe added Action figures of the Tuskegee Airmen Fighter Pilot and Bomber Pilot, in recognition of the Black Veterans to their Classic Collection "WWII Forces" Limited Edition series in 1997. Tuskegee Airmen was the popular name of a group of African American pilots who flew with distinction for the United States Army Air Corps during World War II. The 12 inch figurines bearing trademark cheek scars were introduced in book cover window boxes with pilot's equipment and a history of the Tuskegee Airmen's presence in World War 2. The Bomber Soldier equipment included a Crusher Cap, Aviator Glasses, HS-18 Headphones, Shirt with Wings, Tie, Pants, A-2 Flight Jacket, 3/4 High G.I. Shoes, Personnel Belt, Pouch, 45.CAL Pistol, Holster, 4 Insulated Bottles, and A-1 Food Container. Fighter Pilot Joe comes with an A-11 flight helmet, a pair of B-7 goggles, A-14 oxygen mask, an officer's shirt with pilot's wings, trousers (Type A-9), a B-10 flight jacket, 3/4 G.I. boots, and Mae West life-vest, personnel belt, first aid pouch, and a pistol & holster, both pilots wear the classic Joe dog tags.

== Modern Forces Assortment ==
The subsequent 1997-on windowbox figures were sold under the Classic Collection Modern Forces Assortment.

These included U.S. Army Drill Sergeant, Belgian Para-Commando, U.S. Army Helicopter Pilot (G.I. Jane), U.S.M.C. Force Recon, U.S. Navy Blue Angel, U.S. 82nd Airborne (G.I. Jane), U.S. Army Coldweather, U.S. Navy Fuel Handler, and others.

== Additional Classic Collection ==
Other figures were also sold under this banner, still in the window box format, but under a variety of categories; included were "D-Day Salute", Shuttle Astronaut, Mercury Astronaut, PT-Boat Commander, B-17 Bomber Crewman, MOH Francis S. Currey and U.S. Army & Navy Footballers. The same body mold was used, with heads particular to the character portrayed.

== Classic Collection Historical Commanders ==
The line included historical figures such as Colin L. Powell, Omar N. Bradley, George Patton, Dwight Eisenhower and George Washington. Again, bodies were all the same mold, with head mold particular to the character portrayed.

== Later versions ==
Although the Classic Collection motif was dropped, the figure was still used in a wide variety of packaging formats, including Vehicle/Figure sets, Adventure Team sets, Foreign Soldier sets, and many economy priced basic figure sets before the 12' line was discontinued. Categories such as "Alpha, Bravo, Delta, Echo and Golf" were used to designate the various lines. Some of these featured a body with greater articulation, in response to the success of competition that offered better figures with articulation than Hasbro's offerings.

For the 35th anniversary of G.I. Joe, there was a combined Timeless/Classic Collection window-boxed set featuring a replica 1960s Joe, and a modern army soldier.

== Vehicles ==
There were a number of large boxed vehicles released after the first couple of years; Desert Light Strike Vehicle (with driver), Harley Davidson (with rider), Navy Gunner, and others. By this time, Hasbro faced stiff competition from other companies such as 21st Century Toys, Dragon, and others, that were producing high-quality scale vehicles for 12-inch action figures.

== Adventure Team sets ==
These were themed after the original 1970s releases, but came with adversarial figures of a meaningful size – unlike the pygmy gorilla, baby shark, etc., that accompanied the originals.

These figures had bearded fuzzheads, and either gripping hands, or a variant with pivoting fingers.
