= G.I. Joe: Timeless Collection =

Action figure set

- Type: Action Figures
- Invented by: Stanley Weston
- Company: Hasbro
- Country: United States
- Availability: 1998–2003
- Materials: Plastic
- Features: G.I. Joe

G.I. Joe: Timeless Collection is an action figure and accessories set reproducing Hasbro G.I. Joe product themes of the late 1960s- early 1970s. The set was produced from 1998 to 2003.

== Introduction ==
In the tail end of the 1990s Hasbro built on the renewed interest in authentic reproductions of G.I. Joe established by the Masterpiece Edition reproduction book/figure set; they bought the rights to the ME figure and released a range of store exclusive reproduction figure sets, with the character of the sixties G.I. Joe boxed sets. Later issues were themed after the Adventure Team sets, with flock hair and "kung fu" gripping hands, excluding the African-American figure. By the end of the run, the product line was somewhat confused, since the Adventure Team premise was also being offered with the new 90s body, in sets such as Secret of the Mummy's Tomb, Danger of the Depths and Search for the Yeti.

The first two sets of releases (Timeless Collection I and II) consisted of four offerings from FAO Schwarz, Toys "R" Us, KayBee Toys, and Target. The contents of the store exclusive sets was determined in part by the market the particular store served, so price-wise the spread was Target, Toys, KayBee then FAO on the high end. These releases brought together figure and a complete set of related accessories that were for the most part never offered in a single package in their original 1960s versions, but would have been offered as figure/carded accessories. Some sets were available with African-American figures. The fact that the main audience for these figure sets was adult males in their 30s–40s (with perhaps extra purchases for their own children) certainly has bearing on the pricing and packaging of these offerings.

== Packaging ==
=== Timeless Collection I ===
The packaging and included graphics were designed to evoke the style and feel of the original 60s releases. Timeless Collection I and II featured a lidded window box for the more expensive offerings, similar to the early Classic Collection. Timeless Collection I featured green boxes with a green marbled strip across the top and bottom of the boxes. This style of packaging design was first used with the Classic Collection FAO Schwarz F15E pilot, several years earlier. Target Stores offered a US infantry soldier and footlocker; the packaging says "footlocker series", but only one version was ever released. Toys 'R' Us offered Mission: Splashdown, which was one of the two physically largest store release packages. FAO Schwarz had an elaborate wooden box set for their exclusive Green Beret. Kay-Bee Toys offered Heavy Weapons, which came with die-cast metal accessories. Walmart's offerings, "General Ulysses S. Grant" and limited edition "General Robert E. Lee" was labeled "Civil War Series". It is also a bit of an anomaly, since no such figure ever existed in the original 60s lineup.

=== Timeless Collection II ===
Timeless Collection II maintained the same format, but switched to a brown coloration. Toys 'R' Us offered the "Rescue of the Lost Squadron" which was the other of the two physically largest store release packages. FAO Schwarz continued the elaborate wooden box format for their exclusive Marine Jungle Fighter. Kay-Bee Toys offered the Deep Sea Diver, again with all metal accessories & equipment. Target released a lower priced Action Sailor, in either Caucasian or African American. Neither the Toys nor Target packages had the signature marbled lidded cover.

=== Timeless Collection III ===
Timeless Collection III included Target's "Scramble Pilot" and Kaybee's "Talking Action Pilot", with the Talker pilot in the lidded box format, which included a graphic representation of the original figure box on the cover. Unfortunately, the parachute included with the talker pilot was just for show, it was not functional as was the original 60s version. J.C. Penney offered the "Forward Observer Set".

=== Timeless Collection continue ===
Subsequent releases were simply labeled "Timeless Collection - Reminiscent of the Golden Age of G.I. Joe" in a window box format utilizing a nice heavy card construction, with graphics and details from the original 60s releases. All sets were store exclusives, and J.C. Penney was added to the roster. These sets included "Talking Action Sailor", "Green Beret machine Gun Outpost", and "Australian Jungle Fighter" which had the "Foreign Head" as with the original 60s release, and "Airborne Military Police". In many sets, all the accessories were die-cast metal instead of plastic, if somewhat impractical if one wished to pose the figures holding them. Not to be outdone, the FAO Schwarz offerings contained two figures in each set (and for a more reasonable price of $89.99, than their usual $125+ range): the "West Point & Annapolis Cadets" and the "Air Force Academy Cadet & American Cadet Alliance Marine". Then the late sixties "Adventures of G.I. Joe" series that preceded the advent of the Adventure Team was featured with sets such as "Perilous Rescue", "Secret Mission to Spy Island", amongst others. The latter issues were "adventure team" based sets such as "Black Spider Rendezvous", "Undercover Agent", "Skydive to Danger", and "Eight Ropes of Danger", and featured a fuzz-head, kung fu grip version of the TC figure. Some of the last releases such as Skydive contained a fuzz head, kung fu grip 40th Anniversary body (darker skin tone, head closer to original painted-head) instead of the TC version, and the packaging was of the lighter weight card, closer in design to that used for the Classic Collection-based Adventure Team figures, such as Search For The Yeti.

== Figures ==
The figure was based on the ME (Masterpiece Edition) doll, with a change of skin tone and facial coloring, which in turn was a reproduction of the doll Hasbro had patented during the 1960s; patent #3,277,602, invented by Sam Speers. The original patent drawings can be viewed by searching the US Patent and Trademark office (a link is provided under references) free of charge. The skin tone was more tan, and lacked the unfortunate pinkish shine of the ME release. The features were painted with colors not used previously, such as green eyes in some cases. All original hair colors were used; Auburn (red), Black, Brown, and Blonde. The knee pivot was updated, to prevent the calf from over-extending in a forward position, and the plastic used was less susceptible to stress cracks that plagued the ME releases. The hands are also less brittle, so the fingers do not snap when weapons are pressed between for posing. As with the ME release, the various limb sections are of slightly different size and markings, to clearly distinguish them from original 60s bodies, for copyright reasons. A talker Pilot and Sailor were part of the lineup, with pull string activation of a battery operated voice box, unlike the original spring/record tape mechanism. The trademarking on the buttock includes "authentic reproduction made in China" imprinted on the left cheek.

== Early (1998–1999) box cover and inset ==
These examples indicate the uniformity of design, with the specific store name listed at the bottom of the cover.

== Special editions ==
The idea of reviving the store exclusive special editions of the 60s was not a bad marketing ploy, but the reality was that the exclusivity of the special releases made for frustration on the part of many collectors, since not all chains exist across the country, and within a chain, not all locations would stock the releases; this made it an ideal opportunity for individuals to sell exclusives through online auctions at vastly inflated prices (when the retail price was already on the steep side, all things considered). The FAO offerings were at least readily available through their online store, so one could purchase them no matter where in the U.S. one lived.

== Talking editions ==
The two talking editions of the series were talking pilot and talking sailor, with pull-string activated electronic voice boxes. Target sold the lower priced sailor, while Kaybee sold the pilot.

== Subsequent releases ==
Hasbro continued to produce a variety of exclusive offerings that utilize this figure; most were not available to the general public, and some sets were priced in the hundreds of dollars. A couple of the more basic offerings were a talking Land Adventurer, and basic Land adventurer (2006 Hot Topic store exclusive, $14.99 U.S.), both with reproduction boxes/literature. A talking AT commander was released (same as Talking Pilot and Talking Sailor), with the flocked hair and beard. The mechanism is pull cord activated, but battery operated unlike the original 1960s-1970s version.

== See also ==
- G.I. Joe
- Action Man

== Bibliography ==
- DePriest, D. (1999) The Collectable G.I. Joe (ISBN 0-7624-0536-8)
- Michlig, J. (1998) G.I. Joe; The Complete Story of America's Favorite Man of Action (ISBN 0-8118-1822-5)
