= G.I. Joe =

American line of action figures and media franchise

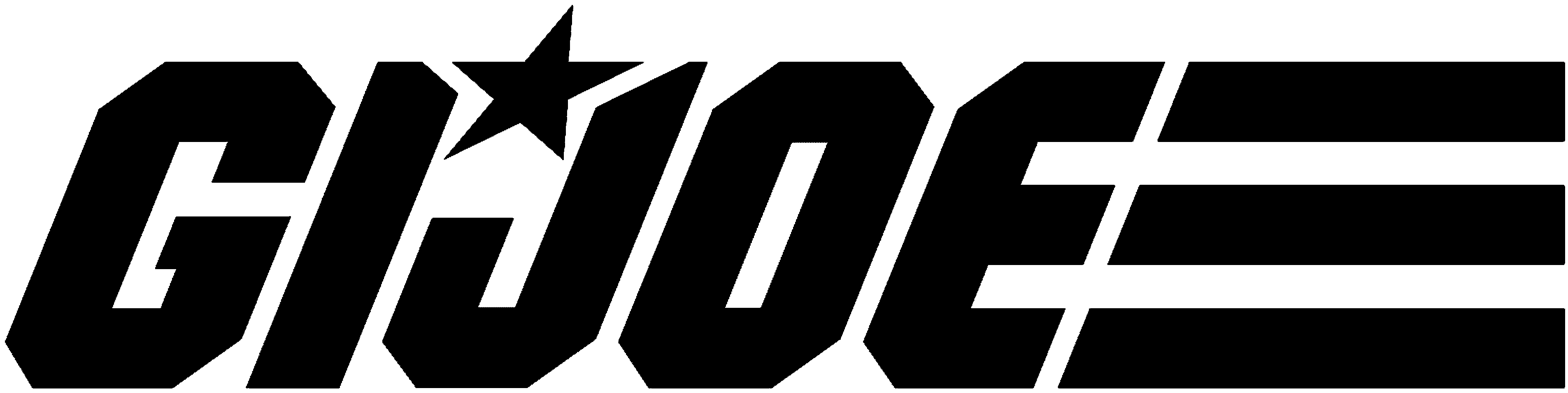
- Created by: Stanley Weston; Donald Levine
- Original work: America's Movable Fighting Man (1964)
- Owner: Hasbro
- Years: 1964–present

Print publications
- Comics: G.I. Joe

Films and television
- Films: Animated; G.I. Joe: The Movie; Spy Troops; Valor vs. Venom; Ninja Battles; Live action; The Rise of Cobra; Retaliation; Snake Eyes
- Animated series: 1983 series; 1989 series; Extreme; Sigma 6; Resolute; Renegades

Games
- Video games: List of video games

Audio
- Soundtracks: G.I. Joe: The Rise of Cobra; G.I. Joe: Retaliation

Miscellaneous
- Toys: List of toy series
- Related franchises: Transformers; Action Force

Official website
- https://shop.hasbro.com/en-us/all-products?brand=gi-joe

G.I. Joe is an American media franchise and a line of action figures owned and produced by the toy company Hasbro. The initial product offering represented four of the branches of the U.S. armed forces with the Action Soldier (U.S. Army), Action Sailor (U.S. Navy), Action Pilot (U.S. Air Force), Action Marine (U.S. Marine Corps), Action lifeline (U.S. Coast Guard) and later on, the Action Nurse. "G.I. Joe" is a nickname for a U.S. soldier, itself derived from the more general term "G.I.". The development of G.I. Joe led to the coining of the term "action figure". G.I. Joe's appeal to children has made it an American icon among toys.

The G.I. Joe trademark has been used by Hasbro for several different toy lines, although only two have been successful. The original 12-inch (30 cm) line introduced on February 1, 1964, centered on realistic action figures. In the United Kingdom, this line was licensed to Palitoy and known as Action Force. In 1982 the line was relaunched in a 3.75-inch (9.5 cm) scale complete with vehicles, playsets, and a complex background story involving an ongoing struggle between the G.I. Joe Team and the evil Cobra organization which seeks to take over the Free World through terrorism. As the American line evolved into the Real American Hero series, Action Man also changed, by using the same molds and being renamed as Action Force. Although the members of the G.I. Joe team are not superheroes, they all had expertise in areas such as martial arts, weapons, and explosives.

G.I. Joe was inducted into the National Toy Hall of Fame at The Strong in Rochester, New York, in 2004 and into the Pop Culture Hall of Fame in 2017.

Each year, G.I. Joe Day is celebrated on February 1 to mark the start of the brand. The line made its first public appearance at the New York Toy Fair on February 9, 1964, one week after being launched.

== History of the 12-inch (30 cm) figures ==
=== Stan Weston's original design (1963) ===
Original G.I. Joe lineup

The original idea for the action figure that would become G.I. Joe was developed in 1963 by Stanley Weston, a Manhattan licensing agent. Weston made rudimentary prototypes of the figure and basic marketing materials that showed the sales potential of a military action figure.

When he showed these materials to Donald Levine, a Hasbro executive, Levine told Weston: "You will make a fortune with these". Weston subsequently licensed the entire concept to Hasbro for US$100,000.

=== America's movable fighting man (1964–1969) ===
The conventional marketing wisdom of the early 1960s was that boys would not play with dolls and parents would not buy their sons dolls, which have been traditionally a girl's toy; thus the word "doll" was never used by Hasbro or anyone involved in the development or marketing of G.I. Joe. "Action figure" was the only acceptable term, and has since become the generic description for any poseable figure intended for boys. G.I. Joe was specifically designed using the articulation of an artist's model, even going so far as being used to produce the prototype toys. "America's movable fighting man" is a registered trademark of Hasbro, and was prominently displayed on every boxed figure package.

The Hasbro prototypes were originally named "Rocky", "Skip", and "Ace", before the more universal name G.I. Joe was adopted. One of the prototypes would later sell in a Heritage auction in 2003 for $200,001. An African-American figure was introduced in 1965, though it was simply the same face as the white figure, but molded in brown plastic.

Aside from the obvious trademarking on the right buttock, other aspects of the figure were copyrighted features that allowed Hasbro to successfully pursue cases against producers of cheap imitations, since the human figure itself cannot be copyrighted or trademarked. The scar on the right cheek was one; another, unintentional at first, was the placement of the right thumbnail on the underside of the thumb. Early trademarking, with "G.I. Joe™", was used through some point in 1965; the markings changed once G.I. Joe was a registered trademark; "G.I. Joe®" now appears on the first line. Subsequently, the stamped trademarking was altered after the patent was granted (in late 1966), and assigned a number; 3,277,602. Figures with this marking would have entered the retail market during 1967.

=== Adventure Team (1970–1976) ===
By the late 1960s, in the wake of the Vietnam War, Hasbro sought to downplay the war theme that had initially defined "G.I. Joe". The line became known as "The Adventures of G.I. Joe". In 1970, Hasbro settled on the name "Adventure Team". Highlights of the line included:

- To coincide with the new direction, "Life-Like" flocked hair and beard, an innovation developed in England by Palitoy for their licensed version of Joe, Action Man, is introduced in 1970. A retooled African American Adventurer was also introduced, which came in two versions as did the others in the series, bearded or shaven.
- In 1974, named after the increasingly popular martial art, Hasbro introduced "Kung-Fu Grip" to the G.I. Joe line. This was another innovation that had been developed in the UK for Action Man. The hands were molded in a softer plastic that allowed the fingers to grip objects in a more lifelike fashion. The polymer used, however, broke down quickly, which caused the end of the thumb and fingertips to break off after a few weeks.
- In 1976, G.I. Joe was given eagle eye vision; a movable eye mechanism to allow the toy to appear to be looking around when a lever in the back of the head was moved. This would be the last major innovation for the original line of 12-inch (30 cm) figures.

==== A shift in play patterns ====
Mike Power, Atomic Man

For its first ten years, G.I. Joe was a generic soldier/adventurer with only the slightest hints of a team concept existing. In 1975, after a failed bid to purchase the toy rights to the Six Million Dollar Man, Hasbro issued a bionic warrior figure: Mike Power, Atomic Man. One million units were sold. Also added to the Adventure Team was a superhero, Bulletman. This character had recurring enemies, The Intruders – Strongmen from Another World. Comics included with figures at the time featured "Eagle Eye" Joe, Atomic Man, and Bullet Man operating together; the Adventure Team was finally an actual team. The original 12-inch (30 cm) G.I. Joe line ended in America in 1976. At this time, Hasbro released a line of inexpensive, rotationally molded mannequins in the G.I. Joe style called The Defenders. Hasbro published comic book advertisements starring the Adventure Team, featuring the original G.I. Joe, Atomic Man, and Bulletman as members.

=== International G.I. Joe licensees ===
From 1966 through 1984, Palitoy Ltd. produced a British version of the 12-inch (30 cm) G.I. Joe line, under the Action Man name for the UK market. Initially, these were exactly the same designs as the American figures, and at first the same military theme which included figures from World War II. The line later expanded to include all men of action, like football players and other sports figures. In the early 1980s, Palitoy responded to falling sales of Action Man by launching "Action Force", a new range of smaller military-themed figures in the style of the then-popular Star Wars line from Kenner. Later, when the U.S. Real American Hero line was released in the UK, they were released under the 'Action Force' title, since the term "G.I." is not in common use in Britain. The figures had the same appearance and code names as the American G.I. Joes, but their identities and histories were international rather than purely American or British. The range was later renamed G.I. Joe to bring it into line with international markets; however, the Action Man line retained its original name when it was revived in the early 1990s.

The G.I. Joe line was also licensed to Germany under the Action Team name. In Spain, Geyperman was the Hasbro licensee, although the products were more based on Palitoy's line, down to the logo design. In France the name was Action Joe, in Japan, Takara and Tsukuda licensed the figures under the names "G.I. Joe" and "Combat Man". In Italy, Polistil licensed the figures under the Action Team name. In Australia, the line was released as "G.I. Joe" by Kenbrite; Palitoy also licensed their "ActionMan" line to TolToys. In Brazil, it was licensed to Brinquedos Estrela; the 12-inch (30 cm) line was called "Falcon" and the 3.75-inch (9.5 cm) figures were called "Comandos em Ação" ("Commandos in Action"). In Argentina, the G.I. Joe figures were licensed by Veri-li enterprises under the name "Joe Super Temerario", and "Los Temerarios". The G.I. Joe toy line was produced in India under the Funskool brand. In Mexico, G.I. Joe was licensed to Lili-Ledy and were named "Hombres de Acción" (Men of Action).

=== Hall of Fame (1991–1994) ===
Hasbro began releasing new 12-inch (30 cm) G.I. Joe figures in 1991. The first figure, Duke, was marketed exclusively to Target retail stores.

Based on the Real American Hero toyline, the Hall of Fame series featured Mission Gear Outfits, vehicles, and featured popular characters like Snake-Eyes, Stalker, Gung-Ho, Cobra Commander, Destro, and Storm Shadow among others.

This was followed by an anniversary series based on the 1960s line and was followed by the Hall of Fame Limited Editions, also based on 60s releases.

=== Classic Collection (1995–2004) ===
G.I. Janes were introduced in a series called the Classic Collection, the first 12-inch (30 cm) female dolls in the G.I. Joe line-up since 1967; this doll was a helicopter pilot. The Classic Collection hearkened back to the original all military theme of G.I. Joe with fairly realistic uniforms and gear. Soldiers from Australia, Britain, and other nations, as well as United States forces were featured. The line also presented an all-new articulated G.I. Joe figure that formed the basis of many offerings until the 12-inch (30 cm) line was discontinued in the new millennium.

In 2000, a Navajo Code Talker was introduced, one of only two 12-inch (30 cm) G.I. Joe talking figures (until this time) since the 1970s.the other being the WW2 Military Police figure.

In 2001, G.I. Joe honored the events of the 1941 attack on Pearl Harbor by releasing a line of Pearl Harbor figures. In 2003 Hasbro announced the release of the 40th Anniversary G.I. Joe line. This line featured reproductions of the earliest G.I. Joe figures and accessories originally made in 1964.

=== Masterpiece (1996–1997) ===
In 1997, the original G.I. Joe figure returned via the G.I. Joe Masterpiece Edition, a unique book-and-figure product created by Chronicle Books with assistance from Don Levine, former creative director of Hasbro Toys and the driving force behind the original Joe concept.

=== Timeless Collection (1998–2003) ===
During the late 1990s Hasbro built on the renewed interest in authentic reproductions of G.I. Joe established by the Masterpiece Edition reproduction book/figure set; they bought the rights to the ME figure and released a range of store exclusive reproduction figure sets, with the character of the sixties G.I. Joe boxed sets.

=== GI Joe 40th Anniversary (2003–) ===
Reproduction boxed uniform and figure sets were released, covering the original product lineup of 1964 – Action Soldier, Action Sailor, Action Marine and Action Pilot. The supplied figure was a variation on the previously released Masterpiece Edition reproduction figure (as indicated on the left & right buttock), with a revised head sculpt.

In November 2006 a reproduction Land Adventurer G.I. Joe figure was released as an exclusive to Hot Topic stores. The figure was a reproduction of the Land Adventurer with the Kung-Fu Grip hands and came in the "Coffin" style box. A reproduction Talking Adventure Team Commander was also released in a limited run of 1,970 issues.

Adventure Team boxed figures were subsequently released exclusively via Walmart. The available figures were the Land, Sea, Air Adventurers, Man of Action and the African American Adventurer. All figures except the African American used the (flocked) head sculpt of the 40th Anniversary series release.

== History of the 3.75-inch (9.5 cm) figures ==
=== A Real American Hero (1982–1994) ===
The year 1982 saw the highly successful relaunch of the G.I. Joe product line in a smaller, 3.75-inch (9.5 cm) scale. The scale was the same scale used by the Kenner's Star Wars figures, but with many more points of articulation much like the 1970s Mego's Micronauts toy line which itself was licensed directly from Takara's Microman toy line.

This relaunch pioneered several tactics in toy marketing, combining traditional advertising with an animated television mini-series and an ongoing comic book. The decision to use a smaller 3.75-inch (9.5 cm) scale for the figures also made it possible for Hasbro to produce a variety of matching vehicles and playsets that further expanded the appeal and commercial potential of the line.

G.I. Joe's increasing popularity supported an array of spin-off merchandising that included posters, t-shirts, video games, board games, and kites. In 1985, both Toy & Lamp and Hobby World magazines ranked G.I. Joe as the top-selling American toy.

The 3.75-inch (9.5 cm) line was canceled at the end of 1994. This was also the 30th anniversary of G.I. Joe and accordingly, Hasbro released a series of 12-inch (30 cm) and 3.75-inch (9.5 cm) figures based on the Original Action Team figures from 1964.

=== Stars & Stripes Forever – TRU Exclusives (1997–1998) ===
A select assortment of figures from the "Real American Hero" line were released as Toys "R" Us exclusives to celebrate the 15th anniversary. A second assortment followed in 1998.

=== A Real American Hero Collection (2000–2002) ===
In 2000, Hasbro re-released a selection of 3.75-inch (9.5 cm) G.I. Joe figures and vehicles. This line lasted until 2002. The figures were sold in packs of two and consisted of repainted versions of figures from the Real American Hero line. Some of these repainted figures were assigned new identities: for example, the Baroness figure was repainted and sold as a new character called Chameleon, described on the packaging as "the illegitimate half sister of Baroness".

=== G.I. Joe vs Cobra (2002–2005) ===
Beginning in 2002, newly designed collections of 3.75-inch (9.5 cm) G.I. Joe figures and vehicles were released. Each collection centered on a storyline or theme, such as "Spy Troops" and "Valor vs. Venom".

Direct-to-DVD features were animated for both the G.I. Joe: Spy Troops and G.I. Joe: Valor vs. Venom collections, as well as a new trading card game based on the G.I. Joe vs. Cobra storyline. Both the 12-inch (30 cm) and 3.75-inch (9.5 cm) lines were put on hiatus prior to the release of the Sigma 6 line in 2005.

=== Direct to Consumer (DTC) (2005–2006) ===
The 3.75-inch (9.5 cm) line was reintroduced after a very brief hiatus via Hasbro's direct-to-consumer website HasbroToyShop.com and various online retailers. As a result of the line's success, some figures also became available at certain retailers, such as Toys "R" Us.

=== 25th Anniversary (2007–2009) ===
To commemorate the 25th anniversary of the Real American Hero line in 2007, Hasbro released a collection of newly sculpted 4-inch (10 cm) figures (as opposed to the 3.75-inch (9.5 cm) scale of the RAH line) based on classic and new designs of many of the line's best known and most popular characters. The 25th-anniversary figures replaced the classic O-ring construction with a swivel chest feature and increased points of articulation beyond the standard shoulder, elbow and knees to swivel wrists, ankles and double-hinged knees. The 25th-anniversary figures also include "Specialist Trakker", otherwise known as Matt Trakker the leader of M.A.S.K.

Originally planned to consist of only two sets of five figures each (one G.I. Joe and one Cobra), the "25th Anniversary" collection was well received by retailers and collectors and was expanded by Hasbro into a full-fledged toyline that ran through 2009. The most recent releases in this line do not include the "25th Anniversary" branding, but in all other respects constitute a continuation of the "25th Anniversary" collection. Other waves released in 2009 include the Resolute figures, which were introduced in wave 13, and had an animated feature premiere in April 2009.

The "25th Anniversary" line was later canceled, in favor of releasing figures for the upcoming live-action movie. Some of the planned figures from canceled waves, totaling 14 figures, were instead released as two 7-figure exclusive packs. Entitled "Defense of Cobra Island" and Attack on Cobra Island, each set contained figures from one opposing side. The canceled future waves included Night Force Falcon, the Python Patrol Trooper and Tele-Viper, and an Iron Klaw/Resolute Crimson Guard Trooper Comic Pack.

=== The Rise of Cobra (2009) ===
In July 2009, a series of figures based on the G.I. Joe: The Rise of Cobra movie was released in the United States and Australia. The line was a mixture of The Rise of Cobra movie designs, some G.I. Joe vs Cobra designs, some 25th anniversary figure molds and new molds.

=== The Pursuit of Cobra (2010–2011) ===
In 2010, a new series of figures was released, based on four battlegrounds: Desert, City, Jungle and Arctic. The packaging was an update to the 25th anniversary design.

=== 30th Anniversary (2011–2012) ===
In 2011, a new series of figures was released, including characters from both G.I. Joe: A Real American Hero and the G.I. Joe: Renegades cartoon series. This series was continued through 2012.

=== Retaliation (2013) ===
A series of figures based on the movie G.I. Joe: Retaliation was confirmed by Hasbro in February 2012. Despite the movie's release being moved from June 2012 to March 2013, the initial assortments of figures, vehicles, and role-play items were shipped to retailers, and appeared on store shelves in May 2012. A Variety article was published stating that the already released figures had been pulled from the shelves and recalled by Hasbro, although the companies official statement indicated that existing product would be sold through. New product shipments were halted by Hasbro, but existing Retaliation figures were available in Target, Wal-Mart, and Toys R Us as late as December 2012. The toyline was re-released in the United States in February 2013.

=== 50th Anniversary (2014–2016) ===
In 2014, to celebrate the 50th anniversary of G.I. Joe, a new line of figures was released, using characters from the G.I. Joe: A Real American Hero cartoon series. This series ended in 2016.

=== Retro Collection (2020-2022) ===
In 2020, Hasbro released a new line of super-articulated figures and vehicles, similar to the Star Wars The Vintage Collection, utilizing retro-themed packaging from the 1980s. Low sales, unpopular design choices, and quality control issues led this line to end prematurely.

== Other toylines ==
=== Super Joe (1977–1978) ===
In 1977, Hasbro released the Super Joe Adventure Team, and took the battle between good and evil to the stars. The figures were scaled down to 8 1/2 inches, similar in size to Mego's Superheroes line of action figures. The line was a hybrid of superhero and space action figures with new features incorporated such as battery powered back-pack lights and motorized accessories. The hero Super Joe characters, Super Joe Commander (Caucasian/African American) and Super Joe (Caucasian/African American) had a "One-Two Punch" that could be activated by pressing panels on the figure's back. The majority of these figures used Kung-Fu grip style plastic in the joints and hands. But with age, the material degrades, leaving even unopened figures missing limbs and hands.

Unlike the original G.I. Joe collection, the Super Joe collection was developed from the start with a play-pattern of Good vs Evil. Super Joe Commander and the Adventure Team (Man of Action, and Adventurer) with their alien comrades "The Night Fighters", Luminos and The Shield, fight against the evil Gor, King of the Terrons, Terron, The Beast from Beyond, and his orange-eyed ally Darkon, the half-man half-monster (the action figure was the same as the Super Joe Commander, but molded in dark green plastic and with a different set of accessories.)

As with the previous series, various accessory/costume packs were sold for the Super Joe line (including several that were powered by the Commander's light vest via a jack to the battery pack.) Most of the non-powered packs were updated versions of previous GI Joe packs – some of which simply used the same accessories without scaling them down for the smaller figure. (The Sears exclusive "Avenger Pursuit Craft" was the same as a prior GI Joe vehicle, molded in a different color and with different decals.)

Super Joe was discontinued by the end of 1978. The same basic body molds were used later by a subsidiary of Hasbro to produce a line of action figures based on the TV series Space Academy.

=== Short-lived lines (1994–1997) ===
As a follow-up to the Real American Hero toyline, Sgt. Savage and his Screaming Eagles figures debuted in late 1994. It was canceled after only two waves of figures were released, due to a combination of scarce marketing and, therefore, low sales.

In 1995, G.I. Joe Extreme figures were introduced by Kenner Toys (who had merged with Hasbro in late 1994, taking over their boys toys production). Along with the release of toys, G.I. Joe Extreme featured a comic book, published by Dark Horse Comics, and a Gunther-Wahl-produced cartoon series which ran for two seasons.

=== Sigma 6 (2005–2007) ===
2005 saw the introduction of a new line called G.I. Joe: Sigma 6, consisting initially of an 8" scale selection of action figures distinguished by their extensive articulation and accessories. Sigma 6 combined entirely new characters with already familiar characters from the 3.75-inch (9.5 cm) "Real American Hero" line. Its release was accompanied by a television series produced by the Japanese animation studio GONZO, and a comic book mini-series published by Devil's Due. Hasbro also expanded the Sigma 6 line to include a 2 1/2" scale selection of vehicles, play sets, and figurines with limited articulation.

2007 saw the re-branding of the 8" line. The Sigma Six branding was dropped in the spring of 2007. Subsequent 8" figures were branded simply as "G.I. Joe" action figures and divided into differently packaged sub-groups such as Combat Squad, Commandos, and Adventure Team. The entire 8" product line was canceled by the end of 2007, although Hasbro considers the 8" figures a success and may revisit the scale in the future.

=== Sideshow Collectibles (2009–present) ===
In 2009, Sideshow Collectibles began releasing its own line of G.I. Joe figures under license from Hasbro. These highly detailed figures offer new looks at key characters. In addition, Sideshow also created "Figure Environments", which are small diorama pieces intended to enhance the display of their figures. A line of figures was featured at Comic-Con 2012.

=== Real people honored with G.I. Joe figures ===
The G.I. Joe brand has made promotional action figures based on real-life persons, both military and civilian, that the company deems Real American Heroes.

=== G.I. Joe Classified Series (2020–present) ===
In the second quarter of 2020, Hasbro announced the new release of the G.I. Joe Classified Series. It was announced as a new line of highly articulated 6-inch scale action figures that included prominent characters like Snake Eyes, Scarlett, Roadblock, Duke, and Destro in the first wave. A deluxe edition Snake Eyes (version 00) was released before Wave 1 as an exclusive from Hasbro Pulse. Cobra Commander, Gung Ho, and Red Ninja were included in the second wave. Many repaint releases of the previous figures and also the characters from the 2021 film Snake Eyes were included in this series. There have been more than 50 figures of the famous G.I. Joe characters as of 2022 with news of even more characters to be released in the future, including the return of Sgt. Slaughter to the series, and the announcement of his sub-team, the Marauders returning in 2023.

There have been a few vehicles released as part of deluxe figures, including a Cobra motorcycle, the C.O.I.L., the G.I. Joe R.A.M., and a repaint of the G. I. Joe R.A.M. in the Tiger Force line.

In July 2022, fans successfully funded the first HasLab vehicle for this line, a H.I.S.S. tank with 4 exclusive figures and accessories. A tiered method of crowdfunding was used to provide the total number of figures. A second HasLab vehicle, a Dragonfly attack chopper that came included with 4 additional figures, was also successfully funded in the following year in July 2023. This series has some exclusive lines that are dedicated to certain retailers, including Special Missions: Cobra Island, Tiger Force, and Python Patrol. There are also special figures that are limited to certain retailers like Amazon. There is also a line of Retro Cardback figures that were formerly exclusive to Walmart but are now general releases. Some figures are only available directly from Hasbro, including several like the Snake Supreme Cobra Commander, Master of Disguise Zartan, and a future figure of Serpentor as part of their yearly online exclusive convention, Pulsecon.

=== Super7 (2021–present) ===
In 2021, the toy company Super7 started producing two lines of G.I. Joe figures. One is part of their ReAction line of 3.75" figures, with figures inspired from classic episodes of the Animated Series. They have also started releasing figures in their Ultimate's 7 inch line, that include multiple head designs, hands, and accessories.

== In media ==
=== Comics ===
G.I. Joe originated from a comic strip in the 1940s called "Private Breger". As a licensed property by Hasbro, G.I. Joe comics have been released from 1967 to present. G.I. Joe re-appeared in the 1980s as a promotional comic book, produced by Marvel Comics. The success of the main title led Marvel Comics to produce a secondary title, G.I. Joe: Special Missions which lasted 28 issues. The main series released its final issue #155 in December 1994, coinciding with the end of the Real American Hero toy line.

In July 2001, Devil's Due Publishing acquired the rights to G.I. Joe and released a four-issue limited series entitled G.I. Joe: A Real American Hero (Reinstated). The new series picked up seven years after the end of the Marvel Comics series, and also used elements from the animated TV series. Strong sales led to Reinstated being upgraded to ongoing, and DDP also published other G.I. Joe titles outside the existing continuity. DDP's license with Hasbro expired in 2008 and was not renewed.

In 2009, IDW Publishing began to publish the series again. IDW's G.I. Joe series is a complete reboot of the property, ignoring the continuity from the Marvel and Devil's Due incarnations of the comic, and eventually was folded into a shared Hasbro Comic Book Universe with other Hasbro-based titles published by the company such as Transformers. However, the G.I. Joe: A Real American Hero series originally published by Marvel Comics in the 1980s and 1990s was revived as an ongoing series in May 2010 with a special #155 1/2 issue, and followed by #156 onwards in July 2010. The series directly picks up from the end of the Marvel Comics series and ignores the Devil's Due continuity completely. In 2022 it was announced that IDW lost the rights to G.I Joe.

In 2023, Skybound Entertainment announced they had acquired the rights to G.I. Joe, and would be launching a new shared universe, the Energon Universe, that would include G.I. Joe, Transformers, and a new original property, Void Rivals; the first G.I. Joe comic as part of this universe was launched December 2023. It was also announced that they would resume publishing A Real American Hero, with issue #301 in November 2023 picking up where the IDW revival had left off.

=== Records and Read-Along Sets ===
In 1966, Hanna-Barbera Records was the first label to produce a G.I. Joe album, titled "The Story of the Green Beret." In the 1970s, four Book and Record 45 rpm sets were released by Peter Pan Records, which tied into accessory packages. Three of these were combined into an LP. The art of the original Peter Pan book and record sets was created by Carl Pfeufer. The same recordings were also repackaged as material for G.I. Joe: A Real American Hero.

=== Television ===
Marvel Productions and Sunbow Productions released G.I. Joe: A Real American Hero in 1983 to promote the 3.75 inch (9.5 cm) toyline. The premise was "good vs. evil" as explained in the show's opening theme song, provided by Jackson Beck (previously known for his work as Popeye's nemesis Bluto): "'G.I. Joe' is the code name for America's daring, highly trained special mission force. Its purpose: to defend human freedom against Cobra, a ruthless terrorist organization determined to rule the world".

The show featured physical fighting and high-tech weapons as a way to compensate for toned-down violence and lack of bullets in what was intended to be a children's program. The show also featured public service announcements placed at the end of each episode. These PSAs ended with the phrase: "Now I know!" or "And knowing is half the battle". The series ran for a total of 95 episodes, from 1983 to 1986.

The animated series was canceled after the release of G.I. Joe: The Movie, but made a significant return with the animation company DiC taking over where Sunbow/Marvel left off, and ran from 1989 to 1991. DiC released a 5-part mini-series entitled "Operation: Dragonfire", in which the Joes faced off once again against Cobra as they tried to take control of an energy source known only as 'dragonfire'. In this mini-series, Cobra Commander was also returned to a semi-human state by the energy itself while Serpentor, the Cobra emperor, was turned into an iguana by the dragonfire. This mini-series was successful enough for DiC to produce 2 more seasons.

In 1995, Sunbow returned to produce G.I. Joe Extreme, an animated series based upon the namesake toy line. This series, along with the toy line, was canceled after 2 seasons, broadcast from 1995 to 1997.

In the 2000s, a new interest in the "Real American Hero" toy line brought about new lines, including Spy Troops (2003), Valor vs. Venom (2004), and Sigma 6 (2005–2007). In 2009, G.I. Joe: Resolute was launched. This new series was more realistic and contained graphic violence and dark themes, with Cobra portrayed as a serious threat, a sharp contrast to the relatively lighter-toned animated series that preceded it. Resolute was originally released as mini webisodes, with the full series later broadcast on Cartoon Network's Adult Swim.

In 2010, The Hub launched G.I. Joe: Renegades, in which the Joes became fugitives seeking to clear their names while Cobra worked towards world domination under the guise of a pharmaceutical company. The series' last episode aired 2011.

It has also been spoofed by the cult animated sci-fi series Futurama in the episode "Saturday Morning Fun Pit".

In 2014, the American sitcom Community featured an episode ("G.I. Jeff") where one of the main characters dreams that he and his friends are characters in the 1983 cartoon series. The episode was animated in the same style and featured some of the same voice actors as the cartoon. The episode also features scenes where the character's mind is trying to get back to reality, but keeps getting caught in G.I. Joe commercials.

In 2021, Paramount TV Studios, eOne, Skydance and Amazon Prime Video are developing the first live action G.I. Joe TV series that will focus on Lady Jaye with Erik Oleson serving as the creator and showrunner.

=== Film ===
Many movies have been made based upon G.I. Joe and the toy lines that developed from the action figure. The G.I. Joe: Real American Hero animated series was followed up by G.I. Joe: The Movie. The film had been released direct-to-video in 1987 because of the perceived box office failure of another animated movie – The Transformers: The Movie. Inspired by viewers' reaction to Optimus Prime's death, G.I. Joe: The Movie was edited, cutting out the death of one of the main characters, Duke. Instead, he falls into a coma and recovers (unseen) at the movie's end. Also, the main villain, Cobra Commander, met his own demise when he was turned into a living snake by mutant spores created by a new enemy, Cobra-La.

Filmmaker Gregory P. Grant made a film using old GI Joe figurines simply called Ode to GI Joe which played at film festivals and earned him a Student Academy Award.

A direct to video animated series was created for the Sgt. Savage line, packaged with an exclusive Sgt. Savage figure in 1994. Next in the G.I. Joe-based line of movies was the 2003 release of Spy Troops: The Movie, Hasbro's first computer-animated feature which coincided with the release of its "Spy Troops" header line. It is followed by Valor vs. Venom (2004), in response to sales from "Spy Troops". This was Hasbro's second commissioned feature using computer graphics to coincide with the line of the same name. By 2005, Hasbro had entered into an exclusive agreement with Paramount Pictures to have them distribute any future features based on the "Real American Heroes" line, but by the time a third movie was to be created, this time called, Attack of the BATS, Hasbro's sales on the "Real American Heroes" line had once again slumped, and the project was scrapped.

In 2009 Stephen Sommers directed a big budget Hollywood live-action movie based on G.I. Joe. The first film in what is intended to be a franchise, is G.I. Joe: The Rise of Cobra, stars Channing Tatum as Duke, Ray Park as Snake Eyes, Christopher Eccleston as Destro, Jonathan Pryce in the role of the President of the United States, and Joseph Gordon-Levitt as Cobra Commander. Tatum describes the film as being a cross between X-Men, Transformers and Mission Impossible: "It's a huge $170 million movie. It's just a big kid sort of driven film". The movie showcased the main members of G.I. Joe and Cobra. While some characters held true to the cartoon adaptations, others differed markedly in significant respects. As well, the storyline gave a different foundation for the battle between G.I. Joe and Cobra. The movie is based in present time (however at the beginning of the movie it states "In the not too distant future") and shows glimpses of each character's history. In the movie, Cobra sets out to cause destruction using high tech weapons and sell them to ruthless terrorists. The G.I. Joe members join to stop Cobra from becoming a global terrorist organization.

To promote the film, G.I. Joe: The Invasion of Cobra Island was produced as a viral campaign. The short animated two-parter used stop motion and puppet animation utilizing Hasbro's toy line, and was produced by R.M. Productions Ltd.

The sequel G.I. Joe: Retaliation directed by Jon M. Chu and starring Dwayne Johnson as Roadblock was scheduled to be released in June 2012 but was delayed until March 2013. In the film, the Joes are framed as traitors by Zartan, who is still impersonating the President of the United States, and Cobra Commander now has all the world leaders under Cobra's control, with their advanced warheads aimed at innocent populaces around the world. Outnumbered and out gunned, the Joes form a plan with the original G.I. Joe General Joseph Colton to overthrow the Cobra Commander and his allies Zartan, Storm Shadow and Firefly.

A reboot, Snake Eyes directed by Robert Schwentke and starring Henry Golding as the title character, was released on July 23, 2021. The film tells an origin story of the title character. The film received mixed reviews from critics.

The team appears in the end of Transformers: Rise of the Beasts, where Noah Diaz (Anthony Ramos) is invited to join the secret military organization G.I. Joe, who will cover his brother Kris' healthcare. On April 11, 2024, a crossover with the Transformers and G.I. Joe was announced in CinemaCon, with Michael Bay, Lorenzo di Bonaventura, Mark Vahradian, Tom DeSanto and Don Murphy returning as producers, and with a possible theater release in 2026. In July 2025, Ramos noted the film's uncertain status due to the Skydance-Paramount merger. The following year in April 2026, Caple Jr. confirmed that the crossover is still in development. He expressed his hopes to be involved in some capacity. Later that October, the film was officially canceled, with Paramount instead moving forward with an upcoming G.I. Joe film directed by Danny McBride. At the same time, Bradley Cooper was cast as Duke in McBride's project.

=== Video games ===
There were several video game adaptations of G.I. Joe, including G.I. Joe: Cobra Strike by Parker Brothers for the Atari 2600 and Intellivision (1983), G.I. Joe: A Real American Hero by Epyx for the Apple II and the Commodore 64 (1985), Action Force by Virgin Games for the Commodore 64 (1987), a G.I. Joe video game by Taxan for the Nintendo Entertainment System (1991), a G.I. Joe arcade game by Konami for arcades (1992), and G.I. Joe: The Atlantis Factor by Capcom for the Nintendo Entertainment System (1992). A game for Wii, Xbox 360, PlayStation 3, PlayStation 2, PSP and Nintendo DS was released to coincide with the first live-action G.I. Joe film, G.I. Joe: The Rise of Cobra. Another video game, G.I. Joe: Operation Blackout, was released for PlayStation 4, Xbox One, and Nintendo Switch in 2020. In 2025, Overwatch 2 also made a collaboration with them.

== See also ==
- Big Jim, a similar action figure series made by Mattel
- Eagle Force
- G.I. Joe's, a former sports store unrelated to the series closed in 2009
- The Story of G.I. Joe
