= G.I. Joe: A Real American Hero =

Military-themed line of toys and television program

- Type: Action figures
- Company: Hasbro
- Country: United States
- Availability: 1982–present
- Slogan: "A Real American Hero"
- Official website

G.I. Joe: A Real American Hero (also known as Action Force in Finland, Sweden and the UK) is a military-themed line of action figures and toys in Hasbro's G.I. Joe franchise. The toyline lasted from 1982 to 1994, producing well over 500 figures and 250 vehicles and playsets. The line reappeared in 1997 and has continued in one form or another to the present day. It was supported by two animated series as well as a major comic series published by Marvel Comics.

The toyline continues to play a large part in Hasbro's G.I. Joe franchise.

== Origin ==
"A Real American Hero" was created as a revival of the original 12 in (30 cm) G.I. Joe brand of the 1960s and 1970s. After the 12" figure had been absent from toy shelves for a few years, G.I. Joe was re-introduced in a 3 3/4 in (9.52 cm) action figure format following the success of the Star Wars and Micronauts 3 3/4″ scale toylines.

The genesis of the toy line came about from a chance meeting in a men's room. According to Jim Shooter, then editor-in-chief of Marvel Comics:

The President or CEO of Hasbro was at a charity event that Marvel's President was also at. They ended up in the men's room, standing next to each other peeing, and I think that's how they met. They were talking about each other's respective businesses, and it came up that Hasbro wanted to reactivate the trademark on G.I. Joe, but they were trying to come up with a new approach. [Marvel's guy] was like "We have the best creative people in the world! Let me bring in this Editor-in-Chief of mine and we'll fix it for you!"

Prior to G.I. Joe's relaunch in 1982, Larry Hama was developing an idea for a new comic book called Fury Force, which he was hoping would be an ongoing series for Marvel Comics. The original premise had the son of S.H.I.E.L.D. director Nick Fury assembling a team of elite commandos to battle neo-Nazi terrorists HYDRA. Shooter approached Hama about the Joe project due to Hama's military background, and the Fury concept was adapted for the project. Shooter suggested to Hasbro that "G.I. Joe" should be the team name and that they should fight terrorists, while Archie Goodwin invented Cobra and the Cobra Commander; everything else was created by Hama. Hasbro was initially uncertain about making villain toys, believing this would not sell. Marvel would also suggest the inclusion of female Joes in the toyline, and to include them with the vehicles (as Hasbro again worried they would not sell on their own).

It was decided that the comic book series itself would be advertised on television first, as opposed to advertising the toys directly for the time being. This was because television advertising for toys were subject to strict regulations such as to how long an advertisement could depict a toy in animation. By contrast, the regulations for a literary creation were much more lax, allowing them to depict animation for the entire advertisement.

Each G.I. Joe figure included a character biography, called a "file card". Hama was largely responsible for writing these file cards, especially for the first ten years. When developing many of the characters, he drew much from his own experiences in the US military. The overall premise for the toyline revolves around an elite counter-terrorist team code-named G.I. Joe, whose main purpose is "to defend human freedom against Cobra, a ruthless terrorist organization determined to rule the world," to quote the voiceover on the animated series' introductory segment.

Every year, Hasbro and Marvel would meet up to discuss the upcoming toys and marketing. Larry Hama was given free rein by Marvel's editors. Both the toys and the comics would become a great success, the comics being Marvel's most subscribed title at one point, but Jim Shooter has said sister company Marvel Productions, who handled the cartoon, overspent on production and had "a critical success but a financial disaster" with the show.

In 1994, Hasbro transferred control of the G.I. Joe toyline and brand name to the newly acquired Kenner division, who promptly cancelled the A Real American Hero toyline and replaced it with G.I. Joe Extreme. After brief revivals in 1997 and 1998, the toyline was revived as the "Real American Hero Collection" in 2000 to the mass market. In both cases, previous molds were reused and some characters had to be renamed due to trademark issues. Another relaunch was made in 2002 under the theme "G.I. Joe vs. Cobra" and new designs and characters were introduced.

Hasbro.com officially announced a new line of "25th Anniversary" 4″ G.I. Joe figures on January 18, 2007. The line is primarily based on the characters and designs from the early part of the Real American Hero line.

== Toyline ==
The action figures were 3 3/4 in (9.52 cm) tall, at roughly 1:18 scale. Throughout the original toyline production from 1982 through 1994, figure construction remained relatively the same. The most notable changes were the second series' addition of "swivel-arm" articulation in 1983 which allowed the forearm to rotate above the elbow (initial figures could only bend at the elbow), and the fourth series' ball joints replacing the former swivel necks, both dramatically increasing a figures poseability.

Hasbro also released various vehicles and playsets to be used with the figures. Many of the vehicles and playsets were based on, or influenced by, real or experimental military technologies that were deployed or being developed during the 1980s. Some examples of this among the vehicles released were the G.I. Joe Skystriker XP-14F fighter plane based on the F-14 Tomcat; the Cobra Rattler, which has similarities to the A-10 Thunderbolt II; the Dragonfly attack helicopter which was nearly identical to the Bell AH-1 Cobra; the Cobra Night Raven S^{3}P inspired by the Blackbird SR-71; and the M.O.B.A.T. tank which was modeled after the MBT-70. The Mobile Missile System (M.M.S.) playset was also strikingly similar to the MIM-23 Hawk surface-to-air (SAM) missile system, while the V.A.M.P. and its Cobra counterpart, the Stinger, were based on the FMC XR311 prototype combat vehicle and its derivative, the Lamborghini Cheetah. However, other toys were completely original and in-story incorporated technologies that were unavailable at the time such as the H.A.L. artillery laser, and J.U.M.P. jet pack.

=== File card ===
A file card is cardboard packaging with profile information, that accompanies most G.I. Joe or Cobra action figures. The owner of the action figure is encouraged to cut out the file card and save it. Over the years, the file card has evolved, but they generally contain the following information:

- A picture
- Indication of allegiance
- Code name of the character
- Function
- File name – the real name of the character
- SN, his/her serial number
- Primary military specialty
- Secondary military specialty
- Birthplace
- Rank grade
- A paragraph detailing the background of the character such as his/her education, upbringing, training
- A quote from an unidentified source, usually giving the owner an idea of the character's personality

For the enemy characters, most of the details are dispensed with, usually leaving only the picture, code name, function, descriptive paragraph and the quote.

The file cards for the first eight or so years were primarily written by comic book writer Larry Hama. Originally, Hama created "dossiers" as a way to keep track of the characters he would be writing. Representatives from Hasbro saw these "dossiers", and figured they would be an additional attraction to the action figures' blister packs.

They were known for giving much needed details about the characters, such as their specialties, education and training. So detailed were the file cards, that they even mention the military schools the G.I. Joe characters attended. The 1982 to 1984 file cards contained information on weapons specialties, but this was later removed over concerns that children were being given knowledge on firearms and also that a character would be limited in his weaponry.

The file card information would later be reprinted in a G.I. Joe comic book mini-series Order of Battle. The mini-series contained all new art by Herb Trimpe. The first two issues focused on G.I. Joe, the third on Cobra, and the fourth on their vehicles and equipment. The mini-series also corrects some of the grammar and misspellings from the original file cards.

The 1987 G.I. Joe toy line saw the release of Cobra hypnotist Crystal Ball, whose file card was supposedly written by bestselling horror novelist Stephen King. By 1988, the file cards no longer contained details about education, and focused more on the character's upbringing, or what he or she did prior to joining the G.I. Joe Team. In addition to the regular information, this new design of card also included a listing of which vehicle the character is licensed to operate. This would remain largely unchanged until 1991.

In 1991, in a major overhaul of the file card format, the paragraphs and the quotes were replaced by a short quote from the character him/herself, followed by a paragraph that hypes up the character's abilities. This would be the general format for all the file cards that followed.

=== Line history ===
==== A Real American Hero (1982–1994) ====
The first eleven characters were introduced in carded packs while four others were bundled with vehicles. The first series of action figures had straight arms with elbow joints. While it is common for many characters to share the same mold for producing a body part, it was much more noticeable in the first year as for the original thirteen G.I. Joe figure, only six head molds were created. Three unique molds were assigned to Stalker, Snake-Eyes and Scarlett, while the other ten characters utilized one of three generic heads. Despite these limitations, the new toyline was a success.

1982 arm compared to post-1982 arm

With the success of the first line of toys, Hasbro expanded the line the next year with new characters and more original body part designs. In 1983, "swivel-arm battle grip" articulation and some extra tweaks were added to the new characters and the existing figures in order to make them more poseable. In 1985, the base of the action figures' heads were given a ball joint which gave the figures' heads the ability to look up and down. Unlike the change to the arms, older figures were not rereleased with the new neck articulation.

The years from 1983 to 1985 are considered by many to be the golden years of G.I. Joe: A Real American Hero as many of the most popular characters were introduced around this time. Vehicles and playsets became bigger and seemed to top the design of the previous year, culminating in 1985's impressive USS Flagg playset, an aircraft carrier that measured 7 1/2 ft (2.3 m) long.

1982 neck compared to post-1984 neck

Like Hasbro's other main franchise at the time, Transformers, G.I. Joe saw its popularity peak around this time. This year is also notable for the overhauling of toy packaging, which the background artwork being changed from the familiar explosion background to a pixilated pattern of a red, yellow, and white explosion.

In toy stores, two of the largest playsets of the entire line were introduced: the G.I. Joe Defiant space shuttle and the Mobile Command Center. Before the end of the year, the G.I. Joe special team Battleforce 2000 was introduced in time for Christmas.

The toyline continued to sell well, despite its lack of media support. A new enemy, Destro's Iron Grenadiers, was introduced. The new Cobra line-up was composed mainly of Viper-type henchmen. Issue #86 of the comic series celebrated the 25th anniversary of the G.I. Joe toyline in general. Another G.I. Joe sub-group, Tiger Force, a line of classic characters and vehicles re-colored with tiger-striped camouflage patterns, was introduced before the year's end.

The relative success of Tiger Force the year before led to the introduction of Slaughter's Marauders and Cobra's Python Patrol in 1989.

The lackluster performance of 1989 convinced Hasbro to scale back on production. They concentrated on the action figure line-up and reduced the number of new vehicles for that year. The logo for the toyline was slightly redesigned as well. Special teams such as Ninja Force, Eco-Warriors, and Star Brigade were introduced.

In the final two years of the line, characters who were not part of any sub-group were branded as part of the all-encompassing Battle Corps. The background artwork for the cards was replaced by a design featuring laser-like lines. The Star Brigade sub-series was revamped with a more science-fiction storyline involving an extraterrestrial enemy, the Lunartix Empire.

The characters from the Street Fighter II video game became part of the G.I. Joe line up in 1993, as Hasbro bought the toy rights to the characters.

Although the line would officially end in 1994, design elements of the G.I. Joe figures and vehicles would continue in later toylines, such as a line based on the Street Fighter motion picture, as well as another based on the game's equally popular competitor, Mortal Kombat. The mold for the A.W.E. Striker vehicle from 1985 was also modified to accommodate larger figures for Hasbro's Stargate line.

==== Stars & Stripes Forever – Toys "R" Us Exclusives (1997–1998) ====
In 1997, G.I. Joe returned in a limited Toys "R" Us exclusive line. The Real American Hero Collection, as it is called, included Team Packs of three figures grouped together by a common theme such as Commando and Cobra Command, and Mission Packs, which featured classic figures packaged with a small vehicle like a Cobra Flight Pod or Silver Mirage motorcycle. The "Stars and Stripes" boxed set was also released, featuring members of the original thirteen Joes from 1982. The line continued as a Toys "R" Us exclusive in 1998.

One of the rarest G.I. Joe figures, the so-called "Pimp Daddy Destro" (or PDD for short), was released in 1997 in the Cobra Command Team pack. It was immediately replaced by a standardized version of the Destro figure. The PDD figure was so named for the fact that it had leopard-print accents on Destro's legs and his famous open collar. Only a handful were released into the market, with only one verifiable version mint in box and two loose versions known to be in existence. It is believed that the versions of PDD that made it to market were production samples (as opposed to true variants) and thus were not meant to be seen by the public. A Classified collection update of this figure was officially referred to as "Profit Director Destro" to maintain the abbreviation while avoiding the salacious associations of the original nickname.

==== A Real American Hero Collection (2000–2002) ====
In 2000, The Real American Hero Collection continued, this time in wide release. Figures were sold in two packs and continued using the original molds as well as 'kit-bashed' figures made from parts of various molds. The wide release of The Real American Hero Collection continued through 2001.

In 2002, the line was limited to one wave, which was only available to online retailers. Also in 2002, a set called the Sound Attack 8 pack was released as an exclusive to BJ's Wholesale Club and Fred Meyer stores.

==== 25th Anniversary (2007–2009) ====
Hasbro announced the release of G.I. Joe 25th Anniversary Edition figures, which features figures primarily based on A Real American Hero designs but with updated sculpting. The line continued through 2008 and 2009.

==== 30th Anniversary (2011–2012) ====
In 2011, a new series of figures were released, including characters from the G.I. Joe: Renegades cartoon series, and modernized updates of older characters.

Prototypes of the Hasbro 2011 Jurassic Park line used repainted 3.75-inch G.I. Joe figures and vehicles (nicknamed "Joe-Rassic Park" among collectors). One view was that they were conceptual mock-ups and stand-ins for the real product being designed. Another is that it was part of a pivoting reboot of the Jurassic Park line using G.I. Joe -style figures that would be cross-compatible with the G.I. Joe line. A less-articulated 3.75-inch scale action figure line similar to the earlier 5-inch scale line was adopted instead.

==== 50th Anniversary (2014–2016) ====
In 2014, to celebrate the 50th anniversary of G.I. Joe, a new series of figures were released, featuring more updates and modernizations to characters.

==== Retro Collection (2020–2023) ====
In 2020, Hasbro released a new line of super-articulated figures and vehicles, similar to Star Wars The Vintage Collection, utilizing retro-themed packaging. What began as a Wal-Mart exclusive line using mostly existing parts from the 50th anniversary and Pursuit of Cobra lines, it later transitioned to be exclusively on Hasbro's collector website, "Hasbro Pulse". This transition also included a change to the figures themselves as they were re-sculpted as O-Ring figures, based on the original molds (but not the original molds, even though they look similar). This line also started mixing with Hasbro's other massive in house toy property, "Transformers", to produce G.I. Joe vehicles that transform into robots. The last Retro Collection offering as of Hasbro saying the Retro Collection had been "put on hold", was a summer of 2023 pre-order for the Dreadnok Thunder Machine that transforms into Decepticon Soundwave. This set is to include an updated O-Ring Zartan, and an updated Zarana - made for the first time as she was originally designed with her left upper arm tattoo.

== Animated series ==
- G.I. Joe: A Real American Hero (1983 TV series) – a 95-episode animated series, produced by Marvel Productions and Sunbow Productions to follow the success of the toyline by Hasbro. The cartoon ran in syndication from 1983 to 1986. It included a short public service announcement cartoon at the end of every episode, in which a few of the G.I. Joes would instruct children on good behavior or how to be safe and ended with the catch-phrase: ... And knowing is half the battle!
- G.I. Joe: The Movie (1987) – an animated film created at the height of the G.I. Joe craze in the 1980s. In the film, it is revealed that Cobra was created by Golobulus, the ruler of an ancient race of part human/part snake/part insectoid people who were the rulers of the Earth before humanity, but their culture was all but wiped out by the ice age, and they fled to the Himalayas as humanity evolved and developed its own technology. Biding his time to retake the Earth, Golobulus sent a Cobra-La citizen, who turns out to be Cobra Commander, to go out and destroy humanity. When Cobra Commander fails, he is de-evolved into a snake in favor of Serpentor; it is also revealed that Golobulus implanted the inspiration to create Serpentor into Dr. Mindbender's brain with a small creature called a Psychic Motivator. The other Cobra heads, Destro, Baroness, Dr. Mindbender and the Dreadnoks agree along with Serpentor to help Golobulus take over the world in exchange for their preserved humanity. Golobulus wants the human race's Broadcast Energy Transmitter (or BET) so that he can accelerate the maturity of his space spores, which will shower the human race upon ripening and turn them into mindless animals, while all those in Cobra-La are protected by the Ice Dome. Only G.I. Joe stands in their way.
- G.I. Joe: A Real American Hero (1989 TV series) – a 44-episode animated series, produced by DIC Entertainment, and serves as a follow up to the 1985 series. The cartoon ran in syndication from 1989 to 1992. Although not as successful as the first series, it still ran for 2 seasons.

== Comic books ==
In 1982 when Hasbro relaunched their G.I. Joe franchise with G.I. Joe: A Real American Hero it was supported by a Marvel Comics series. The comic book history of G.I. Joe: A Real American Hero has seen three separate publishers and four main-title series, all of which have been based on the Hasbro toy line of the same name. The first series was produced by Marvel Comics between 1982 and 1994, running for 155 issues and spawning several spin-off titles throughout the course of its run. The second and third series, published by Devil's Due Productions from 2001 to 2008, totaled 80 issues and included several spin-off titles as well. The G.I. Joe: A Real American Hero series was revived as an ongoing in May 2010 by IDW Publishing, with #155 ½ and followed by #156 onwards in July 2010, picking up from the end of the Marvel Comics series, and written by original G.I. Joe writer Larry Hama.

== Action Stars Cereal ==
Cover of Starduster Mini-Comic #2 from Action Stars Cereal

In 1985, a cereal based on G.I. Joe was released called Action Stars Cereal. There were multiple variations of the cereal box, each featuring a different character from the G.I. Joe collection drawn in an action pose. Among the characters pictured were Duke, Gung-Ho, Shipwreck, and Quick Kick. The cereal itself was a collection of oat / grain pieces shaped like hollowed-out stars. The cereal was said to have tasted like Cap'n Crunch.

A television commercial for the cereal depicted a boy making his way to a bowl of cereal led by the character Duke. After eating the cereal, the boy flies into the air following another G.I. Joe character named Starduster. Of interesting note to G.I. Joe fans and collectors, this was the only time that the action-figure Starduster appeared in animated form. He was never part of the cartoon television series. Starduster was also featured in three out-of-continuity mini-comics packaged in Action Stars Cereal.

== Legacy ==
In 1989, the last wish of a West Virginia boy dying from brain cancer was to be a "G.I. Joe" for a day.

The G.I. Joe: A Real American Hero TV show and toy commercials were parodied in the Community episode "G.I. Jeff".

== See also ==
- Action figure
- Action Force
- Cobra
- G.I. Joe Team
- List of G.I. Joe series
