= Billy Kessler =

- G.I. Joe character

In-universe information
- Affiliation: G.I. Joe, Arashikage
- Specialty: Martial artist

Billy Kessler is a fictional character in the comic book series G.I. Joe: A Real American Hero. He is the son of the main villain of the series, Cobra Commander, but fights against his father and the forces of Cobra Command, learning martial arts under the tutelage of Storm Shadow, who helps him after a botched attempt on Cobra Commander's life. While still a boy, he loses an eye and a leg when a Cobra operative destroys a car in which he is riding, and after recovering he goes on to become a member of his father's greatest enemy, the G.I. Joe Team.

== Marvel Comics ==
=== Early life ===
He first appears as a boy being held captive by Doctor Venom in the town of Springfield. While the Cobra scientist uses the Brainwave Scanner on Snake Eyes, Billy befriends fellow captives Scarlett and Zap. He tells them of Cobra's takeover of Springfield, and then helps them break out and rescue Snake Eyes. The Joes offer to take him with them but he refuses, wanting to stay and fight.

In his next appearance, he is caught by Baroness and Major Bludd trying to break into an office and obtain information on the Arbco Circus, a front Cobra uses to transport equipment across the country. The two decide to train Billy to assassinate Cobra Commander at a massive rally. Despite the return of Storm Shadow from an extremely brief imprisonment by the Joes, and Destro finding out about the attempt, the plan is set in motion. The day of the rally, Billy is dressed in a Cobra Youth uniform and given a bouquet of flowers hiding a gun. He approaches Cobra Commander, but is stopped by the efforts of Storm Shadow and Destro. Cobra Commander wants to have Billy killed, but Destro forces him to recognize the child as his son. Billy recognizes Cobra Commander as his father as well. Despite this familial tie, Billy is put on trial and subjected to the Brainwave Scanner. Billy does not reveal who helped him plan the assassination. Storm Shadow is impressed and decides to defect from Cobra, freeing Billy and fleeing to New York.

=== Ninja training and injuries ===
Storm Shadow and Billy come to live and train in a dojo hidden in a water tower. Billy decides to one day head back to Springfield to confront his father. He ends up riding in a car with an intoxicated driver, and Candy Appel, the girlfriend of Joe member Ripcord. The car becomes trapped in a battle between Cobra operatives and the Soft Master. Scrap-Iron tries to destroy the car with a missile, but the Soft-Master throws himself in the way. Unfortunately Scrap-Iron fires another missile that destroys the car. Billy is the only survivor, but he loses part of his left leg and his right eye. He is taken to a hospital and falls into a coma.

A long time after, Cobra Commander and Destro are presumed dead, after almost being buried alive in the destruction of the Pit. While traveling in civilian disguise, a highway trooper sees the resemblance between Cobra Commander and Billy, and tells him of the wreck. Cobra Commander visits Billy in the hospital and is in shock over what happened. He takes Billy from the hospital and goes to Denver, where Fred VII is hiding out as an auto mechanic. Billy awakens from his coma, but with amnesia, and Cobra Commander has Fred VII fit him with an artificial leg. Billy almost trips, but uses a martial art move to right himself, unsure of how he did it. Billy spies on the dojo of a local martial arts sensei, and this sparks the return of Billy's memory. He confronts his father, but promises to leave him and not tell anyone where he is. Billy finds out the sensei is the Blind Master of the Arashikage clan, and also meets Jinx, the Blind Master's student. While the Blind master goes to help Snake Eyes and Scarlett on a mission, Jinx and Billy head to San Francisco. There Billy meets Hawk, Chuckles, and Law & Order of the Joe team, and tells Storm Shadow and Ripcord the fates of the Soft Master and Candy. He continues training with Storm Shadow, and with him joins Snake Eyes, Jinx, the Blind Master, and Scarlett in freeing a trio of Joes being held captive in the eastern European nation of Borovia. He also joins Storm Shadow and Jinx in aiding several Joes to free Hawk from a renegade general.

=== Later activities and brainwashing ===
Billy is eventually reunited with his mother. The happiness and normalcy is short lived, as Billy is confronted by Fred VII's old ally Raptor. Billy joins the Cobra operative along with Captain Minh, a boy named Tyrone, and a disguised Zartan in heading to Cobra Island to expose Fred VII as an impostor pretending to be Cobra Commander. The mission is interrupted by the return of the real Cobra Commander, who traps Billy, Zartan, Fred VII, Tyrone, Captain Minh, Raptor, and several others in a landlocked freighter, which he then buries under a volcano. After several months of digging, Billy and Zartan manage to escape, while most of the others die from tainted food. They head for Destro's castle in Scotland, and arrive just as Cobra Commander is attacking. The duo rescue Destro and Chuckles, and the four of them team with the G.I. Joe Ninja Force, eventually battling the Night Creepers and negotiating with Cobra Commander to call off his vendetta against Destro.

Billy then goes off on his own, but eventually returns to visit Destro. Unfortunately, his visit is at the same Cobra Commander arrives to brainwash Destro and Zartan back into his service. Billy and Baroness are held captive in the Silent Castle. Storm Shadow goes to rescue his former student, but is captured, and all three are subjected to the Brainwave Scanner.

== Devil's Due ==
In the years between the end of the Joe/Cobra conflict and its resurgence, Billy shakes off his brainwashing, but is left unhinged. He hides in Scotland, but is tracked down by Spirit and Kamakura, Snake Eyes' apprentice, to help rescue Snake Eyes and Scarlett. After this he joins the G.I. Joe team, training under Beach-Head. When Storm Shadow starts to come out his brainwashing, he contacts Billy for help. Billy in turn alerts Snake Eyes and Kamakura. The trio head to Los Angeles, but find Cobra Commander has beaten them to the punch, and is starting to re-brainwash Storm Shadow. In the fighting, Cobra Commander shoots and wounds Billy. The battle ends with Storm Shadow apparently back in Cobra Commander's service.

Billy appears again in the second "Master and Apprentice" mini-series, aiding Storm Shadow against the Red Ninjas. At the end, Billy is tasked by Storm Shadow with watching over the Red Ninjas.

Billy appears next during the World War III storyline. He allows himself to be captured, and is brought to his father while Cobra controls Fort Meade. Cobra Commander offers to let Billy join him but Billy refuses. He overpowers Cobra Commander's guards and tries to kill his father. Unfortunately, Cobra Commander fools him with an impostor, and then shoots him in the neck with a poison dart. Cobra Commander has Billy's body hoisted up a flagpole, with a message that no one is untouchable. When the Joes take the base back, Spirit tells General Colton they need to take Billy's body down, because "He was one of us".

== IDW ==
Billy appears in IDW's version of Real American Hero, a continuation of the Marvel Comics series. Still under Cobra's thrall, Billy is given regular Brainwave Scanner treatments to maintain his loyalty. Billy willingly subjects himself to these treatments, becoming more erratic with each procedure. It is revealed that Doctor Venom had implanted his memories and personality into Billy's mind using the Brainwave Scanner, allowing him to wreak havoc from beyond the grave. Snake Eyes and Storm Shadow (who has defeated his brainwashing) purge Dr. Venom from Billy's mind, and he joins them in investigating a threat to the Arashikage Clan.

Billy is killed during a battle against the cyborg Blue Ninjas, a group that despises the Arashikage. Snake Eyes and Storm Shadow take his body to Cobra Commander, who buries him.
