= G.I. Joe: Retaliation =

2013 film by Jon M. Chu

- Theatrical release poster
- Directed by: Jon M. Chu
- Written by: Rhett Reese; Paul Wernick
- Based on: G.I. Joe characters by Hasbro
- Produced by: Lorenzo di Bonaventura; Brian Goldner
- Starring: D. J. Cotrona; Lee Byung-hun; Adrianne Palicki; Ray Park; Jonathan Pryce; Ray Stevenson; Channing Tatum; Bruce Willis; Dwayne Johnson
- Cinematography: Stephen Windon
- Edited by: Roger Barton; Jim May
- Music by: Henry Jackman
- Production companies: Paramount Pictures; Metro-Goldwyn-Mayer Pictures; Skydance Productions; Hasbro Studios; di Bonaventura Pictures
- Distributed by: Paramount Pictures
- Release dates: March 27, 2013 (France); March 28, 2013 (United States)
- Running time: 110 minutes
- Country: United States
- Language: English
- Budget: $130–155 million
- Box office: $375.7 million

G.I. Joe: Retaliation is a 2013 American military science fiction film based on characters from Hasbro's G.I. Joe toy line. It is the second installment in the G.I. Joe film series and a sequel to G.I. Joe: The Rise of Cobra (2009). Directed by Jon M. Chu, and written by Rhett Reese and Paul Wernick, the film features an ensemble cast starring Dwayne Johnson, Bruce Willis, D. J. Cotrona, Lee Byung-hun, Adrianne Palicki, Ray Park, Jonathan Pryce, Ray Stevenson, and Channing Tatum. The story sees the G.I. Joes framed, attacked, and left for dead by the US government—influenced by Zartan who is impersonating the president—leaving the surviving members to fight back against Cobra.

Originally slated for release in June 2012, the film was delayed to convert to 3D and boost interest in international markets. G.I. Joe: Retaliation was released in the United States on March 28, 2013, by Paramount Pictures. Like the first film, it received generally unfavorable reviews from critics, although it was considered an improvement over its predecessor, and it grossed $375.7 million worldwide against a budget of $130–155 million.

== Plot ==
Special Forces team commander Duke leads the G.I. Joe Team to the Korean Demilitarized Zone to rescue a North Korean defector. They are then assigned to retrieve nuclear warheads from Pakistan following the death of its President during a civil war. Zartan, still impersonating the President of the United States, secretly orders an airstrike that kills Duke and most of the Joes. Heavy machine gunner Roadblock, sniper Flint, and covert operator Lady Jaye survive by diving into a well. The following day, Zartan denounces the Joes as traitors for allegedly attempting to steal the nuclear weapons they had been ordered to retrieve, and announces that COBRA, which he authorised to conduct the airstrike, will replace the Joes as the US' premier special operations force.

Roadblock, Flint, and Lady Jaye secretly return to the United States and establish a Base of Operations in a gym in Roadblock's old neighbourhood. Determined to avenge their fallen comrades, they investigate their betrayal. Lady Jaye deduces that someone is impersonating the President after noticing changes in his speech patterns. Seeking further intelligence, they contact General Joseph Colton, the original G.I. Joe, who directs them towards the President's Chief of Staff. Meanwhile, Storm Shadow, who survived the destruction of Cobra's Arctic base, (Note: As depicted in G.I. Joe: The Rise of Cobra (2009)) and demolitions expert Firefly rescue Cobra Commander from an underground maximum-security prison in Germany, leaving Destro behind. Storm Shadow is injured and retreats to a temple in the Himalayas to recover. The Blind Master, leader of the Arashikage Clan, sends Snake Eyes and his apprentice Jinx to capture Storm Shadow and bring him to justice for the murder of his uncle, the Hard Master.

At a presidential fundraiser, Lady Jaye steals a sample of the President's DNA, confirming that he is Zartan. The trio escapes after confronting Firefly and Zandar, the head of the U.S. Secret Service's Presidential Detail and a Cobra member. Meanwhile, Snake Eyes and Jinx capture Storm Shadow after battling his loyal ninjas and take him to Tokyo. Storm Shadow insists that he did not kill the Hard Master and proves it by fighting Snake Eyes with the weapon used in the murder; the weapon breaks because it is not made of Arashikage steel. The Blind Master concludes that Zartan murdered the Hard Master and framed Storm Shadow, who had joined Cobra to destroy it from within. Exonerated, Storm Shadow joins Snake Eyes and Jinx in helping the Joes stop Cobra and avenge the Hard Master.

Zartan invites the world's leaders to a summit at Fort Sumter, where he launches the entire US nuclear arsenal, forcing the other nuclear powers to launch theirs in response. He then activates his weapons' self-destruct systems before they reach their targets. The other leaders likewise destroy their nuclear arsenals to protect their populations. Zartan declares a nuclear-free world and unveils Project Zeus, orbital kinetic bombardment weapons designed for Cobra. To demonstrate their power, he destroys Central London and activates the remaining weapons, offering to disarm them if the leaders submit to Cobra. Storm Shadow turns against Cobra Commander and exposes Cobra's deception to the assembled leaders. Colton kills Zandar and rescues the real President with Lady Jaye, while Storm Shadow kills Zartan. As Snake Eyes, Jinx, and Flint fight Cobra's soldiers, Cobra Commander orders Firefly to defend the launch device before escaping by helicopter. Roadblock defeats Firefly and destroys the orbital weapons. Storm Shadow departs after avenging his uncle.

At a White House ceremony, the real President addresses the nation and commemorates the fallen Joes. Colton presents awards to Roadblock, Snake Eyes, Jinx, Flint, and Lady Jaye, and gives Roadblock an M1911 pistol formerly belonging to General George S. Patton, to use when they find Cobra Commander. Roadblock raises the weapon and fires a single shot in honor of his fallen comrades, vowing to avenge them.

== Cast ==
- Dwayne Johnson as Marvin F. Hinton / Roadblock:
  A heavy machine gunner and senior NCO of the G.I. Joe.
- Bruce Willis as General Joe Colton:
  A retired General and the founder and leader of the G.I. Joe team.
- D. J. Cotrona as Dashiell R. Faireborn / Flint:
  A sniper and parkour expert of the G.I. Joe.
- Channing Tatum as Conrad S. Hauser / Duke:
  An intelligence and infantry specialist and a field commander of the G.I. Joe team.
- Arnold Vosloo as Zartan:
  A disguise expert of Cobra who kidnaps and replaces the President in the last film.
- Jonathan Pryce as President of the United States
- Lee Byung-hun as Thomas Arashikage / Storm Shadow:
  A member of Cobra and Snake Eyes's rival. Both were close members of the Arashikage ninja clan. He survived his encounter with Snake Eyes in the last film.
  - Brandon Soo Hoo (through archive footage from The Rise of Cobra) and Nathan Takashige as Young Storm Shadow
- Ray Park as Snake Eyes:
  A mysterious ninja commando of the G.I. Joe who took a vow of silence, a close member of the Arashikage ninja clan, and Storm Shadow's rival.
  - Leo Howard as Young Snake Eyes
- Elodie Yung as Kim Arashikage / Jinx:
  A member of the Arashikage trained by the Blind Master, Snake Eyes' apprentice and Storm Shadow's cousin.
- Ray Stevenson as Firefly:
  An ex-G.I. Joe turned Cobra Demolitions expert.
- Adrianne Palicki as Jaye Burnett / Lady Jaye:
  A covert operator of the G.I. Joe.
- Luke Bracey as Cobra Commander:
  The leader of the terrorist organization Cobra Command.
  - Robert Baker (uncredited) as the voice of Cobra Commander
- Walton Goggins as Warden Nigel James:
  A warden of the Einsargen Subterranean Prison in Germany.
- Joseph Mazzello as Morris L. Sanderson / Mouse:
  A sniper of the G.I. Joe.
- RZA as Blind Master:
  The Arashikage's blind leader.
- Matt Gerald as Zandar:
  A member of Cobra and the head of the detail for Zartan disguised as the President of the United States.
- Joe Chrest as the Chief of Staff
- James Carville as Himself
- Ryan Hansen as Robert W. Graves / Grunt:
  One of the G.I. Joe members.
- DeRay Davis as 'Stoop'
- Robert Catrini as Israeli Prime Minister
- Ilia Volok as President of Russia
- Marcelo Tubert as President of France
- James Lew as President of China
- Ajay Mehta as Prime Minister of India
- Jim Palmer as Lance J. Steinberg / Clutch:
  One of the G.I. Joe members.

== Production ==
=== Development ===
After the financially successful release of The Rise of Cobra, Rob Moore, the studio vice chairman of Paramount Pictures, stated in 2009 that a sequel would be developed. In January 2011, Rhett Reese and Paul Wernick, the writers of Zombieland, were hired to write the script. The movie was originally thought to be titled G.I. Joe: Cobra Strikes, which was later denied by Reese. Stephen Sommers was originally going to return as director of the sequel, but Paramount Pictures announced in February 2011 that Jon Chu would direct the sequel. In July 2011, the sequel's name was revealed to be G.I. Joe: Retaliation. Chu would later declare that Paramount wanted a reboot that also served as a sequel to The Rise of Cobra since "a lot of people saw the first movie so we don't want to alienate that and redo the whole thing."

=== Casting ===
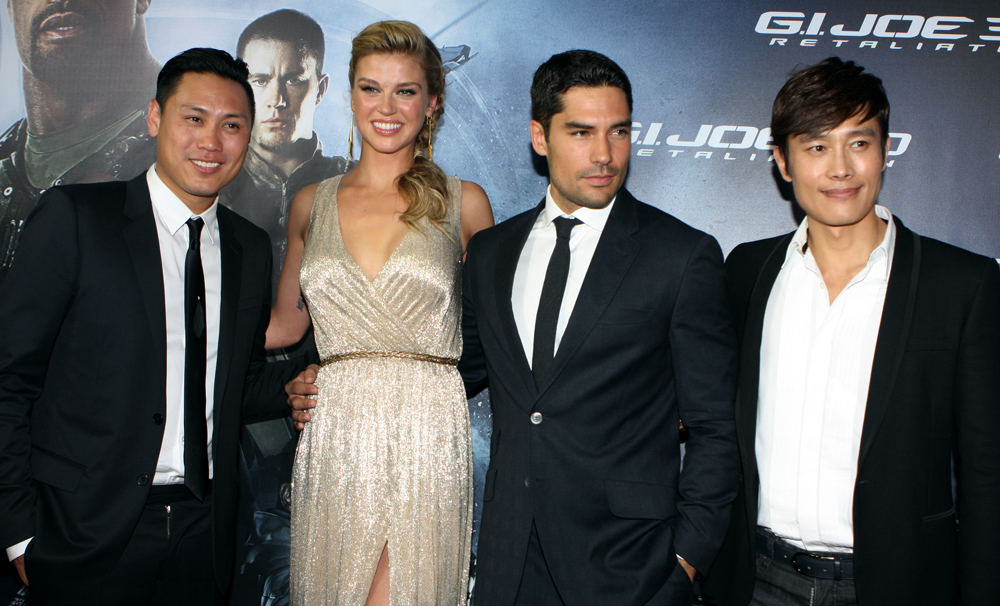
Director Jon M. Chu, Adrianne Palicki, D. J. Cotrona and Lee Byung-hun

In January 2011, it was confirmed that Lee Byung-hun would reprise his role as Storm Shadow in the sequel. Channing Tatum and Ray Park also returned, as Duke and Snake Eyes, respectively. Rachel Nichols, the actress who played Scarlett in the first film, stated that most cast members would not be returning, except for the three aforementioned actors. In March 2011, Sienna Miller stated that she would not be returning for a sequel. Joseph Gordon-Levitt also confirmed that he would not be returning as Cobra Commander in the sequel because he was too busy with The Dark Knight Rises.

In June 2011, Dwayne Johnson was cast as Roadblock, D. J. Cotrona and RZA were cast as Flint and Blind Master, respectively, while Élodie Yung was in talks for the role of Jinx. In July 2011, Adrianne Palicki was confirmed for the lead female role of Lady Jaye, and Ray Stevenson was confirmed to portray the villain Firefly. Arnold Vosloo also confirmed that he would reprise his role of Zartan. Jonathan Pryce will reprise his role as the President of the United States. Joseph Mazzello was confirmed to play Mouse. In August 2011, Walton Goggins was added as Warden Nigel James, and it was confirmed that Bruce Willis was cast to star in the film as the original G.I. Joe. The character of Joe Colton was a replacement for fan-favorite Joe character Sgt. Slaughter. Sgt. Slaughter stated that he "was originally supposed to be the part of Bruce Willis' [as] Sgt. Slaughter, but because we had a conflict in toy companies, Hasbro and Mattel, I wasn't able to do it. It's one of those things, Rock (Dwayne Johnson) doesn't have a contract so he can do what he wants to do and he's been very successful".

In September, a casting call sheet leaked to the Internet revealed that Cobra Commander would appear in the sequel, though it was unknown who would play the character. Chu said that fans would get a glimpse of Destro in the film, but Christopher Eccleston would not reprise his role in the sequel. On May 1, 2012, it was confirmed by Jon Chu that G.I. Joe: Retaliation's Cobra Commander is Rex Lewis, the same character that Joseph Gordon-Levitt played in The Rise of Cobra.

=== Filming ===
Principal photography began in August 2011 in Louisiana. The battle on the Himalayas was shot in the south vertical assembly building at NASA's Michoud Assembly Facility, that had been fitted with a green screen wall at a very steep angle with a lot of rigging above to swing the stunt people through. Fort Pike in Louisiana stands in for Fort Sumter in South Carolina as the site of the climactic summit meeting of the leaders of nuclear-armed countries.

==== Fatality ====
On November 22, 2011, a crew member, Mike Huber, died in an accident at a New Orleans warehouse used as a soundstage for the film. Crew members were changing out a set, and the scissor lift Huber was operating fell on him. OSHA assessed Paramount for a $21,000 penalty, some five years later the penalty was still being contested.

=== Visual effects ===
Retaliation had 700 visual effects shots, which were mostly handled by three effects companies. Visual effects supervisor Zachary Kinnery declared that while the visuals aimed for the "big and bold" typical of the franchise, Retaliation would be the first to attempt "a bit more of that gritty realism." The major part of the effects was given to Digital Domain, which for 227 effects created digital vehicles and aircraft that had to "look fantastic but which are also plausible", given they had to match practical models, the Zeus satellite and a sequence where Zartan shows his nanomite-related disguise to the president—done with the same head replacement software developed for The Curious Case of Benjamin Button and Tron: Legacy. Industrial Light & Magic made the London destruction, a digital White House, and the mountain sword fight, which had computer-generated backgrounds and digital augmentation of the stunt people's performance. Method Studios was responsible for the desert attack, Firefly's explosive bugs, and the malfunction in the underground prison. Saints LA handled minor effects such as compositing and news graphics.

=== Music ===
The film's score was composed by Henry Jackman, conducted by Nick Glennie-Smith and performed by the Hollywood Studio Symphony. A soundtrack of the score was released in April 2013.

== Release ==
=== Theatrical ===
Previously slated for release on August 10, 2012 and June 29, 2012, Paramount announced in May 2012 that they were delaying the film's release until March 29, 2013 (but was later moved up to March 28, 2013), to convert the movie to 3D and boost interest in international markets.

The delay "gobsmacked" the film industry due to Paramount's implementation of a substantial advertising campaign beginning with a Super Bowl commercial, with the "warehouses full of" toys were waiting for the film's launch, and because it was one of only three Paramount-produced films scheduled for summer 2012 (along with The Dictator and Katy Perry: Part of Me). The studio also wanted to avoid competing with Tatum's Magic Mike, also scheduled for June 29.

=== Ban in Pakistan ===
The film was banned by the Central Board of Film Censors of Pakistan due to initial scenes at the beginning of the movie which depict the country negatively, according to film censor board officials. A Karachi-based cinema posted on its Facebook page that the film would not be screened due to restrictions by the censor board. The censorship was due to the film's depiction of Pakistan as an unstable state and the fictional portrayal of a "foreign invasion of Pakistan's nuclear installations", which caught the ire of film censor authorities. Consequently, restrictions were imposed on screening the movie countrywide. According to an official at the censor board, the film portrayed Pakistan negatively not only on the issue of the war on terror but also on the international standing of the country, "There is a scene which shows the assassination of the Pakistani president and the imposition of martial law, which is not a fair representation of the country." Another cinema official said, "There were obviously several objectionable things which would never have passed the censors, but these things are also relevant to the content of the film."

=== Marketing ===
A toyline for the film was confirmed by Hasbro in February 2012. Despite the movie's release being moved from June 2012 to March 2013, the initial assortments of figures, vehicles, and role-play items were shipped to retailers and appeared on store shelves in May 2012. A Variety article was published stating that the already released figures had been pulled from the shelves and recalled by Hasbro, although the company's official statement indicated that existing product would be sold through. New product shipments were halted by Hasbro, but existing Retaliation figures were available in Target, Wal-Mart, and Toys R Us as late as December 2012. The toyline was re-released in the United States in February 2013. A four-part limited series comic book titled G.I. Joe: Retaliation Movie Prequel was published by IDW Publishing from February 2012 to April 2012. Written by John Barber, it acts as a prequel to the movie.

=== Home media ===
G.I. Joe: Retaliation was released on DVD, Blu-ray, and Blu-ray 3D on July 30, 2013, by Paramount Home Entertainment. A Blu-ray "Extended Action Cut" added 12 minutes of footage and uncensored violence was also available, with the United States version being a Best Buy exclusive. The film topped No. 1 on both the Blu-ray and DVD sales charts with at least 54% of both Blu-ray and DVD units sold. The film also topped weekend rentals too. It was later released on Ultra HD Blu-ray on July 20, 2021, along with the first movie, to coincide with the theatrical release of Snake Eyes.

== Reception ==
=== Box office ===
G.I. Joe: Retaliation grossed $122.5 million in the United States and Canada, and $253.2 million in other territories, for a worldwide total of $375.7 million, against a production budget of $130–155 million. It finished as the eighteenth highest-grossing film of 2013 worldwide, and was Paramount Pictures' third highest-grossing release of the year, behind World War Z and Star Trek Into Darkness. The film outgrossed its predecessor, G.I. Joe: The Rise of Cobra ($302.5 million), to become the highest-grossing installment in the G.I. Joe film series. Despite its stronger worldwide gross, analysts noted that its higher production costs and marketing expenses limited its profitability compared with the first film.

In the United States and Canada, Retaliation earned $10.5 million on its opening day, before debuting at number one with $40.5 million from 3,719 theaters over the three-day Easter weekend. Although it topped the domestic box office, the opening was 14.2% below the $54.7 million debut of The Rise of Cobra in 2009. During its second weekend, the film fell 49% to $20.8 million, placing second behind the remake of Evil Dead ($25.8 million).

Internationally, Retaliation substantially outperformed its domestic run, earning approximately 67% of its worldwide total. By late April 2013, it had accumulated $80.3 million overseas, led by China, where it opened to $33 million and became one of Paramount's strongest-performing releases in the market at the time. In the United Kingdom, the film debuted in second place with $4.1 million from 419 cinemas, finishing behind The Croods, which earned $4.9 million during the same weekend.

=== Critical response ===
On Rotten Tomatoes it has an approval rating of 29% based on 180 reviews, with an average rating of 4.5/10. The website's critical consensus reads, "Though arguably superior to its predecessor, G.I. Joe: Retaliation is overwhelmed by its nonstop action and too nonsensical and vapid to leave a lasting impression." On Metacritic, the film has a weighted average score of 41 out of 100, based on 31 critics, indicating "mixed or average" reviews. Audiences polled by CinemaScore gave the film an average grade of "A−" on an A+ to F scale.

Alan Scherstuhl of The Village Voice wrote in a positive review that "this [movie] pushes right past competent into mostly legitimately enjoyable" but added that "the movie is still dumb as catbutt. It's an honest and accomplished dumbness, however, where the stupidest stuff seems to be there because the movie would be less fun without it." The Hollywood Reporter's Todd McCarthy was critical about the film's use of 3D and accurate reflection of the franchise's comic book and cartoon origins, but predicted it would still earn better than its predecessor, G.I. Joe: The Rise of Cobra. Owen Gleiberman of Entertainment Weekly gave the film a grade of "B−", calling it "well-executed technocratic action fluff" and commented: "In its dehumanized and trivial way, it's a triumph of razor-sharp, hyper-violent style over formulaic substance ... Hollywood has now evolved to the point that it can deliver these kinds of thrills with maximum brute force and keep the impact so light that the result can still be regarded as a 'harmless' diversion for 14-year-olds." Glen Heath Jr. of Slant Magazine gave it two out of four stars, criticizing the film's "cut-happy style" and plot, but lauding the action sequences and Chu's direction as "poetry in high-speed motion."

In a negative review, Betsey Sharkey of the Los Angeles Times panned the "overwhelmingly complicated, globe-hopping, enemies within, enemies without story line" and 3D, but noted that "the humor, when it works, offers 'Retaliation' some redemption." She ended with: "It's convoluted. Frankly, no one should have to think that hard to keep up with the Joes." Another negative review came from Variety magazine's Justin Chang, who ridiculed the movie's large-scale destruction of foreign cities, writing: "Audiences who thrilled to the sight of Paris under biochemical attack in Cobra will be pleased to watch London endure an even more horrific fate here, although the sequence is tossed off in quick, almost ho-hum fashion, with no time to dwell on anything so exquisitely crass as the spectacle of the Eiffel Tower collapsing." He summarized the movie as "a more straight-faced brand of idiocy than its cheerfully dumb 2009 predecessor."

Writing for Empire magazine, Olly Richards gave the movie 2 stars out of 5 and compared it unfavorably with its predecessor, writing: "The first film you could at least laugh at. This takes all its silly ingredients and smushes them down flat. 'Retaliation' over-promises and under-delivers." Richard Roeper of Chicago Sun-Times gave the movie 1.5 stars out of a possible four, branding it a "ridiculous and overblown debacle" that contained "nothing but well-packaged garbage" and further adding: "To say 'G.I. Joe: Retaliation' is a video game for the big screen is to insult several video games that are far more creative, challenging, and better-looking."

=== Accolades ===
At the 2013 Teen Choice Awards, G.I. Joe: Retaliation received four nominations (including Choice Movie: Action). Johnson was nominated for Favorite Male Buttkicker at the 2014 Kids' Choice Awards. The film was also nominated twice at the Golden Trailer Awards for Best Action.

== Potential sequel and reboot ==
In April 2013, reports surfaced that there would be a third G.I. Joe film, and it would likely be in 3D. The studio announced that Chu would return to direct the third film. While at the 2013 San Diego Comic-Con, Chu talked about bringing Scarlett back in the next film. The writers of the second film are also thinking about bringing back the Baroness in the sequel. Johnson is interested in returning as Roadblock for the sequel, and Park has talked about a possible return as Snake Eyes and also including his pet wolf Timber. Producer Lorenzo di Bonaventura has stated he is open to doing a G.I. Joe/Transformers crossover, which Chu stated that he would be interested in directing. Bonaventura told Beijing News that he hoped that Johnson and Willis would return, the script is still in the writing stage, and that they are considering adding a third important role.

By September of the same year, Chu was confirmed to direct the film, along with Snow White and the Huntsman writer Evan Daugherty to pen the film's script. On December 5, 2013, Daugherty talked about writing the film's script and his feelings about Duke being killed, but Chu told MTV that Tatum may return as Duke in the sequel. In an interview with Collider, Johnson stated that he believes Chu may not return to direct, due to working on the live-action Jem film, but they may find another director for the film. In June 2014, di Bonaventura told Collider in an interview that they're meeting with new directors and filming may start in early 2015. The following month, Variety reported that Jonathan Lemkin will write the script for the film and will focus on Roadblock with Johnson returning. February of the following year, Film Divider reported that the twins Tomax and Xamot and Matt Trakker from the TV series M.A.S.K. will be appearing. In April, the studio hired Aaron Berg to write the film, and D. J. Caruso to direct the film. November 2015, Deadline reported that Akiva Goldsman will lead a writers' room for the next G.I. Joe film. In September 2016, Byung-Hun Lee told LRM Review that the studio doing the third film is waiting on the actors to return, including Johnson.

In January 2017, Caruso stated that the script for the crossover movie is now being written. In May 2017, Dwayne Johnson stated that if the opportunity arises he would appear in any future G.I. Joe film, and that he hopes to be a part of the franchise expansion as well. It was announced in September 2017 that the third film is intended to serve more as a reboot of the franchise. The Hollywood Reporter has reported that Paramount announced the film will be released on March 27, 2020. In May 2018, That Hashtag Show reported that the film will be titled G.I. Joe: Ever Vigilant with Josh Appelbaum and André Nemec writing the film's script and that the studio are hoping to have Johnson sign on to reprise the role of Roadblock. The plot will reportedly feature his character assembling a new team of Joes with Dania Janack, Dr. Adele Burkhart, Wild Bill, Barbecue, General Flagg, Doc, and Keel-Haul joining forces to stop Tomax and Xamot Paoli from launching a dark matter WMD. The film is said to feature a cameo role for Cobra Commander. In an interview with Entertainment Weekly, producer Lorenzo di Bonaventura revealed that some scripts for the sequel are currently in development. A reboot of the film series, Snake Eyes: G.I. Joe Origins, was released on July 23, 2021.
