= G.I. Joe: The Rise of Cobra =

2009 film by Stephen Sommers

- Theatrical release poster
- Directed by: Stephen Sommers
- Screenplay by: Stuart Beattie; David Elliot; Paul Lovett
- Story by: Michael B. Gordon; Stuart Beattie; Stephen Sommers
- Based on: G.I. Joe characters by Hasbro
- Produced by: Lorenzo di Bonaventura; Brian Goldner; Bob Ducsay
- Starring: Adewale Akinnuoye-Agbaje; Christopher Eccleston; Joseph Gordon-Levitt; Lee Byung-hun; Sienna Miller; Rachel Nichols; Jonathan Pryce; Saïd Taghmaoui; Channing Tatum; Marlon Wayans; Dennis Quaid
- Cinematography: Mitchell Amundsen
- Edited by: Bob Ducsay; Jim May
- Music by: Alan Silvestri
- Production companies: Paramount Pictures; Spyglass Entertainment; Hasbro Studios; di Bonaventura Pictures; The Sommers Company
- Distributed by: Paramount Pictures
- Release dates: July 31, 2009 (Andrews Air Force Base); August 7, 2009 (United States)
- Running time: 118 minutes
- Country: United States
- Language: English
- Budget: $175 million
- Box office: $302.5 million

G.I. Joe: The Rise of Cobra is a 2009 American military science fiction film based on characters from Hasbro's G.I. Joe toy line. It is the first installment in the G.I. Joe film series. Directed by Stephen Sommers, the film features an ensemble cast based on the various characters of the toy line. The story follows two American soldiers, Duke and Ripcord, who join the G.I. Joe Team after being attacked by Military Armaments Research Syndicate (M.A.R.S.) troops.

Development for the first film began in 2003, but when the United States launched the invasion of Iraq in March 2003, Hasbro suggested adapting the Transformers instead. After leaked drafts of the script were criticized by fans, Larry Hama, writer of the comic book series G.I. Joe: A Real American Hero, was hired as creative consultant, and rewrites were made. Filming took place in Downey, California and Prague's Barrandov Studios, while six companies handled the visual effects with Digital Domain as the main visual effects company.

G.I. Joe: The Rise of Cobra premiered at the Andrews Air Force Base on July 31, 2009, and was released in the United States on August 7, by Paramount Pictures, following an extensive marketing campaign focused on the Mid-American public. Despite mostly negative reviews from critics, the film grossed $302.5 million worldwide against a $175 million budget. A sequel, titled G.I. Joe: Retaliation, was released in 2013.

== Plot ==
Weapons master James McCullen has created a nanotech-based weapon—nanobots that can rapidly devour any non-organic materials. His company M.A.R.S. sells four warheads to NATO, and American soldiers Duke and Ripcord are tasked to deliver them. En route, their convoy is ambushed by the Baroness, whom Duke recognizes as his ex-fiancée Ana Lewis, before they are rescued by G.I. Joe operatives: Scarlett, Snake Eyes, Breaker, and Heavy Duty. They take the warheads to The Pit, G.I. Joe's command center in Egypt. G.I. Joe leader General Hawk lets Duke and Ripcord join the Joes after Duke reveals that he knows the Baroness.

McCullen is revealed to be using the same nanotechnology to build an army of soldiers with the aid of the mysterious masked Doctor, planning on using the warheads to cause worldwide panic and bring about a new world order. Storm Shadow and the Baroness, with help from Zartan, infiltrate the G.I. Joe base and steal the warheads. They take the warheads to Baron DeCobray, the Baroness's husband, to weaponize in his particle accelerator; after which, DeCobray is killed. The Joes pursue the Baroness and Storm Shadow in Paris as they launch one of the nanobot missiles. The missile hits the Eiffel Tower, destroying it, before Duke hits the kill switch, in the process being captured and taken to McCullen's base under the Arctic. The Joes pursue them as McCullen loads the three remaining warheads onto missiles aimed for Beijing, Moscow, and Washington, D.C..

Snake Eyes takes out one missile and Ripcord destroys the remaining two. Snake Eyes duels and defeats Storm Shadow, his childhood nemesis. Duke learns that the Doctor is actually Rex Lewis, Ana's brother, believed to have been killed by a mistimed airstrike during a mission led by Duke. Duke's guilt over Rex's death caused his breakup with Ana. Rex had encountered Dr. Mindbender and was fascinated by the nanomite technology, but was caught in the bombing, which disfigured him. Rex had implanted his sister with nanomites, putting her under his control as The Baroness. Attempting to kill Duke, McCullen ends up burned, and Rex and McCullen flee to an escape vessel. The Joes fall back after Rex activates the base's self-destruct sequence, causing the ice cap to explode.

Rex assumes the identity of the Commander, having healed McCullen's burned face with nanomites, which places McCullen under Rex's control. They are captured by the Joes. On the supercarrier USS Flagg, the Baroness is placed in custody until they can remove the nanomites from her body. Meanwhile, Zartan, having had his physical appearance altered by nanomites, infiltrates the White House and assumes the identity of the President of the United States, thus completing part of McCullen's plan to rule the world.

== Cast ==
=== G.I. Joe ===
- Channing Tatum as Conrad Hauser / Duke: The lead soldier. Producer Lorenzo di Bonaventura was originally interested in casting Mark Wahlberg, and when the script was rewritten into a G.I. Joe origin story, the studio offered the role to Tatum. Tatum had played a soldier in Stop-Loss, an anti-war film, and originally wanted no part in G.I. Joe, which he felt glorified war. Tatum turned down the role seven times before eventually agreeing. The actor later detailed that he wound up in the film due to a contractual obligation with Paramount, given Tatum signed a three-picture deal following Coach Carter. Tatum was a fan of the G.I. Joe franchise growing up, and expressed interest in playing Snake Eyes despite Paramount wanting him for Duke.
- Dennis Quaid as General Clayton Abernathy / Hawk: The Joes' commanding officer. Quaid described Hawk as "a cross between Chuck Yeager and Sgt. Rock and maybe a naïve Hugh Hefner". Quaid's son, Jack, convinced him to take on the part, and the filmmakers enjoyed working with him so much, Stuart Beattie wrote "10 to 15 more scenes" for the character. He filmed all his scenes within the first two months of production.
- Adewale Akinnuoye-Agbaje as Hershel Dalton / Heavy Duty: An ordnance expert and field commander of the team. Common was offered the role of Heavy Duty's cousin Roadblock, although Bonaventura previously indicated Heavy Duty was being used in that character's stead. Beattie ultimately chose to have Heavy Duty instead of Roadblock.
- Rachel Nichols as Shana M. O'Hara / Scarlett: Scarlett graduated from college at age 12 and became the team's intelligence expert. Having left school so early, she does not understand men's attraction to her. Nichols was the first choice for the role. Nichols had already dyed her blonde hair red—Scarlett's hair color—for her role in Star Trek, which she filmed before G.I. Joe. She burned herself filming an action sequence with Sienna Miller.
- Marlon Wayans as Wallace Weems / Ripcord: A pilot with a romantic interest in Scarlett. A fan of the franchise, Wayans was cast on the strength of his performance in Requiem for a Dream. Bonaventura said that the film showed Wayans could be serious as well as funny.
- Ray Park as Snake Eyes: A mysterious ninja commando who took a vow of silence, a departure from the character's traditional difficulty in speaking due to grievous vocal wounds, a close member of the Arashikage ninja clan, and Storm Shadow's rival. Park specifically practiced wushu for the role, as well as studying the character's comic book poses. Park was already familiar with the character, but knew very little of the surrounding saga of G.I. Joe versus Cobra, so he read the comics to further understand the character. He was nervous about wearing the mask, which covered his entire head quite tightly, so he requested to practice wearing it at home. He found the full costume, including the visor, very heavy to wear and akin to a rubber band; he had to put effort into moving in it.
  - Leo Howard as Young Snake Eyes
- Saïd Taghmaoui as Abel Shaz / Breaker: The team's communications specialist and hacker. He is seen chewing gum during the Battle of Paris in an homage to the original character.
- Karolína Kurková as Courtney Krieger / Cover Girl: Hawk's aide-de-camp. Kurková described going from her modeling career to making such a film as "an amazing experience", but said she was upset about not taking part in any action sequences.
- Brendan Fraser (uncredited cameo) as Geoffrey Stone IV / Sergeant Stone: Fraser was reportedly going to play Gung-Ho, but was instead later revealed to be playing Stone. According to the director's commentary on the DVD, Fraser begged director Stephen Sommers to be in the movie, making it his fourth collaboration with Sommers.

=== M.A.R.S./Cobra ===
- Joseph Gordon-Levitt as Rexford G. "Rex" Lewis / the Doctor / Cobra Commander: The Baroness's brother, a former soldier who was thought to have been killed during a mission led by Duke—instead, he became the disfigured head scientist of Military Armament Research Syndicate (M.A.R.S.). USA Today reported that Gordon-Levitt would play multiple roles. Gordon-Levitt wore prosthetic makeup under a mask that was redesigned from the comics because the crew found it too reminiscent of the Ku Klux Klan. Upon seeing concept art of the character, Gordon-Levitt signed on because; "I was like, 'I get to be that? You're going to make that [makeup] in real life and stick it on me? Cool. Let me do it.' That's a once-in-lifetime opportunity." Gordon-Levitt is a friend of Tatum and they co-starred in Stop-Loss and Havoc. His casting provided extra incentive for Tatum to join the film. Gordon-Levitt described his vocal performance as being "half-reminiscent" of Chris Latta's voice for the 1980s animated show G.I. Joe: A Real American Hero, but also half his own ideas, because he felt rendering it fully would sound ridiculous.
- Christopher Eccleston as James McCullen / Destro: A weapons designer and the founder of M.A.R.S. who is the main villain in the early part of the film. Irish actor David Murray was originally cast as Destro, but was forced to drop out due to travel visa issues. Murray was later cast as an ancestor of James McCullen in a flashback scene.
- Sienna Miller as Ana Lewis / Anastascia DeCobray / the Baroness: The sister of Cobra Commander and a spy. Years earlier, the Baroness was going to marry Duke, but he left her at the altar, due to his guilt over her brother's apparent death. Miller auditioned for the part because it did not involve "having a breakdown or addicted to heroin or dying at the end, something that was just maybe really great fun and that people went to see and actually just had a great time seeing." Miller prepared with four months of weight training, boxing sessions and learned to fire live ammunition. She sprained her wrist after slipping on a rubber bullet while filming a fight scene with Rachel Nichols.
- Lee Byung-hun as Thomas Arashikage / Storm Shadow: Snake Eyes's rival; both were close members of the Arashikage ninja clan. Lee was unfamiliar with G.I. Joe because the franchise is unknown in South Korea, but Sommers and Bonaventura told him that it was not necessary to watch the animated series to prepare for the role. Lee was attracted to Storm Shadow's "dual personality", which he stated has "huge pride and honor".
  - Brandon Soo Hoo as Young Storm Shadow
- Arnold Vosloo as Zartan: A disguise expert who serves Destro. This is Vosloo's third collaboration with Stephen Sommers.
- Kevin J. O'Connor (cameo) as Doctor Mindbender: A scientist in McCullen's employ who developed the nanomite technology. This is O'Connor's fourth collaboration with Sommers.

=== Other characters ===
- Jonathan Pryce as the President
- Grégory Fitoussi as Daniel DeCobray / the Baron: The husband of the Baroness.
- Gerald Okamura as the Hard Master: Snake Eyes and Storm Shadow's ninja master.
- Fahim Fazli as Camel handler

== Production ==
=== Development ===
Initial plans for a live-action G.I. Joe film go back to at least 1990, when a script adaptating the cartoon was in development at toy company Abrams/Gentile Entertainment (AGE).

In 1994, Larry Kasanoff and his production company, Threshold Entertainment, held the rights to produce a live-action G.I. Joe film with Warner Bros. as the distributor. Instead, they chose to concentrate the company's efforts upon its Mortal Kombat films. As late as 1999, there had been rumors that a film from Threshold Entertainment was still a possibility, but that project was never developed.

In 2003, Lorenzo di Bonaventura was interested in making a film about advanced military technology; Hasbro's Brian Goldner called him and suggested to base the film on the G.I. Joe toy line. Goldner and di Bonaventura worked together before, creating toy lines for films di Bonaventura had produced as CEO of Warner Bros. Goldner and di Bonaventura spent three months working out a story, and chose Michael B. Gordon as screenwriter, because they liked his script for 300. Di Bonaventura wanted to depict the origin story of certain characters, and introduced the new character of Rex, to allow an exploration of Duke. Rex's name came from Hasbro. Beforehand, Don Murphy was interested in filming the property, but when the Iraq War broke out, he considered the subject matter inappropriate, and chose to develop Transformers (another Hasbro toy line) instead. Di Bonaventura related, "What [the Joes] stand for, and what Duke stands for specifically in the movie, is something that I'd like to think a worldwide audience might connect with."

By February 2005, Paul Lovett and David Elliot, who wrote di Bonaventura's Four Brothers, were rewriting Gordon's draft. In their script, the Rex character is corrupted and mutated into the Cobra Commander, whom Destro needs to lead an army of supersoldiers. Skip Woods was rewriting the script by March 2007, and he added the Alex Mann character from the British Action Man toy line. Di Bonaventura explained, "Unfortunately, our president [George W. Bush] has put us in a position internationally where it would be very difficult to release a movie called G.I. Joe. To add one character to the mix is sort of a fun thing to do." The script was leaked online by El Mayimbe of Latino Review, who revealed Woods had dropped the Cobra Organization in favor of the Naja / Ryan, a crooked CIA agent. In this draft, Scarlett is married to Action Man but still has feelings for Duke and is killed by the Baroness. Snake Eyes speaks, but his vocal cords are slashed during the story, rendering him mute. Mayimbe suggested Stuart Beattie rewrite the script. Fan response to the film following the script review was negative. Di Bonaventura promised with subsequent rewrites, "I'm hoping we're going to get it right this time." He admitted he had problems with Cobra, concurring with an interviewer "they were probably the stupidest evil organization out there [as depicted in the cartoon]". Hasbro promised they would write Cobra back into the script.

In August 2007, Paramount Pictures hired Stephen Sommers to direct the film after his presentation to CEO Brad Grey and production president Brad Weston was well received. Sommers had been inspired to explore the G.I. Joe universe after visiting Hasbro's headquarters in Rhode Island. The project had found the momentum based on the success of Transformers, which di Bonaventura produced with Murphy. Sommers partly signed on to direct because the concept reminded him of James Bond, and he described an underwater battle in the story as a tribute to Thunderball. Stuart Beattie was hired to write a new script for Sommers's film, and G.I. Joe comic and filecard writer Larry Hama was hired as creative consultant. Hama helped them change story elements that fans would have disliked and made it closer to the comics, ultimately deciding fans would enjoy the script. He persuaded them to drop a comic scene at the film's end, where Snake Eyes speaks. To speed up production before the 2007–2008 Writers Guild of America strike, John Lee Hancock, Brian Koppelman and David Levien also assisted in writing various scenes. Goldner said their inspiration was generally Hama's comics and not the cartoon. Sommers said had it not been for the rich backstory in the franchise, the film would have fallen behind schedule because of the strike.

After Variety had reported that the film recharacterizes G.I. Joe as being a Brussels-based outfit whose name stands for "Global Integrated Joint Operating Entity", there were reports of fan outrage over Paramount's alleged attempt to change the origin of G.I. Joe Team. Hasbro responded on its G.I. Joe site that it was not changing what the G.I. Joe brand is about, and the name will always be synonymous with bravery and heroism. Instead, it would be a modern telling of the "G.I. Joe vs. Cobra" storyline, based out of the "Pit" as they were throughout the 1980s comic book series.

=== Filming and design ===
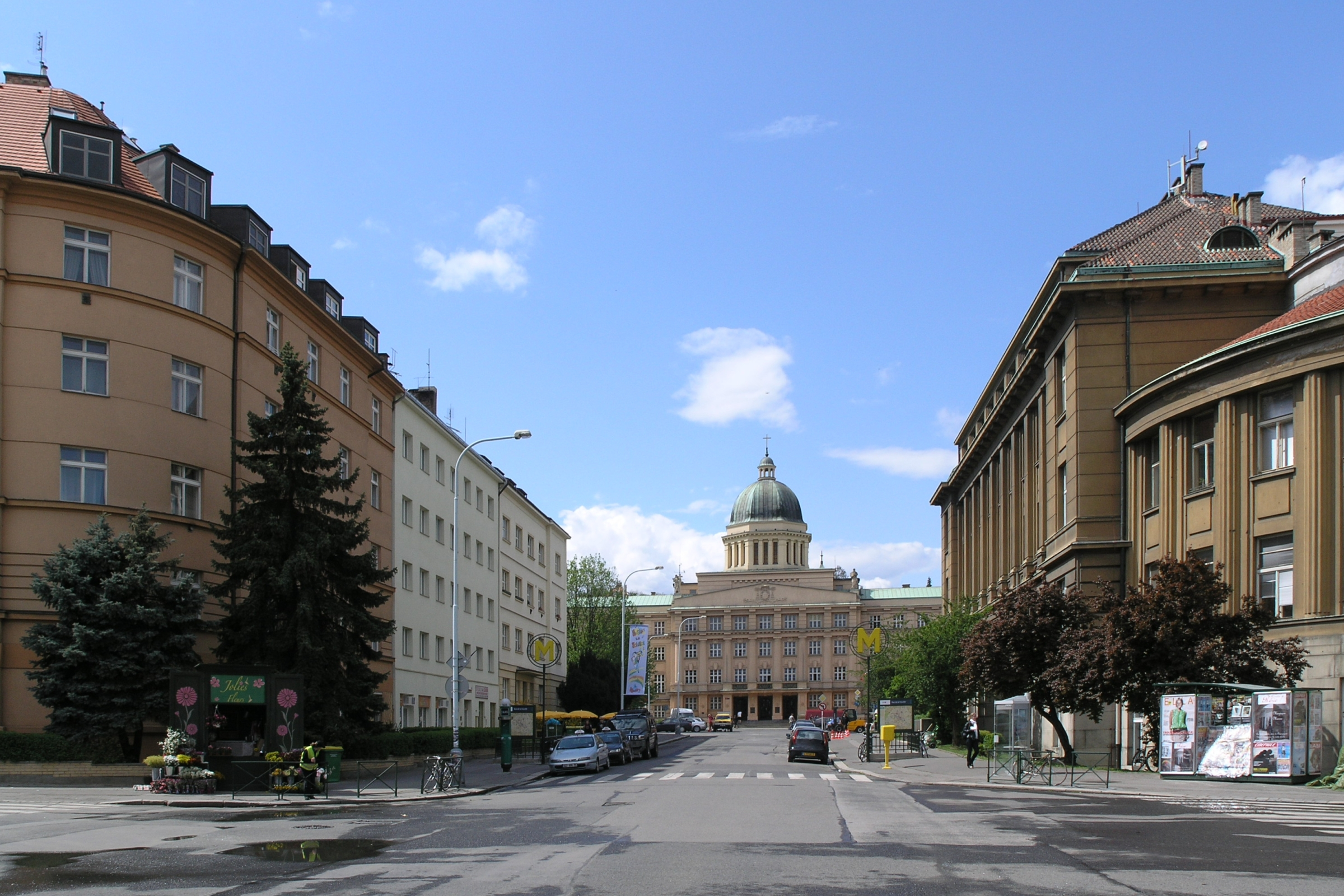
Prague was used for the Paris sequences.

Filming began on February 11, 2008, in Los Angeles, California. The Downey soundstage was chosen as Paramount needed a large stage to get production underway as soon as possible. The first two levels of the Pit were built there, to complement the rest of the building which would be done with special effects. Downey also housed Destro's M.A.R.S. base in the Arctic, his legitimate weapons factory in an ex-Soviet state, as well as filming various submarines' interiors, including a SHARC (Submersible High-speed Attack and Reconnaissance Craft) crewed by two G.I. Joes.

Filming in the Czech Republic's Barrandov Studios began in May. The crew took over sections of the Old Town in Prague. While filming in the city on April 26, people were injured when a bus and several cars collided with a four-wheel-drive vehicle that appeared to have braking problems. The emergency services confirmed those taken to hospital had minor injuries. Filming wrapped after a month in Prague. Additional second unit filming took place in Paris, Egypt, Tokyo, the Arctic, and underwater.

Sommers felt "almost 100 percent" of the technology in the film would actually become available within 10 to 20 years, citing the various books and magazines about developing weapons that he loved reading. For example, Sommers said he believed invisibility was impossible, but the virtual invisibility provided by a camouflage camera that projects the background of a soldier's body upon its front allowed him to include it. The production designers modelled the interior of Destro's private submarine on a Handley Page Jetstream. Sommers said the bulky immobile "accelerator suits" (which Beattie said had enabled them to write "a car chase where one guy's not even in a car") had been tough on the actors and were likely to have their roles reduced in potential sequels. Critics have compared the suits to that of NFL SuperPro, a comic book character jointly licensed by the NFL and Marvel Comics, and resembling an armored football player.

Di Bonaventura predicted that the aid offered by the United States armed forces to the film's development would be limited since much of the hardware depicted in the film is fictional. The filmmakers were denied use of MRAP armored vehicles at the start of filming as the Defense Department had just prioritized their deployment on combat operations; however, they were later permitted to film the vehicles at the National Training Center at Fort Irwin Military Reservation. Some commentators reviewing previews and promotional art from the film have noted superficial resemblances between it and the action film parody Team America: World Police.

=== Visual effects ===
Six visual effects companies worked on The Rise of Cobra, the most prominent being Digital Domain, which handled the Paris action sequences and the opening convoy sequence. For the Eiffel Tower destruction, special software was written for depicting how the crumbling metal works. To create the digital Eiffel Tower, the technicians had access to the original building plans, and built a digital model so complex that it could not fit in a single computer file. For the nanomites, designers used two proprietary software applications for their depiction—one made by Digital Domain, and another by Prime Focus VFX, which also created tools to generate 3-D cloud and sky environments for the aerial scenes. Many scenarios were almost fully developed by CGI, such as the landing platform of the Pit, the Cobra ice caves, and the final underwater battle. As for the sound effects themselves, only one is considered popular and isn't instantly recognizable. When the pulse cannon fires upon the main submarine during the polar assault, the sound of a program de-resolution from the 1982 cult movie classic TRON can be heard.

== Music ==
The film is composed by Alan Silvestri, who reunited with director Stephen Sommers to record his score with a 90-piece ensemble of the Hollywood Studio Symphony at the scoring stages at Sony and Fox. A soundtrack album of the score was released by Varèse Sarabande Records on August 4, 2009.

== Marketing ==
The film's actors were scanned for Hasbro's toy line, which began in July 2009 with the release of 3¾-inch-tall action figures. The Rise of Cobra toy line also includes 12-inch figures, and vehicles, including the first play set based on the Pit in the franchise's history. Electronic Arts developed a video game sequel to the film, also titled G.I. Joe: The Rise of Cobra.

IDW Publishing released a four-issue prequel written by Chuck Dixon. Each issue focuses on Duke, Destro, the Baroness and Snake Eyes, respectively. It began publication in March 2009. The weekly film adaptation was written by Denton J. Tipton and drawn by Casey Maloney. The film's universe continued in a limited series about Snake Eyes later in 2009: Ray Park enjoyed playing the character and approached writer Kevin VanHook and artist S. L. Gallant with the idea of a comic further exploring his incarnation of the character.

As part of the movie launch campaign, more than 300 twelve-inch, parachute-equipped, G.I. Joe action figures were dropped from a 42-story Kansas City hotel roof and soared across 500 feet to the ground at the 16th Annual International G.I. Joe Convention. For viral marketing, black helicopters with "G.I. Joe" written on them flew over American beaches. Tie-ins were made with Symantec, 7-Eleven, and Burger King.

Paramount's vice chairman Rob Moore claimed the movie was prioritized for mid-Americans, and thus marketing was more focused on cities such as Kansas City and Columbus. In Europe, the marketing was focused on action sequences set in Paris, Egypt, and Tokyo, and emphasized that G.I. Joe is an international team of elite operatives and not "about beefy guys on steroids who all met each other in the Vietnam War."

=== G.I. Joe: The Invasion of Cobra Island ===
In 2009, R.M. Productions Ltd. was contracted by Paramount Pictures Corp. to produce a viral marketing campaign for G.I. Joe: The Rise of Cobra. This resulted in the creation of G.I. Joe: The Invasion of Cobra Island, a two-part animated web video, which eventually went viral. The plot has G.I. Joe called in to stop Cobra when they develop a secret bio-weapon on their hidden island base. It was done in the style of Team America: World Police and Thunderbirds, using a mix of vintage Hasbro G.I. Joe vehicles of the 1980s, and the newly produced 25th-anniversary G.I. Joe figures. The characters were animated using custom puppetry techniques, while their faces and other special effects were done using 3D animation software packages.

== Release ==
=== Theatrical ===
The film was first screened in the US on July 31, 2009, at Andrews Air Force Base in Maryland. The premiere was at Hollywood's Grauman's Chinese Theatre on August 6, 2009, and on the following day, G.I. Joe started playing at 4,007 theaters in the US, along with 35 other markets.

=== Home media ===
G.I. Joe: The Rise of Cobra was released on November 3, 2009, on Blu-ray and DVD in regular and two-disc editions, and later as a book and as a video game. Both disc editions include audio commentary by Stephen Sommers and Bob Ducsay, and two making-of featurettes, with the second disc of the special edition holding a digital copy of the film. The film opened at #1 at the DVD sales chart, making $40.9 million from 2,538,000 DVD units in the first week of its release. The film sold more than 3.8 million discs, 500,000 of them on Blu-ray, during its first week. The film was released on Ultra HD Blu-ray on July 20, 2021, to coincide with the theatrical release of Snake Eyes.

== Reception ==
=== Box office ===
G.I. Joe: The Rise of Cobra grossed an estimated $54.7 million during its opening weekend (August 7–9) and opened at #1 at the North American box office from 4,007 theaters, making it the highest-grossing film of the weekend and marking the largest opening for a film based on the G.I. Joe franchise. However, its debut was below the opening weekends of both Transformers ($70.5 million) and its sequel Revenge of the Fallen ($109 million). Nevertheless, the film also performed strongly in international markets, earning an additional $44 million from overseas territories during the same weekend. Its combined worldwide opening of approximately $98.7 million made it one of the biggest global debuts of the summer 2009 film season.

In its second weekend, the film expanded into 14 additional international territories and remained at the top of the international box office, earning a further $26 million. Domestically, it dropped 59.2% to #2 earning $22.3 million behind new release District 9 ($37.3 million). The Rise of Cobra went on to gross $150.2 million in the United States and Canada and $152.3 million in other territories, for a worldwide total of $302.5 million. Against a reported production budget of $175 million, the film was considered a moderate commercial success at the global box office, although its theatrical earnings were lower than those of several other major action films released that year. It ranked as the 22nd-highest-grossing film worldwide of 2009.

=== Critical response ===
Paramount decided not to screen the film for print critics before its release and wanted to focus on internet critics. On Rotten Tomatoes, the film has an approval rating of 33% based on 166 reviews, with an average rating of 4.60/10. The website's critics consensus reads, "While fans of the Hasbro toy franchise may revel in a bit of nostalgia, G.I. Joe: The Rise of Cobra is largely a cartoonish, over-the-top action fest propelled by silly writing, inconsistent visual effects, and merely passable performances." On Metacritic, the film has a weighted average score of 32 out of 100, based on 25 critics, indicating "generally unfavorable" reviews. Audiences polled by CinemaScore gave the film an average grade of "B+" on an A+ to F scale.

One of the many complaints made by fans was that the film did not relate to the G.I. Joe franchise. G4tv.com stated that, "[the studio] actually went out of their way to butcher the G.I. Joe mythos in favor of derivative storyline devices." They cited the Baroness, who was changed from an East European noble in the comics to Duke's brainwashed ex-girlfriend in the film.

Dan Jolin of Empire magazine commented that it was "Bond without the style and Team America without the bellylaughs". The Daily Telegraph reviewer said, "The taint of cruddiness extends everywhere in this joyless stinker." James Berardinelli said the characters were "as plastic as the toys that inspired them" and considered Tatum "wooden" and that his character was "more animated in sequences when he is rendered by special effects than when being portrayed by Tatum". Roger Ebert described that "there is never any clear sense in the action of where anything is in relation to anything else". Chuck Wilson of The Village Voice criticized the dialogue and described the underwater battle as "absurdly overproduced, momentarily diverting, and then instantly forgettable". Manohla Dargis of The New York Times considered the plot "at once elemental and incomprehensible", and Peter Travers of Rolling Stone thought that, despite the high budget, the special effects "look shockingly crappy; the Eiffel Tower appears to be destroyed by some green slime left over from the Ghostbusters films". Reviewers also criticized the film for the scientific impossibility of sinking ocean ice.

Matthew Leyland from Total Film called it "a throwaway blast of solid, stupid fun" and gave it three out of five stars, particularly praising Joseph Gordon-Levitt's performance as the treacherous Cobra Commander. Sister publication SFX called the film "dumb and dopey, with plenty of bumpy bits" and that "GI Joe has a genuine cliffhanger charm, especially when the last act becomes a whole string of pulp plot twists. The ending screams 'To Be Continued'; we could do worse.", finally awarding the score of three stars out of five. Christopher Monfette of IGN also gave the film a positive review, saying "This is an adult's interpretation of a childhood phenomenon, and if you're willing to give it a shot, one suspects that you'll find yourself entertained enough to give your best, "Yo, Joe!" He gave the film three and a half out of five stars. Betsy Sharkey of the Los Angeles Times criticized the excessive flashbacks, but praised the action scenes and design, and considered that Marlon Wayans "steals the show". Dan Kois of The Washington Post describing it as "loudest, flashiest, silliest and longest blockbuster in a summer full of long, silly, flashy, loud blockbusters" thought it was "as polished and entertaining as war-mongering toy commercials get".

Cast members Eccleston, Tatum and Miller have been critical of the film in the years since its release. Eccleston admitted he took the role for the pay, stating that "Working on something like GI Joe was horrendous. I just wanted to cut my throat every day." In an interview with Howard Stern, Tatum revealed he was pushed into the role to fulfill a three-picture deal he had signed with Paramount. "I hate that movie [...] The script wasn't any good," said Tatum, though he expressed relief that it could have been worse. Miller, in an interview with Forbes, stated she was unaware of the sequel: "There was a second one? Well, they didn't bring me back [...] I shouldn't have played a villain in a comic book because I'm just not that villainous or tall or strong. I am internally, of course, but I couldn't fire a gun without blinking. I'm not a particularly physically threatening presence. The whole thing was a bit of a disaster from start to finish."

=== Accolades ===
Tatum won the Teen Choice Award for Choice Movie Actor: Action for his performance as Duke and the film also received three other Teen Choice Award nominations: Choice Movie: Action, Choice Movie Actress: Action for Sienna Miller, and Choice Movie: Villain for Joseph Gordon-Levitt. The film was also nominated for six Razzies including Worst Picture, Worst Director, Worst Screenplay, Worst Supporting Actor for Marlon Wayans, and Worst Prequel, Remake, Rip-off, or Sequel—with Sienna Miller winning the Razzie for Worst Supporting Actress at the 30th Golden Raspberry Awards becoming the biggest stump for 2010.

=== In other media ===
Inspired by the movie, The Ballad of G.I. Joe was released in 2009 on the website Funny or Die. Written by Daniel Strange and Kevin Umbricht, and featuring celebrities such as Olivia Wilde, Zach Galifianakis, Alexis Bledel, Henry Rollins, and Vinnie Jones, the video short parodies several characters from G.I. Joe: A Real American Hero by showing what they do in their spare time.

== Sequel ==
A sequel, G.I. Joe: Retaliation, was released on March 28, 2013, directed by Jon Chu.

== See also ==
- List of films featuring powered exoskeletons
