= Brian Goldner =

American business executive and film producer (1963–2021)

- Born: Brian David Goldner; April 21, 1963; Huntington, New York, U.S.
- Died: October 11, 2021 (aged 58); Barrington, Rhode Island, U.S.
- Education: Dartmouth College
- Occupation: Businessman
- Spouse: Barbara Goldner
- Children: 2

Brian David Goldner (April 21, 1963 – October 11, 2021) was an American business chief executive and film producer. He was the chief executive officer of the American toy and media company Hasbro from 2008 until his death.

== Early life ==
Goldner was born on April 21, 1963, in Huntington, New York, the son of Marjorie (Meyer), an investment adviser, and Norman Goldner, who worked at a power management company, Eaton. He attended Huntington High School and Dartmouth College in Hanover, New Hampshire, where he majored in politics. There he practiced public speaking and was also a radio disc jockey.

== Career ==
Goldner began his career as a marketing assistant at a healthcare firm in Long Island in 1985. In 1997, Goldner was set to head the entertainment accountant division of advertisement holding company JWT, but he was lured away by Bandai America. While president of Bandai America from 1997 to 2000, he befriended Power Rangers creator Haim Saban.

Goldner was working at Hasbro's Tiger Electronics unit in 2000, after the company had lost 5,000 jobs. By 2003, the company recovered on the stock market, and in 2008 Goldner became Hasbro's chief operating officer and in 2015 he was appointed chairman of the board.

He served as executive producer on the successful 2007 Transformers film adaptation, which was credited with broadening Hasbro into a character-based multimedia company. He continued this role on the 2009 films Transformers: Revenge of the Fallen and G.I. Joe: The Rise of Cobra. Goldner was responsible for making Hasbro a licensee of Disney's Marvel Universe characters.

Goldner compared the move of these characters to cinema during his tenure to the way they had expanded from mere adverts to television series in the 1980s. In 2012, Goldner's pay package was estimated to be around $9.68 million. In 2008, the year of his promotion, Goldner was named CEO of the year by MarketWatch.

In 2018, Goldner drew on his friendship with Saban to acquire first the master toy license for Power Rangers, then several months later the franchise and other properties from Saban Brands for $522 million.

In season 4, episode 8 of The Rookie, titled "Hit and Run", was dedicated to his memory.

Executive Producer

- Transformers (2007)
- Transformers: Revenge of the Fallen (2009)
- Transformers: Dark of the Moon (2011)
- Taylor Swift: Journey to Fearless (2011)
- Clue (TV, 2011–2012)
- Transformers: Age of Extinction (2014)
- Ouija (2014)
- Transformers: The Last Knight (2017)
- Hanazuki: Full of Treasures (2017)
- Bumblebee (2018)
- Power Rangers Beast Morphers (TV, 2019)
- Power Rangers Dino Fury (TV, 2021)
- My Little Pony: A New Generation (2021)
- Transformers: Rise of the Beasts (2023) (posthumous release)

Producer

- G.I. Joe: The Rise of Cobra (2009)
- Battleship (2012)
- G.I. Joe: Retaliation (2013)
- Jem and the Holograms (2015)
- Ouija: Origin of Evil (2016)
- My Little Pony: The Movie (2017)
- Snake Eyes (2021)
- Dungeons & Dragons: Honor Among Thieves (2023) (posthumous release)

== Personal life ==
Goldner married Barbara, a social worker. The couple had a daughter, Brooke, and a son, Brandon, who died in 2015. In 2017, a park playground in Providence, Rhode Island, was renamed "Brandon's Beach".

In August 2020, Goldner disclosed that he had prostate cancer and had been receiving treatment for this condition since 2014. He took an immediate leave of absence as CEO of Hasbro for medical reasons on October 10, 2021, and died a day later, at his home in Barrington, Rhode Island, at age 58.
