= G.I. Joe: Operation Blackout =

2020 third-person shooter video game

- Game cover
- Developers: IguanaBee; Fair Play Labs
- Publishers: NA: GameMill Entertainment; EU: Maximum Games
- Series: G.I. Joe
- Engine: Unreal Engine 4 Unreal Engine 5 (Xbox Series X/S)
- Platforms: Nintendo Switch; PlayStation 4 Xbox One; Microsoft Windows; Xbox Series X/S
- Release: Nintendo Switch, PlayStation 4, Xbox One; October 13, 2020; Microsoft Windows; December 15, 2020; Xbox Series X/S: WW: TBA
- Genre: Third-person shooter
- Modes: Single-player, multiplayer

G.I. Joe: Operation Blackout is a third-person shooter video game based on Hasbro's G.I. Joe toyline, released for Nintendo Switch, PlayStation 4, and Xbox One on October 13, 2020, and for Microsoft Windows on December 15, 2020. The game was developed by IguanaBee and Fair Play Labs and published by GameMill Entertainment in North America and Maximum Games in Europe. It is the first G.I. Joe console game since 2009's G.I. Joe: The Rise of Cobra.

== Plot ==
During an attack on the USS Flagg, Cobra has managed to take over the world by creating a device called the Blackout Sphere, which knocked out all electrical equipment across the globe and claimed Cobra's victory known as "C-Day". Now the Joes are being hunted down by Cobra and must figure out where their leader Duke is being held, find the other teammates, and take back the world from Cobra's clutches.

== Gameplay ==
In the base game, players can take on roles of 12 characters. Players can play the story missions with another in local split-screen co-op, or compete in up to four-player player versus player local matches in four multiplayer modes: Capture the Flag, Assault, King of the Hill, and Deathmatch Arena.

=== Characters ===
G.I. Joe Team	Cobra Command
Duke; Lady Jaye; Roadblock; Scarlett; Sci-Fi; Snake Eyes	Baroness; Cobra Commander; Destro; Firefly; Storm Shadow; Zartan

== Development ==
The game was announced on August 12, 2020. A trailer for the game was released the same day. Maximum Games handled publishing duties for the game in the PAL regions. On the day of the announcement, Chilean indie developer IguanaBee revealed that the game was their secret project for 2020. The game is available in a Digital Deluxe edition on all platforms.

On October 19, 2020, six days after the game's release, GameMill Entertainment announced that a Microsoft Windows version was in development.

== Reception ==
Reception

Aggregate scores
Aggregator	Score
Metacritic	51% (PS4); 56% (XONE); 55% (NS)
OpenCritic	11% recommend

Review scores
Publication	Score
Destructoid	5/10
Nintendo Life	5/10

On the review aggregation website Metacritic, the PlayStation 4 version of G.I. Joe: Operation Blackout has a score of 51% based on sixteen reviews, the Xbox One version has a score of 56% based on eight reviews, and the Nintendo Switch version has a score of 55% based on four reviews, all indicating "mixed or average" reviews. Fellow review aggregator OpenCritic assessed that the game received weak approval, being recommended by only 11% of critics.
