= Cobra Commander =

Fictional character/title from the G.I. Joe franchise

- G.I. Joe character
- Hooded Cobra Commander from G.I. Joe: A Real American Hero v2 #41. Art by Tim Seeley.
- First appearance: 1982
- Voiced by: Chris Latta (Sunbow & DiC series); Scott McNeil (Sgt. Savage and His Screaming Eagles); Michael Dobson (Spy Troops & Valor vs. Venom); Marc Thompson (Sigma Six); Charlie Adler (Resolute & Renegades); Rob Schrab (Community); Robert Baker (G.I. Joe: Retaliation); Keith Silverstein (G.I. Joe: Operation Blackout); Frank Todaro (Smite)

In-universe information
- Affiliation: Cobra
- Specialty: Founder and Leader of Cobra Command
- File name: Classified (canon); DeCobray, Adam (Renegades)
- Rank: Commander/Leader
- Primary MOS: Intelligence
- Secondary MOS: Ordnance (experimental weaponry)
- Subgroups: Battle Corps, Star Brigade

Cobra Commander is a fictional character and the main antagonist of the G.I. Joe: A Real American Hero franchise. He is the supreme leader of the terrorist organization Cobra and the archenemy of the G.I. Joe Team. He was portrayed by Joseph Gordon-Levitt in the film G.I. Joe: The Rise of Cobra, and by Luke Bracey with the voice of Robert Baker in the 2013 sequel G.I. Joe: Retaliation.

== Character biography and personality ==
Cobra Commander is a fanatical leader who rules with an iron fist and demands total loyalty or allegiance. His objective is total control of the world's governments, people, wealth, and resources, brought about by revolution and chaos. He is believed to have personally led uprisings in the Middle East, Southeast Asia, and other areas, while being held responsible for kidnapping scientists, businessmen, and military leaders, forcing them to reveal their top level secrets.

Across various storylines, Cobra Commander has survived multiple assassination attempts and internal coups, including being temporarily impersonated by an impostor. As the recurring primary antagonist of the G.I. Joe Team, he is depicted as an increasingly ruthless leader who repeatedly escapes capture and reasserts control over Cobra.

Dangerously destabilized, Cobra Commander's persona runs the gamut from friendly and charismatic, to terrifyingly brutal and psychopathic. His charm can twist intentions and morals, so that his rhetoric actually reads as plausible and relatable to his minions. Psychoanalysts who have studied his case files have described him as an ingenious hustler with visions of grandeur, which makes him all the more dangerous. Most dictators are hampered by pretending to pursue a noble cause, but Cobra Commander does not have that problem. He hopes to fray the fabric of society, using terrorism, tyranny, and economic slavery, to uproot the existing power structures around the world.

== Conception and creation ==
The character was created by Marvel Comics writer Larry Hama, who envisioned the character as "being in love with the sound of his own voice", and drew inspiration from famous conservative pundit William F. Buckley.

== Merchandising ==
Cobra Commander was first released as a mail-in figure in 1982. Wearing a light blue uniform and his signature battle helmet, early production runs were marked with an early version of the Cobra sigil, nicknamed the "Mickey Mouse" emblem for its more rounded shape. All of the original sixteen figures from 1982 were released with "straight arms". In 1983, the figure with the proper Cobra sigil was released on a card for mass market with "swivel-arm battle grip", which made it easier for figures to hold their rifles and accessories. In 1984, the Commander was offered again as a mail-away exclusive, this time in a darker blue, with the iconic hood that he wore prominently in the Marvel comics. This figure continued to be available as a mail-away figure until the line ended in 1994.

In 1987, a new Cobra Commander figure was designed, this time outfitting him in full-body battle armor. Cobra Commander was given another overhaul in 1991, wearing a blue and black ceremonial uniform, with an ornate redesign of his original battle helmet. Also in 1991, a "Talking Battle Commander" figure was released, featuring a blue and yellow uniform inspired by the hooded Cobra Commander figure. This figure was repainted in black with silver accents, for 1993's Battle Corps subset. A 12" version of the Commander wearing the same uniform (blue with yellow accents) was released in 1993 as well. In 1994, Cobra Commander was suited up for space combat as part of the Star Brigade. Wearing a teal and purple spacesuit, the Commander's domed helmet was removable, revealing a masked head underneath. This face is similar to the sculpt which lay under the hood of the 12" figure, with dark hair, and a half mask covering his nose and mouth.

After the line was canceled in 1994, Hasbro made several attempts to resurrect A Real American Hero through repaint series. In 1997, Cobra Commander was released as part of the "Cobra Command Team" 3-pack, using the 1987 Battle Armor mold in a dark blue. In 2000, the Talking Battle Commander mold was repainted (sans talking backpack) in an even darker blue, with silver highlights, with a new character "Chameleon" (a Baroness doppelganger created to sidestep copyright problems). A second repaint of the 1987 figure was made available in 2001, in a muted version of its original color scheme. It was also a double-pack with the 'Laser-Viper' figure.

=== Modern ===
In 2002, the Commander was initially meant to be redesigned by Hasbro. After the more radical elements were removed, the Commander emerged as one of the least extreme make-overs of the line, once again sporting the iconic hood. A second Commander figure was released in 2003 for Spy Troops, featuring a more military look than the Commander has ever had before, and using the Commander's signature Battle Helmet. Both figures went on to be repainted multiple times in 2004's Valor vs. Venom line, including one version with an interchangeable helmet and hood.

A 12" Cobra Commander was released to coincide with the Spy Troops line, based on the same design as its smaller counterpart.

A version of Cobra Commander with no accessories came with the Built to Rule Cobra H.I.S.S. in 2004. The figure featured additional articulation with a mid-thigh cut joint, plus the forearms and calves of the figure sported places where blocks could be attached.

=== 25th Anniversary ===
2007 was the 25th anniversary of the original launch of G.I. Joe: A Real American Hero. To celebrate, Hasbro created three boxed sets of brand new figures, featuring modern sculpt and updated and increased articulation (including the replacement of G.I. Joe's trademark O-ring construction). Cobra Commander was included in the inaugural Cobra set, along with Destro, Baroness, Storm Shadow, and a Cobra Trooper. The figure was rereleased on a single card, and repainted in black and gold for the "Cobra Legions" 5-pack, and in comic accurate colors for a Comic 2-Pack. Mirroring the vintage line, Cobra Commander was released with a hooded head sculpt in the first wave of single carded figures.

A second Cobra Commander sculpt, based on the 1987 Battle Armor figure, was released in early 2008. The Battle Helmet version from 2007 was repainted in cartoon accurate colors for a second single card release, and the "Cobra Senior Officers" 3-Pack. The hooded version was repainted for the "Crimson Guard" 3-Pack.

== Comics ==
=== Marvel Comics (1982–1994) ===
Cobra Commander first appeared in the Marvel Comics series G.I. Joe: A Real American Hero #1 (June 1982).

While Cobra Commander's birth name and childhood are unknown, he is believed to be a North American citizen born in the mid-twentieth century. His only known relative, an older brother named Dan, enlisted in the military during the Vietnam War, and volunteered for repeated tours to spare his younger sibling from conscription. During this time, the man who would become Cobra Commander worked as a used car salesman. When Dan returned from Vietnam, he displayed deep psychological trauma, and took to self-destructive behavior, resulting in his death in a car collision with another family. Devastated by the loss of his brother, the future Cobra Commander blamed the family's survivor: another war veteran, against whom the young Cobra Commander formed an elaborate revenge scheme.

Cobra Commander tracked the former soldier to Japan, where he was training to become a member of the Arashikage ninja clan. The Commander approached the mercenary Firefly to assassinate the soldier, but Firefly referred Cobra Commander to Zartan, another assassin who infiltrated the clan, but ultimately killed the wrong man (the Hard Master). Storm Shadow was blamed for the murder, and his search for his uncle's killer would eventually lead him to join Cobra, where he would pledge loyalty to Cobra Commander as his personal bodyguard, in order to get close to him and find the real assassin. The soldier left the ninja clan soon after, to live in seclusion in the Sierra Nevada mountains, until enticed to return to service on the G.I. Joe team as Snake Eyes.

Cobra Commander returned to his wife and newborn son Billy, but when his wife found out what had happened in Japan, she threatened to go to the authorities. Cobra Commander abandoned his wife, taking Billy with him. Living on the road and earning a living by increasingly illicit scams and con jobs, the soon-to-be Commander blamed all his problems on the American social system, and traveled in search of people who shared his desire to topple big business and the government, using money earned from pyramid schemes to attract followers. It was during these early meetings that he first began wearing a blue hood to mask his civilian identity.

He then moved operations to Springfield, an average small American town which had suffered economic collapse. Through his criminal skills he revived Springfield's' fortunes, and used cash and charisma to win converts to his cause. Eventually he seized control of the entire town and used it as a base to grow his organization into the paramilitary group "Cobra". This corrupting rise to power distanced Cobra Commander from his son, enough that Billy eventually joined the underground anti-Cobra resistance. From Springfield, Cobra's agents spread throughout the world, overturning or subverting unstable governments to establish criminal networks and profitable arms trades. The organization also explored dangerous and experimental technology, including mind-scanners and battle robots. Cobra became a significant international threat, becoming so large that Cobra Commander could no longer control it on his own. He created a "High Command" of his most skilled lieutenants, which included Zartan, Baroness Anastasia DeCobray, Scottish arms dealer James McCullen Destro, and Australian mercenary Major Sebastian Bludd.

This led to frequent power-struggles within the organization, and ultimately the Baroness and Major Bludd enacted a plot to assassinate the Commander, and seize control of Cobra. In a twist of fate, the conspirators recruited Billy to carry out the assassination, but he was intercepted by Destro. Cobra Commander had no qualms about torturing his own son to unearth the conspiracy, yet Billy refused to surrender who had sponsored the hit. Storm Shadow later freed Billy, and they both escaped to New York, where Storm Shadow trained him in ninjitsu. Billy was later caught in the crossfire between the Soft Master and Cobra agent Scrap-Iron, resulting in an explosion which seemingly killed Billy and several others.

During a failed assault on the Pit, the secret headquarters of G.I. Joe, Cobra Commander and Destro were separated from the main Cobra force by an explosion and presumed dead. The two escaped and assumed civilian disguises to travel incognito. Cobra Commander was depicted as an average, physically fit Caucasian with long hair in a ponytail, large round green spectacle-sunglasses, and a long slender mustache. Although only a convenient disguise at the time, this civilian look would resurface on subsequent unmaskings. A police officer soon recognized the Commander from a picture carried by an accident victim: the Commander's son Billy, who had survived the explosion, but lost a leg and an eye. Unnerved by the discovery, the Commander swore to take responsibility for Billy's condition, and promised to be a better father.

Still incognito, the Commander traveled to Denver where he sought out the undercover Crimson Guard agent Fred VII, a mechanical genius. Billy eventually awoke from the coma, with acute amnesia (and a new motorized prosthetic leg built by Fred). After an encounter with the Blind Master and Storm Shadow's cousin Jinx, Billy recovered his memory and immediately rejected his father, whereupon the Commander renounced the organization he had founded, declaring that his ambitions had cost him the only things that truly mattered. Fred VII, in return, shot Cobra Commander in the back, apparently killing him.

Fred VII then impersonated the Commander himself, traveling to Cobra Island to vie for control of Cobra with Serpentor (eventually sparking the Cobra Civil War). Unknown to Fred VII, he had been under surveillance by another Crimson Guardsman when he buried the Commander's body. This agent discovered that Cobra Commander was not dead, and brought him back to health. Thereafter, the Commander formed an underground network of loyal agents within Cobra, and rebuilt his personal fortune and influence. When Doctor Mindbender went to harvest DNA from Cobra Commander's body for the creation of a new leader, he discovered the empty grave, upon which the original Cobra Commander revealed himself and seized open control of Cobra.

Hardened by his "death" and betrayal at the hands of those he once thought loyal, the resurgent Commander was even more ruthless than before. His first act was to eliminate those who tried to murder him or subsequently learned of the act: Fred VII, Raptor, Firefly, Mindbender, Zartan, Billy, and numerous unnamed Cobra personnel, all of whom he had buried alive within a volcano. Later, he established a brainwashing program to compel allegiance from those around him, including Destro, the Baroness, Zartan, Storm Shadow, and Billy. The returned Commander was far more willing to kill, pulling the trigger himself rather than relying on others to kill for him, as when he murdered the Borovian rebels Magda and the White Clown.

As Marvel's G.I. Joe series drew to a close, Cobra Commander and Snake Eyes finally battled each other in issue #150. Snake Eyes eventually won against an armored Cobra Commander, but the Commander would have the last laugh, as he captured Storm Shadow and successfully brainwashed him back to the allegiance of Cobra. Shortly afterward, Cobra forces in Europe fell to a unified attack by regular military forces. In the wake of this conflict, most of Cobra's high command disappeared, and Cobra Commander himself became an international fugitive. Soon after, the military disbanded the G.I. Joe team.

=== Devil's Due (2001–2008) ===
Among the few revisions Devil's Due instituted was the expansion of Cobra Commander's origin. After his brother's death, the future Commander sought out the surviving son of the family killed by Dan. He found the soldier (Snake Eyes) at a bar, where the Commander saved him from an oncoming truck and the two became friends. They traveled from state to state, acting as vigilantes. One night, Cobra Commander took Snake Eyes to the house of a corrupt Judge who he blamed for the hardships they had both experienced: years before, the judge had presided over a case involving Cobra Commander's brother Dan, who ran a veteran's hospital. The hospital had been burned down by a patient, but the judge ruled that it was insurance fraud; Dan lost everything and turned to drinking, which led to the crash that took his life and the lives of Snake Eyes' family. Realizing where his anger had taken him, Snake Eyes refused to kill the man and walked away. Cobra Commander killed the judge himself and vowed revenge against Snake Eyes for having turned on him.

Years after the G.I. Joe Team has disbanded, Kamakura finds evidence that Cobra Commander has returned to the United States. Snake Eyes forwards this information to Duke, who uses it to have the G.I. Joe Team reinstated. Cobra Commander calls together the members of his organization, to let them know about his plan to take over the United States with nano-mites. Destro is the last to arrive, but after hearing the Commander's plan, he turns the tables on Cobra Commander, and takes control of Cobra.

Cobra Commander eventually regains control with the help of Storm Shadow, and creates plans to get revenge on both Destro and Hawk. Later, Storm Shadow breaks free of Cobra's mind control, and contacts Billy for help. Billy recruits Snake Eyes and Kamakura to assist him in rescuing Storm Shadow, but not before Cobra Commander brainwashes him again. A battle between Snake Eyes and Storm Shadow ends in a stalemate, leaving Storm Shadow in the control of Cobra Commander.

A distress call from T'Jbang leads the Joes to Tibet, where Cobra Commander and Storm Shadow are hiding with the Red Ninja clan. Snake Eyes defeats their leader Sei Tin, and becomes the new master of the Red Ninja clan. The Joes are then sent on a mission to Cobra Island, where Cobra Commander has returned to power. Meanwhile, Destro is double-crossed by the president of Sierra Gordo, and makes a deal with Duke to deliver Cobra Commander. Destro is traded for Cobra Commander, but not before the Commander shoots Hawk in the back, and in turn is shot from behind by the Baroness. Cobra Commander is freed by the Dreadnoks, and revealed to have been Zartan in disguise.

Cobra Commander takes back complete control of Cobra, and sends a unit to destroy The Pit, as Cobra discovers a weather control weapon named the Tempest, and moves it to their new Monolith Base in Badhikstan. Cobra uses the Tempest to unleash the Deathangel Virus on the county of Badhi, as G.I. Joe attacks Cobra's new stronghold. Cobra Commander escapes, but not before shooting Dr. Mindbender, who dies helping G.I. Joe to disable the Tempest. The Red Shadows organization then steps forward, targeting members of both G.I. Joe and Cobra. They are defeated by G.I. Joe, and the team is then deactivated by order of the President, given that Cobra as an organization has fractured, although Cobra Commander remains at large.

==== America's Elite ====
One year after the previous series, satellites begin falling out of orbit and crashing into major cities, resulting in massive civilian casualties. Believing Cobra is behind the attacks, the G.I. Joe Team is reactivated to confront the new threat. The team eventually discovers that a man named Vance Wingfield, who once attempted to start a nuclear war and was presumed dead, is behind the attacks. Meanwhile, Cobra Commander, who has been rebuilding his forces since the end of the previous series, infiltrates the U.S. government by disguising himself as White House Chief of Staff Garrett Freelowe. He tries to convince the President to shut down the G.I. Joe team. When he fails, he creates a new team called the Phoenix Guard led by General Philip Rey, a former G.I. Joe commander. The Phoenix Guard infiltrates G.I. Joe headquarters, and manages to capture several Joes, until General Rey discovers the true identities of the Phoenix Guard members. G.I. Joe then captures most of the Phoenix Guard, and after the failed attack on G.I. Joe headquarters, Cobra Commander abandons the White House.

The Baroness then pursues a campaign of revenge against her betrayers, Cobra Commander and Wraith. During her quest, she finds Wraith in a club in Prague, and lures him into a cemetery where she confronts and defeats him, shooting him in the head. She trades his armor to the Red Shadows, in exchange for information on the whereabouts of Cobra Commander. The Baroness locates the Commander in Honduras, but finds that Destro, her husband, is also present. After a brief fight, Destro agrees to trade the M.A.R.S. corporation, his Iron Grenadier forces, and his eldest son Alexander to Cobra Commander, in exchange for his and the Baroness' baby. Cobra Commander avoids capture, by revealing that he possesses the personal information of every G.I. Joe agent, because of his time working in the White House.

Cobra Commander uses his control of M.A.R.S. weapons to create conflict all over the globe, in a last bid to gain control of the world. G.I. Joe counters by going on the offensive, mobilizing the entire G.I. Joe roster, and launching missions to capture Cobra agents still at large. Meanwhile, Cobra Commander recruits soldier Nick Bailey, making him the last member of a new elite Cobra unit code-named "The Plague". The main G.I. Joe team heads to Israel, where they help stop an assassination attempt. While the team is away, Cobra Commander attacks Washington, D.C., taking over the White House and capturing the President. Cobra also takes over Fort Meade, while Alexander McCullen attacks London and France with the Iron Grenadiers.

Cobra Commander then sends Tomax and a squad of Night Creepers to "The Coffin", a prison in Greenland created to hold all of G.I. Joe's captured enemies. Tomax manages to free Major Bludd and several others, while killing those Cobra Commander considered "loose ends". Dela Eden, who had been freed from The Coffin, is recruited by Cobra Commander to find Destro and the Baroness, in order to kill them. Cobra takes over several nuclear arsenals, including one in Suffolk, England. As a warning, Cobra Commander detonates a nuclear bomb in The Empty Quarter, and then broadcasts an ultimatum on television for world leaders to accede to his authority, or he will start choosing populated targets. Billy, Cobra Commander's son, confronts his father at Fort Meade and tries to kill him. He fails, and Cobra Commander kills him instead, hanging Billy's body from a flagpole, with a message that no one is untouchable.

After the Joes defeat a plan by Cobra Commander to blow up nukes in the Amazon and Antarctica, Cobra Commander and The Plague retreat to a secret base in the Appalachian Mountains, where the first Cobra soldiers were trained. When the Joes attack the Appalachian base, General Colton is shot in the back by Cobra Commander, but survives. The battle ends, when Hawk tackles Cobra Commander, and knocks him out with a punch to the face. In the aftermath, the Joes are still active and fully funded, and Cobra Commander is locked away in a special underwater prison.

Hasbro later announced that all stories published by Devil's Due Publishing are no longer considered canonical, and are now considered an alternate continuity.

=== IDW Publishing (2008–2018) ===
In IDW's series, "The Commander" is a title and rank, not an individual, and there have been numerous Commanders in the past: they have been elected and placed in power by a ruling body called the Cobra Council.

The first Cobra Commander was a well-known famous businessman, operating as the Commander in secret. His uniform was a suit and tie, with gloves and variation of the silver face mask. Rather than having an army helmet over the blank face plate mask, the lower portion of the mask has fangs engraved around the jaw line. Unlike other incarnations of the character, this version of Cobra Commander – usually just called "the Commander" – is extremely reclusive, and his existence is only known to only select high-profile Cobra subordinates (such as the twins Tomax and Xamot and the Baroness). Cobra Commander's personality is also much more passive-aggressive and introspective; having captured the G.I. Joe spy Chuckles, Cobra Commander refuses to allow Tomax and Xamot to kill the spy, opting instead to personally recruit Chuckles, by taking him into his confidence and promising him revenge against Xamot.

In issue #12 of "G.I. Joe: Cobra", Xamot attempts to set up Cobra Commander to be killed and Chuckles to be blamed, only to learn the Commander has outmaneuvered him. Chuckles doesn't manage to kill the Commander, shooting him and missing. This is the first time a Commander has been killed in action, and a competition erupts in Cobra to find who will be the replacement, directed by the Cobra Council. The competition becomes a contest of who can kill the most Joes: competing Cobra agents include Baroness, Dr. Vargas, Major Bludd, Oda Satori, Tomax, Krake, and Raja Khallikhan. Baroness does not believe the Council would make her the Commander as she's a woman – not that this stops her from killing Joes.

Krake wins the competition, largely by revealing that he had killed and replaced one of his rivals with Zartan, doubling his kill score and showing the initiative to break the rules to win. Krake's origin would be given in Cobra Annual 2012: born in Southeast Asia's Golden Triangle during a battle and named Tiger Eyes, he grew up as a child laborer and later child soldier for drug gangs. He was named Krake by Major Bludd, who was impressed when he told Krake he had a spy in his gang and the man responded by killing every other member. Krake was invited to join Cobra, initially resisting but later providing the means to take over several Chinese triads.

The first action Krake takes as Commander is to openly invade the Southeast Asian nation of Nanzhao and steal its gold reserves. During the invasion, he destroys heroin poppy fields, so it initially looks to the world like Cobra is overthrowing a brutal regime and fighting the drug trade; it also drives up the price of heroin, a drug Cobra deals in. The Cobra Council are then slaughtered by Krake's agents, giving him full command of Cobra. Writers Chuck Dixon and Mike Costa have said that while the previous Commander allowed his subordinates to "pursue their own goals so long as they kick back to him" and was content to "profit invisibly", Krake "wants to be known and wants to be powerful, and wants to rule the world in the most supervillainy sense... With his leadership, Cobra shifts from a sneaky, shadowy cabal to an actual military presence."

G.I. Joe: Origins involves a psychotic ex-stock broker, who murders his family and several law enforcement officers when his crimes are discovered. Calling himself "the Chimera" and gathering a militia around him, he is one of the first villains that G.I. Joe faces. It is also noted that he started the sub-prime mortgage crisis of the late 2000s. Larry Hama had intended him to be Cobra Commander, but this idea was dropped with the introduction of the Cobra Council, and has not been seen since Origins #5. It has not been specified if he was indeed the Cobra Commander that Chuckles murdered.

=== UK continuities ===
In the UK Battle Action Force comic, Cobra Commander was originally known as Baron Ironblood, leader of the Red Shadows, a ruthless terrorist organization. The Red Shadows were legions of brainwashed fanatic soldiers armed with sophisticated, high-tech weapons. The group was declared the single greatest threat to world security by the UN, with Ironblood being labeled "World Enemy #1".

In 1985, Hasbro began moves to market G.I. Joe in the UK, under the Action Force name. This would affect the comic version of Battle Action Force, as the writers were to get rid of the Red Shadows and Baron Ironblood and replace them with Cobra and Cobra Commander. To preserve continuity within the comic, the decision was made to transform Baron Ironblood in to the Action Force version of Cobra Commander.

The transition came as Baron Ironblood grew tired of his group's failures and decided to destroy the Red Shadows, by secretly informing Action Force of the group's bases. Going into hiding, Ironblood relocated to Southeast Asia, where he had plastic surgery on his face, constructed a new mask and costumed identity (that of Cobra Commander), and underwent extensive treatment to give him immunity towards all forms of snake venom (a process known as mithridatism). He then began the process of recruiting a new inner circle and organisation, known as Cobra.

Unfortunately for Ironblood, his illicit fortune to finance this new army is stolen by former Red Shadow member, Red Jackal, who he is forced to rebuild as a cyborg (and rechristened as "Destro"). Furthermore, both surviving members of the Red Shadows and the retooled Action Force repeatedly foil his plans. In the final Battle Action Force storyline, after an attempt to locate the headquarters of the Action Force team fails and leads to a crushing defeat of his forces, Ironblood/Cobra Commander goes insane and collapses into a near catatonic state.

In Action Force Weekly, Cobra Commander is a featured character starting from issue #1, where he is depicted as bald. Destro believes Cobra Commander's excesses are the greatest risk to Cobra's success.

== Animated series ==
=== Sunbow ===
In the first season of the original 1980s G.I. Joe: A Real American Hero animated series, Cobra Commander is the leader of Cobra, described in the show's opening theme as "A ruthless, terrorist organization determined to rule the world". His face is always covered, either by a featureless chrome mask concealing his entire face or by a hood with eye-hole cutouts. He wears a blue military uniform, occasionally sporting a cape and carrying a scepter, depending on the occasion. His distinctively shrill, raspy voice was provided by Chris Latta. He had a knack for concocting creative schemes for world domination – including cloned dinosaurs, giant amoebas, miniaturized troops stowed away inside Christmas presents, and using a super-laser to gleefully carve a picture of his face on the moon – plans which his immediate subordinates, particularly Destro, often blasted as ridiculous. The writers later commented that they only found Cobra Commander's personality when they stopped writing him as an Adolf Hitler-type and started writing him more in the vein of Yosemite Sam.

Season 2 opened with the 5-episode mini-series Arise, Serpentor, Arise! in which Doctor Mindbender, disillusioned with Cobra Commander, decides to literally create a new leader to replace him. Acting as an operation to create a super-soldier, Cobra agents are sent around the world to collect DNA samples retrieved from the tombs of history's most notorious conquerors and military leaders to genetically craft Cobra Commander's successor. Fortunately for the Commander, G.I. Joe interferes with the gene collection to deny the critical inclusion of Sun Tzu's DNA, and it is instead replaced with Sgt. Slaughter's. During the first attempt to create the ruler, Cobra Commander contaminates the DNA mixture with a mutated virus, causing a rampaging monster. The second attempt is successful due to Scrap-Iron stopping Cobra Commander from sabotaging the experiment again, thus giving birth to Serpentor, who immediately assumes charge of Cobra and deposes the erstwhile Commander to the status of "lackey". Serpentor soon orders an attack on Washington, D.C., with the Commander in handcuffs. Cobra Commander convinces Dr. Mindbender to free him, as he knows how to use a weapon, and rescues the high command from certain disaster. He saves himself by convincing Serpentor that he truly needs him as a scapegoat.

Thereafter, Cobra Commander seems to be employed as Cobra's primary field commander, while Serpentor leads mostly from the Terrordrome. Serpentor even allows Cobra Commander to be the organization's second-in-command, a decision tolerated by the rest of the Cobra High Command. Cobra Commander spends much of Season 2 trying to reclaim his former glory from under Serpentor's domineering shadow, assembling his own secret society called The Coil to that end.

G.I. Joe: The Movie explains Cobra Commander's origin in full, while yet contradicting background information previously established in the animated series. Cobra Commander was a scientist and nobleman from the ancient, pre-human society of Cobra-La, now hidden in the Himalayas. Although humanoid in appearance, he has pale blue skin, no hair, and eyes with snake-like pupils. He was disfigured by volatile spores in a laboratory accident, mutating an array of eight additional eyes upon his visage, thus explaining why he wears a mask. Despite this deformity, his ambition was recognized by Cobra-La's ruler, Golobulus, and he was chosen to venture from their isolated Himalayan kingdom to establish an army for the razing of human civilization and reemergence of Cobra-La: that army is Cobra. This origin stands in contrast to the episode "Twenty Questions", where the Commander told an interviewing journalist that he was responsible for spearheading a mutiny at his military academy in his youth. In other episodes, aforementioned reactions to off-screen unmaskings or glimpses of the Commander's features are not in keeping with the inhumanly blue-skinned, reptile-man portrayed in the film.

In light of Cobra's constant failures, Golobulus decides to put the Commander on trial, via a kangaroo court, and punishes him by forcing his further exposure to the spores; their effect begins to devolve him into a snake. He escapes with Joe member Roadblock, but Cobra Commander's "humanity" slips away as his body transforms. He literally loses his human form, ultimately becoming mentally unresponsive and transforming into an oversized snake, as he repeatedly hisses "I was once a man!" During the Joe assault on Cobra-La, he is last seen coming to Lt. Falcon's rescue during the final battle and foils Serpentor's attack, allowing G.I. Joe to defeat Cobra-La and save the world.

A third season following the events of the movie was planned. In the storyline of Season 3, the Coil would become a criminal organization led by Tomax and Xamot and serve as the Joes' new enemy. For the first half of the season, Cobra Commander would be a secret character shifting alliances between G.I. Joe and the Coil, in order to destroy them both and rebuild Cobra, and in the second half, reveal himself in mutated form. The season was never produced, as the Sunbow series was abruptly canceled by Hasbro.

=== DiC series ===
After the movie, as seen in the sequel G.I. Joe: A Real American Hero series, Cobra Commander is still in his snake form and kept as a pet by Serpentor. However, Baroness restores him partly to a semi-human form—through exposure to an ancient primordial energy called Dragonfire, which is the focal point of the first five episodes of the new series. The basic shape of his body is humanoid, his skin and features are reptilian and he retains a taste for flies that he catches with his prehensile tongue. His intellect is fully restored, and upon being outfitted with his battle armor, Cobra Commander once again appears to be a humanoid male. He regains control of Cobra, and even dispatches Serpentor, using the new found Dragonfire energy to temporarily turn him into an oversized iguana. Cobra Commander's inhuman origins are never mentioned again, and he is never shown to have reptilian features again. In Season 2, he resumes wearing his original cloth mask, and his eyes and skin appear to be completely human.

Chris Latta returned to voice Cobra Commander for the duration of the DiC series, credited in both seasons as Christopher Collins.

=== Transformers ===
Cobra Commander as "Old Snake"

Cobra Commander appeared in the third season of the Transformers episode "Only Human". Set in the then-future year 2006, a trench-coated underground weapons dealer going by the name "Old Snake" is approached by crime lord Victor Drath, who wishes to purchase synthoid technology (as seen in a few episodes of the G.I. Joe animated series). Old Snake transfers the minds of Rodimus Prime, Ultra Magnus, Arcee and Springer into synthoid bodies, leaving their robotic shells for Drath's use in criminal activities.

Although it is never explicitly stated that "Old Snake" is actually an aged Cobra Commander, his raspy voice is again provided by Chris Latta, he wears the character's distinctive silver mask, and has visible traces of his blue uniform underneath his trench coat. He is identified in dialogue as the former leader of a terrorist organization that developed synthoid technology. At the end of the episode, Drath and his men are arrested, and Old Snake, being able to evade the authorities, laments about terrorists not being what they once were. He raises his fists skyward and starts to give the rally cry of Cobra, but breaks prematurely into a hacking cough.

This version of Cobra Commander was commemorated with the unlicensed "Snake" toy produced by Headrobots, limited to 300 pieces, and officially in 2015 as part of the G.I. Joe and the Transformers line released by Hasbro through the Transformers Collectors' Club. According to the profile included with the latter figure, Old Snake further experimented with Transformer technology, and after a failed experiment dubbed Serpent O.R., he revived the Battle Android Trooper program, creating the Advanced Stealth B.A.T., capable of transforming into an unmanned aerial vehicle.

=== Sgt. Savage and the Screaming Eagles ===
Cobra Commander appears briefly in the pilot episode of Sgt. Savage and his Screaming Eagles, having a video conference with General Blitz concerning the relationship between Cobra and Blitz's I.R.O.N. Army. He wears the uniform of his 1992 action figure, and is voiced by Scott McNeil in this appearance. General Blitz refers to ties between the two groups, and states that he had helped create Cobra. He then threatens to destroy Cobra if Cobra Commander interferes with Blitz's mission, but the Commander does not seem intimidated.

=== Spy Troops and Valor vs. Venom ===
Cobra Commander appeared in the direct-to-video CGI animated movies G.I. Joe: Spy Troops and G.I. Joe: Valor vs. Venom, voiced by Michael Dobson. Much like his Sunbow counterpart, Cobra Commander has a squeaky, raspy voice and often has comical moments of snapping at his minions.

He attempts to bolster Cobra's forces via androids and mutating civilians; though each attempt backfired due to his impatience and ignoring obvious flaws. By the second film, he is ditched by Cobra while lamenting his loss; allowing the Joes to detain him.

=== G.I. Joe: Resolute ===
In the miniseries, Cobra Commander is portrayed in a darker incarnation than the one in Sigma 6, revealing the attributes of cowardice and hysterics to have been only a mask for weeding out traitors and such among his organization, as well as to motivate his followers to think for themselves. He executes a plan to achieve world dominion through the High Frequency Active Auroral Research Program with a prototype particle beam weapon to hold the world hostage. He is portrayed as utterly ruthless, casually destroying all of Moscow just to demonstrate the beam's power to the United Nations and killing anyone in his organization who shows incompetence or threatens his command, such as Sebastian Bludd. Over the course of the story, Cobra Commander becomes more unhinged as his scheme unravels and his underlings are killed/captured, choosing to strike cities randomly instead of waiting for the United Nations to respond to his demands. Ordering his troops to defend the Springfield base where he has hidden himself, Cobra Commander slaughters his control team for the particle superweapon and takes shelter in a bunker as Duke arrives to disable the weapon, now aimed at the U.S. capital. As he gloats about his victory, Duke recalibrates the weapon to fire at Springfield instead, and Cobra Commander desperately tries to escape the nigh-indestructible bunker that Duke had forced shut as Springfield is destroyed. Despite this, Cobra Commander was found to be missing from the bunker when Duke made a return to the site. Cobra Commander was voiced by Charlie Adler.

=== G.I. Joe: Renegades ===
In the series G.I. Joe: Renegades, Cobra Commander is reinterpreted as a corporate businessman known as Adam DeCobray, CEO of the legitimate Cobra Industries, a multinational conglomerate which serves as a front for his terrorist organization, it is also revealed that Adam DeCobray isn't his real name. He is egotistical, but nowhere as arrogant and pompous in his promotional speechmaking as some of his other incarnations. Suffering a disfiguring terminal condition that resorts to him wearing a full breathing mask covered by plastic shielding wrap, Cobra Commander is forced to appear to the public as a normal-looking virtual simulation over video screens with only a few like Baroness knowing of his true appearance. Only Doctor Mindbender knows the full truth of his condition as Cobra Commander funds the scientist's research in hopes to achieve immortality. Charlie Adler reprises the role of Cobra Commander for this series.

While he is more ruthless and less incompetent than his previous versions, Cobra Commander still has an affinity for big, expensive schemes such as building a transcontinental, maglev train network to move weapons and resources across the country, making armies of Bio-Viper soldiers, and later the M.A.S.S. teleportation device. He doesn't participate in field work, carrying out most of his day-to-day activities from a high-tech bunker located under his mansion.

== Sigma 6 ==
In G.I. Joe: Sigma 6, Cobra Commander's profile has been modified, stating that he considers himself a warrior king. This rendition of the character possesses snake-like eyes as well as full battle armor. He wears a helmet that resembles a snake's head and covers his face with a hood. The snake staff he carries contains a number of hidden weapons systems. In the Sigma 6 animated series, the Commander was voiced by Marc Thompson. At the series conclusion, most of Cobra has been captured but Cobra Commander and Firefly are still at large.

Sigma 6 figures were heavily stylized with help by the Japanese animation company Gonzo. The Cobra Commander was released in the "Commando" collection in a new 8" scale, in 2006. Wearing body armor and a cape, the Commander still donned his iconic hood with a battle helmet on top of it. As an action figure, Cobra Commander had a spinning wheel built into his chest, which registered battle damage if hit. A repaint of this figure, without the battle-damage feature and new weapons, was released in black and silver. A second, more radical repaint followed in 2007, with the Commander's armor painted silver, and an air chariot included as an accessory.

The Commander was also released in the 2.5" line, initially as part of the "B.A.T. Attack" figure 4-pack. A second version was included with the H.I.S.S. Tank.

== Live action films ==
Cobra Commander
- G.I. Joe character
- Luke Bracey as Cobra Commander in G.I. Joe: Retaliation
- First appearance: 2009
- Portrayed by: Joseph Gordon-Levitt (G.I. Joe: The Rise of Cobra); Luke Bracey (G.I. Joe: Retaliation)
- Voiced by: Robert Baker (G.I. Joe: Retaliation)

In-universe information
- Affiliation: Cobra
- Specialty: Founder and Leader of Cobra Command
- File name: Rexford G. "Rex" Lewis
- Birth place: America
- SN: Unknown
- Rank: Commander
- Series: G.I. Joe: The Rise of Cobra; G.I. Joe: Retaliation

Cobra Commander appears in the movie G.I. Joe: The Rise of Cobra played by Joseph Gordon-Levitt. Gordon-Levitt wore a mask and prosthetic makeup underneath. Upon seeing concept art of the role he was being offered, Gordon-Levitt signed on because; "I saw the designs and drawings of the way they interpreted my character for this movie – the costume, the whole getup – and I was like, 'Oh, wow. I get to be that guy? Fantastic. Sign me up. Please. Thank you.'" Gordon-Levitt described his vocal performance as being half reminiscent of Chris Latta's voice for the 1980s cartoon, but also half his own ideas, because he felt rendering it fully would sound ridiculous. The hood was not used in the movie, due to concerns that it would resemble the hood used by the KKK.

For most of the movie, he is referred to as The Doctor, a "mad" scientist working with James McCullen researching military uses of nanomites. It is revealed that he was Rexford G. "Rex" Lewis, the younger brother of Ana Lewis, and once a military science officer alongside Duke, his friend and mentor. When an enemy East African location is destroyed prematurely by an air strike, Rex is presumed dead. However, just prior to the explosion, Rex witnessed McCullen's experimental research on nanomites, conducted by Doctor Mindbender. Surviving the incident, scarred and requiring a special mask to breathe, Rex learns from Mindbender and perfects the nanomites. He uses his own sister as a test subject in creating the Neo-Vipers, making her the Cobra agent known as the Baroness. Rex holds a grudge against Duke for leaving him to die. When Duke is captured, Rex reveals himself, as he attempts to inject Duke with the nanomites, the Baroness overcomes her programming and saves Duke, while Rex escapes with a badly burned McCullen. Rex uses specially made nanomites to heal McCullen's face, which also encases it in a living, silver-like metal. Dubbing him "Destro", Rex puts on a new breathing mask and tells McCullen to call him Commander. Although he is arrested and placed in a high security prison aboard the USS Flagg, Cobra Commander's master plan has only begun, with Zartan disguised as the President of the United States.

Cobra Commander returns in G.I. Joe: Retaliation, played by Australian actor Luke Bracey and voiced by Robert Baker. Director Jon Chu suggested in a March 2012 interview that this Cobra Commander is not the same character played by Joseph Gordon-Levitt in The Rise of Cobra, but in May 2012 confirmed that the Cobra Commander of Retaliation is indeed still Rex Lewis. He features an altered appearance from the first film, more similar to his helmeted look from the G.I. Joe: A Real American Hero cartoon.

In the movie, Cobra Commander has been transferred from the FLAGG to another high-security prison in Germany alongside Destro, where he is being force-fed a paralyzing drug whilst floating in a water chamber. He is soon broken out by Storm Shadow and Firefly, but Destro is left behind and Storm Shadow is injured as the base is destroyed. After sending Storm Shadow off to the Himalayas to heal, Cobra Commander retreats to his own base of operations, where he meets with Zartan (still disguised as the President). They reveal Project Zeus, a super weapon, which uses kinetic bombardment and targets several prominent cities. Cobra Commander demonstrates the magnitude of the weapon's power in front of the world's leaders by destroying London. The Joes are able to stop Cobra Commander before he unleashes the full power of Zeus, but the terrorist leader escapes after the deaths of Zartan and Firefly.

Cobra Commander will appear in G.I. Joe: Ever Vigilant for a cameo appearance.

== Video games ==
- Cobra Commander is one of the featured villains in the 1985 G.I. Joe: A Real American Hero computer game.
- Cobra Commander appeared as the final boss in the 1991 G.I. Joe video game, in 1992's G.I. Joe: The Atlantis Factor for the Nintendo Entertainment System, and Konami's G.I. Joe arcade game.
- In the video game G.I. Joe: The Rise of Cobra, he is the fourth and final boss, who is fought towards the end of the "Cobra Base" act. Joseph Gordon-Levitt reprises his role.
- Cobra Commander appears in the 2020 video game, G.I. Joe: Operation Blackout.
- Cobra Commander appears as a skin in the game Overwatch, in July 2025 as a part of the games collaboration with G.I. Joe.

== Other works ==
Cobra Commander's figure is briefly featured in the fiction novel 6 Sick Hipsters. In the story, the character Paul Achting spent four years collecting G.I. Joe figures to set up a battle scene between the Joes and Cobra. As he imagined the characters in his head, he observed the "core of Cobra Command" atop an oak toy chest, high above the thick shag carpet, and "the hooded Cobra Commander, looking like a blue klansman, was loading his black laser pistol and making small talk with Destro".

Cobra Commander is briefly featured in the webcomic Casey and Andy by Andy Weir, in which his new mask is mistakenly delivered to Doctor X and vice versa.

The commander's business ventures and identity issues are discussed in the non-fiction book Powerplay.

His works with secret bases is discussed in the paperback Saturday Morning Fever.

His general background is examined in the non-fiction The End of Victory Culture.

The merits of Destro versus Cobra Commander is discussed by Iraqi soldiers in the autobiography by veteran Matt Gallagher.
