= Storm Shadow (G.I. Joe) =

Fictional character from the G.I. Joe franchise

- G.I. Joe character
- Storm Shadow as a Cobra agent (Promotional artwork of 1st figure package, 2007)
- First appearance: 1984
- Voiced by: Keone Young (Sunbow); Ty Olsson (Spy Troops and Valor vs. Venom); Tom Wayland (Sigma 6); Eric Bauza (Resolute); Andrew Kishino (Renegades); Sean Crisden (G.I. Joe: Operation Blackout); Jonathon Ha (Smite)

In-universe information
- Affiliation: Cobra
- Specialty: Ninja
- File name: Arashikage, Thomas (Tommy) S.
- Birth place: Fresno, California
- Primary MOS: Assassin; Sabotage
- Secondary MOS: Intelligence
- Subgroups: Cobra Urban Strike; Cobra Ninja Strike Force

Storm Shadow
- G.I. Joe character
- First appearance: 1988
- Voiced by: Scott McNeil (DiC)

In-universe information
- Affiliation: G.I. Joe
- Specialty: Ninja
- File name: Arashikage, Thomas (Tommy) S.
- Birth place: San Francisco, California
- Primary MOS: Covert operations
- Secondary MOS: Martial arts instructor
- Subgroups: Ninja Force; Shadow Ninjas

Storm Shadow is a fictional character from the G.I. Joe: A Real American Hero toyline, comic books and animated series. He is best known as the Cobra Commander's ninja bodyguard, and for his history with fellow ninja/blood brother Snake Eyes. Throughout his history, he has changed sides several times; conflicted in loyalties between Cobra (who he joined in order to find out who killed the Arashikage leader Hard Master) and the G.I. Joe Team (where he has established the Ninja Force group).

Storm Shadow is one of the most prominent characters in the G.I. Joe: A Real American Hero franchise, and has appeared in every series since its inception. He is portrayed by South Korean actor Lee Byung-hun in the 2009 live-action film G.I. Joe: The Rise of Cobra, and its 2013 sequel G.I. Joe: Retaliation, while British actor Andrew Koji portrayed him in the 2021 film Snake Eyes.

== Profile ==
In his original A Real American Hero incarnation, Storm Shadow's real name is Thomas "Tommy" S. Arashikage (トーマス・嵐影) (Arashi meaning "Storm" and kage meaning "shadow" in Japanese), a Japanese American. Storm Shadow served in a U.S. Army special operations long-range reconnaissance unit in Vietnam along with Snake Eyes and Stalker. He later invited Snake Eyes to train as a ninja with his family in Japan. The duo have been everything to one another from the bitterest of enemies to the most loyal of friends who would fight and die for one another.

Storm Shadow can trace his family history through thirty generations of assassins. He is an 8th degree black belt in several martial arts including Karate, Judo, Jujutsu, Taekwondo, Ninjutsu, Kobudo, Taekkyon, and many others. He can endure unimaginable amounts of hardship and pain. Storm Shadow moves with blinding speed, can scale sheer walls with bare hands and feet, and is an expert with a long bow, katana, shuriken, sai (weapon) and nunchaku. He usually wears a white uniform and mask. When out of his uniform, he is shown to be Japanese with black hair and dark eyes.

In 2007, the character's creator, Larry Hama, revealed an alternate name for the character, Tomisaburo Arashikage (嵐影富三郎), in the solo series Storm Shadow. His tattoo is a hexagram of the I Ching named 既濟 (jì jì), or "Already Fording".

Storm Shadow was only listed with a rank while a member of the Joe team. There are four instances where his file card provides a pay-grade: 1991, 1994, and 1997 releases all have him listed as a Master Sergeant or E-8 (the same rank as Duke), and in the 2007, 25th anniversary release, the file card lists him as E-5.

== Toys ==
Storm Shadow is one of the few characters from the "G.I. Joe: A Real American Hero" line that has been released as both a member of Cobra and a member of G.I. Joe. He first appeared in 1984 as a member of Cobra, but with his second figure released in 1988, he had defected to being a member of G.I. Joe. A new version of Storm Shadow was released as part of the Ninja Force line in 1992. The figure was repainted and released as part of the "Shadow Ninjas" line in 1994.

His loyalties remained with G.I. Joe until in 2000 his figure was released again as a Cobra agent. Since then, he has remained a member of Cobra. He is most often paired with his sword brother Snake Eyes in multi or comic packs. He has been released two times unmasked as Tommy Arashikage (once as a mail-away figure and once in a comic pack).

=== 25th Anniversary ===
The year 2007 was the 25th anniversary of the launch of G.I. Joe: A Real American Hero, the third major reinvention of the G.I. Joe brand since 1964. To celebrate, Hasbro created two boxed sets of brand new figures, featuring modern sculpts with updated articulation (including the replacement of G.I. Joe's trademark O-ring construction). Storm Shadow contained some new, more intricate details that the original character didn't have. He was included in the Cobra set, along with Cobra Commander, Destro, Baroness, and a Cobra Trooper. He was also included in a two-pack consisting of Storm Shadow and Snake Eyes in their original costumes, and a reissued G.I. Joe #21 comic book, Storm Shadow's first appearance in the series. He was also included in the first wave of single pack figures in his 1988 G.I. Joe urban-camouflage ninja uniform, but still contained slight differences from the 1988 character outfit, since Hasbro decided to reuse most of the tooling of the first figure; hence, he didn't have long sleeves, the placement of his arm tattoo had been moved, and he was missing the recurve bow and the calves garments (the latter of which were actually included on a Cobra-aligned figure featured in a comic pack with Firefly, along with a black backpack based on the 1988 figure's red backpack). A modified version of his 2007 figure appeared in the 2009 Hall of Heroes sub-line, as well as a new Cobra box set, featuring the sleeveless version of his original outfit as it appeared in the original comics and cartoons.

=== Movie tie-ins and 50th Anniversary ===
As a featured character in the live-action movie franchise, Storm Shadow received several figures in the respective movie-based toy lines based on his appearances in the films. In addition, as part of the G.I. Joe: Retaliation toyline in 2013, he received an "Ultimate" edition figure based on his original Cobra costume (without sleeves), featuring an additional unmasked head and numerous accessories, including a jet pack with colors and markings based on the Cobra C.L.A.W. jet glider. A budget-line figure exclusive to discount retailers was released in 2012, based on his Ninja Force costume. As part of the 50th anniversary celebration of the G.I. Joe franchise, Storm Shadow received one more release based upon his G.I. Joe urban camo outfit (although his file card and figure stand aligned him with Cobra) in a two-pack with Spirit Iron-Knife in 2015. This figure more accurately replicated the 1988 figure than the 2007 release, and used the backpack and swords from the Firefly comic-pack release, with the backpack colored red like the 1988 toy.

== Comics ==
=== Marvel Comics ===
Storm Shadow first appeared in Marvel's G.I. Joe: A Real American Hero #21 (March 1984), and was created by Larry Hama. Storm Shadow served in Southeast Asia on the same Long Range Reconnaissance Patrol team as future Joes Stalker and Snake Eyes. The intense nature of this service together forged a strong friendship between him and Snake Eyes. After Vietnam, Storm Shadow visited his family in Japan. His family, the Arashikage Clan, had actually been a fierce ninja clan, but for many centuries had remained clandestine. Hoping to learn the ways of the ninja, Storm Shadow studied under the tutelage of his estranged uncle, the Hard Master. When Snake Eyes arrived in Japan following the death of his entire family in a horrific automobile crash, he was invited to study with the clan. He quickly began to surpass Storm Shadow's abilities and was the Hard Master's choice to succeed him as the head of the clan. This caused a rift between the two friends, and Snake Eyes decided that he would leave the clan. However, before he could, an assassin killed the Hard Master while he was demonstrating a ninja technique to Snake Eyes. Due to no one else seeing the assassin, his immediate departure (chasing the assassin who fled in a mini-helicopter belonging to Cobra), that the killer appeared to use a ninja technique that Storm Shadow was a master of, and that the arrow that killed the Hard Master was one of Storm Shadow's personal arrows, Snake Eyes, the Soft Master, and the remaining clan members thought that Storm Shadow was to blame for the murder. Later, it was revealed that Zartan was the assassin. He had used technology to replicate Storm Shadow's "ear that sees" blind aiming technique. His intended target was Snake Eyes, a revenge killing ordered by Cobra Commander, but the Hard Master had been imitating Snake Eyes's heartbeat and Zartan shot the wrong target. The arrow was genuinely Storm Shadow's, Zartan had recovered it from outside the Arashikage compound after Storm Shadow had callously showed-off and used the "ear that sees" technique to kill a squirrel by shooting through a wall.

Years passed and Storm Shadow eventually was led to the international terrorist organization Cobra. He was quickly made Cobra Commander's bodyguard and soon thereafter encountered his old friends, Stalker and Snake Eyes, as members of the American strike team, G.I. Joe, designed to destroy Cobra. Storm Shadow befriends the son of Cobra Commander, a teenager named Billy. Eventually the two escape together. After several battles with the Joes, Storm Shadow and Snake Eyes would work together to bring down the men responsible for the death of the Hard Master (Zartan, Cobra Commander, and Firefly). During their first attempt, while trying to flee Cobra Island, Storm Shadow was shot by the Baroness and believed to be dead. He was revived during Doctor Mindbender's creation of Serpentor. Finally, Storm Shadow was made an official member of the G.I. Joe team and regained his honor through countless acts of courage. He would later return to Cobra after being captured and brainwashed along with several other former Cobra agents. He was frequently given continuous sessions of brainwashing to ensure his loyalty, and it took him a few years to finally shake off the programming and rejoin his sword brother, Snake Eyes. Storm Shadow participates in training the Joe's official Ninja Force. He relates to the students how he was unable to master a specific skill until he attempted to teach it; this allowed him to view the skill from different angles and ultimately master it. In the next issue, Storm Shadow and the Ninja Force encounter an attack from the Cobra allied mercenary force called the 'Night Creepers'.

=== Devil's Due Publishing ===
==== America's Elite ====
When the G.I. Joe team is reactivated in Devil's Due Publishing's G.I. Joe: America's Elite, Storm Shadow is added to the team due to his expertise as a covert ops specialist and ninja. However, what proves more important to the team, is the knowledge he gained as Cobra Commander's bodyguard. While Snake Eyes and Stalker accept him as a member, fellow team member Shipwreck is the most vocal about his suspicions, considering the ninja's constantly changing loyalties. Storm Shadow is the first to learn of the Baroness being alive and being held in the basement of the new G.I. Joe command center, "The Rock". After Snake Eyes' death aboard Destro's sub, Storm Shadow assists the team in search of the body, and encounters Major Bludd in Australia. He finds the Red Ninja clan had raised Snake Eyes from the dead, and had used some of their ancient techniques to place Sei-Ten in the body of T'jbang. After stopping Snake Eyes by placing Scarlett's life in danger, Storm Shadow temporarily leaves the team to assist the Red Ninjas in rebuilding and reviving their leader to set things right. Storm Shadow returns to stop Cobra from liberating prisoners from the G.I. Joe prison facility "The Coffin", assisted by a mole within Cobra. He is partially successful, but Tomax manages to free Major Bludd and several others, while killing those Cobra Commander considered "loose ends". Storm Shadow then tracks down Destro and the Baroness, so that they can help disable Cobra's M.A.R.S. tech devices. They join the rest of the main team, in defeating several Cobra cells, and disarming nuclear weapons that Cobra Commander has placed in the Amazon and Antarctica.

The seven-issue solo series Storm Shadow, written by the original writer Larry Hama, follows Storm Shadow after leaving the G.I. Joe team.

=== G.I. Joe: Reloaded ===
In the alternate continuity series G.I. Joe: Reloaded, Storm Shadow is similar to his original continuity counterpart in his Cobra roots, as he serves as Cobra Commander's assassin/bodyguard. He does not wear a mask, and instead, is seen wearing a much different white uniform with a long jacket. He does face off with Snake Eyes, who in this series is his half-brother, and comments on Snake Eyes' traitorous nature. This series ended without fully exploring their relationship.

== Animated series ==
=== Sunbow ===
Unlike the comic, the Sunbow animated series never explored the relationship between Snake Eyes and Storm Shadow. He first appeared in the miniseries "The Revenge of Cobra", in which he fights G.I. Joe member Spirit for one of three fragments of the Weather Dominator. He lets Spirit keep the fragment for saving him from drowning, but later steals it from G.I. Joe headquarters after Zartan captures the third component and offers it to the highest bidder. In this series, Storm Shadow was often depicted as a counterpart to Spirit, and later on against G.I. Joe member Quick Kick. In the episode "Excalibur", he crashes into a lake during an aerial battle and finds King Arthur's sword, stealing it from the Lady of the Lake. This causes a thunderstorm that only stops when Excalibur is returned. Also in that episode, Storm Shadow encounters Quick Kick twice, breaking his leg on both occasions.

Storm Shadow remained loyal to Cobra until the end of the Sunbow series. In season two, he sided with Cobra Commander against Serpentor, and was seen helping the Commander in several of his plots to overthrow Serpentor.

=== G.I. Joe: The Movie ===
In G.I. Joe: The Movie, Storm Shadow is seen in two frames when Serpentor yells at all the Cobra characters in the beginning.

=== DiC ===
Storm Shadow returns in the DiC-produced G.I. Joe series, but this time on the side of the Joe team and as a member of the Ninja Force, reflecting his status in both the toy-line and the comics at that time. He came to side with the Joes because the initial cartoon's storyline ended after G.I. Joe: The Movie and so the comic dictated the path of the toys. Had the series continued with a third season, Storm Shadow would still have been a Cobra. Cobra Commander makes several comments in the episode Shadow of a Doubt about Storm Shadow being a traitor. Storm Shadow claims that he only joined Cobra to find out who had dishonored his ninja clan. Aside from that, he is given little backstory in the animated series. The relationship between Snake Eyes and Storm Shadow is best showcased in the Season 2 episode, The Sword, when it is shown that they both respect each other's ninja skills and abilities. Storm Shadow was voiced by Scott McNeil.

=== Sigma 6 ===
In G.I. Joe: Sigma 6, Storm Shadow is Cobra's ninja master. He began his career in mainstream U.S. intelligence agencies. Early on, he went undercover within the Cobra organization and was brainwashed by the enemy. Through powerful mind tricks, they convinced him that the groups he had worked for were actually traitors, and that Cobra forces were the good guys trying to stop them. He is a formidable ninja who has adapted his martial arts skills to serve his own nefarious purposes. As a covert operations counterintelligence expert, he once conducted undercover sabotage missions. Now, as a member of Cobra, he uses this knowledge against the Sigma 6 team, relentlessly working to destroy them and anyone else who stands in his way.

In the animated series, Storm Shadow is voiced by Tom Wayland. The rivalry between Storm Shadow and Snake Eyes is one of the focal plot lines of the series. There have been hints and references as to the cause of their enmity. The 4Kids TV website for Sigma 6 states that Storm Shadow was on an infiltration mission in a Cobra base and was captured and brainwashed into thinking the Joes and Snake Eyes were his enemies. Although Storm Shadow called Snake Eyes "brother," the exact nature of that relationship is unknown, aside from the fact that they were trained by their master together. Storm Shadow frequently blames Snake Eyes for the downfall of the Arashikage ninja clan. However, the exact nature of Snake Eyes's betrayal of the Arashikage, if any, is as yet unknown. On occasion, he used ninja B.A.T.s as support troopers. This is in contrast to the A Real American Hero series, wherein Storm Shadow preferred highly trained humans as opposed to machines.

Devil's Due also created a miniseries based on Sigma 6. It follows the style and the content of the animated series, spotlighting a different member of Sigma 6 and Cobra in each issue.

=== G.I. Joe: Resolute ===
In the G.I. Joe: Resolute miniseries, Storm Shadow's past is revealed as his rivalry with Snake Eyes being the result of Storm Shadow fearing his uncle would teach the seventh move of the "Seven Steps to the Sun" to Snake Eyes instead of him because of his bloodlust, and then hiring Zartan to take out their master. By present time, during the attack of the U.S.S. Flagg, Storm Shadow murders Bazooka and places a scroll marked with the Arashikage symbol that issues to Snake Eyes a final duel at their former dojo. Revealing his true reasons for hating Snake Eyes, Storm Shadow pins him down using the sixth move. However, Snake Eyes's counters reveal he, in fact, had learned the final move from their master prior to his death, using it to kill Storm Shadow. However, in the DVD release of the film, the grave that Snake Eyes buried Storm Shadow in is shown to be empty and Storm Shadow is presumably still alive. Storm Shadow was voiced by Eric Bauza.

=== G.I. Joe: Renegades ===
In the animated series G.I. Joe: Renegades, Storm Shadow is voiced by Andrew Kishino. Born Tomisaburo Arashikage, he is the cousin of Kimi Arashikage (Jinx) and nephew of the Hard Master, head of the Arashikage clan of ninja. He once trained with Snake Eyes and has had a bitter rivalry with him. The rivalry reached its zenith when Tomisaburo slipped poison in the tea cup meant for Snake Eyes as he was to talk to the Hard Master. However, without the youth's knowledge, the cups were accidentally switched and the Hard Master drank the poisoned tea. Mistaking Snake Eyes' attempt to save his uncle (via an emergency tracheotomy) as an act of cold-blooded murder, scarring him while driving him off, Tomisaburo vowed revenge while becoming acting leader of the Arashikage. Storm Shadow pursued Snake Eyes to his hidden dojo in the mountains, telling Kimi of how her father died and convincing her to reclaim her birthright. During the events of "Homecoming", Storm Shadow fought Snake Eyes on board a military train and assisted the Baroness, later infiltrating Cobra Industries and proposes an allegiance with her. Later, in "White Out," Storm Shadow receives the Shadow Vipers from Doctor Mindbender and pursues the Joes to Canada, where he barely managed to survive being caught in an avalanche. In "Cutting Edge," Baroness calls on Storm Shadow when a high-tech ninja is targeting Cobra Commander. Storm Shadow ends up discovering that the assassin to be Jinx, who revealed (as explained to her by Scarlett) that Snake Eyes's action against the Hard Master was actually an attempt to save him from the poison inflicting him. Hearing it, Storm Shadow leaves and later returns to help Jinx and Snake Eyes destroy a cadre of B.A.T.s. Once the fight resolved, Storm Shadow admitted to his murder attempt on Snake Eyes and how the Hard Master died as a result. Believing himself to be beyond redemption for unknowingly killing the Hard Master, Storm Shadow takes his leave.

== Film ==
=== Direct-to-video films ===
Storm Shadow appeared in the direct-to-video CGI animated movies G.I. Joe: Spy Troops and G.I. Joe: Valor vs. Venom, voiced by Ty Olsson. These two movies seem to ignore the previous continuity, and deal more with the continuity of the toys and cartoon at that time. Storm Shadow is again a Cobra ninja as in previous Sunbow cartoons; however, unlike previous times, he now faces Snake Eyes.

In the animated short G.I. Joe: Ninja Battles, a new ninja Tiger Claw is joining G.I. Joe, and learns of Snake Eyes and Storm Shadow's past in the Arashikage clan. The rivalry between the two ninjas is explained to some degree, and it shows how they have dealt with each other to this day. Most of the movie is narration over original artwork, and some scenes from the previous movies, as well as some new footage at the end.

=== The Rise of Cobra ===
Storm Shadow
- G.I. Joe character
- First appearance: 2009-2021
- Portrayed by: Lee Byung-hun (adult); Brandon Soo Hoo (child, Rise of Cobra); Nathan Takashige (child, Retaliation); Andrew Koji (adult)
- Voiced by: Tim Joe (video game)

In-universe information
- Affiliation: Cobra
- Specialty: Martial arts specialist
- File name: Thomas "Tommy" Arashikage
- SN: Classified
- Rank: Classified
- Series: G.I. Joe: The Rise of Cobra; G.I. Joe: Retaliation; Snake Eyes

In the 2009 film, G.I. Joe: The Rise of Cobra, the young Storm Shadow is played by Brandon Soo Hoo and the adult by Lee Byung-hun. In this film adaptation, Storm Shadow is portrayed as a Korean ninja who was trained in Japan. The young Storm Shadow is seen speaking in Korean while training in Tokyo.

Storm Shadow has a long history with Snake Eyes going back to when they were children, when he caught a starving Snake Eyes attempting to steal food. However, much to Storm Shadow's chagrin, Snake Eyes is immediately welcomed into the dojo. While Storm Shadow is initially superior, Snake Eyes persists and eventually earns the favor of the Hard Master. Shortly after, Snake Eyes is proclaimed the best student, and it is made to appear that Storm Shadow murdered the master and fled the scene. This turns their rivalry into bitter hatred as they find themselves on opposing sides. Similar to his continuity counterparts in background and attire, Storm Shadow serves as McCullen's assassin and as both bodyguard and mentor to the Baroness. Sent by McCullen to support the Baroness in acquiring the nanomite warheads, Storm Shadow was also given a direct order to kill Baron Daniel DeCobray if he ever touched the Baroness again, with her intentionally giving him reason as DeCobray outlived his usefulness to them. In another instance, however, Zartan mocks Storm Shadow for his unwillingness to kill women. During a lengthy fight in Cobra's arctic base, Snake Eyes slashes Storm Shadow several times, eventually compelling the latter to remove his white uniform. At the end, he is stabbed by Snake Eyes and falls into icy water.

In Operation HISS, a comic sequel to the film, Storm Shadow survived his apparent death in the film. Lee Byung-hun stated in an interview that he is signed on to return to future sequels, and reprised his role in the film G.I. Joe: Retaliation. Disguised as Snake Eyes, Storm Shadow has assassinated the president of Pakistan, and breaks Cobra Commander out of prison with help from Firefly. He is injured in an explosion, and retreats to a temple in the Himalayas to recover. When the Blind Master learns he is alive, Storm Shadow is captured and brought to the master in Japan by Snake Eyes and Jinx to answer the Hard Master's murder. He then reveals that he was framed for the murder of the Hard Master by Zartan, the real murderer, who proceeded to raise Storm Shadow to be a ruthless assassin, and that he joined Cobra to avenge his uncle's death. To prove his innocence, Storm Shadow also fights Snake Eyes with the sword that killed the Hard Master, which breaks (Arashikage steel does not break). Eventually, Storm Shadow betrays Cobra and joins forces with the Joes in their fight, killing Zartan in the process. After their victory, he says goodbye to Snake Eyes and Jinx and leaves.

=== Snake Eyes ===
Storm Shadow appears in Snake Eyes with Andrew Koji portraying the character. The film is set in an alternate continuity, but like every other continuity, the character is a member of the Arashikage Clan. Tomisaburo "Tommy" Arashikage and his cousin Kenta were both in line to become leader of the clan. Since there could only be one, Kenta tried to have Tommy killed, and as a consequence, was banished from the clan. In the present, Kenta, now a member of Cobra and yakuza boss, orders his recruit Snake Eyes to kill Tommy, but Snake Eyes helps Tommy escape instead. In return, Tommy takes Snake Eyes to Tokyo, and offers him to join the Arashikage Clan. Tommy also gives Snake Eyes a katana known as the "Morning Light", and tells him about the Jewel of the Sun, an ancient artifact of destructive power that the clan has sworn to protect and not use. It is later revealed that Snake Eyes has been working as a spy for Kenta when he steals the Jewel for him. An enraged Tommy fights Snake Eyes, but Snake Eyes, who has realized his mistake, convinces Tommy that they need to stop Kenta, which they succeed in doing. However, Tommy uses the Jewel against Kenta, for which he is determined unfit to lead the Arashikage clan. Tommy forsakes the clan, and vows to kill Snake Eyes if they ever meet again. In a mid-credits scene, Tommy is recruited into Cobra by the Baroness, and renames himself "Storm Shadow".

== Video games ==
Storm Shadow is one of the featured villains in the 1985 game G.I. Joe: A Real American Hero. Storm Shadow is featured as a playable character in the 1992 game G.I. Joe: The Atlantis Factor. In the 2009 game G.I. Joe: The Rise of Cobra, he is a mini-boss, who is fought once in each of the first three acts.

== Reception ==
Topless Robot ranked Storm Shadow as second on the 2010 list of The 10 Coolest G.I. Joe Ninjas, adding that he "been voted the #1 Cobra villain by the old Action Force Weekly". His likeness is also featured in League of Legends, where the yordle ninja character named Kennen can be given the Arctic Ops skin, displaying the camo pattern worn by the 1988 Storm Shadow, as well as the character Zed who has a skin that appears similar to his appearance.
