= Sgt. Savage and his Screaming Eagles =

G.I. Joe toy line

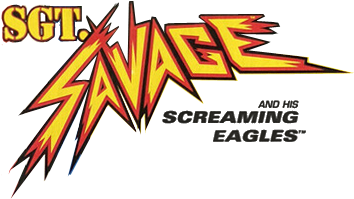
- Type: Action figures, mini-comics
- Invented by: Hasbro; Joe Kubert
- Company: Hasbro
- Country: United States
- Availability: 1994–95
- Materials: Plastic
- Features: Military
- Slogan: From out of the past, to save the day!

Sgt. Savage and his Screaming Eagles is a line of military-themed toys produced by Hasbro that was sold between 1994 and 1995. It was intended to be a companion line to G.I. Joe: A Real American Hero. Comic book artist Joe Kubert provided the packaging artwork for the toys and also drew the mini-comics included with certain figures. The line was short-lived due to the cancellation of the entire A Real American Hero line in favor of the Kenner-produced G.I. Joe Extreme series.

The main character is an imposing "hard charger from the greatest generation" as depicted in his various filecards. Survivor of Omaha Beach and an infantry commander renowned for his skill, who after being frozen for over 50 years is resurrected and found out that he was subject of experiments made by the enemy. Now in the present, he possesses incredible levels of physical strength and enhanced reflexes. Devoted to destroying a "recently created" enemy team for the series called I.R.O.N. Army and its leader, General Blitz, Savage now joins forces with the G.I. Joe Team.

== Toyline ==
The Screaming Eagles figures differ significantly from their standard A Real American Hero counterparts due to the way Hasbro eliminated the O-ring hip system that allowed a figure to sustain the legs and provided the figure's hip articulation point, replacing it with a simpler vessel for a twist peg inside the legs' frame. The height for the figures was also changed from the standard 3.75" to 4.5".

The first wave of carded figures were numbered from 1 through 6. The numbering was abandoned for the second wave, which consisted entirely of repaints. The second wave of figures each included a secret coded message inside the figure card, which required a decoder ring that came packaged with one of the figures. Three vehicles were also produced, along with two small playsets.

=== Carded figures ===
- Wave 1
  - Commando Sgt. Savage (includes "Old Soldiers Never Die" VHS tape)
  - Combat Sgt. Savage
  - D-Day
  - Dynamite
  - General Blitz
  - I.R.O.N. Stormtrooper
- Wave 2
  - Cryo-Freeze Sgt. Savage
  - Urban Attack Dynamite (includes decoder ring)
  - Arctic Stormtrooper
  - Jungle Camo D-Day
  - Jet Pack General Blitz
- Mail-in
  - Desert-Camo Savage (also released as a G.I. Joe Collector's Club exclusive)

=== Vehicles and playsets ===
- P-40 Warhawk with Fighter Pilot Sgt. Savage figure
- Grizzly SS-1
- I.R.O.N. Panther with I.R.O.N. Anvil figure
- Battle Bunker with Battle Command Sgt. Savage (includes "Sgt. Savage vs. Gen. Blitz Part 1" mini-comic)
- Enemy Battle Bunker with Cyborg General Blitz (includes "Sgt. Savage vs. Gen. Blitz Part 2" mini-comic)

=== Hall of Fame ===
A 12-inch Sgt. Savage action figure, marketed as Total Combat Sgt. Savage, was also sold as part of the G.I. Joe: Hall of Fame sub-line. The figure came with a combat rifle with motorized recoil and other accessories.

== Cartoon ==
A pilot episode for a Sgt. Savage and his Screaming Eagles animated series was produced by Sunbow Productions and Graz Entertainment and written by Lloyd Goldfine. The episode never aired on TV, but was released on a VHS tape included with the Commando Sgt. Savage action figure. A few characters from the A Real American Hero TV series appeared in the pilot to tie the two series together. While the onscreen title was "Old Heroes Never Die", the packaging gave the title as "Old Soldiers Never Die".

=== Plot ===
The episode starts with a newsreel from the 1940s detailing how Sgt. Savage, a war hero awarded with the Medal of Honor in the World War II European theater, dies along with his entire company in a failed raid against a German scientific facility. Later, such place is discovered by a news team in the middle 1990s, it turns out that Savage survived. His frozen body is discovered, and is given to the Joes for further research. A robotic trooper invades the Joes' scientific facility, but Savage awakens in the nick of time to destroy it.

According to Savage, the raid where all his company died was spoiled by a traitor amongst his ranks. Later, a scientist called Dr. Garret Stromm announces to the Joes that a new super advanced space platform is about to be deployed. Savage identifies the scientist as Lt. Garrison Kreiger, the traitor himself. Savage also learns that during World War II he was Kreiger's guinea pig in genetic experiments and now he possesses super strength and increased reflexes, these "powers", as his whole physical condition wanes from time to time. Savage is then introduced to his new team, a squad of 6 experts in different scientific fields, all well seasoned sergeants, but unable to follow direct orders, after a brief skirmish, Savage takes control of them, now calling themselves the "Screaming Eagles".

Kreiger is later seen communicating to Cobra Commander that the ties between their two organizations no longer bind, how he helped the Cobra Command formation and how he will destroy them if he interferes with his plans. At the same time, the Eagles are checking the invading robot's remains, and they realize that the space platform Kreiger, who now calls himself "General Blitz" helped to build is really a Doomsday device meant to control every computer system on the planet (aiming mainly at the Strategic Defense Initiative), so Savage and his team go forth to stop Blitz, his plans, and his new, completely robotic I.R.O.N. Troopers.

=== Characters ===
Screaming Eagles
A team of six well seasoned sergeants and specialists on every technology and military field led by Sgt. Savage. Due to the short retail life of the toyline, D-Day and Dynamite were the only characters besides Savage himself who were actually released as figures; the rest of the team ended up being featured solely in the animated pilot. The real names and backstories of all the Screaming Eagles members would be established years later in the 2009 book G.I. Joe vs. Cobra: The Essential Guide published by Random House.

- Sgt. Savage (voiced by Scott McNeil): Master Sergeant Robert Steven Savage, a decorated World War II veteran who was captured by the Iron Army and used as a test subject for genetic experimentation to create the ultimate soldier. He was kept frozen in a cryogenic sleep chamber. Sgt. Savage would be the only character to be carried over to the succeeding G.I. Joe Extreme toyline.
- D-Day (voiced by Brent Chapman): David X. Brewi, a former Golden Gloves champion and the heavy weapons specialist.
- Dynamite (voiced by Scott McNeil): Hector J. Garrido, an Argentinian chemist with "love for explosives", demolitions expert.
- Grill (voiced by Julian Christopher): Darren K. Filbert, a genius in mechanics, creator of all the Eagles' arsenal and vehicles.
- Head Banger (voiced by Garry Chalk): Kevin M. Kaye, a "Heavy rocker" with a knack for communications systems.
- Mouse (voiced by Michael Donovan): Morris L. Sanderson, a clumsy mountain of a man, and the team's head hacker.
- Tank (voiced by Robert O. Smith): Dwight M. Prudence, the vehicles' master operator.

The I.R.O.N. Army
A shadowy cabal of elite enemy cyber-soldiers from World War II. The organization's name is an acronym for "International Robotic Operations Network".

- General Blitz (voiced by Garry Chalk): Garrison Kreiger, a World War II American 2nd lieutenant who was part of Sgt. Savage's platoon while secretly working for the I.R.O.N. Army. During the present day he poses as Dr. Garret Stromm, a scientist who leads Iron Arms Industries, a seemingly legitimate company in charge of developing the International Orbital Space Program, but this is actually a front for his organization. It is implied that he had a hand in the creation of Cobra Command.
- I.R.O.N. Stormtroopers: An army of cyber soldiers created by Kreiger during World War II as a "new master race" for world domination.

Guest characters

- Hawk (voiced by David Kaye)
- Lady Jaye (voiced by Kathleen Barr)
- Doc (voiced by Julian Christopher)
- Cobra Commander (voiced by Scott McNeil)
