= Rip Cord (G.I. Joe) =

- G.I. Joe character
- Illustration of Rip Cord from G.I. Joe: Order of Battle. Art by Herb Trimpe.
- First appearance: 1984
- Voiced by: Gregg Berger (Sunbow); Steven Blum (Resolute); Khary Payton (Renegades)

In-universe information
- Affiliation: G.I. Joe
- Specialty: HALO (High Altitude Low Opening) Jumper
- File name: Wallace A. Weems
- Birth place: Columbus, Ohio
- SN: RA 148-23-1056
- Rank: E-4 (Corporal)
- Primary MOS: Airborne Infantry
- Secondary MOS: Demolitions

Rip Cord (also known as Ripcord) is a fictional character from the G.I. Joe: A Real American Hero toyline, comic books, and animated series. He is the G.I. Joe Team's HALO (High Altitude Low Opening) Jumper and debuted in 1984.

Comedian actor Marlon Wayans portrayed Rip Cord in the 2009 film, G.I. Joe: The Rise of Cobra.

== Profile ==
His real name is Wallace A. Weems, and his rank is that of Corporal E-4. Rip Cord was born in Columbus, Ohio.

His primary military specialty is airborne infantry and his secondary military specialty is demolitions. He joined the Civil Air Patrol while he was still in high school and after taking up an interest in skydiving he joined the G.I. Joe team, seeking the opportunity to jump from considerably higher altitudes. He is a qualified expert with the M-16, M1911A1 Auto Pistol, Carl Gustav 9mm parabellum, and the Browning high-power.

His action figure in 1984 included an FN FAL rifle although it is never mentioned in his bio as a weapon that he is proficient in.

In the UK Action Force series, Rip Cord is from Manchester in England, and is an ex-member of the Parachute Regiment freefall team, the Red Devils.

== Toys ==
Rip Cord was first released as an action figure in 1984.

== Comics ==
=== Marvel Comics ===
In the Marvel Comics G.I. Joe series, he first appears in issue #32. Ripcord develops a relationship with a civilian named Candy Appel, who worked freelance as "Bongo the Bear" performing at birthday parties and similar events. Their relationship is marred by Ripcord being unable to tell Candy his real name, or clearly explain why they draw the attention of Cobra forces.

Ripcord is sent with Stalker, Recondo and other Joes to rescue the peace activist Adele Burkhardt from the war-torn fictional country of Sierra Gordo. Ripcord expresses displeasure they are fighting for a woman who opposes the military. Stalker berates him, informing him that unpopular opinions are just as valid. Burkhardt is safely rescued, but not without the loss of three Tucaro soldiers who volunteered to assist.

After Ripcord and Candy call it quits, it is discovered that Candy is the daughter of a Cobra Crimson Guardsman. Candy is taken into custody, but vanishes due to interference by the Cobra agent Buzzer. This sets Ripcord out on a mission to Cobra Island, to find her and clear her name, unaware that Candy has been killed during a coincidental visit to Springfield, the headquarters of Cobra. He tricks Ace during an overflight into activating his helmet, which allows Ripcord to parachute out, an act unofficially approved by General Hawk. Ripcord battles Zartan, in an isolated section of Cobra Island. Both wound each other, but Zartan subdues Ripcord and switches identities with him. Zartan (as Ripcord) is rescued by G.I. Joe, while Ripcord (as Zartan) is taken into Cobra headquarters. Ripcord's physical differences from Zartan are accepted, because the Cobra agent is a master of disguise.

Ripcord eventually ends up at the main center for Cobra, the city of Springfield. After giving Joes the location of Springfield, he makes an escape attempt, but is captured by a loyal Cobra child. Ripcord's information allows G.I. Joe to raid Springfield. They safely rescue him, but not before he undergoes torture in the "Brain Wave Scanner", a device that was being used to feed information into the form of Serpentor.

After this incident, Ripcord takes time off from active-duty. He returns in time for the opening of The Pit III. He is later part of the G.I. Joe forces deployed to back Serpentor in the Cobra Civil War.

=== Devil's Due ===
Ripcord is an active Joe in the Devil's Due company's continuation of the series. He is active in attempting to neutralize the threat of Tyler Wingfield, who runs a technologically advanced militia.

Ripcord is part of Hawk's team when the Joes invade Cobra Island and engage in battle with Cobra and Serpentor's forces.

Ripcord returns to Sierra Gordo and again works with Recondo. Along with the Joes Dart, Tunnel Rat and Low-Light they investigate an invading army from a neighboring country. They work with local resistance to kill many of these soldiers; it degenerates to hand-to-hand combat and Low-Light and Tunnel Rat are severely injured. It turns out it was all a 'scam' by Destro and his Iron Grenadiers to set one country against another for profit. Duke forces Destro to call this off; Ripcord realizes something stinks about the whole situation. On returning to the PITT, he confronts Duke about his actions, indicating he's unhappy with how Duke has changed.

=== IDW ===
Ripcord is introduced in G.I. Joe Origins #13, shown as being a young African American, who hates his code name, and wishes to stop jumping out of planes and become a pilot one day. In a differing continuity, Ripcord and Crankcase are part of a small team of Joes hiding in the seemingly abandoned Cobra stronghold of Springfield. A Battle Android Trooper attacks, killing Crankcase and severely injuring Ripcord.

== Animated series ==
=== Sunbow ===
Rip Cord appeared in the original G.I. Joe animated series. He first appeared in the animated series in the "Revenge of Cobra" mini-series.

Rip Cord is also featured in one of the famous "And Knowing Is Half the Battle" Public Service Announcements where he instructs a young ballplayer to have his eyes checked after repeatedly striking out due to blurred vision saying that it is best to confront a problem head-on rather than avoid it.

=== Resolute ===
Ripcord appears in G.I. Joe: Resolute where he is an African American, he was along the joes present when looking at footage of the destruction of Moscow cause by Cobra's particle weapon. He, Duke, and Scarlett head to a missile facility control by Zartan in Sierra Gordo. Duke and Scarlett enter it and kill Zartan, then rescue the two before the facility blew up.

=== Renegades ===
Ripcord first appears in the G.I. Joe: Renegades episode "The Descent". Like the Resolute series, Ripcord is African American in this series. In this show, he was one of four rookies, along with Duke, Tunnel Rat, and Roadblock, chosen by Lady Jaye to investigate the Cobra Pharmaceutical Plant under the command of Scarlett. They discover Cobra's new top secret weapon, the Bio-Vipers, being created by Doctor Mindbender. He is supposedly killed in an explosion with Bio-Vipers who caught him during the escape from the secret lab after they set the bomb.

In the episode "Prodigal," the Joes - upon infiltrating a Cobra Medical Facility - discover that Ripcord is the "Patient X" that was used as a test subject for the creation of the Anaconda Strain virus. Following a brief amnesia, the Joes try to get Ripcord out of there, and work to help Ripcord regain his memories. Ripcord doesn't even know how he got out of the explosion. It was soon discovered that Ripcord had been converted into a Bio-Viper while evading a Cobra Drone in the Coyote. When the Cobra Drone was destroyed, Ripcord returned to normal. Scarlett spots a control chip in Ripcord's head and wonders what happened, as Scarlett plans to turn Ripcord over to General Abernathy. Flint, Lady Jaye, and Wild Bill arrive and are unaware of what happened to Ripcord. Just then some Cobra Drones arrive, causing the Joes to try to shoot them down. Cobra Commander then uses the control chip to turn Ripcord into a Bio-Viper, breaking free from Flint's chopper and knocking out Flint in the process. The Bio-Viper Ripcord then attacks Duke, who tries to get Ripcord to fight the control. Ripcord states that he can't control it and takes the blast from Flint's chopper. A flashback by Ripcord reveals that Doctor Mindbender used him as a test subject for a Bio-Viper/human hybrid in Cobra Commander's plans for immortality. Upon fighting the control chip, Ripcord rejoins the Joes. Cobra Commander then plans to have his men recover Ripcord alive and intact.

In the episode "The Anomaly", Ripcord is shown to also have developed an ability to detect other Bio-Vipers, when it came to a Sewer Viper in New York. When Doctor Mindbender used his neuro-link helmet in another attempt to control Ripcord's Bio-Viper form, the Sewer Viper attacked, and Doctor Mindbender sicked the Ripcord/Bio-Viper on it. The Sewer Viper managed to remove the control chip from Ripcord, freeing him from Doctor Mindbender's control, with Ripcord being able to control the transformation and abilities at will. Though Ripcord destroyed the neuro-link helmet and vowed to make Doctor Mindbender pay for what he did to him, Duke intervened when the fail-safe in the Bio-Vipers started their self-destruction, upon the helmet being separated from Doctor Mindbender. When Ripcord wanted to sacrifice himself to prevent the explosion, the Sewer Viper ended up sacrificing its own life to prevent the explosion instead.

Rip Cord was also responsible for giving Scarlett, Tunnel Rat and Roadblock their code names.

== Live action film ==
Ripcord
- G.I. Joe character
- Marlon Wayans as Ripcord in G.I. Joe: The Rise of Cobra.
- First appearance: 2009
- Portrayed by: Marlon Wayans
- Voiced by: Ajani Perkins (video game)

In-universe information
- Affiliation: G.I. Joe
- Specialty: Airborne Infantry, Pilot
- File name: Wallace A. Weems
- SN: 845-99-WA76
- Rank: Master Sergeant (E-8)
- Series: G.I. Joe: The Rise of Cobra

Ripcord, his codename now changed to one word, appears in the 2009 film G.I. Joe: The Rise of Cobra played by Marlon Wayans. This version is changed significantly from his source material counterpart, including the way his codename is rendered. In the film, Ripcord is African American, a newcomer to G.I. Joe, and one of the film's major characters; the traditional Rip Cord, however, is Caucasian, a G.I. Joe veteran, and more of a background character.

In the film, he is Duke's best friend and partner, also attempting much of the comic relief. Before joining G.I. Joe, they were mid-level ground troops in the U.S. Army. Unlike Duke, Ripcord loves flying planes and wanted to join the U.S. Air Force before becoming a Joe. They join the team through a series of events caused by the treacherous actions of James McCullen. Their codenames, presumably earned in the Army, are carried over with them into G.I. Joe.

The team's commanding officer, General Hawk states that Ripcord's test scores are comparable to Duke's, if imperfect. Also, after completing a marksmanship test, Ripcord's score comes just short of matching the best on record: Scarlett's. Throughout the film, Ripcord tries to impress Scarlett, to whom he is openly attracted. Though she generally rebuffs his advances, they become close over the course of the film, and she kisses him by its completion.

Wayans tried out for the part of Heavy Duty before it went to Adewale Akinnuoye-Agbaje.

== Video games ==
Ripcord appears as a playable character in the video game G.I. Joe: The Rise of Cobra.
