= List of G.I. Joe: A Real American Hero action figures =

The following list (organized by faction) covers every known character in the G.I. Joe: A Real American Hero toy line to have received his/her own action figure. It includes the year the characters' version 1 action figure debuted, their code names and real names, function, and original rank/grade (if applicable). It does not include every edition of the character, or the code name and rank changes that occurred, and only covers the action figures' releases in North America.

Relating the characters to their appearances in the various comic book series, (vol. 1) refers to the original comics series published by Marvel Comics, SM for the G.I. Joe: Special Missions spin-off (also published by Marvel), (vol. 2) for the comics series by Devil's Due Publishing and FL for the G.I. Joe: Frontline spin-off. Although the majority of characters had action figures issued prior to their first appearance in the comic books, a few exceptions (such as the Oktober Guardsmen) exist where their comic book introduction predates their action figures. With IDW's revival of G.I. Joe: A Real American Hero, which picks up immediately following the final issue of the original Marvel Comics run at issue no. 155½, and the statement by Hasbro that "we are currently taking the brand in a direction that does not take the Devil’s Due story into account," the volume 2 stories (including characters killed in action (KIA)) have been rendered non-canon.

In 2007, Hasbro marked the 25th anniversary of the G.I. Joe: A Real American Hero toyline by introducing a collection of newly sculpted 100 mm figures (as opposed to the 3¾" scale of the RAH line). These figures replaced the classic O-ring construction with a swivel chest feature, and increased the number of points of articulation beyond the standard shoulder, elbow and knees, to swivel wrists, ankles, and double-hinged knees. Since then, new figures have continued to feature the updated articulation. Since 2011, all convention and collector's club exclusives have also used the updated figure style.

== G.I. Joe Team ==
=== A Real American Hero (1982–1994) ===
Year	Code Name	Function	Real Name	Grade	Service Branch	Sub-team	Notes
1982	Breaker	Communications Officer	Alvin R. Kibbey	E-4	Army		KIA (vol. 1) #109 – Died while escaping in a stolen Cobra Rage tank.
1982	Clutch	VAMP Driver	Lance J. Steinberg	E-4	Army	Mega Marines	Packaged with the "V.A.M.P." vehicle; also released as Double Clutch (2003)
1982	Flash	Laser Rifle Trooper	Anthony S. Gambello	E-4	Army		Disavowed Continuity: KIA (vol. 2) #25 – Died in an explosion during the second Cobra Civil War.
1982	Grand Slam	Laser Artillery Soldier	James J. Barney	E-5	Army		
1982	Grunt	Infantry Trooper	Robert W. Graves	E-4	Army		
1982	Hawk	Missile Commander	Clayton M. Abernathy	O-6	Army		Packaged with the Mobile Missile System (M.M.S.)
1982	Rock 'n Roll	Machine Gunner	Craig S. McConnel	E-5	Army		Also released as Bench Press (2009)
1982	Scarlett	Counterintelligence	Shana M. O'Hara	E-5	Army	Ninja Force	
1982	Short-Fuze	Mortar Soldier	Eric W. Friestadt	E-4	Army		
1982	Snake Eyes	Commando	(CLASSIFIED)	E-5	Army	Desert Patrol Squad, Ninja Force	Timber wolf included with Version 2 (1985) re-release.
1982	Stalker	Ranger	Lonzo R. Wilkinson	E-5	Army	Desert Patrol Squad, Tiger Force	
1982	Steeler	Tank Commander	Ralph W. Pulaski	O-1	Army		Packaged with the "M.O.B.A.T." tank. Cobra Double Agent, KIA
1982	Zap	Bazooka Soldier	Rafael J. Melendez	E-4	Army		
1983	Ace	Fighter Pilot	Brad J. Armbruster	O-3	Air Force		Packaged with the "Skystriker" fighter jet.
1983	Airborne	Helicopter Assault Trooper	Franklin E. Talltree	E-5	Army		Subsequently renamed Sgt. Airborne (2003) and Air Raid (2009)
1983	Cover Girl	Wolverine Driver	Courtney A. Krieger	E-4	Army		Packaged with the "Wolverine" Armored Missile Vehicle; also released as Agent Courtney Krieger (2006)
1983	Doc	Medic	Carl W. Greer	O-3	Army		KIA (vol. 1) #109 – Executed by a SAW Viper.
1983	Duke	First Sergeant	Conrad S. Hauser	E-8	Army	Anti-Venom Task Force, Star Brigade, Tiger Force	
1983	Gung-Ho	Marine	Ettienne R. LaFitte	E-7	Marine Corps	Desert Patrol Squad, Mega Marines	
1983	Snow Job	Arctic Trooper	Harlan W. Moore	E-6	Army		
1983	Torpedo	SEAL	Edward W. Leialoha	W-4	Navy		
1983	Tripwire	Mine Detector	Tormod S. Skoog	E-4 (Specialist)	Army	Tiger Force	
1983	Wild Bill	Helicopter Pilot	William S. Hardy	W-4	Army		Packaged with the "Dragonfly XH-1" helicopter.
1984	Blowtorch	Flamethrower	Timothy P. Hanrahan	E-4	Army		
1984	Cutter	Hovercraft Pilot	Skip A. Stone	O-2	Coast Guard	D.E.F.	Packaged with the "Killer W.H.A.L.E." hovercraft.
1984	Deep Six	S.H.A.R.C. Diver	Malcolm R. Willoughby	E-5	Navy		Packaged with the "S.H.A.R.C." submarine.
1984	Mutt and Junkyard	Dog Handler	Stanley R. Perlmutter	E-4 (Specialist)	Army	Anti-Venom Task Force, D.E.F., Slaughter's Marauders	Junkyard is Mutt's dog.
1984	Recondo	Jungle Trooper	Daniel M. LeClaire	E-4	Army	Tiger Force	Packaged with "Tiger Fly" attack helicopter for Tiger Force line
1984	Ripcord	HALO Jumper	Wallace A. Weems	E-4	Army		
1984	Roadblock	Heavy Machine Gunner	Marvin F. Hinton	E-4	Army	Anti-Venom Task Force, Star Brigade, Tiger Force	Roadblock is Heavy Duty's cousin.
1984	Spirit and Freedom	Tracker	Charlie Iron-Knife	E-4	Army	Slaughter's Marauders	Freedom is Spirit's eagle.
1984	Thunder	Self-Propelled Gun Artilleryman	Matthew H. Breckinridge	E-5	Army		Packaged with the "Slugger" self-propelled cannon. KIA (vol. 1) #109 – Executed by a SAW Viper.
1985	Airtight	Hostile Environment	Kurt Schnurr	E-4	Army		
1985	Alpine	Mountain Trooper	Albert M. Pine	E-4	Army		
1985	Barbecue	Firefighter	Gabriel A. Kelly	E-4	Army	Slaughter's Marauders	
1985	Bazooka	Missile Specialist	David L. Katzenbogen	E-5	Army	Tiger Force	
1985	Crankcase	A.W.E. Striker Driver	Elwood G. Indiana	E-4	Army		Packaged with the "A.W.E. Striker" vehicle. KIA (vol. 1) #109 – Executed by a SAW Viper.
1985	Dusty	Desert Trooper	Ronald W. Tadur	E-4	Army	Desert Patrol Squad, Tiger Force	"Sandstorm" coyote packaged with Ver. 3
1985	Flint	Warrant Officer	Dashiell R. Faireborn	W-3	Army	Eco-Warriors, Tiger Force	
1985	Footloose	Infantry Trooper	Andrew D. Meyers	E-4	Army	Slaughter's Marauders	
1985	Frostbite	Snow Cat Driver	Farley S. Seward	E-4	Army	Tiger Force	Packaged with the "Snow Cat" vehicle.
1985	Heavy Metal	Mauler M.B.T. Driver	Sherman R. Guderian	E-4	Army		Packaged with the "Mauler M.B.T." tank. KIA (vol. 1) #109 – Executed by a SAW Viper.
1985	Keel-Haul	Admiral	Everett P. Colby	O-9	Navy		USS Flagg commander; packaged with the "U.S.S. Flagg" aircraft carrier playset.
1985	Lady Jaye	Covert Operations	Alison R. Hart-Burnett	E-6	Army		Disavowed Continuity: KIA (vol. 2) #42 – Stabbed by Red Shadows agent Dela Eden.
1985	Quick Kick	Silent Weapons	MacArthur S. Ito	E-4	Army		KIA (vol. 1) #109 – Died while escaping in a stolen Cobra Rage tank.
1985	Sgt. Slaughter	Drill Instructor	Robert Rudolph Remus	E-7	Marine Corps	Slaughter's Marauders	Figure available by mail-in; inspired by professional wrestler Sgt. Slaughter.
1985	Shipwreck and Polly	Sailor	Hector X. Delgado	E-7	Navy		Polly is Shipwreck's parrot.
1985	Tollbooth	Bridge Layer Driver	Chuck X. (for nothing) Goren	E-5 (Specialist)	Army		Packaged with the "Toss 'n Cross" bridgelayer vehicle.
1986	Beach Head	Ranger	Wayne R. Sneeden	E-6	Army		
1986	Claymore	Covert operations	John Zullo	O-3	Army		TRU Exclusive
1986	Cross-Country	H.A.V.O.C. Driver	Robert M. Blais	E-5	Army		Packaged with the "H.A.V.O.C." vehicle.
1986	Dial Tone	Communications	Jack S. Morelli	E-4	Army	Tiger Force	
1986	The Fridge	Physical training instructor	William Perry	E-5	Army		Figure available by mail-in; inspired by football player William Perry.
1986	Iceberg	Snow Trooper	Clifton L. Nash	E-5	Army		
1986	Leatherneck	Marine	Wendell A. Metzger	E-7	Marine Corps		
1986	Lifeline	Rescue Trooper	Edwin C. Steen	E-5	Army	Tiger Force	First of two characters code named Lifeline.
1986	Lift-Ticket	Tomahawk Pilot	Victor W. Sikorski	W-2	Army		Packaged with the "Tomahawk" helicopter.
1986	Low-Light	Night Spotter	Cooper G. MacBride	E-6	Army	Slaughter's Marauders	
1986	Mainframe	Computer Specialist	Blaine L. Parker	E-5	Marine Corps		Disavowed Continuity: KIA (vol. 2) #25 – Died in an explosion during the second Cobra Civil War.
1986	Sci-Fi	Laser Trooper	Seymour P. Fine	E-4	Army	Star Brigade	
1986	Slip-Stream	Conquest X-30 Pilot	Gregory B. Boyajian	O-2	Air Force		Packaged with the "Conquest X-30" fighter jet.
1986	Wet Suit	SEAL	Brian M. Forrest	E-5	Navy		
1987	Avalanche	Dominator Driver	Ian M. Costello	E-5	Army	Battleforce 2000	KIA (vol. 1) #113 – Died while maneuvering through an oil field when it was bombed by Cobra Commander.
1987	Back-Stop	Persuader Driver	Robert A. Levin	N/A	Army		Packaged with the "Persuader" vehicle. One of two Joes without a rank/pay grade (the other being Storm Shadow).
1987	Blaster	Vindicator hovercraft Pilot	Brian R. Davis	E-5	Army	Battleforce 2000	KIA (vol. 1) #113 – Died while maneuvering through an oil field when it was bombed by Cobra Commander.
1987	Blocker	Eliminator Driver	David B. McCarthy	E-5	Army	Battleforce 2000	KIA (vol. 1) #113 – Died while maneuvering through an oil field when it was bombed by Cobra Commander.
1987	Chuckles	Undercover	Philip M. Provost	E-5	Army		Disavowed Continuity: KIA (vol. 2) #25 – Killed by The Coil general Overlord.
1987	Crazylegs	Assault Trooper	David O. Thomas	E-4	Army	Night Force	KIA (vol. 1) #109 – Died while escaping in a stolen Cobra Rage tank.
1987	Dodger	Marauder Driver	Richard Renwick	E-7	Army	Battleforce 2000	
1987	Fast Draw	Mobile Missile Specialist	Eliot Brown	E-4	Army		
1987	Hardtop	Crawler Driver	Nicholas D. Klas	E-5	Air Force		Packaged with the "Defiant" space shuttle playset.
1987	Jinx	Ninja/Intelligence	Kimi Arashikage	E-5	Army	Tiger Force	Cousin of Storm Shadow. IDW Continuity: KIA by Chuckles to protect his own undercover status in "Cobra" issue #3 (2009).
1987	Knockdown	Sky Sweeper Driver	Blaine M. Gonsalves	E-5	Army	Battleforce 2000	KIA (vol. 1) #113 – Died while maneuvering through an oil field when it was bombed by Cobra Commander.
1987	Law & Order	M.P. and K-9	Christopher M. Lavigne	E-4	Army		Order is Law's dog.
1987	Lt. Falcon	Green Beret	Vincent R. Falcone	O-2	Army	Night Force	Lt. Falcon is Duke's younger half-brother in G.I. Joe: The Movie
1987	Maverick	Vector Pilot	Thomas P. Kiley	O-3	Air Force	Battleforce 2000	KIA (vol. 1) #113 – Died while maneuvering through an oil field when it was bombed by Cobra Commander.
1987	Mercer	Renegade/Mercenary	Felix P. Stratton	E-5 (Equivalent)	Army	Renegades	
1987	Outback	Survivalist	Stuart R. Selkirk	E-5	Army	Night Force	
1987	Payload	Defiant Pilot	Mark Morgan, Jr.	O-6	Air Force	Star Brigade	Packaged with the "Defiant" space shuttle playset.
1987	Psyche-Out	Deceptive Warfare	Kenneth D. Rich	O-2	Army	Night Force	
1987	Red Dog	Renegade	David Taputapu	E-5 (Equivalent)	Army	Renegades	
1987	Rumbler	R/C Crossfire Driver	Earl-Bob Swilley	E-4	Army		Packaged with the "Crossfire" 4WD vehicle.
1987	Sneak Peek	Advanced Recon	Owen King	E-5	Army	Night Force	Believed KIA (vol. 1) #113 – Shot and believed killed during the battle of Benzheen. Later revealed that he survived, recovered, and was sent on a secret undercover mission.
1987	Starduster	Jetpack Trooper	Edward J. Skylar	E-5	Army		Figure available by mail-in; also released in 2008 as Skyduster. Later becomes commander of Comandos Heroicos.
1987	Steam Roller	Mobile Command Center Operator	Averill B. Whitcomb	E-5	Army		Packaged with the "Mobile Command Center".
1987	Taurus	Renegade	Varujan Ayvazyan	E-5 (Equivalent)	Army	Renegades	
1987	Tunnel Rat	E.O.D.	Nicky Lee	E-5	Army	Desert Patrol Squad, Night Force	
1988	Armadillo	Rolling Thunder Driver	Philo R. Makepeace	E-7	Army		Packaged with the "Rolling Thunder" vehicle.
1988	Blizzard	Arctic Attack Soldier	Gregory M. Natale	E-7	Army		
1988	Budo	Samurai Warrior	Kyle A. Jesso	E-5	Army		
1988	Charbroil	Flamethrower	Carl G. Shannon	E-4	Army	Anti-Venom Task Force, Night Force	
1988	Ghostrider	Phantom X-19 Stealth Fighter Pilot	Jonas S. Jeffries	O-4	Air Force		Packaged with the "Phantom X-19" stealth fighter.
1988	Hardball	Multi-Shot Grenadier	Wilmer S. Duggleby	E-4	Army		Disavowed Continuity: KIA (vol. 2) #38 – Killed by Red Shadows assassins in Brazil.
1988	Hit & Run	Light Infantryman	Brent Scott	E-4	Army		
1988	Lightfoot	Explosives Expert	Cory R. Owens	E-4	Army	Night Force	
1988	Muskrat	Swamp Fighter	Ross A. Williams	E-4	Army	Night Force	
1988	Repeater	Steadi-Cam Machine Gunner	Jeffrey R. Therien	E-6	Army	Night Force	
1988	Shockwave	S.W.A.T. Specialist	Jason A. Faria	E-4	Army	D.E.F., Night Force	Subsequently renamed Shockblast (2008)
1988	Skidmark	Desert Fox 6WD Driver	Cyril Colombani	E-4	Army		Packaged with the "Desert Fox" vehicle. Disavowed Continuity: KIA (vol. 2) #25 – Died when his vehicle exploded during the second Cobra Civil War.
1988	Skystriker	Tiger Rat Pilot	Alexander P. Russo	O-5	Air Force	Tiger Force	Packaged with the "Tiger Rat" fighter plane.
1988	Spearhead and Max	Pointman	Peter R. Millman	E-4	Army	Night Force	Max is Spearhead's bobcat.
1988	Storm Shadow	Ninja/Intelligence	Thomas S. Arashikage	N/A	Army	Ninja Force	This marks his first appearance as a member of the G.I. Joe team.
1988	Super Trooper	Infantry Trooper	Paul Latimer	O-2	Army		Figure available by mail-in.
1988	Wildcard	Mean Dog Driver	Eric U. Scott	E-4	Army		Packaged with the "Mean Dog" vehicle.
1988	Windmill	Skystorm X-Wing Chopper Pilot	Edward J. Roth	O-3	Army		Packaged with the "Skystorm" helicopter.
1989	Backblast	Anti-Aircraft Soldier	Edward J. Menninger	E-5	Army		
1989	Countdown	Astronaut	David D. Dubosky	O-3	Air Force	Star Brigade	
1989	Dee-Jay	Comm-tech Trooper	Thomas R. Rossi III	E-4 (Specialist)	Army	Battleforce 2000	KIA (vol. 1) #113 – Died while maneuvering through an oil field when it was bombed by Cobra Commander.
1989	Dogfight	Mudfighter Pilot	James R. King	O-2	Air Force		Packaged with the "Mudfighter" bomber.
1989	Downtown	Mortar Man	Thomas P. Riley	E-4	Army		
1989	Hot Seat	Raider Driver	Michael A. Provost	E-7	Army		Packaged with the "Raider" vehicle.
1989	Long Range	Thunderclap Driver	Karl W. Fritz	E-7	Army		Packaged with the "Thunderclap" vehicle. Another Long Range action figure was released in 2005, as part of the 4" G.I. Joe: Sigma 6 toyline.
1989	Recoil	LRRP (Long Range Recon Patrol)	Joseph Felton	E-5	Army		
1989	Scoop	Information Specialist	Leonard Michaels	E-4	Army		
1989	Windchill	Arctic Blast Driver	Jim Steel	E-6	Army		Packaged with the "Arctic Blast" vehicle.
1990	Airborne	Parachute assembler	Robert M. Six	E-7	Army	Sky Patrol	Second character code named Airborne.
1990	Airwave	Audible Frequency Specialist	Cliff V. Mewett	E-8	Army	Sky Patrol	Airwave's real name is listed as Cliff V. Mewett. The same name was used a few years later for Colonel Courage, though the character is African-American and born in a different city.
1990	Altitude	Recon Scout	John-Edward O. Jones	E-9	Army	Sky Patrol	
1990	Ambush	Concealment Specialist	Aaron McMahon	E-3	Army	Desert Patrol Squad	
1990	Bullhorn	Intervention Specialist	Stephen A. Ferreira	E-5	Marine Corps		
1990	Capt. Grid-Iron	Hand-to-hand combat Specialist	Terrence Lydon	O-3	Army		
1990	Cold Front	Avalanche Driver	Charles Donahue	E-7	Army		Packaged with the "Avalanche" vehicle.
1990	Drop Zone	Weapons Specialist	Samuel C. Delisi	E-8	Army	Sky Patrol	
1990	Freefall	Paratrooper	Philip W. Arndt	E-5	Army		
1990	Major Storm	General mobile headquarters commander	Robert G. Swanson	O-4	Army		
1990	Pathfinder	Jungle Assault Specialist	William V. Iannotti	E-6	Army		
1990	Rampart	Shoreline defender	Dwayne A. Felix	E-4	Navy		Disavowed Continuity: KIA (vol. 2) #38 – Killed by Red Shadows assassins in Brazil.
1990	Rapid Fire	Fast attack expert	Robbie London	O-3	Army		
1990	Salvo	Anti-armor Trooper	David K. Hasle	E-7	Army		
1990	Skydive	Sky Patrol leader	Lynton N. Felix	E-8	Army	Sky Patrol	
1990	Static Line	Demolitions expert	Wallace J. Badducci	E-7	Army	Sky Patrol	
1990	Stretcher	Medical Specialist	Thomas J. Larivee	E-5	Army		
1990	Sub-Zero	Winter Operations Specialist	Mark Habershaw	O-2	Army		
1990	Topside	Navy assault Trooper	John Blanchet	E-6	Navy		
1990	Updraft	Retaliator Pilot	Matthew W. Smithers	O-3	Army		Packaged with the "Retaliator" helicopter.
1991	Big Ben	SAS Fighter	David J. Bennett	E-7 (Equivalent)	Army (British)		
1991	Clean-Sweep	Anti-toxin Trooper	Daniel W. Price	E-4	Army	Eco-Warriors	
1991	Cloudburst	Glider Trooper	Chuck Ram	E-4	Army	Air Commandos	
1991	Heavy Duty	Heavy ordnance Trooper	Lamont A. Morris	E-5	Army		Heavy Duty is Roadblock's cousin.
1991	Major Altitude	Battle Copter Pilot	Robert D. Owens	W-2	Army	Battle Copters	
1991	Ozone	Ozone Replenisher Trooper	David F. Kunitz	E-4	Army	Eco-Warriors, Star Brigade	
1991	Skymate	Glider Trooper	Daniel T. Toner	E-5 (Equivalent)	Army (Australian)	Air Commandos	
1991	Tracker	SEAL	Christopher R. Groen	E-7	Navy		Disavowed Continuity: KIA (vol. 2) #37 – Killed by Red Shadows assassins in Fiji.
1992	Barricade	Bunker buster	Philip M. Holsinger	E-5	Army	Anti-Venom Task Force	
1992	Bullet-Proof	Drug Elimination Force leader/Urban commander	Earl S. Morris	O-4	Army	D.E.F.	
1992	Dojo	Silent weapons ninja	Michael P. Russo	E-8	Army	Ninja Force	
1992	General Flagg	G.I. Joe General	James Longstreet Flagg III	O-7	Army		Although the first General Flagg action figure to be released, he is actually the son of the original leader of the G.I. Joe Team.
1992	Nunchuk	Nunchaku ninja	Ralph Badducci	E-5	Army	Ninja Force	
1992	T'Jbang	Ninja swordsman	Sam LaQuale	E-7	Army	Ninja Force	
1993	Banzai	Rising Sun ninja	Robert J. Travaano	E-4	Army	Ninja Force	
1993	Blast-Off	Flame thrower	Jeffery D. Thompson	E-4	Marine Corps	Mega Marines	
1993	Bushido	Snow ninja	Lloyd S. Goldfine	E-5	Army	Ninja Force	
1993	Colonel Courage	Strategic commander	Cliff V. Mewett	O-6	Army		
1993	Long Arm	First strike Specialist	Thomas P. Mangiaratti	E-4	Army		
1993	Mace	Undercover operative	Thomas S. Bowman	E-8	Marine Corps		
1993	Mirage	Bio-artillery expert/Weapons expert	Joseph R. Balkun	E-6	Marine Corps	Mega Marines	
1993	Robo-Joe	Jet-tech operations expert	Greg D. Scott	E-3	Army	Star Brigade	Robo-Joe's real name is listed as Greg Scott, the same name used for Lifeline's v5 and v6 file cards.
1993	Snow Storm	High-tech Snow Trooper	Guillermo "Willie" Suarez	E-6	Army		
1993	T'Gin-Zu	Pile Driver operator	Joseph R. Rainone	E-4	Army	Ninja Force	
1994	Effects	Explosives expert	Aron Beck	E-6	Army	Star Brigade	
1994	G.I. Joe	N/A	Joseph B. Colton	O-10	Army	30th Anniversary	The original G.I. Joe, given his first figure in the A Real American Hero line to celebrate thirty years of the series. His filecard lists both his 1964 (O-2) and present day details.
1994	Gears	Invention technician	Joseph A. Morrone	O-3	Army	Star Brigade	
1994	Ice Cream Soldier	Flamethrower commando	Tom-Henry Ragan	E-5	Army		
1994	Space Shot	Combat freighter Pilot	George A. Roberts	E-4	Air Force	Star Brigade	

=== Stars & Stripes Forever – TRU exclusives (1997–1998) ===
Year	Code Name	Function	Real Name	Grade	Service Branch	Sub-team	Notes
1998	Thunderwing	Tank Commander	Spencer D. Crecelius	O-1	Army		

=== A Real American Hero Collection (2000–2002) ===
Year	Code Name	Function	Real Name	Grade	Service Branch	Sub-team	Notes
2000	Chameleon	Cobra intelligence officer	(Classified)	N/A	N/A		She is the illegitimate half-sister of the Baroness, and has taken on her identity as a spy for the G.I. Joe team.
2000	Sidetrack	Survival Specialist	Sean C. McLaughlin	E-6	Army		First of two characters code named Sidetrack.
2000	Whiteout	Arctic Trooper	Leonard J. Lee III	E-6	Army		
2001	Big Brawler	Jungle Mission Specialist	Brian K. Mulholland	E-8	Army	Tiger Force	
2001	Crossfire	Army machine gunner	Bill White	E-7	Army		
2001	Double Blast	Army machine gunner	Charles Griffith	E-8	Army		
2001	Sure Fire	Military police	David S. Lane	O-5	Army		
2001	Wet Down	SEAL	Daniel R. Alexander	W-5	Navy		
2002	Dart	Pathfinder	Jimmy Tall Elk	E-6	Army		
2002	Lifeline	Rescue Trooper	Greg Scott	E-5	Army	Anti-Venom Task Force	Second character code named Lifeline.
2002	Sideswipe	Medical Specialist	Andrew Frankel	E-5	Army		
2002	Sidetrack	Ranger	John Boyce	E-7	Army		Second character code named Sidetrack.

=== G.I. Joe vs Cobra (2002–2005) ===
Year	Code Name	Function	Real Name	Grade	Service Branch	Sub-team	Notes
2002	G.I. Joe Reservist	Reservist	N/A	N/A	Army		Figure available by mail-in.
2003	Agent Faces	Infiltrator	Michelino J. Paolino	E-4	Army		
2003	Barrel Roll	High altitude sniper	Dwight E. Stall	O-2	Army		Barrel Roll is the brother of both G.I. Joe Bombstrike and Cobra Black Out.
2003	Cross Hair	Infiltrator/sniper	Don G. Fardie	E-4	Army		
2003	Depth Charge	Underwater demolitions	Nick H. Langdon	E-5	Navy		
2003	Hollow Point	Range Officer	Max W. Corey	E-6	Marine Corps		Built-To-Rule line
2003	Kamakura	Ninja	Sean Broca/Sean Collins	E-5	Army		
2003	Rampage	Split Fire Driver	Walter A. McDaniel	E-6	Army		
2003	Red Spot	Laser Trooper	Michael P. Ritchie	E-4	Army		
2003	Sgt. Hacker	Information retrieval	Jessie H. Jordon	E-5	Army		
2003	Switch Gears	Tank Driver	Jerome T. Jivoin	E-5	Army		
2003	Wide Scope	Special weapons and tactical	Larry M. Kranseler	E-5	Army		
2003	Wreckage	Demolitions Specialist	Dillon L. Moreno	E-4	Army	Tiger Force	TRU Exclusive
2004	Action Man	International Super Agent	(Classified)	N/A	N/A		TRU Exclusive. Disavowed Continuity: KIA (vol. 2) #37 – Killed by Red Shadows assassins in Fiji.
2004	Dr. Link Talbot	Combat Veterinarian	Lincoln B. Talbot	E-4	Navy		
2004	General Flagg	G.I. Joe General	Lawrence J. Flagg	O-7	Army		KIA (vol. 1) #19. The original leader of the G.I. Joe Team.
2004	Hard Drive	Battlefield Computer Specialist	Martin A. Pidel	E-4	Army		
2004	Hi-Tech	Operations Support Specialist	David P. Lewinski	E-4	Army		
2004	Rollbar	Humvee Driver	Robert D. Dubé	E-4	Army		
2004	Tracker Kwinn	Mercenary	Jesse Kwinn	N/A	N/A		
2005	Bombstrike	Forward Air Controller	Alyssa Renee Stall	E-4	Air Force		Bombstrike is the sister of both G.I. Joe Barrel Roll and Cobra Black Out.
2005	Cannonball	RHINO Driver	John Warden	E-4	Army		
2005	Major Barrage	Artillery commander	David Vennemeyer	O-4	Army		
2005	Tiger Claw	Ninja apprentice	Chad M. Johnson	E-4	Army		

=== Direct to Consumer (DTC) (2005–2006) ===
Year	Code Name	Function	Real Name	Grade	Service Branch	Sub-team	Notes
2006	Checkpoint	Steel Brigade Security	Jared Wade	E-4	Army	Steel Brigade	DTC/TRU Exclusive (Plague Troopers vs Steel Brigade)
2006	G.I. Jane	Physicist	Jane Ann Martelle	E-5	Army		DTC Exclusive (Viper Lockdown)
2006	Red Zone	Steel Brigade Urban Assault	Luke Ellison	E-4	Army	Steel Brigade	
2006	Med Alert	Medic	Kirk Bacus	E-4	Army		
2006	Rook	Steel Brigade Interrogator	Andy Lombardi	E-4	Army	Steel Brigade	DTC/TRU Exclusive (Plague Troopers vs Steel Brigade)

=== 25th Anniversary (2007–2009) ===
Year	Code Name	Function	Real Name	Grade	Service Branch	Sub-team	Notes
2008	G.I. Joe Trooper	Infantry Trooper	(Various)	(Various)	(Various)		TRU Exclusive (Firefly Versus G.I. Joe Troopers)
2008	Hard Master	Arashikage Leader	N/A	N/A	N/A		
2008	Specialist Trakker	Advanced Vehicle Specialist	Matt Trakker	N/A	N/A	Mobile Armored Strike Kommand	Leader of M.A.S.K., a toyline from Kenner originally unrelated to G.I. Joe.

=== Rise of Cobra (2009) ===
Year	Code Name	Function	Real Name	Grade	Service Branch	Sub-team	Notes
2009	Agent Helix	Covert Operations	CLASSIFIED	E-4	Army		Original character from Double Helix's "G.I. Joe: The Rise of Cobra" video game, hence her code name.
2009	Dialtone	Communications	Jill S. Morelli	E-4 (Specialist)	Army		TRU Exclusive, sister of the original Dial Tone.
2009	G.I. Joe Pit Commando	Covert Military Force	Various	E-4 (Specialist)	Army		
2009	G.I. Joe Pit Trooper	Covert Military Force	Various	E-4	Army		TRU Exclusive, part of the "Attack on the G.I. Joe Pit Headquarters" set
2009	Ice Storm	Cold-Water Marine Combat & Survival Specialist	Nolan A. MacPhee	E-5	Army		Ross Exclusive; Packaged with "Polar Sharc Submarine".
2009	Sgt. Stone	Special Forces Commando	Geoffrey Stone IV	E-5	Army		

=== Pursuit of Cobra (2010–2011) ===
Year	Code Name	Function	Real Name	Grade	Service Branch	Sub-team	Notes
2010	Kickstart	Steel Marauder Pilot	Joseph A. Rivera	E-5	Army		Packaged with the "Steel Marauder" Mobile Mech Suit.
2010	Night Fox	Special Combat and Operations Expert	Armando M. Ortiz	E-5	Navy		Packaged with the "A.W.E. Striker".
2010	Sandstorm	Military Police	Joseph M. Benjamin	E-4 (Specialist)	Army		Target Exclusive; packaged with the "RAM Cycle".
2010	Tomahawk	Pilot	William P. Folger	O-2	Air Force		Packaged with the "Ghost H.A.W.K."

=== 30th Anniversary (2011–2012) ===
Year	Code Name	Function	Real Name	Grade	Service Branch	Sub-team	Notes
2011	Steel Brigade Delta	Combat Vehicle Driver	N/A	E-4 (Specialist)	Army		Packaged with the "V.A.M.P. Mk II"

=== 50th Anniversary (2014–2016) ===
Year	Code Name	Function	Real Name	Grade	Service Branch	Sub-team	Notes
2015	Sightline	Anti-Aircraft Support	Gary Goggles	E-6	Army		Packaged with the "Skystriker"
2016	Stiletto	Security	Paithoon Kwaigno	E-5	Army		Stiletto is a Cobra agent undercover in the G.I. Joe team.
2016	Jodie "Shooter" Craig	G.I. Joe Marksman	Jodie F. Craig	E-7	Army		

=== Convention exclusives ===
Year	Code Name	Function	Real Name	Grade	Service Branch	Sub-team	Notes
2005	Steel Brigade Commander	G. I. JOE Security Force Leader	(Classified)	N/A	N/A	Steel Brigade	Convention Exclusive
2005	Steel Brigade Paratrooper	G. I. JOE Security Force	(Various)	(Various)	(Various)	Steel Brigade	Convention Exclusive
2007	Sparks	Communications Expert	Alessandro D. Verdi	E-5	Army		Convention Exclusive
2007	G.I. Joe Doc	Medical Doctor	Carla P. Greer	O-3	Army		Convention Exclusive; G.I. Joe Doc is the niece of the original "Doc" (1983).
2009	Blades	S.A.F. Helicopter Pilot	Herbert J. Rotweiler	W-2	Army	Special Action Force	Convention Exclusive
2009	Sgt. Manleh	Jet Pack Trooper	Jason Kavanagh	E-5 (Equivalent)	Army (Argentine)	Comandos Heroicos	Convention Exclusive
2009	Sgt. Redmack	Mountain Trooper	Reginald Cobb	E-5	Army	Comandos Heroicos	Convention Exclusive
2009	Sgt. Shimik	Commando	Jerome Ford	E-8 (Equivalent)	Army (Argentine)	Comandos Heroicos	Convention Exclusive
2009	Sgt. Topson	Communications	Frank Barbieri	E-6 (Equivalent)	Army (Argentine)	Comandos Heroicos	Convention Exclusive
2010	Agent Natalie Poole	S.A.F. Covert Operations	Natalie Poole	E-7 (Equivalent)	MI-6	Special Action Force	Convention Exclusive
2010	Gaucho	Z Force Mechanic	Rico Gonzalles	E-6 (Equivalent)	Army (Mexican)	Special Action Force / Z Force	Convention Exclusive
2010	Jammer	Z Force Communications	Calvin Mondale	E-7 (Equivalent)	Army (British)	Special Action Force / Z Force	Convention Exclusive; Jammer is an American ex-pat.
2010	Lt. Dolphin	Q Force Commander	Gareth Morgan	O-1 (Equivalent)	Navy (British)	Special Action Force / Q Force	Convention Exclusive
2011	Sparta	G.I. Joe Secret Agent	Brigid Cortez	N/A	N/A	Mission Brazil II	Convention Exclusive
2013	Freestyle	Night Force Fighter Pilot	Jocelyn De La Vega	O-3	Air Force	Night Force	Convention Exclusive
2015	Felino	Tiger Shark Pilot	Joao Kayapo	E-4		Tiger Force	Convention Exclusive

=== G.I. Joe Collector's Club exclusives ===
Year	Code Name	Function	Real Name	Grade	Service Branch	Sub-team	Notes
2010	Big Lob	G.I. Joe Reservist	Bradley J. Sanders	E-4 (Specialist)	Army		G.I. Joe Collector's Club Exclusive
2013	Quarrel	Undercover Operations	Hedda Pulver	E-6 (equivalent)	Army (Switzerland)	Z Force	G.I. Joe Collector's Club Exclusive
2013	Theodore M. Thomas	Bomb Disposal Expert	Theodore M. Thomas	E-6 (equivalent)	Army (Argentine)	Comandos Heroicos	G.I. Joe Collector's Club Exclusive
2014	Bombardier	S.A.F. Experiential Weapons	Connor D. Tree	E-5 (equivalent)	Army (U.K.)	Action Force	G.I. Joe Collector's Club Exclusive
2015	Marissa Fairborn	EDC Cybertronian Liaison	Marissa Fairborne	O-3	Air Force		G.I. Joe Collector's Club Exclusive
2016	Billy Arboc	Son of Cobra Commander	William Kesler (Alias)				G.I. Joe Collector's Club Exclusive
2017	Captain Skip	Special Action Force Officer	Grant J. Campbell	O-3 (equivalent)	Army (U.K.)	Special Action Force / Z Force	G.I. Joe Collector's Club Exclusive

== Cobra ==
Year	Code Name	Function	Real Name	Notes
1982	Cobra Commander	Enemy Leader	Classified	Hooded version of figure available in 1984 by mail-in.
1982	Cobra Officer	The Enemy	Various	Generic officer action figure.
1982	Cobra Soldier	The Enemy	Various	Generic soldier action figure.
1983	Major Bludd	Mercenary	Sebastian Bludd	
1983	Cobra H.I.S.S. Driver	The Enemy	Various	Packaged with the Cobra "H.I.S.S." vehicle.
1983	Viper Pilot	The Enemy	Various	Packaged with the Cobra "Viper Glider".
1984	Baroness	Cobra Intelligence Officer	Anastasia Cissarovna (Alias: Anastasia DeCobray)	
1984	Copperhead	Water Moccasin Driver	Classified	Packaged with the Cobra "Water Moccasin" vehicle.
1984	Firefly	Cobra Saboteur	Classified	
1984	Scrap-Iron	Cobra Anti-Armor Specialist	Classified	
1984	Storm Shadow	Cobra Ninja	Tomisaburo "Tommy" Arashikage	Has worked for Cobra and G.I. Joe.
1984	Cobra Stinger Driver	The Enemy	Various	Packaged with the Cobra "Stinger" vehicle.
1984	Wild Weasel	Rattler Pilot	Classified	Packaged with the Cobra "Rattler" fighter plane.
1985	Crimson Guard	Cobra Elite Trooper	Top Secret	
1985	Eels	Cobra Frogman	Various	
1985	Lamprey	Cobra Hydrofoil Pilot	Various	Packaged with the Cobra "Moray" hydrofoil.
1985	Snow Serpent	Cobra Polar Assault	Various	
1985	Tele-Vipers	Cobra Communications	Various	
1985	Tomax and Xamot	Crimson Guard Commanders	Classified	
1986	A.V.A.C.	Cobra Terror Drome Firebat Pilot	Various	Air-Viper, Advanced Class; packaged with the Cobra "Terror Drome" playset.
1986	B.A.T.	Cobra Android Trooper	N/A	
1986	Dr. Mindbender	Master of Mind Control	Brian Bender	KIA (vol. 1) #98 – Buried alive in Cobra Island freighter by Cobra Commander during the Cobra Civil War. Disavowed Continuity: Clone later killed in issue #41 of the Devil's Due RAH series.
1986	Motor-Viper	Cobra Stun Pilot	Various	Packaged with the Cobra "STUN" vehicle.
1986	Serpentor	Cobra Emperor	Serpentor	KIA (vol. 1) #76 – Shot in the face with an arrow by Zartan during the Cobra Civil War.
1986	Strato-Viper	Cobra Night Raven Pilot	Various	Packaged with the Cobra "Night Raven S3P" fighter jet.
1986	Viper	Cobra Infantry	Various	
1987	Big Boa	Cobra Trainer	Unknown	Disavowed Continuity: KIA (vol. 2) #38 – Killed by Red Shadows operatives while in Brazil.
1987	Croc Master	Cobra Reptile trainer	Unknown	KIA (vol. 1) #98 – Buried alive in Cobra Island freighter by Cobra Commander during the Cobra Civil War.
1987	Crystal Ball	Cobra Hypnotist	Unknown	
1987	Golobulus	Cobra-La Ruler		
1987	Gyro-Viper	Mamba Driver	Various	Packaged with the Cobra "Mamba" helicopter.
1987	Ice-Viper	Cobra W.O.L.F. Driver	Various	Packaged with the Cobra "W.O.L.F." vehicle.
1987	Nemesis Enforcer	Cobra-La Team		
1987	Raptor	Cobra Falconer	Unknown	KIA (vol. 1) #98 – Buried alive in Cobra Island freighter by Cobra Commander during the Cobra Civil War.
1987	Royal Guard	Cobra-La Team		
1987	Sea Slug	Sea Ray Navigator	Various	Packaged with the Cobra "Sea Ray" vehicle.
1987	Techno-Viper	Cobra Battlefield Technician	Various	
1987	W.O.R.M.S.	Maggot Driver	Various	Short for Weapons Ordinance Rugged Machine Specialists; packaged with the Cobra "Maggot" vehicle.
1988	Astro-Viper	Cobranaut	Various	
1988	Hydro-Viper	Cobra Underwater Elite Trooper	Various	Demon of the Deep
1988	Secto-Viper	Cobra Bugg Driver	Various	Packaged with the Cobra "BUGG" vehicle.
1988	Star-Viper	Cobra Stellar Stiletto Pilot	Various	Packaged with the Cobra "Stellar Stiletto" vehicle.
1988	Toxo-Viper	Cobra Hostile Environment Trooper	Various	
1989	Aero-Viper	Condor Z-25 Pilot	Various	Packaged with the Cobra "Condor Z-25" fighter jet.
1989	Alley Viper	Cobra Urban Assault Trooper	Various	
1989	Frag-Viper	Cobra Grenade Thrower	Various	
1989	HEAT Viper	Cobra Bazooka Man	Various	
1989	Night-Viper	Cobra Night Fighter	Various	
1989	Track-Viper	H.I.S.S. II Driver	Various	Packaged with the Cobra "H.I.S.S. II" vehicle.
1990	Decimator	Cobra Hammerhead Driver	Unknown	Packaged with the Cobra "Hammerhead" submersible sea tank.
1990	Laser-Viper	Cobra Laser Trooper	Various	
1990	Night Creeper	Cobra Ninja	Various	
1990	Overlord	Dictator Driver	Unknown	Packaged with the Cobra "Dictator" vehicle; killed by Joe operative Scanner in the Devils Due RAH series.
1990	Range-Viper	Cobra Wilderness Troopers	Various	
1990	Rock-Viper	Cobra Mountain Trooper	Various	
1990	S.A.W.-Viper	Cobra Heavy Machine Gunner	Various	Semi Automatic Weapon
1990	Vapor	Cobra Hurricane VTOL Pilot	Unknown	Packaged with the Cobra "Hurricane V.T.O.L.".
1991	Cesspool	Chief Environmental Operative	Vincent A. D'Alleva	Disavowed Continuity: KIA (America's Elite) #30 – executed during raid on G.I. Joe prison facility.
1991	Crimson Guard Immortal	Cobra Elite Trooper	Top Secret	
1991	Desert Scorpion	Cobra Desert Trooper	Various	
1991	Incinerators	Cobra Flamethrowers	Various	
1991	Interrogator	Cobra Battle Copter Pilot	Unknown	
1991	Night Vulture	Air Recon Trooper	Various	
1991	Overkill	B.A.T. Leader	Unknown	Disavowed Continuity: KIA (America's Elite) #30 – executed during raid on G.I. Joe prison facility.
1991	Sky Creeper	Air Recon Leader	Unknown	Disavowed Continuity: KIA (Special Missions: The Enemy) – Shot and thrown out of a helicopter by Black Out and Guillotine.
1991	Sludge Viper	Cobra Hazardous Waste Viper	Various	
1992	Cobra Air Devil	Acrobatic Aerial Assault Trooper	Various	
1992	Dice	Cobra Bo-staff Ninja	Unknown	
1992	Flak-Viper	Cobra Anti-aircraft Trooper	Various	
1992	Headhunters	Headman's Narcotic Guard	Various	
1992	Headman	Headhunter Drug Kingpin	Unknown	Disavowed Continuity: KIA (America's Elite) #30 – executed during raid on G.I. Joe prison facility.
1992	Heli-Vipers	Cobra Battle Copter Troopers	Various	
1992	Ninja-Viper		Various	
1992	Slice	Cobra Ninja Swordsman	Unknown	
1992	Toxo-Zombie	Cobra Toxic Disaster Trooper	Various	
1993	Bio-Vipers	Mega Monster	Various	Eels that were spliced with the DNA of giant squids, moray eels, piranhas, rockfish, and sharks by Doctor Mindbender.
1993	Cobra BAAT	Battle Armored Android Trooper	N/A	Released as part of the "Star Brigade" line.
1993	Night Creeper Leader	Ninja Supreme Master	Unknown	
1993	Crimson Guard Commander	Cobra Elite Officer	Top Secret	
1993	Cyber-Vipers	Cybernetic Officers	Various	
1993	Gristle	Headhunter Urban Crime Commander	Danimal J. Rogers	
1993	Mega-Vipers	Mega Monster Trainers	Various	
1993	Monstro-Vipers	Mega Monster	Various	Range-Vipers that were spliced with the DNA of bats, Bigfoot-like creatures, grizzly bears, and werewolves by Doctor Mindbender.
1993	Nitro-Viper	Detonator Driver	Unknown	Packaged with the Cobra "Detonator" vehicle.
1993	Red Ninjas	Battle Axe Operators	Unknown	
1993	Headhunter Stormtroopers	Headhunter Elite Urban Crime Guards	Various	
1994	Cobra Blackstar	Elite Space Pilot	Unknown	Released as part of the "Star Brigade" line.
1994	Carcass	Alien Destroyer		
1994	Lobotomaxx	Stellar Explorer		
1994	Predacon	Alien Bounty hunter		
1998	Vypra	Rattler 4-WD Driver	Ann A. Conda	
2000	Rip It	Heavy Equipment Operator	Fredd T. Booth III	Disavowed Continuity: KIA (Special Missions: The Enemy) – Shot and thrown out of a helicopter by Black Out and Guillotine.
2001	Cobra Fast Blast Viper	Field Combat	Various	
2001	Iguanus	Manimal Stellar Stalker		
2001	Shadow Viper	Counter Intelligence	Various	
2001	Slythor	Manimal Galactic Attacker		
2001	Sub Viper	Underwater Demolitions	Various	
2001	Warwolf	Manimal Alien Mutation Expert		
2002	Cobra C.L.A.W.S.	Heavy Weapons Trooper	Various	Combat Light Armored Weapons Specialist
2002	Cobra Moray	Cobra Underwater Elite Operations	Various	
2002	Desert Cobra C.L.A.W.S.	Heavy Weapons Trooper	Various	
2002	Neo-Viper	Cobra Infantry Officers	Various	
2002	Neo-Viper Commander	Neo-Viper Leader	Unknown	
2002	Shock Viper	Cobra Fire Assault Trooper	Various	
2002	Skull Buster	Cobra Range-Viper Commander	Unknown	
2003	Air-Viper	Cobra Air Force Trainee	Various	Convention Exclusive
2003	Black Dragon Leader	Spy Organization Warlord	Unknown	Convention Exclusive; leader of the Black Dragon organization
2003	Black Dragon Trooper	Spy Organization Agents of Destruction	Various	Convention Exclusive
2003	Black Out	Cobra Sniper	Thomas G. Stall	Black Out is the brother of both G.I. Joe Bombstrike and Barrel Roll.
2003	Cobra C.L.A.W.S. Commander	Combat Light Armored Weapons Specialist	Top Secret	
2003	Cobra Coils	High Speed Pursuit Vehicle Driver	Various	
2003	Cobra Inferno BAT	Battle Android Trooper	N/A	Internet Exclusive (B.A.T. Army Builder)
2003	Heavy Water Trooper	Cobra Radiological Weapons Specialists	Various	
2003	Pit Viper	Cobra Infiltration Trooper	Various	
2003	Sand Viper	Cobra Desert Infiltrators	Various	
2003	Scalpel	Cobra Medic	Andrew R. Walker	
2003	Swamp-Viper	Amphibious Assault Troopers	Various	Convention Exclusive
2004	Alley Viper II	Cobra Urban Assault Trooper	Various	
2004	Black Dragon Ninja	Cobra Ninja Warrior	Unknown	TRU Exclusive (Ninja Cobra Strike Force)
2004	Cobra BAT II	Cobra Android Trooper	N/A	
2004	Cobra Infantry Trooper	Cobra Infantry	Various	TRU Exclusive (Cobra Infantry Forces)
2004	Cobra Ninja Trooper	Cobra Ninja Warrior	Unknown	
2004	Cobra Squad Leader	Cobra Infantry Troop Leader	Unknown	TRU Exclusive (Cobra Infantry Forces)
2004	Coil Crusher	Cobra Silent infiltrator	Unknown	A Jungle-Viper who was spliced with the Venom formula and the DNA of a snake.
2004	Electric E.E.L.	Cobra V-Troop Underwater Specialist	Various	Morays that were spliced with the Venom formula and the DNA of electric eels.
2004	Ghost Bear	Pulverizer Driver	Jesse Kwinn Jr.	The son of late Cobra mercenary Kwinn.
2004	Neurotoxin	Cobra Sand Scorpion Leader	Unknown	The leader of the Sand Scorpions who was spliced with the Venom formula and the DNA of a scorpion.
2004	Razor Trooper	Cobra V-Troop Infantry	Various	Cobra soldiers that were spliced with the Venom formula and the DNA of a tiger.
2004	Razorclaw	Cobra Feral Berserker	Unknown	The leader of the Razor Troopers who was spliced with the Venom formula and the DNA of a tiger.
2004	Sand Scorpion	Cobra Elite Desert Trooper	Various	Cobra soldiers that were spliced with the Venom formula and the DNA of a scorpion.
2004	Snow Wolf	Cobra V-Troop Polar Sentry	Various	Cobra soldiers that were spliced with the Venom formula and the DNA of an arctic wolf.
2004	Swamp Rat	Cobra V-Troop Infiltrators	Various	Cobra soldiers and captive civilians that were spliced with the Venom formula and the DNA of a marsh rat.
2004	Venomous Maximus	Cobra V-Troop Overlord	Clayton Abernathy/General Hawk	Overlord of Cobra's V-Troops (as seen in G.I. Joe: Valor vs. Venom). He was once General Hawk, commander of the G.I. Joe team who was abducted by Cobra and spliced with the Venom formula and the DNA of unspecified apex predators.
2005	Cobra Imperial Guard	Elite Guards for Cobra Commander	Top Secret	TRU Exclusive (Cobra Imperial Procession)
2005	Cobra Night Trooper	Cobra Night Watch	Various	DTC Exclusive (Cobra Night Watch)
2005	Cobra Slash	Cobra Ninja/Mercenary	Unknown	
2005	Cobra Squad Leader	Cobra Night Watch	Unknown	DTC Exclusive (Cobra Night Watch)
2005	Crimson Shadow Guard	Cobra Elite Trooper	Top Secret	TRU Exclusive (Crimson Shadow Guard)
2005	Croc Master II	Reptile Leader	Unknown	The second man to hold this title whose green appearance implies that he was spliced with the Venom formula and the DNA of a crocodile. Killed by Baroness.
2005	Cobra Commander	Cobra Supreme Leader	Fred VII	Cobra Commander Impostor
2005	Jungle-Viper	Cobra Jungle Assault Trooper	Various	G.I. Joe Collector's Club Exclusive
2005	Medi-Viper	Cobra Medical Trooper	Various	
2005	Shadow Strike	Cobra Ninja	Unknown	
2006	Cobra Mortal	Cobra Elite Enforcer	Unknown	Convention Exclusive
2006	Cobra Viper Guard	Cobra Infantrymen	Various	DTC Exclusive (Viper Lockdown)
2006	Coil Trooper	Mercenary Soldier	Various	Convention Exclusive
2006	Gallows	Plague Trooper	Unknown	DTC/TRU Exclusive (Plague Troopers vs Steel Brigade)
2006	Grim Skull	Plague Trooper	Unknown	DTC/TRU Exclusive (Plague Troopers vs Steel Brigade)
2006	Guillotine	Plague Trooper Commander	Unknown	DTC/TRU Exclusive (Plague Troopers vs Steel Brigade)
2006	Hannibal: Reborn	General	Hannibal	DTC/TRU Exclusive. He is a teenage clone of Serpentor.
2006	Skull Squad Trooper	Soldiers of Fortune	Various	Convention Exclusive
2007	Lt. Clay Moore	Shock Viper Commander	Clayton W. Moore	Convention Exclusive
2007	Snow Serpent Commander	Cobra Polar Assault Leader	Munroe B. Egavas	G.I. Joe Collector's Club Exclusive
2008	Cobra Sky BAT	Battle Android Trooper	N/A	Convention Exclusive
2008	Headhunter B.A.T.	Headhunter Battle Android Troopers	N/A	Convention Exclusive
2008	Headhunter Guards	Headhunter Guardians	Various	Convention Exclusive
2008	Headhunter Driver	Headhunter Vehicle Operators	Various	Convention Exclusive
2008	Hotwire	B.A.T. Mechanic	Unknown	Convention Exclusive
2009	Munitia	Mercenary	Unknown	G.I. Joe Collectors' Club Exclusive
2010	Black Major	Red Shadows Commander	John Shepherd (alias)	Convention Exclusive. His history with Action Force remains intact and followed the Red Ninjas into joining Cobra.
2010	Red Shadows	Red Shadows Troopers	Various	Convention Exclusive. The foot soldiers of the Red Shadows.
2010	Red Torches	Red Shadows Pyro-Troopers	Various	Convention Exclusive. The pyro-troopers of the Red Shadows.

=== 25th Anniversary-style Cobra figures ===
Year	Code Name	Function	Real Name	Notes
2007	Cobra Air Trooper	Elite Infantry	Unknown	Part of the "Cobra Legions" box set
2008	Cobra Bazooka Trooper	Anti-Armor Trooper	Various	
2008	Cobra Diver	Underwater Trooper	Various	
2008	Cobra Driver	Cobra Infantry Trooper	Unknown	Target Exclusive; packaged with the "Cobra H.I.S.S." vehicle
2008	Cobra HISS Commander	Cobra Infantry	Various	Packaged with the "Cobra H.I.S.S." vehicle
2008	Cobra Paratrooper	Airborne Infantry	Various	Part of a "DVD Battles Pack"
2008	Para-Viper	Cobra Paratrooper	Various	
2008	Cobra Pilot	Air Trooper	Various	Packaged with the "Cobra F.A.N.G. & Cobra C.L.A.W." vehicle set.
2008	Cobra Vehicle Gunner	Cobra Infantry	Various	Target Exclusive (Ultimate Battle Pack)
2008	Crimson Guard Officer	Cobra Elite Officer	Top Secret	TRU Exclusive (Senior Ranking Officers 3-pack)
2008	Crimson Guard Squad Leader	Cobra Elite Officer	Top Secret	TRU Exclusive (Crimson Guard 5-pack)
2008	Mercenary Wraith	Counter Intelligence	Charles Halifax	Disavowed Continuity: KIA – killed by Baroness in G.I. Joe: America's Elite.
2008	Montezuma's Skeleton	Montezuma's Skeleton	Moctezuma Xocoyotzin	Part of a "DVD Battles Pack" as a prop.
2008	Snow Serpent Officer	Polar Assault Officer	Various	Internet Exclusive (Cobra Arctic Assault Squad pack)
2008	Cobra Night Watch Officer	The Enemy	Unknown	TRU Exclusive (Cobra Night Watch 5-pack)
2008	Cobra Red Ninja Leader	The Enemy	Unknown	TRU Exclusive (Snake-Eyes vs. Red Ninja Troopers 5-pack). The leader of the Red Ninjas.
2009	Aqua-Viper Officer	Aqua-Viper Leader	Various	Packaged with the "Mantis Attack Craft".
2009	Desert-Viper	Desert Battle	Various	
2009	Elite-Viper	Elite Regiment Officer	Various	
2009	Nano-Viper	Cobra Commando	Unknown	
2009	Neo-Viper Officer	Cobra Commando	Various	TRU Exclusive, part of the "Attack on the G.I. Joe Pit Headquarters" set
2009	Night Adder	Cobra Security Officer	Unknown	
2009	Red Fang Ninja	Cobra Ninja	Various	The Red Fang Ninjas are mercenaries that work for Storm Shadow.
2009	Terra-Viper	Mole Pod Pilot	Various	Packaged with the "Cobra Mole Pod".
2011	Shadow Tracker	Cobra Jungle Tracker	Unknown	
2011	Cobra Crimson Horseman	Cobra H.I.S.S. Tank Driver	Various	Packaged with the "Cobra Crimson H.I.S.S." tank. They are members of the Crimson Guard that specialize in mobile combat tactics.
2011	Hazard-Viper	Toxin Specialist	Various	
2011	Lightning (Relâmpago)	Python Patrol Boat Pilot	Unknown	Convention Exclusive
2011	Steel Cobra (Cobra de Aco)	Cobra Commando	Unknown	Convention Exclusive
2011	Trigger (Gatilho)	Python Patrol Sniper	Unknown	Convention Exclusive
2011	Zombie Viper	Cobra Trooper	Various	Cobra soldiers that were given a mysterious chemical substance called Compound Z that turned them into mindless zombies.
2012	Cobra Stealth Paratrooper	N/A	N/A	Convention Exclusive
2013	Crimson Asp	Cobra Saboteur	Sioban A. Nathair	Convention Exclusive
2013	Cobra Letal	Cobra Grenadier Commander	Unknown	Convention Exclusive
2013	Iron Klaw	Dictator	Unknown	G.I. Joe Collector's Club Exclusive. Based on the main villain from G.I. Joe Extreme.
2013	Nano-B.A.T.	Cobra Battle Android Trooper	N/A	G.I. Joe Collector's Club Exclusive
2014	Arctic B.A.T.	Cobra Battle Android Trooper	N/A	50th Anniversary
2014	Cobra Viper Officer	Cobra Infantry	Various	50th Anniversary
2014	Cobra Lab-Rats	Cobra Industries Technician	Various	Convention Exclusive
2014	Repulsor	Toxo-Viper Commander	Frederick M. Townsend	Convention Exclusive
2015	Advanced Stealth B.A.T.	Stealth Battle Android Trooper	N/A	Collector's Club Exclusive
2015	Elite Horseman	Tank Driver	Various	50th Anniversary
2015	H.I.S.S. Gunner	Tank Gunner	Various	50th Anniversary
2016	Tombstone	Psyops Command	Unknown	50th Anniversary
2017	Steel Raven	S.K.A.R. Infantry Officer	Unknown	G.I. Joe Collector's Club Exclusive. Based on the character from G.I. Joe Extreme.

=== Dreadnoks ===
Year	Code Name	Function	Real Name	Notes
1984	Zartan	Master of Disguise	Zeke (real last name unknown) (Aliases too numerous to list)	
1985	Buzzer	Dreadnok	Richard Blinken-Smythe (Alias: Dick Blinken)	
1985	Ripper	Dreadnok	Harry Nod	
1985	Torch	Dreadnok	Tom Winken	
1986	Monkeywrench	Dreadnok	Bill Winkie	Disavowed Continuity: KIA (America's Elite) #30 – executed during raid on G.I. Joe prison facility.
1986	Thrasher	Dreadnok/Thunder Machine Driver	Bruno LaCrosse	Packaged with the Dreadnok "Thunder Machine".
1986	Zandar	Zartan's brother	Zachary (real last name unknown)	
1986	Zarana	Zartan's sister	Zoe (real last name unknown)	
1987	Zanzibar	Dreadnok Pirate	Morgan Teach	Packaged with the Dreadnok "Air Skiff".
1988	Road Pig	Dreadnok	Donald DeLuca	
1989	Gnawgahyde	Dreadnok Poacher	Clyde Hyde	Disavowed Continuity: Listed as "missing" in America's Elite #25.
2003	Burn Out	Mechanic	Walter O. Jones	
2004	Crusher	Dreadnok Agent	Roberto K. Rivera	Convention Exclusive
2004	Demolisher	Dreadnok Agent	Sukko Torngark	Convention Exclusive
2004	Dreadhead Billy-Bob	Dreadnok Recruit	Horatio T. Wesson	Convention Exclusive
2004	Dreadhead Cletus	Dreadnok Recruit	Terrance W. Wesson	Convention Exclusive
2004	Dreadhead Joe-Bob	Dreadnok Recruit	Winston P. Smith	Convention Exclusive
2004	Dreadhead Otis	Dreadnok Recruit	Theodore I. Smith	Convention Exclusive
2004	Dreadhead Roscoe	Dreadnok Recruit	Maximillian Q. Wesson	Convention Exclusive
2004	Dreadhead Vance	Dreadnok Recruit	Cornelius E. Smith	Convention Exclusive
2010	Storm Rider	Dreadnok	Unknown	Packaged with the Dreadnok "Doom Cycle".
2011	Zanya	Zartan's daughter	Zanya (real last name unknown)	Part of the "Dreadnok Battle Set" 7-pack

=== Iron Grenadiers ===
Year	Code Name	Function	Real Name	Notes
1983	Destro	Enemy Weapons Supplier	James McCullen Destro XXIV	
1988	Ferret	Iron Grenadier DEMON Drivers	Various	
1988	Iron Grenadiers	Destro's Elite Troopers	Various	
1988	Nullifier	Iron Grenadiers AGP Pilot	Various	
1988	Voltar	Destro's General	Unknown	KIA (vol. 1) #98 – Buried alive in Cobra Island Freighter by Cobra Commander.
1989	Annihilator	Destro's Elite Trooper	Various	
1989	Darklon	Iron Grenadier Evader Driver	Unknown	Presumed KIA (vol. 1) #146 – Presumed killed in a missile strike by Destro. Later discovered he had taken shelter in a bunker before the explosion.
1989	T.A.R.G.A.T.	Iron Grenadier Trans-Atmospheric Rapid Global Assault Trooper	Various	
1989	Wild Boar	Iron Grenadier Razorback Driver	Various	
1990	Metal-Head	Destro's Anti-Tank Specialist	Stuart A. Finley	
1990	Undertow	Destro's Frogmen	Various	
2005	General Mayhem	Iron Grenadiers General	Vladimir P. Mayhemovski	Convention Exclusive
2005	Iron Anvil	Iron Grenadiers Paratrooper	Various	Convention Exclusive
2007	Rowdy Roddy Piper	Iron Grenadier Trainer	Roderick George Toombs	Convention Exclusive. Based on wrestler Roddy Piper.
2008	Iron Grenadier Officer	Elite Officer	Unknown	TRU Exclusive (Iron Grenadier Command)
2009	M.A.R.S. Industries Officer	M.A.R.S. Industries Officer	Various	
2009	M.A.R.S. Industries Trooper	M.A.R.S. Industries Trooper	Various	
2009	M.A.R.S. Industries Weapons Officer	M.A.R.S. Industries Weapons Officer	Various	K-Mart Exclusive; part of the "G.I. Joe Versus Cobra" box set.
2012	Sergeant Major Duncan	Destro's Sergeant Major	Alistair Thomas Duncan	Convention Exclusive
2015	Undertow Officer	Iron Grenadiers Frogmen Commander	Azinza Solarin	Convention Exclusive
2015	M.A.R.S. Iron Anvil Officer	Iron Grenadiers Paratrooper	Various	Convention Exclusive

== Oktober Guard ==
Year	Code Name	Function	Real Name	Grade	Service Branch	Notes
1991	Red Star	Oktober Guard Officer	Anatoly Fydorovich Krimov	O-6 (equivalent)	Navy (Soviet/Russian)	
1992	Big Bear	Oktober Guard Anti-Armor Specialist	Grigori Ivanovich Rostoff / Viktor Piotr Debonov (only for France)	E-5 (equivalent)	Army (Soviet/Russian)	
1998	Colonel Brekhov	Oktober Guard Commander	Ivan Nikolevich Brekhov	O-6 (equivalent)	Army (Soviet/Russian)	KIA Special Missions #26 – Died in Sierra Gordo while attempting to save his friends and allies.
1998	Lt. Gorky	Oktober Guard Commando	Mikhail P. Gorky	O-1 (equivalent)	Navy (Soviet/Russian)	
1998	Volga (aka Daina)	Oktober Guard Weapons Expert	Daina L. Janack	O-1 (equivalent)	Army (Czechoslovakia/Czech Republic)	Code-named Vorona in the Devil's Due series
2005	Dragonsky	Oktober Guard Flamethrower	Andrei Freisov	E-8 (equivalent)	Army (Soviet/Russian)	Convention Exclusive
2005	Horrorshow	Oktober Guard Soldier	Stepan Drukersky	Unknown	Army (Soviet/Russian)	KIA Special Missions #26 – Died in Sierra Gordo while attempting to save his friends and allies.
2005	Schrage	Oktober Guard Soldier	(Classified)	Unknown	Army (East German)	KIA Special Missions #26 – Died in Sierra Gordo while attempting to save his friends and allies.
2005	Stormavik	Oktober Guard Soldier	(Classified)	Unknown	Army (Soviet/Russian)	KIA Special Missions #26 – Died in Sierra Gordo while attempting to save his friends and allies.
2006	Sgt. Misha Zubenkov	Oktober Guard Soldier	Misha L. Zubenkov	E-5 (equivalent)	Army (Soviet/Russian)	
2012	Iron Bear	Oktober Guard General	(Classified)	O-7 (equivalent)	Army (Soviet/Russian)	Convention/Web Exclusive

== See also ==
- Action Force
- G.I. Joe: America's movable fighting man
- List of G.I. Joe: A Real American Hero playsets
- List of G.I. Joe: A Real American Hero vehicles
