= G.I. Joe (comic books) =

Comics

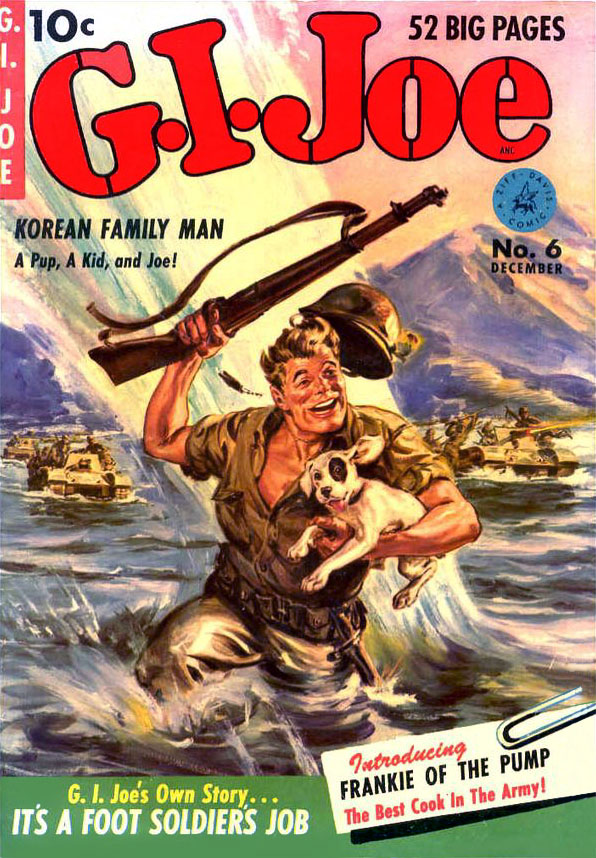
- G.I. Joe number 6, Dec. 1951 (Ziff Davis). Artwork by Norman Saunders.

Publication information
- Publisher: Marvel Comics (1982–1994); Dark Horse Comics (1996–1997); Devil's Due Publishing (2001–2008); Dreamwave Productions (2004); IDW Comics (2008–2022); Skybound Entertainment / Image Comics (2023–present)
- Schedule: Monthly
- Format: Ongoing series
- Genre: Science fiction
- Main character: G.I. Joe Team

G.I. Joe has been the title of comic book licensed by Hasbro, G.I. Joe from 1967 to present, with only two interruptions longer than a year (1977–1981, 1997–2000). As a team fighting Cobra since 1982, the comic book history of G.I. Joe: A Real American Hero has been covered by three separate publishers and four main-title series, all of which have been based on the Hasbro toy line of the same name.

The first series was produced by Marvel Comics between 1982 and 1994, running for 155 issues, and spawning several spin-off titles throughout the course of its run; the second and third series, published by Devil's Due Productions from 2001 to 2008, totaled 80 issues and included several spin-off titles as well. The fourth series has been published by IDW Publishing since October 2008, and various spin-off titles have also been launched.

== Custom Comics ==
In 1967, Hasbro released a single small comic book with its action figures titled America's Movable Fighting Man and produced by Custom Comics, Inc, an imprint of American Comics Group. Featuring illustrations by Kurt Schaffenberger.

In 1969, issues of a larger format comic with more elaborate stories were released with toys as The Adventures of G. I. Joe. From 1970 to 1976, Hasbro continued to reprint and publish new comics in-house as The G. I. Joe Adventure Team (see the Hasbro section).

== Comic book advertisement (1975-1976) ==
Between 1975 and 1976, Hasbro published comic book advertisements starring the Adventure Team, featuring the original G.I. Joe, Atomic Man and Bulletman as members.

== Marvel Comics ==
=== A Real American Hero (main series) ===
Hasbro relaunched their G.I. Joe franchise with G.I. Joe: A Real American Hero, which was supported by a Marvel Comics series of the same name. It was unique at the time in that it was a comic book series that was promoted on television commercials which also supported the toy line. This 155-issue series is considered to be one of the longest-running comic book tie-ins to a toy line. Much of its success is to be credited to Larry Hama, who wrote the entire series save for a few issues with guest writers. Rather than treating the stories as a mere promotion for the toys, Hama wrote the series with seriousness and infused it with doses of realism, humor, and drama. To keep the series up-to-date on military technology and terminology, Hama continuously read through technical manuals. Other than Transformers, no other series based on a toy line was able to duplicate its success. Other notable & recurring artists include Herb Trimpe, Ron Wagner, Rod Whigham, Mike Vosburg, Andrew Wildman, Phil Gosier, Chris Batista and Marshall Rogers.

A number of differences existed between the comic book and the animated TV series. Certain characters who were very prominent in the comic book, such as Stalker, were featured very little in the cartoon, while characters who were less prominent in the comic book, such as Shipwreck, were very prominent in the cartoon series. Another difference was that in the comic book featured a romance between Scarlett and Snake Eyes, whereas in the cartoon, she was paired with Duke. The most notable difference between the comic and the cartoon, however, is in its handling of combat. While the cartoon had the characters use semi-futuristic laser rifles and pistols (due to an edict for "no bullets" from the studio), the comic book did not shy away from using real-world pistols, rifles, SMGs and ammunition. The cartoon characters would almost comically wade through waves of enemy fire untouched, while the comic book would routinely have characters suffer injuries from bullets or shrapnel. The cartoon showed that nearly every soldier in every battle survived (for example, many shots of aircraft being shot down were shown to have its pilot escape in a parachute), while the comic did not shy away from character deaths; for example, issue #109 included the deaths of a large number of Joes, including fan-favorites like Doc, Breaker, and Quick-Kick, while other storylines included the deaths of Serpentor and Dr. Mindbender.

G.I. Joe: Order of Battle was a 4-issue mini series which ran from December 1986 - March 1987. Written by Larry Hama, with art by Herb Trimpe, the first issue spotlighted G.I. Joe characters with code names from A-K. Subsequent issues spotlighted G.I. Joe characters from M-Z, Cobra characters, and vehicles respectively. The second issue erroneously listed Sylvester Stallone's Rocky Balboa character as a member of G.I. Joe. While negotiations had taken place to license the character, the deal had fallen through. The third and fourth issues contained a retraction stating that Rocky Balboa was not and had never been a member of G.I. Joe. A trade-paperback including material from all four issues, was published in 1987, and removed mention of the Rocky character entirely.

=== G.I. Joe: Special Missions ===
The success of the main title lead Marvel Comics to produce a secondary title, G.I. Joe: Special Missions which lasted 28 issues. Herb Trimpe was the artist for nearly the entire run, with Dave Cockrum providing pencils on several issues. Spinning out of a story in issue #50 of the main title, the series featured more intense violence and more ambiguous morality than the main title, while the enemies were conventional terrorists as well as Cobra itself. The first four issues, as well as the backup story from issue #50 of the main title, were later republished as a trade paperback.

=== Reprints ===
The first 37 issues of the main series were released in thirteen digests titled G.I. Joe Comic Magazine.

Tales of G.I. Joe reprinted the first 15 issues of G.I. Joe on a higher quality paper stock than that used for the main comic.

Shortly after the final issue, a G.I. Joe Special #1 was released, with alternate art for issue #61 by Todd McFarlane. The cover features Snake Eyes in a crouched-down position, in a homage to the Spider-Man title that McFarlane illustrated during his tenure at Marvel.

In 2001, with the success of Devil's Due Comics run of G.I. Joe, Marvel Comics collected the first 50 issues in five trade paperbacks, with ten issues in each book. All covers for the trade paperbacks were drawn by J. Scott Campbell. The Marvel trades were heavily criticized due to printing errors, as the first three volume featured missing pages and pages published out of order. Production of the trade paperback series ultimately ended after the fifth volume, due to low sales and the fact that Marvel only had the original artwork and film negatives for the first 50 issues; further volumes would require tracking down and scanning the uncollected issues and remastering them for publication, which was deemed to be not cost effective given the poor sales of the books.

In 2009, IDW Publishing began to publish the series again. Called Classic G.I. Joe, the 15 volume trade paperback set collects all 155 issues (minus back-up features). The first five volumes use the same J. Scott Campbell covers as the Marvel trades (and correct printing errors found in the Marvel trades), volumes six through nine utilized Campbell's covers from the first 4 issues of the Devil Due series, and volumes ten through fifteen would ultimately feature new artwork commissioned for the trade paperbacks.

=== Foreign-language versions ===
G.I. Joe was published in a number of languages, sometimes by local publishers. Issues were translated into German, Spanish, Portuguese, Polish, French, French (Canada), Swedish, Norwegian, Finnish, Danish, Greek, Japanese, Arabic, Indonesian, and other languages.

=== Additional series ===
A four-issue limited series titled G.I. Joe and the Transformers teamed-up the Joes with the other popular Hasbro property of the 1980s, Transformers. Written by Michael Higgins, and with art by Herb Trimpe, set inside the continuity of both series, this was not acknowledged until the Transformers showed up in the main G.I. Joe comic years later. The final issue introduced the Transformers character Goldbug, who later appeared in the main The Transformers comic book series. A trade paperback later collected all four issues.

Action Force was the British counterpart to the 3 3/4-inch G.I. Joe toy line. The Action Force comic was launched by Marvel UK in 1987, tying into the previous Battle Action Force, and publishing original strips as well as modified reprints of the U.S. comic, with the team renamed "Action Force". The title lasted fifty issues before merging with Marvel UK's The Transformers in early 1988.

Later in 1988, a second series, Action Force Monthly, was launched due to Marvel UK's decision to produce comics in the American monthly format, and ran for fifteen issues before it was cancelled. The Action Force Monthly title was published in the U.S. as G.I. Joe: European Missions, which kept all of the dialogue from the UK version without attempting to incorporate the reprinted stories into the continuity of the U.S. G.I. Joe comic. The comic also included a tie-in story for the UK release of G.I. Joe: The Movie.

After the cancellation of Action Force Monthly, the U.S. G.I. Joe comic continued to be reprinted in Marvel UK's The Transformers comic as a back-up feature, with the dialogue kept intact, until it was dropped in 1991.

== Blackthorne Publishing ==
Blackthorne Publishing released six issues of G.I. Joe in 3-D and one annual. These issues were meant to be read with 3-D glasses. The stories didn't contradict the ongoing Marvel Comics series, but weren't considered canon.

Blackthorne also published three issues of How to Draw G.I. Joe, as part of their Official "How to Draw" series.

== Dark Horse Comics ==
In 1996, the G.I. Joe toy line was relaunched with the G.I. Joe Extreme series. Dark Horse Comics acquired the rights to publish comics based on the G.I. Joe Extreme property. The first series was a four-issue limited series written by Mike W. Barr and drawn by Tatsuya Ishida, which introduced the main characters. The ongoing G.I. Joe Extreme series that was launched afterward dropped the word "Extreme" from the title. The ongoing series lasted four issues before being canceled, although Dark Horse referred to the title as being on hiatus.

== Benchpress Comics ==
In the spring of 1999, Benchpress Comics announced the acquisition of the rights to produce new G.I. Joe and Transformers comics. The G.I. Joe project was to have included Larry Hama as writer. Benchpress's initial plan was to release two G.I. Joe titles; one would feature a core cast of characters (similar to the Marvel Comics series), while the other would have featured a rotating cast (similar in style to the Special Missions title). For unknown reasons, negotiations over hiring Larry Hama stalled, and Benchpress went bankrupt, losing the license in the process. Larry Hama's series proposal and the three sample pages of the comic that were produced are available online.

== Devil's Due Publishing ==
=== G.I. Joe: A Real American Hero (G.I. Joe Reinstated) ===
In July 2001, Devil's Due acquired the rights to G.I. Joe and released a four-issue limited series through Image Comics, written by Josh Blaylock with John Larter and Steve Kurth as the artists. The title quickly became known to the fans as A Real American Hero (vol. 2) (following from Marvel's original series), or G.I. Joe Reinstated (the title of the first four-issue arc). A comics convention special was released before the first issue. Strong sales on the limited series led to it being upgraded to an ongoing series, with the publication of a fifth issue and a monthly schedule.

The new series picked up seven years after the end of the Marvel Comics series, and also used elements from the animated TV series. Several older characters were featured in the title alongside several new recruits. Devil's Due later broke with Image Comics and took over the publishing of the book. The series ended with issue #43, and the introduction of a new enemy. Most G.I. Joe titles published by Devil's Due Publishing are available in both comic and trade paperback formats.

G.I. Joe: Battle Files gave profiles of the G.I. Joe and Cobra teams, as well as information on their vehicles. Battle Files was published between April and September 2002. A Sourcebook trade paperback was published in February 2003, which collected issues one through three with additional profiles added.

G.I. Joe: Frontline lasted eighteen issues, and featured a rotating creative team for every story. The stories explored what happened to G.I. Joe and Cobra concurrently with the main title's continuity, with the exception of the first arc. Larry Hama wrote Frontline's initial offering, "The Mission That Never Was", a four-part series set one month after the events of the Marvel series' issue #155.

There were two four-issue limited series titled G.I. Joe: Master and Apprentice, written by Brandon Jerwa. The first series was about how Snake Eyes met and trained his apprentice Kamakura, while the second series focused on Storm Shadow and his apprentice/lover Junko Akita.

A single digest titled Arashikage Showdown featured Snake Eyes, Storm Shadow, Jinx, Scarlett, Kamakura, T'Jbang, Nunchuk and Budo. The martial arts experts try to recover the secret scrolls of the Arashikage Ninja Clan, to which several of them belong. This book has been considered to be non-canon by fans, as it incorporates magical and fantasy elements not present in the main series.

=== G.I. Joe: America's Elite ===
G.I. Joe: America's Elite (officially entitled G.I. Joe Volume 2 on the inside cover), started with a "zero" issue, and picked up the story one year after the events of the last issue of G.I. Joe: A Real American Hero (vol. 2). The series featured a darker tone and a smaller group of Joes than in Reinstated. The series started off with the president asking General Joseph Colton, the original G.I. Joe, to be the team's C.O., replacing General Hawk, who was paralyzed in the previous series. Character profiles were provided in the Data Desk Handbook, as well as in individual issues. Joe Casey wrote the first eighteen issues before editor Mike O'Sullivan wrote issues #19 and 20. Mark Powers and Mike Bear became the current writer and penciller on the book with #21. The twelve issue "World War III" story arc ran from issue #25 to #36. The series concluded in July 2008 with issue #36, after Devil's Due lost the G.I. Joe license.

An original one-shot titled Data Desk Handbook published files for G.I. Joe: America's Elite main characters at the launch of the series. The files are presented as computer entries written by General Joseph Colton. Several other files were later published in individual issues of America's Elite, Special Missions and several trade paperback volumes. An updated version in two issues (A-M and N-Z) was released in October and November 2007.

The one-shot issue The Hunt for Cobra Commander was set in the year between the Devil's Due A Real American Hero series and America's Elite series, and featured G.I. Joe team member Spirit.

==== Storm Shadow ====
Storm Shadow, written by Larry Hama, lasted seven issues and focused on former Cobra and G.I. Joe team member Storm Shadow. The series began in May 2007, and, while not bearing the "America's Elite" subtitle, the events occurred in the same time frame as the main series.

==== Special Missions ====
Special Missions was a series of one-shots featuring reservist Joes, and set in different parts of the world. The series bore the subtitle America's Elite.

- Manhattan - This one-shot featured G.I. Joe reservists Beach Head, Cover Girl, Mercer, Low-Light and Tunnel Rat, on a special mission involving a bio-weapon threat in New York City.
- Tokyo - This one-shot features the ninja Jinx and samurai Budo, with reservists Wild Bill, Gung Ho, Clutch and Rock N' Roll, who try to prevent a coup in Japan.
- Antarctica - This one-shot features Snake Eyes, Stalker, Duke and Scarlett, as well as reservists Snow Job, Frostbite and Iceberg.
- Brazil - This one-shot features characters that came with the 1986 G.I. Joe Special Missions Brazil Toys R Us exclusive boxed set, who go up against the Headman and his drug-dealing organization.
- The Enemy - This one-shot contrasts the motivations of original G.I. Joe infantryman Grunt with those of an unnamed Cobra "Blueshirt" trooper, with a backup tale about the mission where Cobra forces abduct the Baroness' child.

==== Declassified ====
The various Declassified series and one-shots explore the origins of the characters, and are set before #1 of Marvel's G.I. Joe series.

- Snake Eyes: Declassified - A six-issue limited series written by Brandon Jerwa and set before Marvel Comics' G.I. Joe #1, retelling and expanding the story of Snake Eyes.
- Scarlett: Declassified - A double-sized one-shot issue telling the history of the character code-named Scarlett (Shana O'Hara), set between Snake Eyes Declassified and G.I. Joe Declassified.
- G.I. Joe: Declassified - This series of three double-sized issues, written by Larry Hama, was released bi-monthly beginning in the Summer of 2006. The story is set between Scarlett Declassified and issue #1 of the original Marvel Comics series, telling the first missions of the original thirteen members of the team.
- Dreadnoks: Declassified - A limited series of three double-sized issues written by Josh Blaylock, telling the complete origin story of Zartan, including how he gained his abilities.

=== Alternate universes ===
DDP also published comics in three alternate continuities.

==== G.I. Joe vs. the Transformers ====
G.I. Joe vs. the Transformers was a series of cross-productions with Dreamwave Productions, who, at the time of publication, held the license to create Transformers comics. Each studio released their own six-issue mini-series, which featured their own take on a crossover between the two franchises. Unlike previous efforts to bring the two properties together, the Devil's Due story takes place in an alternate present day, where Cobra, just rising to prominence, has uncovered the Ark. Cobra steals the Transformers found inside, such as Optimus Prime, Ironhide, and Ratchet, and adapt them into Cobra assault vehicles such as Cobra H.I.S.S. tanks. G.I. Joe is formed to stop Cobra, and receive unexpected help from Wheeljack and Bumblebee, who managed to avoid being taken by Cobra. A trade paperback collected all six issues in March 2004.

The second mini-series was a sequel to the first story. Cybertronian technology has augmented both G.I. Joe and Cobra's forces, who are still fighting each other. During a battle, an accident causes several Joes and members of Cobra to be accidentally transported to Cybertron. The backlash of the accident also pulls several Transformers to Earth, as well as scattering them through time. The Joes and Cobra must travel into the past and future, to retrieve the missing Autobots and Decepticons before the Earth is destroyed. This is complicated by the fact that most of Cybertron is under the control of the Decepticon Shockwave. A trade paperback collected all four issues in April 2005.

The third mini-series, entitled The Art of War, followed on from the second mini-series, using elements of the first. The new story focused on a re-imagined version of Serpentor, in this continuity a cyborg created from the DNA of great war leaders, and the mechanical components of Megatron. Inadvertently freed by a Cobra raid, Serpentor journeyed to Cybertron. Now Hawk, Grimlock and the other Autobots and Joes must stop him before he takes the Autobot Matrix of Leadership for himself. A trade paperback collected all five issues in August 2006.

A fourth mini-series consisting of two double-sized issues, entitled Black Horizon, was released in early 2007. After Hawk resigned from G.I. Joe in the wake of the events of "The Art of War", he formed a loose alliance with the Autobots to stop the spread of Cybertronian technology. However, a much bigger threat looms: the serpent cult Cobra-La and the dark god of the Transformers Unicron. Hawk, Flint, and Optimus Prime go the Himalayas to confront Cobra-La, and find a long lost hero: Joe Colton, the original G.I. Joe.

==== G.I. Joe: Reloaded ====
G.I. Joe: Reloaded was a fourteen-issue ongoing series published by Devil's Due which was set in an alternate universe, and featured a more realistic take on the G.I. Joe franchise. The ongoing series was preceded by the Cobra Reborn and G.I. Joe Reborn one-shots, which introduced the main characters and showed the formation of G.I. Joe and the Cobra Organization.

In this universe, Snake Eyes is Storm Shadow's half-brother and a former Cobra agent. Carla "Doc" Greer (an alternative version of the character Carl "Doc" Greer from the main continuity), is G.I. Joe's field medic, and Duke is an undercover Cobra agent who betrays the group. The series had no connection to the main comic series and was canceled after fourteen issues due to low sales. A trade paperback titled G.I. Joe: Reloaded - In The Name of Patriotism collected the first six issues in November 2004.

==== G.I. Joe: Sigma 6 ====
G.I. Joe: Sigma 6 was a six-issue mini-series written for a younger audience, based on the toyline and animated TV series of the same name. While the series was out of continuity with the main comic universe, the characters are largely the same: Hawk is the commanding officer, Duke is the field leader, and there is a connection between the ninjas Snake Eyes and Storm Shadow. A trade paperback collected all six issues in October 2006.

== IDW Publishing ==
After Devil's Due lost the G.I. Joe comics license in January 2008, the license was given to IDW Publishing, which was officially announced on May 29. IDW's G.I. Joe series is a complete reboot of the property, ignoring the continuity from the Marvel and Devil's Due incarnations of the comic. They lost the right to publish G.I Joe comics at the end of 2022.

=== G.I. Joe ===
Issue #0 was released in October 2008, containing three stand-alone stories which acted as previews for the main G.I. Joe series, the G.I. Joe: Origins and G.I. Joe: Cobra spin-off mini-series. The #0 issue is followed by an ongoing monthly G.I. Joe series, written by Chuck Dixon, and drawn by Robert Atkins, which started in January 2009. After issue #27, the series was rebooted in April 2011 with a new #0.

G.I. Joe: Origins was an ongoing series that started in February 2009, and ended with issue #23 in January 2011. The first five issues, written by Larry Hama with art by Tom Feister and Mike Hawthorne, focus on the formation of the G.I. Joe team several years before the events of the main series. After this story arc, rotating creative teams - featuring creators such as JT Krul, Joe Benitez, Marc Andreyko and Ben Templesmith - took over the title to focus on origin and background tales of individual Joe and Cobra operatives.

G.I. Joe: Cobra, co-written by Christos Gage and Mike Costa and drawn by Antonio Fuso, was a four-issue mini-series that started in March 2009 and focused on the inner working of the Cobra Organization as viewed through the eyes of undercover G.I. Joe agent Chuckles. By the end of the series, Chuckles is forced to kill his handler, Jinx, and loses contact with his Joe superiors. A G.I. Joe Cobra II mini-series began in January 2010, picking up with General Hawk recruiting a new—also female and Japanese—soldier to recover Chuckles. It was later upgraded to an ongoing series that ended in February 2011 with issue #13. A new #1 was scheduled for May 2011.

G.I. Joe: Special is a series of one-shot issues focusing on different characters. So far, only a Helix Special was published in August 2009.

G.I. Joe: Cobra: Special is a series of one-shot issues focusing on different Cobra characters. So far, two issues were published: #1 was published in September 2009 focusing on the Crimson Twins and #2 focused on Chameleon.

G.I. Joe: Hearts & Minds is a five-issue limited series written by Max Brooks. Each issue includes two short stories, one on a member of G.I. Joe, one on a member of Cobra.

=== G.I. Joe: The Rise of Cobra ===
- G.I. Joe Movie Prequel – A four-part limited series written by Chuck Dixon, acting as a prequel to the 2009 movie G.I. Joe: The Rise of Cobra. Published from March 2009 to June 2009, each issue featured a different character from the movie (Duke, Destro, The Baroness and Snake Eyes respectively).
- G.I. Joe Movie Adaptation – A four-part limited series published in July 2009 and written by Chuck Dixon, adapting the 2009 movie.
- G.I. Joe: Snake Eyes – A Snake Eyes solo limited series co-written by Ray Park (October 2009 - January 2010).
- EA/Game Stop comic – A comic distributed through Game Stop retail stores that bridges the gap between the movie and the EA video game that followed.
- G.I. Joe: Operation HISS – A five-issue limited series, serving as a sequel of sorts to the 2009 movie, that was published from February 2010 to June 2010. The first issue is a reprint of the EA/Game Stop comic.

=== G.I. Joe: A Real American Hero ===
The G.I. Joe: A Real American Hero series, originally published by Marvel Comics in the 1980s and 1990s, was revived as an ongoing series in May 2010 with a special #155 1/2 issue, released on Free Comic Book Day, and followed by #156 onward in July. Hasbro said it had no opinion on whether this made Devil's Due comics noncanonical:

We have no official stance on the Devil's Due material. It can be viewed as a continuation of the 80's continuity, or as an alternate universe that was inspired by the 80's continuity. Fans can read it according to their personal preference, but we are currently taking the brand in a direction that does not take the Devil's Due story into account.

Original writer Larry Hama resumed his role as writer, joined by artist Agustin Padilla for the first story arc and then S.L. Gallant, who was the regular artist until 2017. Veteran Joe artists Herb Trimpe, Rod Whigham and Ron Wagner have contributed cover art since the book's relaunch (with Wagner also providing interior art), as well as artists Ron Frenz and Sal Buscema (who also illustrated interiors of the 2012 annual), Antonio Fuso, Tommy Lee Edwards and John Royle. Other notable & recurring artists during this IDW revival series include Netho Diaz, Brian Shearer, Ron Joseph and Robert Atkins.

=== IDW reprints ===
IDW began printing trade paperback collections of the original Marvel Comics series starting in January 2009. The reprints, begun by Marvel Comics years earlier but abandoned with Volume 5, contain ten issues each retaining the originals in full color. The 5 Marvel volumes were also reprinted by IDW.

IDW also reprinted the entirety of the Devil's Due G.I. Joe run, under a "Disavowed" banner (acknowledging the non-canonical status of the DDP comics): 7 trade paperback collections of the original DDP series, as well as 6 collections of the America's Elite series.

=== Crossovers ===
In 2016, IDW published a crossover between Capcom's Street Fighter and G.I. Joe titled Street Fighter x G.I. Joe. It was written by Aubrey Sitterson with art by Emilio Laiso, and ran for six issues.

== Skybound Entertainment ==
=== Energon Universe ===
Title	Issue(s)	Creative team			Release schedule		Ref.
Title	Issue(s)	Writer(s)	Artist(s)	Colorist(s)	Premiere date	Finale date	Ref.
Duke	1–	Joshua Williamson	Tom Reilly	Jordie Bellaire	December 27, 2023	TBA	
Cobra Commander	1–	Joshua Williamson	Andrea Milana	Annalisa Leoni	January 17, 2024	TBA	

=== G.I. Joe: A Real American Hero ===
Title	Issue(s)	Creative team			Release schedule		Ref.
Title	Issue(s)	Writer(s)	Artist(s)	Colorist(s)	Premiere date	Finale date	Ref.
G.I. Joe: A Real American Hero	301–	Larry Hama	Chris Mooneyham	Francesco Segala	November 14, 2023	TBA	
G.I. Joe: A Real American Hero #1 Larry Hama Cut	One-shot	Larry Hama	Herb Trimpe; Bob McLeod	Glynis Wein	January 17, 2024		

== Hasbro Comics ==
Also see the Custom Comics section above

=== Minicomics ===
Sgt. Savage vs. Gen. Blitz - a two-part mini-comic released in 1994 as a tie-in to the Sgt. Savage and his Screaming Eagles illustrated by veteran Joe Kubert.

=== Marvel/Devil's Due Universe ===
- Action Stars' Starduster mini-comics - Three out-of-continuity mini-comics packed in Action Stars cereals (1985) featuring original character Starduster.
- Super Trooper - A two-page comic strip relating an adventure with character Super Trooper was available with action figures sold in 1988. This character was never used in the Marvel incarnation, but the story didn't contradict the Marvel continuity.
- Battle Corps mini-comics - Four Larry Hama-written mini-comics sold with Battle Corps figures in 1992. While the stories don't contradict the Marvel continuity, they were never referenced in the Marvel incarnation.
- Full size comic 2-packs - Twelve Larry Hama-written comics have been released in 2008. They loosely fit into the original Marvel-published continuity. These comics are sold packed with two figures each.

=== Reprints of Marvel and DDP stories ===
Hasbro has reprinted 24 Marvel-published comics, and one of Devil's Due's issues (vol 1., #16), was packaged with either three-packs of figures (featuring the original comic covers) or, later, two-packs (featuring homage cover artwork). Marvel issues #1, #14, #21, #24, #25, #30, #64, #86, and #115 were reprinted with homage cover, while issues #1-9, #21, #24, #26, #44, #49, #74-76, & #101, and Devil's Due #16, were reprinted with their original covers. Issue one was also reprinted with a convention-special cover in a repackaging of the issue #1 three-pack.

=== Resolute universe ===
Two issues have been released in 2009, based on the G.I. Joe Resolute cartoon and action figures. The first comic 2-packs contained Shockblast paired with Destro, and Tunnel Rat paired with Storm Shadow. Issue 3 Cold Comfort was never released. Issue 4 Who Owns the Night was available through Walmart.com upon order. Issue 5 Final Test was available as a download on Amazon.com upon order of the Resolute DVD. Issue 6 Splash-Bang was available as a mail-in on Amazon.com upon order. Note that issues 4 and 6 did not bare the Resolute subtitle on their covers. The entire series was written by Larry Hama.

=== Other universes ===
The Spy Troops, Valor vs. Venom, Ninja Battles and Sigma 6 storylines are considered part of the same universe, though some contradictions exist between the first three and Sigma 6.

- Spy-Troops and Valor vs Venom - Ten mini-comics written by Larry Hama, one mini-comic written by Devil's Due. Hama's issues #7 and 8 were reprinted as a full size comic entitled "Dawn of the V-troops".
- Ninja Battles - One full-size issue written by Devil's Due.
- Sigma 6 mini-comic - An abbreviated version of Devils' Due Sigma 6 issue #1 was sold along with the Ninja paratrooper Snake Eyes toy.
- Kung Fu Grip - Two issues written by Andrew Dabb ("Heavy Metal" and "A Ghost Story"), are available online on Hasbro's G.I. Joe website. The stories fall under the Sigma 6 line.

== Tokyopop ==
In 2003, Tokyopop adapted the Spy Troops direct-to-DVD movie with G.I. Joe: Spy Troops Cine-Manga, by using screen captures from the animation and adding word balloons.

== FP Comics ==
The G.I. Joe Collector's Club Comics released under the FP label are not set in any specific Joe universe:

- Convention exclusives (main series) - In 2008, a G.I. Joe convention exclusive comic book was released. Written by Larry Hama, based on a story by David S. Lane, it featured the Joes' SWAT team against Gristle and the Headhunters. A second issue by Lane was released in 2009.
- Direct-to-Cobra - A series consisting of two issues.

== Panini Comics ==
Panini Comics released a six-issue series in the UK to tie in with the 2009 theatrical release of G.I. Joe: The Rise of Cobra. The title featured original 14-page comic strips.

== Power Comics, Inc. ==
In March 2023, Power Comics, Inc. announces its partnership with Super Joe Unlimited to publish a Super Joe comic book (1977).

== See also ==
- G.I. Joe
- G.I. Joe Team
- Cobra Command
- List of G.I. Joe: A Real American Hero action figures
