= Jinx (G.I. Joe) =

Character from the G.I. Joe franchise

- G.I. Joe character
- Illustration of Jinx for a G.I. Joe: Battleground card, based on her original action figure.
- First appearance: G.I. Joe: A Real American Hero issue #59 (May 1987)
- Voiced by: Shuko Akune (The Movie); Venus Terzo (Valor Vs. Venom, Ninja Battles); Lisa Ortiz (Sigma 6); Kim Mai Guest (Renegades)

In-universe information
- Affiliation: G.I. Joe
- Specialty: Ninja/Intelligence (1987); Covert Infiltration Specialist (2004)
- File name: TOP SECRET (1987); Classified (2004); Kim Arashikage (2012)
- Birth place: Los Angeles, California
- SN: 037-42-4683 (1987); 037-42-UK83 (2003); Classified (2004)
- Rank: E-5 (Sergeant)
- Primary MOS: Intelligence
- Secondary MOS: Finance Clerk
- Subgroups: Ninja Force (1992); Tiger Force (2003)

Jinx is a fictional character from the G.I. Joe: A Real American Hero toyline, comic books and animated series. She debuted in 1987 as the G.I. Joe Team's female ninja, and since then her code name has been the identity of several other incarnations of the same character, including one of Snake Eyes' apprentices in G.I. Joe: Sigma 6, Chuckles' undercover contact in G.I. Joe: Cobra, and Storm Shadow's cousin in G.I. Joe: Renegades. She is portrayed by Élodie Yung in the 2013 film G.I. Joe: Retaliation.

== Character biography ==
In G.I. Joe: A Real American Hero, Jinx is one of the few G.I. Joe Team members whose real name is top secret. She has been studying and competing in several forms of martial arts since she was seven. She grew up in Los Angeles and is a Bryn Mawr graduate. On a vacation trip to Japan, Jinx discovered her familial ties to a ninja clan known as the Arashikage, and was officially initiated into the clan. She was then recruited by Snake Eyes, a fellow ninja and member of the G.I. Joe Team. Jinx has since undergone training with the Blind Master, a ranking ninja sensei, and studied the seven silent forms, including the "Eye That Pierces", the "Iron Hand" and the "Heart That Waits".

After the temporary dissolution of the G.I. Joe Team, Jinx became a freelance agent, and is believed to have spent time serving in the CIA. She also started a romantic relationship with her teammate Budo, and the two of them formed a successful bounty hunting business together. When the team was reinstated, Jinx returned to help train new recruits in hand-to-hand combat.

== Merchandising ==
G.I. Joe: Battleground card illustration of Jinx, based on her 2013 exclusive action figure.

Jinx was first released as an action figure in the 1987 edition of the G.I. Joe: A Real American Hero toyline. Like many of the female G.I. Joe characters, Jinx has had a relatively small number of action figures produced. As of 2011, she has had one 3 3/4-inch figure named Jinx, and two 3 3/4-inch figures named "Agent Jinx". The first of these was released in 2003 as a member of Tiger Force, and the second ("Covert Infiltration Specialist") released in 2004 actually reveals her face, but her real name is still classified.

In 2011, a new Jinx figure was announced for the exclusive pre-release by the official G.I. Joe Collectors' Club. Two new 3 3/4-inch figures of "Kim Arashikage" were announced to be released in the G.I. Joe: Retaliation 2012 Movie Line exclusively at San Diego Comic-Con in 2012: an updated version in a red ninja suit, and an unmasked variant of her wearing a white costume and wielding a kusarigama. In 2013, a Kim Arashikage figure was released with a red outfit as a G.I. Joe Collectors' Club exclusive. Another Kim Arashikage figure was released the same year as part of the G.I. Joe: Retaliation line, outfitted in her black-and-yellow ninja outfit from the live-action film. A Jinx figure was also released in the Kre-O G.I. Joe line in 2013.

== Comics ==
=== Marvel Comics ===
In the Marvel Comics G.I. Joe: A Real American Hero series, Jinx first appears in issue #59. Her first assignment is to train Cobra Commander's son Billy Kessler in San Francisco. She later helps rescue the captured Joes from Borovia's gulags. In subsequent appearances, she helps the Joes clear their name in the scandal that follows the Cobra Civil War. This involves working with ex-Joes like Grunt, as well as other Joes who are officially fugitives such as Roadblock, and eventually the entire Joe team raids an enemy-filled hospital to save the lives of General Hawk and General Hollingsworth. Jinx also appears in some of the Special Mission specials, such as when she helps to stop a hostage situation in Frankfurt. Jinx eventually becomes a member of the G.I. Joe special team Ninja Force. After fighting together with Storm Shadow against Zartan in San Francisco, Jinx and Scarlett are injured during a battle against the rival Red Ninjas. Later, Jinx and her fellow Ninja Force teammates T'Jbang and Nunchuk set up a new training center in Spanish Harlem. She continued serving in Ninja Force until G.I. Joe was disbanded.

=== Devil's Due Publishing ===
In the first four issues of the G.I. Joe: A Real American Hero comics published by Devil's Due, it is revealed that she spent the years that followed using her skills in intelligence-gathering to become a bounty hunter in Tokyo. A samurai and fellow Joe teammate Budo followed her and they became lovers. Jinx then rejoins G.I. Joe, when the team is reinstated to battle a revived Cobra. During the initial conflict, Duke leads a team with Jinx, Flint, Rock 'n Roll and Shipwreck to defend Washington D.C. against Cobra's forces. Later, she spies on a group of Dreadnoks attempting to purchase a nuclear weapon. She works with several other Joes, such as Heavy Duty and Lady Jaye to try to bring down an out-of-control Battle Android Trooper. Jinx also trains new recruits, and goes on a mission to Seattle. Later, she is part of an infiltration team sent in to sabotage Cobra Island during the second Cobra Civil War. Two members of her team, Flash and Mainframe, die during the mission. Jinx and T'Jbang are injured in a battle with the Red Ninjas in Tibet. When G.I. Joe commander Hawk is shot by Zartan, the team is disbanded once more.

After some time, the G.I. Joe team reforms with a much smaller group of specialists called "America's Elite" (G.I. Joe: America's Elite). Jinx serves as a member of the reserves. She stars in Special Missions: Tokyo, a one-shot comic focusing on many characters not seen since the end of the original series, including Wild Bill, Gung-Ho, Clutch, Rock 'n Roll, and Budo. Her profile in the comic reveals her name to be Kimi Arashikage, cousin of Tommy Arashikage (Storm Shadow). However, it states that "Kimi" might be just a nickname. Jinx is called again into active duty to fight off Cobra Commander's worldwide assault during World War III. She and Budo join Kamakura, Bullhorn, Red Spot, and Nunchuk in battling Cobra forces in China. After Cobra is defeated, Jinx, Budo, and Kamakura join in celebrations taking place in Beijing.

Jinx also appears in the comic specials G.I. Joe: Arashikage Showdown, and Snake Eyes: Declassified, as well as in ninja-themed miniseries G.I. Joe: Master & Apprentice, and G.I. Joe: Master & Apprentice II. She makes a cameo in the crossover miniseries G.I. Joe vs. the Transformers II. Hasbro later announced that all stories published by Devil's Due Publishing are no longer considered canonical, and are now considered an alternate continuity.

=== IDW Publishing ===
In the continuation of the A Real American Hero storyline by IDW Publishing, Jinx is sent on her own special mission to Bern, where she tests her new skills and defeats the Blue Ninjas. Later Jinx, Chuckles, Low Light and Lady Jaye go to fight Generalissimo Tep in South-East Asia, where Jinx rescues Lady Jaye from captivity. Jinx is teamed with the Arashikage ninja Pale Peony, with whom she is sent on undercover missions against the Blue Ninjas and their cyborgs. She is in turn herself rescued by Roadblock, Scarlett, and Snake Eyes in Dublin, and helps to avenge the death of Pale Peony. Following the purported death of Snake Eyes, Jinx reunites with Storm Shadow at the Arashikage compound. She later works with Scarlett, investigating the office building that was a former Cobra Headquarters.

In the G.I. Joe: Cobra miniseries, Jinx is a Chinese-American woman who is Chuckles' only contact with G.I. Joe, and also his romantic interest, as he infiltrates the Cobra organization. When he gets deeper inside Cobra, she is forced to cut off her meetings with him. However, when Cobra catches Jinx at one of their facilities, Chuckles is called in. And when they discover she has been following him, he is forced to shoot her in order to preserve his cover. The sequel G.I. Joe: Cobra II, features a new recruit who is a Jinx lookalike, sent on a mission to rescue Chuckles, and later revealed to be a Japanese ninja named Chameleon. Chuckles later avenges Jinx's death, destroying Cobra headquarters and killing thousands of Cobra soldiers and commanders including Xamot.

Jinx appears in the Danger Girl crossover miniseries Danger Girl/G.I. Joe. Jinx is also a major character in the Transformers crossover series, Transformers vs. G.I. Joe. In the Future Noir series comic "Deviations", Jinx is one of the last four Joes remaining alive after Cobra takes over the world, and dies while destroying Cobra Island. In the Street Fighter crossover series Street Fighter X G.I. Joe, Jinx plays a leading role, as she trains with and defeats Ryu, and then defeats Rufus. Eventually, she fights in the final duel against M. Bison, whom she also beats, thus winning the World Warrior tournament.

=== Other comics ===
Jinx appears as one of the main characters in the Blackthorne Publishing series G.I. Joe In 3-D. She and Snake Eyes star in Hasbro's standalone comics, such as The Secret Base, Ninja Battles, and Who Owns the Night? Jinx also appears in major roles in some of Fun Publications' comics that are a part of the Devil's Due Publishing continuity. In alternate universe, Jink and Stalker try to recruit the otherwise peaceful Dreadnok enclave. The two sides manage a reluctant partnership over common goals; survival.

== Animated series ==
=== Sunbow ===
Jinx's only appearance in the Sunbow canon was in the 1987 animated film G.I. Joe: The Movie, voiced by Shuko Akune. She is established as a member of the "Rawhides", a group of new Joe recruits including Big Lob, Chuckles, Law & Order and Tunnel Rat, trained by Beach Head. The film plays on her code name in a literal sense, as she is often blamed for unlucky occurrences. Jinx is depicted as fighting best when blindfolded, as she was trained in this method by the Blind Master, as opposed to the practice Beach Head tries to teach her. She is also the love interest of Lt. Falcon, who flirts with her, much to her annoyance. Jinx is featured prominently in the climax, when she hotwires a Tomahawk so the Rawhides can aid the Joes in combat, and later squares off against Cobra-La villainess Pythona. Jinx gains the upper hand when she puts her blindfold on, helping her defeat Pythona. At the end of the film, Jinx shares a kiss with Falcon and they watch as the remains of Cobra-La's mutation spores in the sky are burning in orbit.

=== Valor vs. Venom ===
Jinx returns in the 2004 direct-to-video animated film G.I. Joe: Valor vs. Venom, voiced by Venus Terzo. Her original background with the Blind Master is not mentioned, instead she is training along with Kamakura under Snake Eyes, and likes to rib Kamakura for his lesser experience. Because of the nature of the movie, it is hard to determine if she is an apprentice for the first time, or is learning a new level of skills, as she does seem to be a very seasoned ninja.

=== Ninja Battles ===
In the 2004 animated feature G.I. Joe: Ninja Battles, Venus Terzo reprises her role as Jinx. Set in the same continuity as Valor Vs. Venom, Jinx and Kamakura assists Snake Eyes, Duke, and new apprentice Tiger Claw in a battle against Storm Shadow and the Cobra ninjas Slice, Slash, and Shadow Strike, at the forge of Arashikage Clan swordsmith Iron Master.

=== Sigma 6 ===
In the 2005 anime series G.I. Joe: Sigma 6, Jinx is voiced by Lisa Ortiz. A reserve member of the young Sigma 6 team, she maintains a similar appearance to her Valor vs. Venom incarnation, with a black and yellow Sigma suit. It is more apparent in the series that she is an elder student over Kamakura, whom she is often partnered with.

=== Renegades ===
A different version of Jinx appears in the 2010 animated series G.I. Joe: Renegades, voiced by Kim Mai Guest. The daughter of Arashikage clan leader Hard Master and cousin to Storm Shadow, Kimi Arashikage was rescued by Snake Eyes at the age of eight, and was an instrumental part of Hard Master adopting a moral path for the clan when she protected Snake Eyes from her father's punishment. When Hard Master was killed, Snake Eyes and Kimi left the clan to a dojo in the mountains. She became Snake Eyes' apprentice and took the name of "Jinx", thinking she brought bad luck to those around her.

Snake Eyes takes the Joes to his dojo to train them. Upon arriving, Jinx suddenly attacks them until she is called off by Snake Eyes. She assists him in training them. Though Jinx is at odds with the Joes (especially Scarlett, as Snake Eyes seemed to treat her with extra care), they put aside their differences when Storm Shadow ambushes them. Storm Shadow tries to force Jinx to go back to Japan and lead the Arashikage with him, and attacks her when she refuses, before Snake Eyes comes to her aid.

After Storm Shadow tells her how Snake Eyes murdered her father, as he believed it to have occurred, Jinx returns to Japan to assume her role as the Arashikage's leader. Later, Jinx is hired by Destro to assassinate Cobra Commander, receiving a MARS high-tech suit with optical camouflage and force field. Not going through with the mission, Jinx eventually learns the true story behind her father's death, and resolves to lead the Arashikage down the new path that the Hard Master wanted.

== Live action film ==
Jinx
- G.I. Joe character
- First appearance: 2013
- Portrayed by: Élodie Yung

In-universe information
- Affiliation: G.I. Joe
- File name: Kim Arashikage
- Series: G.I. Joe: Retaliation

In June 2011, Cambodian French actress Élodie Yung was cast as Jinx for the 2013 film G.I. Joe: Retaliation. Jinx was featured in the first promotional pictures and trailer, shown sparring against Snake Eyes while clad in red and blindfolded, and fighting together with him against the Red Ninjas while wearing a yellow suit. Yung, who already owned a black belt in karate, prepared for about a month for the role, focusing on her cardio "because of how demanding it all was", and training in the Chinese martial art wushu for dual sword fighting. The cliff battle scene required two months of green screen work to be done. Yung also said: "I was wearing a yellow costume that got pretty hot. It looks sexy, but I needed five people to get into that suit." According to MTV, "the totally silent mountainside battle between Snake Eyes, Jinx and a squad of Cobra ninjas mirrors the similarly silent comic book issue in the original Marvel series, which depicts Snake Eyes rescuing Scarlett from a Cobra castle in the Balkans."

In Retaliation, Jinx is Storm Shadow's cousin, and the apprentice of Snake Eyes. She meets with Snake Eyes when the latter is pursuing Storm Shadow. Snake Eyes and Jinx return to the home of the Arashikage Clan, where Jinx is put to a test to prove herself worthy to join the G.I. Joe Team; in the trial, she must defend herself while blindfolded from Snake Eyes, who will try to take a hair from her head. Snake Eyes defeats Jinx. The Blind Master, leader of the Arashikage Clan, sends Snake Eyes and Jinx to locate Storm Shadow, so he can answer for the murder of the Hard Master. Snake Eyes and Jinx capture Storm Shadow after a battle with the Red Ninjas at a mountain fortress, and take him back to Japan, where Storm Shadow reveals that Zartan murdered the Hard Master, and that he joined Cobra to avenge his uncle. Storm Shadow then accompanies Snake Eyes and Jinx, as they join the Joes' efforts to stop Cobra. Jinx helps G.I. Joe fight Cobra's soldiers, but Cobra Commander escapes during the battle, and Storm Shadow disappears after avenging the Hard Master. Jinx is then recruited into the G.I. Joe.

Ray Park, who played Snake Eyes in the film, said that the relationship between Jinx and his character is strictly platonic. Yung said about her character: "Jinx wants to fight and she has an objective, and she's fiery [laughs]. Whoever is in her way is not a problem to her, she's so focused and she just wants to get straight to the point. And with Snake Eyes, he's such a strong inspiration for Jinx. We trained in the same dojo and he's become an icon, he's a role model. He's Snake Eyes, he's the coolest, he's the best, and Jinx wants to compete with him, you know? In the test that they have in the beginning she wants to win and she wants to prove that she wants to be better, or at least as good as him. There is a kind of a brother and sister relationship that we tried to instill during the film."

== In other media ==
Jinx is a supporting character in the 1988 novels Divide and Conquer, where she is part of the Joe team trying to stop Cobra's newest weapon, a device that could endanger the entire world, and Jungle Raid, where she is part of a team ordered to stop a rebel mercenary force in the steaming jungles of South America. In video games, Jinx was one of the 15 playable characters (and the first one to be revealed) in the 2013 Facebook game G.I. Joe: Special Ops by Syfy Games, and was also a recruitable soldier in the 2013 mobile game G.I. Joe: Battleground by DeNA.

== Reception ==
Mania.com ranked Jinx as fourth on their 2012 list of "10 Badass Female G.I. Joe Characters", after Scarlett, Baroness, and Lady Jaye. Topless Robot ranked her as third on their 2010 list of "The 10 Coolest G.I. Joe Ninjas", behind only Snake Eyes and Storm Shadow. UGO.com also featured Jinx in the article "25 Hot Ninja Girls", and noted her as "one of the Joe's deadliest team members". G.I. Joe: Retaliation actress Adrianne Palicki said that she "wanted to be Jinx so badly" while growing up.
