= Dial Tone (G.I. Joe) =

Character from the G.I. Joe franchise

Dial Tone is code name of two fictional characters from the G.I. Joe: A Real American Hero toyline, comic books and animated series.

The first is male and debuted in 1986. He is the G.I. Joe Team's communications expert. He is voiced by Hank Garrett in the Sunbow/Marvel G.I. Joe animated series.

The second is female, and makes her first appearance in the new IDW comic series. A version also appears in the G.I. Joe: Resolute animated series.

== Jack S. Morelli ==
=== Profile ===
Dial Tone
- G.I. Joe character
- Dial Tone as seen in the Sunbow/Marvel G.I. Joe animated series
- First appearance: 1986
- Voiced by: Hank Garrett (Sunbow/Marvel); Curt Bonnem (G.I. Joe: Operation Blackout)

In-universe information
- Affiliation: G.I. Joe
- Specialty: Communications Expert
- File name: Morelli, Jack S.
- Birth place: Eugene, Oregon
- SN: RA428713360
- Rank: E-4 (Corporal) (1986); E-6 (Staff Sergeant) (2002)
- Primary MOS: Radio Telecommunications
- Secondary MOS: Infantry
- Subgroups: Sonic Fighters; Tiger Force

Dial Tone is the G.I. Joe Team's electronics and communications expert. His real name is Jack S. Morelli, and his rank is that of corporal E-4. Dial Tone was born in Eugene, Oregon.

Dial Tone built his own crystal radio set when he was ten. By fourteen he was part of a CB net, and had his own ham station by the time he was sixteen. Dial Tone made all his own equipment, buying parts with quarters which he earned by bagging groceries. He joined the army to further his education in his chosen field, and became the Joe team's communications expert. Despite this, he has been seen many times fighting on the battlefield.

=== Toys ===
Dial-Tone was first released as an action figure in 1986. The figure was repainted and released as part of the "Special Missions: Brazil" box set in 1986, and the Sonic Fighters line in 1990. A new version of Dial-Tone was released in 1994 as part of the Battle Corps line.

Dial-Tone was also included in a 2-pack with General Hawk in 2000, an 8-pack in 2002, and sold with the A.W.E. Striker, and the Tiger Force 5-pack in 2003.

=== Comics ===
In the Marvel Comics G.I. Joe series, he first appeared in issue #56. He is part of a G.I. Joe assault team in the fictional country of Sierra Gordo. The Joes take over a Cobra 'Terror Drome'. Despite Serpentor and Tomax and Xamot trying to kill them, they take it apart and steal all the pieces.

He takes part in a mission to a South American jungle to hunt a Nazi war criminal. Dial-Tone is part of a different team that successfully plants spy equipment at the Cobra Consulate building in New York City.

Later, he is part of a team attempting to stop hostage takers in Frankfurt, Germany. At the end of the comic series it is revealed that Dial-Tone invented numerous state of the art innovative devices that he patented and made him wealthy.

Dial-Tone shows up in the IDW series as part of a team trying to track down Destro.

In total he appears in 206 G.I. Joe comic book issues.

=== Animated series ===
==== Sunbow ====
In the Sunbow G.I. Joe TV series, Dial-Tone was portrayed as being somewhat nerdy compared to the other tech-savvy Joes as well as having bad taste in clothing when it came to his out-of-date civilian wardrobe. He was often seen in the company of both Wet-Suit and Leatherneck and even fixed them both up with dates although Leatherneck found his friend's taste in women somewhat lacking as well. He was outgoing and eager to please to the point of being obsequious. When he was on the military base, he spent most of his spare time with Mainframe creating and playing video games. When assigned to combat or missions, he was under the command of Flint's platoon. His status as a Joe was likewise questionable and in an issue of Marvel Age he was said to be a "probationary member" and that he was hanging on "by the skin of his teeth".

In "Glamour Girls", Low-Light and Dial-Tone help the former's sister move and investigate her disappearance along with several other female celebrities. Dial-Tone is part of the group of Joes that go to rescue Cover Girl, Lady Jaye and the kidnapped models and actresses.

In "The Spy Who Rooked Me", Dial-Tone is with Flint, Lady Jaye and Cross Country on a mission to deliver nerve gas to a chemical weapons arsenal, working with a British secret agent as well.

In "The Most Dangerous Thing in the World", he unsuccessfully attempts to build his satellite dish. Shipwreck, Dial-Tone and Lifeline are promoted to Colonel through false orders from the Department of Defense sent by Cobra. In an armor drill, Dial-Tone reprograms the missile guidance systems of the H.A.V.O.C.s, leading to an accident that almost kills Leatherneck and Wet-Suit. The poor leadership and disagreement on battle tactics among the three "Colonels" throws the G.I. Joe Team into complete disarray, but Hawk returns from a NATO conference and saves the day for the Joes. Afterwards, Hawk tells Dial-Tone that he has the desire to be a leader, but not the ability.

In "Joe's Night Out", Dial-Tone arranges a date for himself, Wet-Suit and Leatherneck with three of his women friends at a new nightclub in town. Soon, Serpentor sends the club into outer space and threatens to activate explosives planted on the club. Dial-Tone contacts Joe headquarters via the club's video system, requesting for a rescue ship. After that fails, Wet-Suit decides to deactivate the explosives. Dial-Tone provides him with a six-pack of sodas as propellants, a radio communicator in a fishbowl used in place of a helmet, and attaches him with a makeshift lifeline. After disarming the explosives, the Joes convert the club's engines to run on the air within the club and Dial-Tone activates one of them, returning the club to Earth.

In "Sins of the Fathers", Dial-Tone is turned down for re-enlistment and hired by a disguised Zarana for a project utilizing his expertise in communications involving "very specific parameters". In his new job, Dial-Tone creates a communications system near the ruins of Destro's castle, secretly intended to awaken a creature, which Cobra Commander orders to kill Serpentor. Dial-Tone is rescued and restored to Joe status. It is later revealed that the Joe team only turned him down to give him a foolproof cover, knowing that Cobra would try and recruit him.

==== G.I. Joe: The Movie ====
Dial-Tone also appeared briefly in the 1987 animated film G.I. Joe: The Movie.

== Female Dial Tone ==
=== Fictional character biography ===
Dial Tone
- G.I. Joe character
- Voiced by: Grey DeLisle (Resolute)

In-universe information
- Affiliation: G.I. Joe
- Specialty: Communications
- File name: Morelli, Jill S.
- SN: 428-71-JM33
- Rank: E-4 (Specialist)
- Primary MOS: Radio Telecommunications

A blond female character named Dial Tone first appeared in the new IDW comic series. To date, no background information has been revealed about this character. No mention has been made of the Jack S. Morelli character in this series.

=== Comics - IDW Publishing ===
The new Dial Tone works with Scarlett in the think tank at the Pit.

=== Resolute ===
In G.I. Joe: Resolute, there is a female agent working on the USS Flagg is approached by Gung Ho and asked for information about the recent Cobra attack. She is later identified by the code name, Dial Tone. Dial Tone later escapes the Flagg along with everyone onboard when Cobra Commander had the particle cannon targeting the Flagg.

Writer Warren Ellis has said the character was originally just a background character, but she was made a Joe due to the amount of dialogue he gave her; "they gave me several [codenames] to choose from, and I chose Dial Tone, because it amused me".

=== G.I. Joe: The Rise of Cobra ===
In the 2009 video game G.I. Joe: The Rise of Cobra, a female Dial Tone appears as a non-playable supporting character. Her data file states that her real name is "Jill J. Morelli," and that she took over her brother's post on the team after he disappeared on a mission. This version of Dial Tone is voiced by Aimee Miles.

=== Toys ===
A toy of the female version of Dial Tone was released in a Desert Troop Builder 5-Pack exclusive to Toys R Us stores in 2009.

== Other works ==
Dial Tone is briefly mentioned in the fiction novel 6 Sick Hipsters. In the story, the character Paul Achting spent four years collecting G.I. Joe figures to set up a battle scene between the Joes and Cobra. Although Dial Tone's figure is not depicted, as Paul imagined the characters in his head he described Sgt. Slaughter "speaking on a transistor radio to Dial Tone, the communications specialist, back at G.I. Joe headquarters".
