= Lifeline (G.I. Joe) =

Character from the G.I. Joe franchise

- G.I. Joe character
- Lifeline as seen in the Sunbow/Marvel G.I. Joe animated series
- First appearance: 1986
- Voiced by: Stan Wojno (Sunbow/Marvel); Jordan Reynolds (G.I. Joe: Operation Blackout)

In-universe information
- Affiliation: G.I. Joe
- Specialty: Rescue Trooper
- File name: Steen, Edwin C.
- Birth place: Seattle, Washington
- SN: RA 128-03-2496
- Rank: E-5 (Sergeant); O-3 (Captain) (Devil's Due comics)
- Primary MOS: Medic
- Secondary MOS: X-Ray Technician; Rescue Operations
- Subgroups: Tiger Force; Battle Corps; Anti-Venom Task Force

Lifeline is a fictional character from the G.I. Joe: A Real American Hero toyline, comic books and animated series. He is the G.I. Joe Team's first class rescue trooper who debuted in 1986. He is seen as a compassionate and dedicated medic who is always willing to put himself in danger to save his fellow Joes. Lifeline is also a skilled pilot and is often seen flying the G.I. Joe Tomahawk helicopter.

== Profile ==
His real name is Edwin C. Steen, and his rank is that of sergeant E-5. Lifeline was born in Seattle, Washington.

Lifeline's primary military specialty is medic. Lifeline spent five years as a paramedic with the Seattle Fire Department, until he learned that EMS personnel could not collect their pensions if they became disabled while giving aid when they are not on duty. Since he figured that rescue personnel were never actually off duty, he decided to instead join the army as a medic. Lifeline is also an avowed pacifist; he's a black belt in 'aikido', the martial art of directing violent energy away from oneself.

The filecard for the 2002 Real American Hero Collection version of Lifeline inexplicably altered his backstory, changing his real name to Greg Scott (a name derived from Hasbro's design manager at the time) and his hometown to Spring Valley, New York. This incarnation of Lifeline is depicted separately alongside the original Lifeline on the cover of G.I. Joe: American Elite #25 (which depicts almost every character who was part of the G.I. Joe Team up to that point), but never had a significant role in the comics or any other media outside the toyline.

== Toys ==
Lifeline was first released as an action figure in 1986. Kellogg's cereal offered this figure as a mail-in premium in 1991.

The figure was repainted and released as part of the Tiger Force line in 1988.

A new version of Lifeline was released in 1994 as part of the Battle Corps line. This was re-released in 2002 as part of The Real American Hero Collection, but with different arms and a new head sculpt. A second repaint was released in 2010 as a G.I. Joe Convention exclusive, with this version retaining all the original parts.

As part of the 30th Anniversary toy line, a new version of Lifeline was released in 2011.

== Comics ==
=== Marvel Comics ===
In the Marvel Comics G.I. Joe series, he first appeared in G.I. Joe: Special Missions #4. His fellow Joes become angry at him due to his unwillingness to fire a gun or assault an enemy. Lifeline saves the day by utilizing aikido against the Oktober Guard member 'Horrowshow'. He supervises the calm evacuation of wounded after the first Cobra Island civil war.

=== Devil's Due ===
Lifeline answers the call when gathered intelligence proves Cobra is a threat yet again and as such, the Joe team needs to be revived. is one of the many veterans to encounter the new class of 'Joes', who are also called 'Greenshirts'.

Lifeline and Mainframe lead neutralization efforts when many Joe soldiers and Greenshirts are poisoned by Cobra-created nanites. They succeed, saving many lives.

In the Devil's Due Joe series, Frontline, Lifeline joins Duke, Frostbite and other Joe members in investigating a long abandoned arctic science facility. During the course of the story, Lifeline uses a pistol for the first time against mutated humanoids. He also comes to believe he is infected but tests indicate he has avoided any mutation.

Later, Lifeline is captured by 'Coil', the army Serpentor has created and imprisoned on Cobra Island. Joining him are the Joes Roadblock, Spirit, Rock'N'Roll, Snake Eyes, Cover Girl and Firewall. They are freed when the new prisoner, Cobra Commander neutralizes the guards. Lifeline focuses on Cover-Girl and then Snake Eyes, who both become injured. All imprisoned make their way through the second Cobra civil war and to the Joe lines.

Lifeline is seen helping the wounded transfer after Cobra soldiers attack the Joe base known as 'The Rock'.

=== Dreamwave ===
Lifeline is one of the background characters in the 2003 Transformers/G.I. Joe crossover that is set in World War II.

=== IDW ===
Lifeline is sent on medical support for a mission involving the rescue of peace activist Adele Burkhart. He's seen sympathizing with Adele's peaceful ways, in contrast to Rock'N'Roll, who points out Adele disagrees with the Joe's mission.

== Animated series ==
=== Sunbow ===
Lifeline appeared in the original G.I. Joe animated series. He is voiced by Stan Wojno Jr. He first appeared in the second-season episode "Arise, Serpentor, Arise!: Part I", in which he refuses to help Lift-Ticket arm a Tomahawk. During missions, Lifeline is often seen with Lift-Ticket in the latter's Tomahawk, for if rescue is needed. His strict pacifism also puts himself and his fellow Joes in danger at times; for example, in the episode "Cobrathon", when Lifeline fell into a pool of piranhas, he refused to be pulled to safety by touching Sci-Fi's rifle.

Lifeline plays a major role in the episode "The Million Dollar Medic", in which he saves Brittany "Bree" Van Mark and her father, wealthy business owner Owen Van Mark when their yacht gets caught in a crossfire between G.I. Joe and Cobra. Bree then falls in love with Lifeline and keeps sending gifts to him. Lifeline does not want them, but is reluctant to tell her. Cobra uses Bree's infatuation on Lifeline to launch a deadly attack on G.I. Joe. Lifeline protects her when Cobra threatens Owen to relinquish his company to them, and they eventually kiss.

In "Cobrathon", Sci-Fi and Lifeline are captured during a reconnaissance mission and tortured in a telethon that Cobra is running. Cobra later attempts to kill the two Joes; Lifeline is determined to be killed by two cobras, but he is saved by Low-Light.

In "My Favorite Things", Lifeline and Wet Suit travel to India to obtain a sample of Serpentor's blood to be used to save Leatherneck's life. After the plan fails, Lifeline convinces Wet Suit to let Serpentor's pet snake bite him, as it is the only way to get the venom antidote.

Lifeline has another major role in "The Most Dangerous Thing in the World", in which Cobra hacks into the Department of Defense's computer system and sends false orders promoting him, Dial-Tone and Shipwreck to Colonel. Lifeline's unwillingness to let the Joes use weapons, combined with Shipwreck and Dial-Tone's ineptitude as well as their disagreement over battle tactics, throws the G.I. Joe Team into complete disarray. After General Hawk returns from a NATO conference, he helps the Joes win a battle and Lifeline, Shipwreck and Dial-Tone are returned to their previous positions.

In "Second Hand Emotions", it is revealed that Lifeline comes from a family of pacifists, and that he has been estranged from them, especially his father, as they disapprove of him joining G.I. Joe. In the same episode, Lifeline attends his sister's wedding with several Joes, hoping to reconcile with his father, but runs into complications when the Dreadnoks implant a small device on him and other Joes that allows Doctor Mindbender to control their emotions with music. As a consequence, Lifeline objects the marriage and fights with the other Joes, then hijacks a trolley. Realizing his emotions caused him to act out of control, Lifeline apologizes to his sister. He later saves Hawk and Scarlett by disabling a bomb, and brings the injured Joes to stay a night at his family home. Lifeline and his father eventually make up. After stopping Cobra's scheme, the Joes attend Lifeline's sister's wedding again.

Lifeline is featured in one of the series' public service announcements, in which he teaches kids to make healthy choices in eating.

=== G.I. Joe: The Movie ===
Lifeline also appeared briefly in the 1987 animated film G.I. Joe: The Movie. He is part of a search party along with Flint and Iceberg to find a missing unit of Joes led by Roadblock. After finding a blinded Roadblock, Lifeline helps him regain his sight.

== Novel ==
Lifeline appears as a supporting character in the G.I. Joe novel The Sultan's Secret by Peter Lerangis.

== Other works ==
Lifeline's figure is briefly featured in the fiction novel 6 Sick Hipsters. In the story, the character Paul Achting spent four years collecting G.I. Joe figures to set up a battle scene between the Joes and Cobra. As he imagined the characters in his head, he described three of the Joes hanging back from the front lines: Lifeline, Mainframe, and Iceberg. High above Iceberg and Mainframe "on the chair at the desk was Lifeline, his steely gaze trained upon the battlefield and rescue medic kit at his side. He was ready. His time with the Seattle Fire Department had prepared him for anything. He'd seen more in his five years with the S.F.D. than most men see in an entire lifetime."
