= G.I. Joe and the Transformers =

4-issue comic book limited series

- Autobot Bumblebee is mistakenly blown up by forces of G.I. Joe. From issue #1 of the G.I. Joe and the Transformers mini-series published by Marvel Comics.

Publication information
- Publisher: Marvel Comics
- Publication date: January–April 1987
- No. of issues: 4
- Main character(s): G.I. Joe Team; Transformers

Creative team
- Written by: Michael Higgins

G.I. Joe and the Transformers is a 4-issue American comic book limited series featuring characters from G.I. Joe and the Transformers and published by Marvel Comics in 1987.

== Publication ==
G.I. Joe and the Transformers, was a 4-issue mini-series running from January to April 1987. The series was written by Michael Higgins, and teamed-up the two popular Hasbro properties of the 1980s, G.I. Joe and the Transformers.

A trade paperback later collected all four issues in 1993. This series (along with Marvel's G.I. Joe #139–142) was collected in trade paperback collections by IDW Publishing in 2012 as G.I. Joe/Transformers Vol. 1, as well as being included in the 8th and final volume of Transformers Classics.

== Plot summary ==
The story had the G.I. Joe Team and the Autobots joining forces to stop the Decepticons and Cobra from destroying the world. The story featured Bumblebee being destroyed by G.I. Joe forces and rebuilt as Goldbug. The Joes, the Autobots, and Cobra (after being betrayed by the Decepticons) must join forces to stop the Decepticons from activating an energy drill device to suck up energy from the Earth's core, which would destroy the planet in the process.
