= Mainframe (G.I. Joe) =

Character from the G.I. Joe franchise

- G.I. Joe character
- Mainframe as seen in the Sunbow/Marvel G.I. Joe animated series.
- First appearance: 1986
- Voiced by: Patrick Pinney (Sunbow/Marvel); Lucas Schuneman (G.I. Joe: Operation Blackout)

In-universe information
- Affiliation: G.I. Joe
- Specialty: Communications Expert
- File name: Blaine L. Parker
- Birth place: Phoenix, Arizona
- SN: SN: RA 818-50-1673 then SN: 818-50-BL73
- Rank: E-5 (Sergeant); E-6 (Staff Sergeant) (Devil's Due comics)
- Primary MOS: Computer technology
- Secondary MOS: Infantry

Mainframe is a fictional character from the G.I. Joe: A Real American Hero toyline, comic books and animated series. He is the G.I. Joe Team's communications expert and debuted in 1986.

== Profile ==
Born in Phoenix, Arizona, Mainframe's real name is Blaine L. Parker, and his rank is sergeant E-5.

Mainframe was both an athlete and a scholar as a child, though as a self-confessed nerd, he would much rather learn about computers than do anything else. He graduated high school at the age of seventeen, and immediately enlisted in the Army airborne. He soon headed into battle overseas, receiving his Combat Infantryman Badge, and later left the army to get his degree from MIT on the G.I. Bill. Mainframe then did a stint developing computer software in Silicon Valley, making big bucks and fighting boredom with a stick. Luckily, the Marines were looking for a few good men with just his qualifications, and Mainframe was soon back in uniform. He even served at the Pentagon for a time, before joining the G.I. Joe Team as a computer specialist.

The world's ever-increasing reliance upon technology makes him a valued member of the G.I. Joe Team, and his ability to design computer viruses makes him a nuisance to Cobra Command.

== Toys ==
=== A Real American Hero ===
Mainframe was first released as an action figure in 1986. He was also available in 1987, and was discontinued in 1988.

A re-colored version of Mainframe was also released in 1986, as an exclusive in a special set from Toys R Us named "Special Mission: Brazil". The boxed set also included Claymore, and re-colored versions of Dial Tone, Leatherneck, and Wet Suit. The set included a cassette tape that detailed the secret mission.

=== 25th Anniversary ===
In 2008, a new version of Mainframe was released, but renamed "Dataframe". A Comic Pack with Beach Head & Dataframe also has been released.

== Comics ==
=== Marvel Comics ===
In the Marvel Comics G.I. Joe series, he first appeared in issue #58. In that issue, Mainframe and Dusty are sent on a mission into a Middle Eastern nation torn apart by the war between the Royalist rebels and the forces of dictator Colonel Sharif. Mainframe and Dusty are sent in to locate a Cobra Terror Drome launch base hidden in the country after spy satellites detect the base's infrared signature. In exchange for helping them ambush one of Sharif's weapons convoys, the Royalists give the Joes a guide to lead them through the desert, a local teen named Rashid. Much of the story deals with Rashid's disrespect for Mainframe for not being a 'real' soldier. However, after watching Mainframe reprogram a Firebat to strafe enemy troops and hearing about his past as a frontline soldier from Dusty, Rashid changes his mind about Mainframe and even becomes an expert in computer in order to honor him. Later, after detecting a shuttle launched from Cobra Island, Mainframe is part of a team that heads into space on board the space shuttle Defiant to defend U.S. satellites against a Cobra attack. Some time later, Mainframe works on the USS Flagg as part of Hawk's operations team during the Joes' involvement in the Cobra civil war. Mainframe serves in a similar capacity on the Flagg later during the Battle of Benzheen. He later aids the G.I. Joe Ninja Force in their efforts to help Destro remove a bounty on his head.

=== Action Force ===
Mainframe also appears in the British Action Force continuity. In one incident he's part of a Joe team taken prisoner. They have access to vital technology that would allow Cobra to more easily attack European interests. Mainframe's team and a secondary Joe squad cause enough chaos Cobra's plans are stopped.

=== Transformers ===
In the original out of continuity G.I. Joe/Transformers crossover, Mainframe is essential in rebuilding the severely damaged Bumblebee.

=== Devil's Due ===
Mainframe appears many times when Devil's Due takes over the Joe license. He is one of the first ones recruited back into active duty when gathered intelligence indicates Cobra is a threat yet again. He works closely with Lifeline to neutralize the threat of microscopic nanites which are causing various forms of deadly havoc. A couple of ideas work out and the nanites are defeated. At a later point, Mainframe's long-term efforts to uncover white-collar Cobra crime results in Roadblock fighting Dreadnoks on live television; this just increases Roadblock's financial well-being. Mainframe's work at the computer causes him to admit he needs to get out more.

G.I. Joe comes into conflict with Serpentor and his new independent army, "Coil", which has taken over Cobra Island. Mainframe teams with Flash for a sabotage mission against EMP generators. Coil troops trap the two with a bomb and they perish when it explodes. The generators are also destroyed. Mainframe's name is part of memorial in Arlington dedicated to all Joes who have lost their lives in the line of duty. Mainframe's protégé, Firewall later aids his teammates in finishing an old mission involving the drug dealer Headman. Rashid also assists in this mission.

Mainframe is part of the alternate reality crossover G.I. Joe Vs. Transformers 2. In the climactic battle he assists Doctor Mindbender and Wheeljack in saving the Earth from complete destruction. However, it doesn't go quite as planned, with the after-effects of the life saving computer hacks accidentally incinerating his Joe teammate Mercer.

=== IDW ===
Mainframe is the Joe soldier who discovers that Cobra exists as an organization in the first place; his theories that they are a group willing to profit in the long term pans out. In order to chase the proof, he goes off base, with Snake Eyes the only Joe who thinks he is not a traitor. As he is Joe-trained, the other Joes chasing him use lethal force.

He later returns to the team, a trusted field commander. At one point, he leads operations in Europe defending the life of an injured diplomat, shot in a Cobra attack. Said diplomat is trusted by both sides in a bitter conflict. Mainframe is later called in to assist in tracking down Destro's possible involvement in a fatal conflict in Rio de Janeiro.

== Animated series ==
=== Sunbow ===
Mainframe appeared in the original G.I. Joe animated series, voiced by Patrick Pinney. He was often partnered with Dial Tone, and played video games with him in his spare time. In the 5-part mini series "Arise, Serpentor, Arise!", Mainframe and his teammate Beach Head take shelter in the actual coffin of Vlad Tepes from his crumbling castle. In the same series, Mainframe mentions a posting he had monitoring base security in Vietnam. Mainframe was also apparently married with children at one point; while driving through Transylvania, he remarks that the country reminds him of when he would take his kids trick or treating.

In the episode "Computer Complications", he mentions having an ex-wife. In that same episode, Zarana goes undercover at a Joe base as "Carol Weidler". During that time, Mainframe and Zarana develop romantic feelings for each other. Mainframe also programs robot subs to G.I. Joe control, but Zarana reverses the programming, though she saves his life when Zartan leaves an explosive on him. "Carol" then reveals her true identity to Mainframe, who lets her escape. Mainframe is later treated for "neurological shock" and blames himself for the loss of an anti-matter powered space probe that G.I. Joe and Cobra were after and the USS Flagg, but Duke says otherwise. The episode ends showing both Mainframe and Zarana, miles away looking at the Moon, perhaps pondering the same thoughts.

In "Cobrathon", Duke, Beach Head, Mainframe, Sci-Fi and Lifeline infiltrate a Cobra software development site, where Mainframe steals a decoder box, concluding that Cobra has gone into pay television business. Mainframe and the other Joes escape with it, albeit without Sci-Fi and Lifeline, who are captured. They soon discover that Cobra is holding a telethon to raise money for a Cobra computer virus designed to destroy the computers in every Interpol agency in the world. Using a computer code sheet which Beach Head stole from the software site, Mainframe deciphers the code and finds out the computer housing the virus is located in an abandoned Anasazi city. There, Mainframe destroys the Cobra supercomputer by entering his own computer virus into the infected system, causing the Cobra virus to overload his computer instead.

In "Grey Hairs and Growing Pains", Mainframe is one of the Joes investigating Cobra's theft of a special youth formula. He and Dial-Tone interview football star Brett Tinker regarding his commercial for an "ageless care process", only to be assaulted in response. For further investigation, the Joes visit a Cobra-owned Ageless Care Spa, where they are led to the "steam and sun rooms". In one room, Lady Jaye, Mainframe and Dial-Tone turn into children, while in the other room, Flint, Gung-Ho and Sci-Fi turn into old men. With help from an actress associated with the youth formula, they infiltrate a Cobra desert factory to find a cure. Mainframe again meets Zarana, who gives him the information on reversing the aging/rejuvenating process. He reprograms the factory's prototype sun and steam rooms, restoring the Joes to their normal ages, and bluffs the Cobras into retreat.

In "Joe's Night Out", Mainframe assists Dr. Mullaney in his project to build a nitrogen fuel turbine. In the same episode, Serpentor sends a nightclub called Club Open Air into space, with Leatherneck, Wet-Suit, Dial-Tone and civilians inside, and demands that Dr. Mullaney surrender to Cobra in return for the lives of those in the club to be spared. Mainframe sends the three Joes Mullaney's formula, which they use to fuel the rockets with the air within the club, and prevents Cobra from obtaining it by inserting the computer virus which Cobra developed for their Cobrathon into the disks containing the information.

=== G.I. Joe: The Movie ===
Mainframe also appeared briefly in the 1987 animated film G.I. Joe: The Movie. He is present during the test of the Broadcast Energy Transmitter (B.E.T.), and is seen in battle as well.

== Books ==
Mainframe is a supporting character in the novel Divide and Conquer. Without permission, he risks damage to Joe Headquarters to gain information from Cobra computers.

Mainframe is featured in the younger-children storybook "Operation Starfight" drawn by Earl Norem. He is wounded in the arm during the story.

== Video games ==
Mainframe appears as a non-playable supporting character named "Data Frame" in the 2009 video game G.I. Joe: The Rise of Cobra, voiced by Wally Wingert.

== Other works ==
Mainframe's figure is briefly featured in the fiction novel 6 Sick Hipsters. In the story, the character Paul Achting spent four years collecting G.I. Joe figures to set up a battle scene between the Joes and Cobra. As he imagined the characters in his head, he described three of the Joes hanging back from the front lines: Lifeline, Mainframe, and Iceberg. Beside Iceberg, "Mainframe, clad in his distinctive gray short-sleeved uniform, manned the battlefield computer. They did not speak to each other. Only waited and watched."
