= G.I. Joe Team =

Fictional elite covert special operations unit in the G.I. Joe franchise

G.I. Joe
- G.I. Joe unit insignia patch used in the live action films

Publication information
- Publisher: Marvel Comics
- First appearance: G.I. Joe: A Real American Hero #1
- Created by: Larry Hama; Hasbro

In-story information
- Type of organization: Military unit
- Base(s): G.I. Joe headquarters
- Leader(s): General Colton (original leader); General Flagg; General Hawk; Sergeant Hauser

Roster

G.I. Joe is the code name of a fictional elite covert special operations unit operating under the control of the United States Armed Forces in the G.I. Joe universe. In the 1960s and 1970s, a toy military adventure character called G.I. Joe was available. From 1982, the name "G.I. Joe" referred to the team, also known as the "Joe team" or the "Joes". The G.I. Joe team was introduced as the G.I. Joe: A Real American Hero toyline by Hasbro. Later, the Marvel G.I. Joe: A Real American Hero comic books and the G.I. Joe: A Real American Hero television cartoons were released. The team's battle cry is "Yo Joe!"

== Background ==
The G.I. Joe team consists of US Army personnel, representatives from the United States Marine Corps, the United States Air Force, the United States Navy, and the United States Coast Guard. A few are from other forces such as the British Army and the Australian Army. Members are selected from the best recruits who bring with them their particular skills.

== History ==
=== Marvel Comics ===
In the first issue, the team's official codename is "Special Counter – Terrorist Unit Delta". Its founding leader is Vietnam A-Team veteran, Lieutenant General Joseph Colton, chosen by John F. Kennedy just before the president's assassination. "G. I. Joe" is a temporary code name. The members of the team as of issue 1 in 1982 were Hawk, Stalker, Scarlett, Snake Eyes, Breaker, Clutch, Rock 'n Roll, Steeler, Grand Slam, Flash, Short-Fuze, Grunt and Zap.

The team is one of the United States' many Special Operations Forces. A Mossad agent identifies team members he meets as part of G.I. Joe because they are "too scruffy to be Delta Force, and not weird enough to be SOG". The team is portrayed as a covert group with access to sophisticated military equipment. Over time, the team is more public with action in high profile missions.

=== Devil's Due ===
In the comics series by Devil's Due Publishing, the existence of the Joe team is known to the general public but its missions remain covert. The Joe team has been reduced to a skeleton staff. When a new enemy, the "Red Shadows" arrive, the team is victorious but afterwards is disbanded. However, this was a ruse and the Joe team is reformed with a new core team and the former members as reserves. In the G.I. Joe: America's Elite series, the new team is fully covert.

=== IDW ===
In the comics series created by IDW Publishing the G.I. Joe team is a covert organisation operating under the auspices of the US military forces. Their mission is to handle extreme threats. In order to remain covert, new members of the team must fake their own deaths and completely leave their former lives. The team's base, known as "The Pit", is an abandoned military establishment in the Nevada desert.

=== Animated series ===
The 1985 G.I. Joe animated television series and the G.I. Joe animated movie expanded on the function of what the show's opening describes as a "special mission force". The team members have many extraordinary skills. They can work in many different environments and operate many different types of vehicles and aircraft. In the animated productions, the team is known to the public. For example, in the episode 20 Questions, the team appears on a talk show and in the episode Once Upon a Joe, the team are greeted excitedly by children.

== Factions ==
G.I. Joe has different factions in their organization:

=== Battleforce 2000 ===
Battleforce 2000 is a hi-tech unit of the Joes using experimental weaponry under battlefield conditions. They consist of Avalanche, Blaster, Blocker, Dee-Jay, Dodger, Knockdown, and Maverick.

=== Eco-Warriors ===
The Eco-Warriors are a faction of G.I. Joe that came together when Cobra started harming the environment with toxic sludge. The toyline had Barbecue, Clean-Sweep, Deep Six, Flint, and Ozone in this line-up.

=== Mega Marines ===
The Mega Marines are a faction of G.I. Joe that specialize in fighting the Mega-Monsters that consist of the Bio-Vipers and the Monstro-Vipers. The toyline had Blast-Off, Clutch, Gung-Ho, and Mirage in this line-up.

=== Night Force ===
Night Force is a G.I. Joe faction that are outfitted with night time surveillance and defensive operations. The toyline's roster consist of Crazylegs, Lt. Falcon, G.I. Joe, Psyche-Out, Sneak-Peek, and Tunnel Rat. The additional roster consists of Charbroil, Lightfoot, Muskrat, Repeater, Shockwave, and Spearhead. The 2003-2004 relaunch had Cross Hair, Duke, Grunt, Gung-Ho, and Nunchuk as members as well as a variant of Action Man.

=== Ninja Force ===
Led by Storm Shadow sometime after he defected from Cobra, Ninja Force is a group of ninjas affiliated with the Arashikage clan that were formed as a part of the G.I. Joe Team to combat Cobra. Its inaugural members are Nunchuk, T'Jbang, and Dojo. Ninja Force later gained other members like Banzai, Bushido, and T'Gin-Zu.

=== Slaughter's Marauders ===
Slaughter's Marauders is a faction led by Sgt. Slaughter that specializes in quick offensive attacks. Besides Sgt. Slaughter, the rest of the group in the toyline consists of Barbecue, Footloose, Low-Light, Mutt, and Spirit.

=== Slaughter's Renegades ===
Slaughter's Renegades is a splinter cell faction led by Sgt. Slaughter and consisting of ex-Cobra Viper Mercer, ex-football player Red Dog, and ex-circus strongman/acrobat Taurus. It is said that this group doesn't publicly exist and are free to do certain missions for G.I. Joe. All three characters were sold in the toyline as a three-pack.

=== Star Brigade ===
The Star Brigade are a faction that specialize in working in outer space when fighting Cobra who has allied with the Lunartix Empire. Their line-up in the toyline consists of Countdown, Duke, Effects, Gears, Hawk, Heavy Duty, Ozone, Payload, Roadblock, Robo-J.O.E., Rock 'n Roll, Sci-Fi, and Space Shot.

== Counterparts ==
There are different counterparts of G.I. Joe that work with the G.I. Joe team:

=== Comando Heroicos ===
The Comando Heroicos is the Argentinian branch of G.I. Joe. Known members include Glenda, Sgt. Redmack, Sgt. Shimik, and Sgt. Topson.

=== Oktober Guard ===
The October Guard is Eastern Europe's answer for G.I. Joe. Known members include Red Star, Big Bear, Colonel Brekhov, Daina, Dragonsky, Lt. Gorky, Horrorshow, Misha, Schrage, Stormavik, and Wong. Red Star maintains that G.I. Joe is the Oktober Guard's counterpart.

== Productions ==
Generally, Hawk is the team's commanding officer. Duke is the senior non-commissioned officer and second-in-command. Flint often serves as third in command (though being a warrant officer, he technically outranks Duke) and usually leads field missions whenever Duke cannot. Beach-Head and Sgt. Slaughter are labeled as fourth and fifth in command, respectively. Both of them also serve as drill instructors and trainers to new Joe recruits. However, a number of differences exist between the comics, cartoon and even the toyline.

=== Marvel Comics ===
The original Marvel comic book series takes a fairly realistic approach to the military command hierarchy. In the early issues of the comic, the overall command of the G.I. Joe team falls to brigadier general Lawrence J. Flagg, who serves as liaison with the Pentagon. Hawk is the field leader, with Stalker as the senior non-commissioned officer and de facto second-in-command. After General Flagg is killed in issue 19, Hawk assumes overall command of the team in issue 33 and appoints Duke as field leader. Vice Admiral Keel-Haul is introduced in issue 36. General Joseph Colton (the model for a G.I. Joe 12 inch toy) appears in issues 86, 127 and 152 but is not a member of the team.

=== Real American Hero cartoon series ===
The Real American Hero animated series produced by Sunbow Entertainment mainly focused on newer characters. In the initial miniseries, Duke served as team leader, answering to General Flagg, while Flint served as second-in-command and was the lead character of the second miniseries. In the second full season, coinciding with the release of a new Hawk action figure, Hawk is established as the commander, with Duke as second-in-command and Flint in third, with Beach Head and Sgt. Slaughter also in leadership roles. This continued with the newer series produced by DIC Entertainment that took place after the animated film. In addition during season one of the DIC series, Captain Grid-Iron served as the field commander.

=== G.I. Joe Extreme ===
G.I. Joe Extreme was a relaunch of the toy line that features a new team assembled by the mysterious Mr. Clancy to battle SKAR (Soldiers of Khaos, Anarchy and Ruin), an organization led by Iron Claw, who sought to use the instability of post-Cold War Eastern Europe to launch a campaign for world domination. The team is shown as a very small and elite group, and the only character to carry over was Sgt. Savage, who had been introduced late in the previous line. A cartoon series was produced by Sunbow and Gunther-Wahl Productions and distributed by Claster Television which was broadcast for two seasons.

Dark Horse Comics acquired the comic book license at the time and published two four-issue mini-series of G.I. Joe Extreme. The first, continuing from the cartoon series, sees the team defeat SKAR, which was established as having been initially founded in the 1960s but only becoming a threat after Iron Klaw took control in a coup. The second sees them battle Red Scream, a group opposed to globalization. A third nemesis, the I.R.O.N. Army (a reorganization of the remnants of SKAR) was mentioned in the last issue, but the series was canceled before the story could continue.

=== Sigma 6 ===
In the G.I. Joe: Sigma 6 series, the team is smaller and new characters are introduced gradually rather than en masse. The series gives the history that the team reformed with a new codename after their base was destroyed by Cobra.

=== The Rise of Cobra ===
In this movie, G.I. Joe is an acronym for Global Integrated Joint Operating Entity and the team include Hawk, Duke, Rip Cord, Scarlett, Breaker, Heavy Duty and Snake Eyes. It is an international force using advanced technology. The team's base is in Egypt. It is well funded due to global backing.

=== Renegades ===
In this series, the team, called the "Renegades", is founded by Lieutenant Shana “Scarlett” O'Hara and her ninja sensei Snake Eyes. The team members include Sergeant Conrad “Duke” Hauser, Corporal Marvin Roadblock Hinton, Private Nicky Tunnel Rat Lee, and Private Wallace “Rip Cord” Weems. Their purpose is to expose Cobra Industries for its illegal transgressions. However, they become wrongly accused of the ruin of Cobra Pharmaceuticals. The team must clear its name while avoiding a new nemesis, the Falcons, and is successful. The Falcons' commander is Flint. Its members include Lady Jaye, Wild Bill, Lift-Ticket, and Heavy Duty.

=== Retaliation ===
In the sequel to The Rise of Cobra, the team include Roadblock, Flint, Lady Jaye, Snake Eyes and Jinx with support from General Joseph Colton and Storm Shadow. Duke, Mouse, Grunt and Clutch were all killed by Cobra.

=== Snake Eyes ===
In the film, Scarlett is a major of the Joes who assisted the Arashikage Clan in their fight against Cobra. Snake Eyes learned from Scarlett that his father was a Joe targeted and killed by Cobra while working undercover to infiltrate Cobra. Scarlett asks Snake Eyes to join the team, but chooses to first find Tommy, who cast himself out of the Arashikage.

=== Transformers: Rise of the Beasts ===
At the end of the film, Noah Diaz is recruited by Agent Burke to join G.I. Joe while learning about the Autobots' existence.

== See also ==
- Delta Force
- G.I. Joe and the Transformers
