= Shockwave (G.I. Joe) =

- G.I. Joe character
- First appearance: 1988
- Voiced by: Garry Chalk

In-universe information
- Affiliation: G.I. Joe
- Specialty: S.W.A.T. Specialist
- File name: Faria, Jason A.
- Birth place: Dearborn, Michigan
- SN: 369-09-5643
- Rank: E-4 (Corporal) (1988); E-7 (Sergeant First Class) (1992)
- Primary MOS: Special Weapons and Tactics
- Secondary MOS: Military Police Officer
- Subgroups: Night Force; Drug Elimination Force

Shockwave is a fictional character from the G.I. Joe: A Real American Hero toyline, comic books and animated series. He is the G.I. Joe Team's S.W.A.T. specialist and debuted in 1988.

== Profile ==
His real name is Jason A. Faria, and his rank is that of corporal E-4. Shockwave was born in Dearborn, Michigan.

Shockwave's primary military specialty is Special Weapons and Tactics, and his secondary military specialty is choir. While serving with the Detroit Police Department, Shockwave was the youngest member of the S.W.A.T. Team and had earned two citations for bravery before joining the G.I. Joe Team. Shockwave is his S.W.A.T. Team's door kicker – the first one to get inside and assess the situation. As a member of a choir, he is also a tenor.

== Toys ==
Shockwave was first released as an action figure in 1988.

The figure was repainted and released as part of the Night Force line in 1989, packaged with Lightfoot.

A new version of Shockwave was released as an action figure in 1992, as part of the DEF (Drug Elimination Force) line.

A new version of the toy was named Shockblast and released in a 25th anniversary style two-pack with Destro in 2008. Shockblast was recolored in 2009 and released in a two-pack with a Night Creeper as part of the Rise of Cobra toyline.

== Comics ==
In the Marvel Comics G.I. Joe series, he first chronologically appeared in G.I. Joe Special Missions #17 (Jan 1989).

In G.I. Joe #86, he is with a team of Joes who respond to an emergency call from a facility at the top of the Chrysler Building. Shockwave, Hawk, Lightfoot, Repeater and Stalker learn the facility is part of the Strategic Defense Initiative and controls a 'death ray' that Cobra wishes to copy. The Joes successfully keep the information out of Cobra hands.

In the next issue, Shockwave is part of a Joe observation team sent to spy on Destro's Scotland castle. He works with Flint, Sneak Peek and Outback . The team get caught up in the middle of a battle when Cobra Commander attacks Destro.

Shockwave, Recondo and Lt. Falcon team up with the Oktober Guard in the fictional country of Sierra Gordo. In an attempt to escape from Iron Grenadiers, three of the Guard willingly sacrifice their lives to protect their comrades and the train full of soldiers the Joes have hidden themselves on.

Over in 'Special Missions', Shockwave leads a hostage rescue attempt when two terrorists take a family hostage in an isolated farmhouse. Shockwave is the one to figure out a potentially deadly error; the Joes had mistaken the innocent father for one of the terrorists because the man had an injury caused a leering smile. The mission ends with the family safe.

Shockwave also joins the DEF with Bullet-Proof, Mutt, and Cutter against the Headman.

=== Devil's Due ===
Shockwave is active in the Devil's Due Publishing G.I. Joe series. He is part of a team raiding a house in an attempt to capture prisoners. It goes badly, with Flint being wounded, but they accomplish their goal. Shockwave is one of the many Joes assaulting Cobra Island during the second Cobra civil war. While most of the team was away recovering from the battle, Shockwave was one of the Joes who helped Duke recruit Scott Sturgis into the team as Scanner. After the Jugglers cut the team down to only a handful of members, Shockwave made the cut. He and the other Joes joined new commander Philip Rey in stopping a Cobra Invasion of the PITT. Shockwave then took part in assaulting Cobra's Monolith Base.

After the team was restructured during America's Elite, Shockwave was placed on reserve status. He was reactivated during World War III and deployed to Colombia.

== Television ==
Shockwave appeared in the DIC G.I. Joe animated series, voiced by Garry Chalk.
