= Law & Order (G.I. Joe) =

G.I. Joe characters

Law
- G.I. Joe character
- First appearance: G.I. Joe: A Real American Hero #60 (June 1987)
- Voiced by: Ron Ortiz (Law, Sunbow/Marvel), Frank Welker (Order, Sunbow/Marvel); Corey Burton (Law, Renegades)

In-universe information
- Affiliation: G.I. Joe
- Specialty: Military Police
- File name: Lavigne, Christopher M.
- Birth place: Houston, Texas
- SN: 044-56-8883
- Rank: E-4 (Corporal)
- Primary MOS: Military Police
- Secondary MOS: Intelligence

Law & Order are fictional characters from the G.I. Joe: A Real American Hero toyline, comic books and animated series. They are the G.I. Joe Team's M.P. and K-9 and debuted in 1987.

== Profile ==
Law's real name is Christopher M. Lavigne, and his rank is that of specialist E-4. He was born in Houston, Texas.

Law's primary military specialty is Military Police, and his secondary military specialty is intelligence. He served in Houston's Fifth Ward as a police officer for two years but wanted a more fulfilling way to serve, so he enlisted as an MP with his German shepherd, Order. Law is trained as a dog handler and possesses a natural affinity for animals, and he is additionally Airborne qualified.

Law and Order are tasked with developing and maintaining G.I. Joe security protocols, and are known for their no-nonsense procedure and attention to detail.

== Toys ==
Law & Order were first released as action figures in 1987. Law was repainted and released as part of the "Sonic Fighters" line in 1990. A new version of Law was released in 1993 as part of the Battle Corps line.

Law & Order appeared as a Kreon in the 2013 G.I. Joe Kre-O toy line as part of the Check Point Alpha playset. The set includes Check Point Alpha, manned by Law & Order, and a Cobra motorcycle piloted by Firefly.

== Comics ==
=== Marvel Comics ===
In the Marvel Comics G.I. Joe series, Law & Order first appeared in G.I. Joe: A Real American Hero #60 (June 1987). Law is teamed with Lt. Falcon, Chuckles and Fast Draw. They are told they are official Joe members, but it is part of a conspiracy by rogue Pentagon officials to destroy Cobra Island with a building sized missile. This includes kidnapping General Hawk and taking him to a decommissioned beach resort. The group fights a faction of Dreadnoks in all the confusion and the missile is destroyed by a Cobra transport helicopter. Hawk makes the group official Joe members on the spot. Law (with Order) works again with Chuckles. They escort Hawk as he tries to recruit Billy, the son of Cobra Commander. Law and the others who fought the Dreadnoks travel to the official Joe headquarters and have to deal with paperwork problems.

=== Devil's Due ===
The two appear in issue 13 of the Devil's Due G.I. Joe Frontline. They are assisting a Joe team in raiding a civilian house. Despite booby traps, they capture their quarry.

== Animated series ==
=== G.I. Joe: The Movie ===
Law & Order first appeared in the animated film G.I. Joe: The Movie. Law is voiced by Ron Ortiz, while Order's vocal effects were provided by Frank Welker. They are established as a member of the "Rawhides", a group of new Joe recruits trained by Beach Head. During his training exercise, Law is tasked with finding a time bomb hidden in a village and disposing of it. He introduces Order to Beach Head, explaining that the dog is trained to sniff out explosives. Beach Head says that this is "supposed to be his test", but Law tells Beach Head that he and Order are a team. Order finds the bomb and brings it back, but Beach Head throws it away for Law to get it instead. However, Order quickly catches it in midair and runs back. Beach Head tries to pull it out of Order's mouth. At the last seconds, Order gives the bomb to Law, who throws it in the air before it explodes. Law and Order, along with the other Rawhides, are later some of the last Joes available for the final battle with Cobra-La. They sneak into Cobra-La and help the Joes defeat Cobra-La.

=== Renegades ===
Law & Order appeared in the G.I. Joe: Renegades episode "Busted". Christopher Lavigne is a prison guard who works at a prison with his dog Order. He is displeased with the warden's illegal fight activities and even brings Duke a meal, though it backfires. When Flint and Lady Jaye storm the prison, Order takes down Granger (the Captain of the Guards) and Christopher saves Flint from two inmates.
