= Slip Stream (G.I. Joe) =

Character in G.I. Joe

- G.I. Joe character
- Slip Stream as seen in the Sunbow/Marvel G.I. Joe animated series.
- First appearance: G.I. Joe #49 (July 1986)
- Voiced by: Dan Gilvezan

In-universe information
- Affiliation: G.I. Joe
- Specialty: Conquest X-30 Pilot
- File name: Boyajian, Gregory B.
- Birth place: Provo, Utah
- SN: 759-12-1013
- Rank: O-2 (First Lieutenant); O-3 (Captain) (Devil's Due comics)
- Primary MOS: Fighter Pilot
- Secondary MOS: Computer Technology

Slip Stream is a fictional character from the G.I. Joe: A Real American Hero toyline, comic books and animated series. He is the G.I. Joe Team's Conquest X-30 pilot and debuted in 1986.

== Profile ==
His real name is Gregory B. Boyajian, and his rank is that of 1st Lieutenant, USAF O-2. Slip Stream was born in Provo, Utah.

Slip Stream's primary military specialty is fighter pilot, and his secondary military specialty is computer technology. Slip Stream was an expert video game player and computer hacker but that changed when he discovered the joy of flying. As a teenager he was part of the Jr. Civil Air Patrol, and then through participation in the R.O.T.C. he earned his Air Force commission, where he was top of his flight school class. Slip Stream is able to speak Armenian, Greek, and French, and specializes in aircraft that use computer assisted control surfaces, where his knowledge of computers and lightning reflexes give him a competitive edge. He is also known to be proficient at table tennis, and has a reputation as a joker and mimic.

== Toys ==
Slip Stream was first released as an action figure in 1986, packaged with the Conquest X-30.

== Comics ==
=== Marvel Comics ===
In the Marvel Comics G.I. Joe series, Slip Stream debuted in issue #49 (July 1986). He made ten appearances in the Special Missions spinoff series, second only to Wild Bill (eleven), with his first coming in issue #3 as part of a ground team sent in to steal an advanced fighter jet. He has another ground-based mission later. He works with Lt. Falcon and Psyche-Out; they rescue three Russian soldiers from an Afghanistan prison. Multiple layers of lies get the Russians to act as Joe agents and rescue a C.I.A. chief from an Iranian group.

Slip Stream is one of the Joe pilots selected to make a recon raid over Cobra Island to find out why so much equipment is being moved. He and his fellow pilots shoot down many Cobra pilots. He has a cameo as the co-pilot four issues later.

Slip Stream serves as a co-pilot for Ghostrider on a mission over the fictional country of Benzheen. Their craft does not survive but they achieve their objective, photographs of the Terror Drome being built in the middle of Benzheen City. Halfway through the issue, Slip Stream is erroneously referred to in the text as Dogfight, another Joe pilot featured in the first few pages of the issue.

=== Devil's Due ===
He appears in the Devil's Due 'Real American Hero' series in issue 25. He is one of many Joes sent to intervene in Cobra's second Civil War. He is seen on Cobra Island, in hand-to-hand combat with an enemy soldier.

== Animated series ==
=== Sunbow ===
Slip-Stream first appeared in the Sunbow G.I. Joe animated series in the second-season episode "Arise, Serpentor, Arise!: Part I", voiced by Dan Gilvezan.

He is featured in the episode "In the Presence of Mine Enemies", in which he intercepts and records a Cobra command code, using it to destroy a satellite. He then battles several Cobra Night Ravens led by a female Strato-Viper, who demands him to surrender. Slip-Stream and the female pilot shoot each other down over a remote part of Africa. Slip-Stream saves the Strato-Viper, whom he calls Raven, before they find themselves targeted by B.A.T.s. Slip-Stream runs to a nearby abandoned lab carrying Raven. He splints her sprained ankle, and they look for a radio while escaping from the B.A.T.s. Slip-Stream and Raven soon encounter a monster that was the result of a failed experiment. Escaping, they find a communication center, where Slip-Stream contacts Dial-Tone for help. Using the command code, he programs the lab to self-destruct. Slip-Stream and Raven are rescued in time by the Joes.

=== G.I. Joe: The Movie ===
Slip Stream also appeared briefly in the 1987 animated film G.I. Joe: The Movie.
