= Psyche-Out =

- G.I. Joe character
- First appearance: G.I. Joe issue #64 (October 1987)

In-universe information
- Affiliation: G.I. Joe
- Specialty: Deceptive Warfare Specialist
- File name: Kenneth D. Rich
- Birth place: San Francisco, California
- Rank: O-2 (First Lieutenant) (1987); O-3 (Captain) (1991)
- Primary MOS: Psy-Ops
- Secondary MOS: Social Services Counselor
- Subgroups: Night Force

Psyche-Out is a fictional character from the G.I. Joe: A Real American Hero toyline, comic books and animated series of the 1980s. He is the G.I. Joe Team's deceptive warfare specialist and debuted in 1987.

== Profile ==
His real name is Kenneth D. Rich, and his rank is that of Captain O-3. Psyche-Out was born in San Francisco, California.

Psyche-Out's primary military specialty is psy-ops, and his secondary military specialty is social services counselor. He earned his psychology degree at Berkeley and spent time working on several research projects experimenting with stimulating paranoia using low frequency radio waves. He enlisted in the Army and received a post to the Deceptive Warfare Center at Fort Bragg, and there continued to work in the field of behavior modification using waves.

== Toys ==
Psyche-Out was first released as an action figure in 1987.

The figure was repainted and released as part of the Night Force line in 1988, packaged with Tunnel Rat.

A new version of Psyche-Out was released as part of the Super Sonic Fighters line in 1991. When this figure was released the character received a promotion from (First Lieutenant) O-2 to (Captain) O-3.

== Comics ==
=== Marvel Comics ===
In the Marvel Comics G.I. Joe series, he first appeared in issue #64. He joins the team with multiple Joes, including the undercover specialist Chuckles. The two had not quite gotten the clearance to know that there is anything below ground at the new Joe base. They do not understand and are highly suspicious of clues pointing to the official Joe space shuttle, the USS Defiant. Multiple Joes appearing from a secret trapdoor did not help. He appears in #67 to help assist in the difficult tensions that arise when the captured Joes, Quick-Kick, Snow-Job and Stalker finally return. He "suggests" that Scarlett and Snake Eyes' defiance of orders that led to the trio's safe return was mental instability caused by a close call with a "land mine" (actually, a rigged explosion).

Psyche-Out provides analysis when a Joe team sets up a Sierra Gordo terrorist group to attack the New York Cobra Consulate building. Psyche-Out provides advice based on overhead communications; this allows the team to successfully plant spy equipment inside the building.

Psyche-Out, Lt. Falcon and Slip Stream go in on foot to Afghanistan to acquire and trick three Russian prisoners into rescuing a C.I.A. chief. Both groups end up tricking each other. Psyche-Out is also accused of (and admits to) being overeager in analyzing his teammates.

Psyche-Out leads a secondary assault team during the Cobra Island civil war. They lose one vehicle, the Slugger, in the swamps, but make their objective, the neutralization of the western defense line.

=== Devil's Due ===
Psyche-Out makes a cameo in the Devil's Due Joe series. He is one of many Joes that have been called back to active duty to face the renewed threat of Cobra. The Joes are spread out to many separate bases; all with cover disguises. Psyche-Out is seen working out of the Joe's 'Americana Museum' sub-base. Later, following the return of Serpentor and the fall of The Coil, he was seen evaluating the young child clones of Serpentor, who were now in the custody of the U.S. government. Psyche-Out assists in routing Joe assets all across the world after Cobra has caused planet-wide damage.

=== IDW ===
He is seen supervising a Cobra prisoner at the new desert location of the P.I.T.

Psyche-Out is placed in charge of prisoner interrogation during a plan to retake Joe HQ back from Cobra control.

In a separate continuity, he is killed in a battle with Cobra BATs in a Cobra Underwater facility after capture by the Baroness and Interrogator.

=== G.I. Joe (2019) ===
In this alternate universe series, also from IDW, Psyche-Out is a civilian therapist working with military veterans suffering from PTSD. At this time, Cobra is not a problem, the world believes them to be a defense company.

== Animated series ==
=== DiC ===
Psyche-Out appeared in the DiC G.I. Joe animated series.
