= List of G.I. Joe: A Real American Hero characters =

This is an alphabetical list of G.I. Joe: A Real American Hero characters. For Cobra characters and those that are in their factions, see List of Cobra (G.I. Joe) characters.

== G.I. Joe Team ==
The following are members of the G.I. Joe Team:

=== Ace ===
Ace is the G.I. Joe Team's original fighter pilot. His real name is Brad J. Armbruster, and his rank is Air Force captain O-3. Ace was born in Providence, Rhode Island. His primary military specialty is fixed wing pilot, and his secondary military specialty is intelligence operations. He spent time flying pipelines and flying stunt planes for films before enlisting in the United States Air Force, and later transferred to the G.I. Joe team. Prior to joining the Joes, he worked as a senior instructor for the USAF Fighter Weapons Squadron "Aggressors" (pilot combat training school).

Ace was released in 1983 packaged with the "Sky Striker" fighter jet. A new figure was released as part of the 1992 "Battle Copters" line, with his name changed to "Wendall Armbruster". The figure was repainted and released as part of the "Battle Corps" line in 1993, packaged with the "Ghoststriker" X-16 fighter jet. In the United Kingdom Action Force toyline, Ace was first released in 1985, then rereleased in 1987 with his hometown changed to Montreal, Quebec, Canada.

In the Marvel Comics G.I. Joe: A Real American Hero series, Ace debuts in issue #14 (August 1983). He is featured in issue #34 (April 1985), where he battles the Cobra pilot Wild Weasel in a dogfight over New Jersey. Both pilots run out of missiles and ammunition, and the fight ends in a stalemate. After G.I. Joe disbands following the series' end in 1994, Ace returns to stunt flying. When the team reforms in 2001 in the Devil's Due Publishing comic series, he rejoins on reserve status.

=== Agent Faces ===
Agent Faces is the G.I. Joe Team's infiltrator. His real name is Michelino J. Paolino, and he was born in Parma, Ohio. Agent Faces was first released as an action figure in 2003, in a two-pack with Zartan.

His primary military specialty is fighting. His secondary military specialty is intelligence. Agent Faces was born with an uncanny talent for mimicry. After doing a brutally accurate impression of his first sergeant during basic training, he was sent to a top-secret intelligence school. There, he learned the tricks of cloak and dagger, and the use of advanced makeup and disguise techniques.

Agent Faces appears in the direct-to-video CGI animated movie G.I. Joe: Spy Troops, voiced by Ward Perry.

=== Agent Helix ===
Agent Helix is a covert operations officer with advanced martial arts training and expert marksmanship. Her favorite weapons are dual 10mm Auto pistols. An Olympic-class gymnast, her distinctive "Whirlwind attack" is an overpowering combination of kicks and firepower.

Agent Helix appears as a playable character in the G.I. Joe: The Rise of Cobra video game, voiced by Nancy Truman. She was designed by Mayan Escalante, a character artist at Double Helix Games, as an un-lockable character in the video game. She then became an action figure in the 2009 edition of the toyline.

=== Airborne ===
Airborne is the codename for several G.I. Joe members:

==== Franklin E. Talltree ====
Airborne is the G.I. Joe Team's helicopter assault trooper. His real name is Franklin E. Talltree, and his rank is that of sergeant E-5. Airborne was born in a Navajo reservation in Arizona. His primary military specialty is an airborne infantryman, while his secondary military specialty is helicopter gunship gunner.

Airborne was first released as an action figure in 1983. The same figure was included in a 1986 "Original Team" mail-in offer. A new figure was released based on the 2003 animated film G.I. Joe: Spy Troops in which the character did not appear.

He debuts in issue #11 of the Marvel Comics series, flying a glider against Cobra forces threatening the Alaskan Pipeline.

Airborne was voiced by Peter Cullen in the 1985 Sunbow animated series, first appearing in the miniseries "A Real American Hero". He was voiced by Phil Hayes in the 1989 DiC animated series.

==== Robert M. Six ====
A second Airborne was released as part of the Sky Patrol line in 1990. His real name is Robert M. Six, and he was born in Lake Geneva, Wisconsin. He is the "Sky Patrol" parachute assembler, and once the patrol is safely on the ground, he becomes their combat medic.

Airborne appears in the DiC G.I. Joe series, voiced by Phil Hayes.

=== Airtight ===
Airtight is the G.I. Joe Team's hostile environment specialist. His real name is Kurt Schnurr, and his rank is that of corporal E-4. Airtight was born in New Haven, Connecticut. He is a trained expert in chemical weaponry, and is able to detect, identify, neutralize and contain viruses and poisons. His primary military specialty is CBRN (Chemical, Biological, Radiological, and Nuclear) specialist, and his secondary military specialty is ordnance. He is noted for being a practical joker.

Airtight was first released as an action figure in 1985. The Brazilian release of the figure, called Ar Puro ("Pure Air"), was released in 1990. A new figure was released in 2008 as a "Direct to Consumer" figure for the G.I. Joe 25th Anniversary line.

Airtight first appears in issue #44 (February 1986) of the Marvel Comics G.I. Joe: A Real American Hero series. He is part of a training mission in the Nevada desert for prospective Joes being conducted by Lady Jaye, and when the group is attacked by Cobra forces using new mutant plant spores, he destroys them with battery acid. He is additionally featured in the second issue (December 1986) of the Special Missions series as part of a unit sent to neutralize an old World War II plane partially stuck inside a glacier and threatening to release a toxic cloud that risks endangering lives. In the 2001 Devil's Due Publishing continuity, Airtight returns to duty in the US Army as a CBR Warfare Specialist following the disbandment of G.I. Joe, and was eventually promoted to Sergeant E-5. He is called back to active reserve status upon reinstatement of the team in the event his skills are needed for a future mission.

In the UK Action Force continuity, Kurt Schnurr hails from Munich, West Germany.

Pat Fraley voiced Airtight in the 1985 Sunbow animated series. Troy Baker voiced him in one episode of the 2010 animated series G.I. Joe: Renegades, in which Airtight is repackaged as a Cobra scientist who becomes infected with a virus he has partially created.

=== Airwave ===
Airwave is the G.I. Joe Team's audible frequency specialist. His real name is Cliff V. Mewett, and he was born in Louisville, Kentucky. The same name Cliff V. Mewett was also used a few years later for Colonel Courage, even though the character is African-American and born in a different city. Airwave was first released as an action figure in 1990, as part of the "Sky Patrol" line. He is the Sky Patrol communications specialist, and is also the Signal Corps Adjutant to the Joint Chiefs of Staff. He is noted for being able to gain a signal where few others can.

Airwave appears in the DiC G.I. Joe series, voiced by Michael Benyaer.

=== Alpine ===
Alpine is the G.I. Joe Team's mountain trooper and debuted in 1985. His real name is Albert M. Pine, and his rank is that of corporal E-4. Alpine was born in Minidoka, Idaho. All subsequent releases of Alpine list his rank as that of Sergeant E-5 only the 1985 release listed his Rank as Corporal E-4.

He grew up in the "Snake River Plain", where mountains surrounded on all four sides. This affected his childhood, and he took up mountain climbing as a symbolic representation of overcoming his life. He continued this while working as an accountant for a large publishing firm. Alpine graduated from Ranger School at Fort Benning, and is a qualified expert with M-16, M-14, M-60 and M-1911A1 auto pistol.

Alpine is an expert climber, having mastered the challenge of climbing encumbered with weapons, armor, ammunition, communications equipment and other military gear. He has also made good use of his secondary military specialty, applying his refined approach to bookkeeping as a finance clerk. Alpine likes to remind his teammates that the FBI has apprehended more bad guys through accounting, than by kicking down doors. During his time with G.I. Joe, Alpine has also forged a strong friendship with Bazooka.

=== Altitude ===
Altitude is the G.I. Joe Team's recon scout. His real name is John Edwards Jones, and he was born in Cambria, California. Altitude was first released as an action figure in 1990, as part of the "Sky Patrol" line. He is a full-blooded Apache. He joined the military after his budding artistic career was cut short by the collapse of the syndicated cartoon industry. Altitude uses his photographic memory and drawing skills to bring back intelligence as a recon scout.

Altitude appears in the Devil's Due G.I. Joe series. He is part of the assault team sent to Cobra Island to destroy the forces of the revived Serpentor.

Altitude appears in the DiC G.I. Joe series, voiced by Terry Klassen.

=== Ambush ===
Ambush is the G.I. Joe Team's concealment specialist. His real name is Aaron McMahon, and he was born in Walnut, California. Ambush was first released as an action figure in 1990. There was a "Dinosaur Hunter" release in 1993. A new version of "Aaron 'Ambush' McMahon" was released in 2004 as part of a Toys "R" Us-exclusive "Desert Patrol Squad" set.

In the Marvel Comics G.I. Joe series, Ambush debuted in issue #111 as part of an advance recon team that was sent to the fictional Middle Eastern country of Benzheen. In the Devil's Due series, Ambush is seen as one of the many Joes interfering in the second Cobra civil war. His infiltration skills are put to use when a Joe team investigates hostile corporate instances in the fictional Eastern European country of Darklonia.

Ambush was voiced by Andrew Koenig and Ian James Corlett in the DiC G.I. Joe animated series.

=== Armadillo ===
Armadillo is the G.I. Joe Team's driver of the Rolling Thunder vehicle. His real name is Philo R. Makepeace, and his rank is E-7 (Sergeant First Class). Armadillo was born in Fort Huachuca, Arizona, and was first released as an action figure in 1988 with the "Rolling Thunder" missile launcher.

His primary military specialty is that of armored assault vehicle driver. His secondary military specialty is advanced reconnaissance. Prior to his military career, he used to drive semi trucks, before his aggressive driving style got him into trouble.

In the Marvel Comics G.I. Joe series, the character Armadillo was called Rumbler. His first appearance was in issue #80, when he helped the G.I. Joe team to keep Cobra Command from claiming a newly formed island near the original Cobra Island. However, just as the battle was over, the island sank back beneath the waves. He later participated in a secret mission to rescue captured Joes and members of the Oktober Guard from Sierra Gordo. He participates in the Battle of Benzheen.

In Marvel UK's Action Force comic, Armadillo appeared in G.I. Joe Annual 1992, as part of a team sent the fictional country of Sao Cristobel. The mission is to keep Cobra from acquiring a nuclear warhead.

=== Avalanche ===
Avalanche (real name Sgt. Ian M. Costello) is the G.I. Joe team's cold weather specialist who drives the "Dominator" vehicle. It's said that he was a poacher when young. He is KIA in G.I. Joe: A Real American Hero #113 while maneuvering through an oil field, when it is bombed by Cobra Commander.

=== Backblast ===
Backblast is the G.I. Joe Team's Anti-aircraft soldier. His real name is Edward J. Menninger, and his rank is that of Sergeant E-5. Backblast was born in New York City, New York. His primary military specialty is air defense, and his secondary military specialty is signal corps.

Backblast was first released as an action figure in 1989. The figure was repainted and released as part of the Battle Corps line in 1993. Different versions of the character were released in 2004 and 2005.

In the Marvel Comics G.I. Joe series, he first appeared in issue #92 as part of a covert team of Joes sent into the fictional country of Sierra Gordo. They successfully rescue Shockwave, Recondo and Falcon, as well as the surviving members of the Oktober Guard. In the Devil's Due Publishing continuity, Backblast is seen as one of the many Joes fighting against the new army created by Serpentor. This conflict takes place on Cobra Island.

Backblast is a playable character in the 2009 G.I. Joe: The Rise of Cobra video game voiced by Chopper Bernet.

=== Back-Stop ===
Back-Stop is the G.I. Joe Team's Persuader tank driver. His real name is Robert A. Levin. Back-Stop was born in Montreal, Quebec, Canada. His primary military specialty is armor, and his secondary military specialty is mechanized infantry.

In the Marvel Comics G.I. Joe: A Real American Hero series, he debuted in issue #64 (October 1987) as part of a new group of Joes meeting at their secret headquarters, The Pit. They are not informed of the top-secret aspects of the Joe team right away, such as the underground complex and the space shuttle, the USS Defiant, as their top-secret clearances had not caught up to them yet. Back-Stop appears in only one panel with his face obscured in shadow.

The 2009 Canadian G.I. Joe convention had a limited edition box set that included a 25th Anniversary Back-Stop figure and a comic book. The use of the trademarked character was approved by Hasbro.

=== Banzai ===
Banzai is the G.I. Joe Team's Rising Sun ninja and member of Ninja Force. His real name is Robert J. Travalino. His primary military specialty is first-strike commando. His secondary military specialty is nunchaku instructor. His birthplace is Hartsdale, New York. Banzai trained with a reclusive ninja master in the hostile mountains Tibet for some time. He is noted for training while blind-folded.

=== Barbecue ===
Barbecue is the G.I. Joe Team's firefighter. His real name is Gabriel A. Kelly, and his rank is that of corporal E-4. Barbecue was born in Boston, Massachusetts. His primary military specialty is fireman, and his secondary military specialty is infantry. He was in line to be the seventh Kelly from his family line to join the Boston Fire Department, but opted to join G.I. Joe instead.

Barbecue was first released as an action figure in 1985. The figure was repainted and released as part of the 1989 "Slaughter's Marauders" line, and the 1992 "Eco-Warriors" line. New figures were released in 2008 for the G.I. Joe 25th Anniversary line, and in 2009 for the G.I. Joe: The Rise of Cobra line. Barbecue was added to the UK Action Force toyline in 1987, with his name changed to "Gabriel A. Garibaldi" and his hometown to Naples, Italy.

In the Marvel Comics G.I. Joe series, Barbecue debuts in issue #40 (October 1985), where he is part of a team of Joes assigned to erect a transportable air-sea base in the Gulf of Mexico. In the 2001 Devil's Due Publishing continuity, he is accepted back on reserve status for special missions after G.I. Joe reforms.

Barbecue was voiced by Loren Lester in the 1985 Sunbow animated series, Lee Jeffrey in the 1989 DiC series, and Jerry O'Connell in the 2010 series G.I. Joe: Renegades.

=== Barrel Roll ===
Barrel Roll is the G.I. Joe Team's high-altitude sniper. His real name is Dwight E. Stall, and he was born in Cincinnati, Ohio. Barrel Roll was first released as an action figure in 2003, and is the brother of both G.I. Joe Bombstrike and Cobra Black Out. A version of Barrel Roll with no accessories came with the Built to Rule Rising Tide, which followed the G.I. Joe: Spy Troops story line. The forearms and the calves of the figure sported places where blocks could be attached.

His primary military specialty is marksmanship instructor. His secondary military specialty is fixed-wing aircraft pilot. Barrel Roll pushes himself to practice daily on the sniper range. He is a crack shot, and a skilled HALO jumper and pilot. He can claim the high ground without being spotted, drifting in silently by glider or parachute, and then disappear into the underbrush, sitting absolutely still to align the perfect shot.

Barrel Roll appears in the direct-to-video CGI animated movie G.I. Joe: Spy Troops, voiced by Paul Dobson.

=== Barricade ===
Barricade is the G.I. Joe Team's bunker buster. His real name is Philip M. Holsinger. Barricade was born in Pittsburg, Kansas, and was first released as an action figure in 1992. His 1993 release was part of the Battle Corps line. In 2004, he was released as part of a Toys R Us exclusive "Anti-Venom Task Force" set. The story behind the Anti-Venom Task Force, is that they are G.I. Joe's response to Doctor Mindbender and Cobra Commander turning civilians into dangerous monsters.

His primary military specialty is bunker busting, i.e. penetrating hard targets. His secondary military specialty is the driver of the "Badger" vehicle. Barricade is also explicitly trained to fight enemy agents in city and urban areas.

=== Bazooka ===
Bazooka is the G.I. Joe Team's missile specialist and debuted in 1985.

His real name is David L. Katzenbogen, and his rank is that of sergeant. Bazooka was born in Hibbing, Minnesota. He was operating as an Abrams tank driver in the 3rd Armored Division, when he came to believe that they were too vulnerable to rocket launcher fire. He put in for a transfer as soon as possible. Bazooka trained at the Advanced Infantry School, Fort Benning, Armor School, Fort Knox, and is a qualified expert with Dragon Anti-Tank Missile, Milan System, LAW rocket system, recoilless rifle, and all Warsaw Pact RPG systems. He is noted for being a swift, strategic thinker.

Bazooka was first released as an action figure in 1985. The figure was repainted and released as part of the Tiger Force line in 1988. A new version of Bazooka was released in 1993 as part of the Battle Corps line.

Another version was released in 2004 as "Sgt Bazooka", and packaged as the driver of the "Quickstrike" vehicle. This figure was repainted and released the same year without the vehicle, in a two-pack with Dreadnok Torch, as part of the Valor vs Venom line. In 2008, a new version of Sgt Bazooka was released, which was based heavily on the 1985 version.

In the Marvel Comics G.I. Joe series, he first appeared in issue #44 (February 1986). He is one of the many Joes to go underground after most of the team is arrested in order to cover up a public relations fiasco. The rogue Joes work to free General Hawk from murderous government agents who are holding him and another friendly general in a small clinic. Bazooka receives a minor bullet wound in the ensuing firefight. The entire Joe team is cleared of all charges.

In the UK-based Action Force line of comics, Bazooka makes his debut fighting hand-to-hand with Crimson Guard forces. This is part of a Joe team effort to destroy a secret Cobra hideout using a fast food restaurant as cover. Later, he battles Dreadnoks Ripper and Buzzer over the possession of an experimental laser weapon, and with the assistance of an elderly war veteran, he acquires the weapon but the Dreadnoks escape. He later finds out the device is worthless.

During G.I. Joe's seven-year hiatus, Bazooka becomes overweight and is working as a security guard. In later issues, he works his way back into fighting condition and reunites with Alpine, Mutt and Rock 'n Roll. They have met up in Alpine's new hometown of Delhi Hills, and discover it is a hotspot of Cobra activity. In issue #16, Bazooka defeats Cobra's drill sergeant Big Boa in personal combat. Despite the large amount of destruction, mostly caused by Bazooka, there is no evidence of any enemy activity when Joe backup arrives. The foursome's veteran status is enough for them to be believed. Their reports are later verified, when an anonymous report leads to Cobra operatives in Delhi Hills being captured by a Joe team. Bazooka is later seen battling Cobra soldiers in Colombia.

Bazooka is a peripheral character in the 2010 IDW Publishing reboot of the G.I. Joe series. He, along with Scarlett and Duke, are tasked with a mission to protect Dr. Gerald Orizama from a Cobra abduction plot. During Black Out's extraction of the doctor, Bazooka is shot dead in a hallway. He is mourned by fellow Joes back at The Pit, with his trademark #14 football jersey framed and hung on the wall, while Stalker says a tribute to him.

Bazooka appears in G.I. Joe: A Real American Hero (1983), voiced by John Hostetter.

Bazooka appears in G.I. Joe: Resolute, where he is murdered by Storm Shadow.

=== Beach Head ===
Beach Head (real name: Wayne R. Sneeden), introduced in 1986, is a U.S. Army Ranger and later the sergeant major of the G.I. Joe team.

Born into abject poverty in Auburn, Alabama, Beach Head was bullied to his low economic-status for much of his youth. However, rather than letting this wear him down, he devoted himself to rising above and beyond his environment, to be the best he could possibly be. Ultimately, Beach Head became the star of his high school, in both athletics and academia. He even became his high school's valedictorian.

Beach Head was a lane instructor at the Ranger School in Fort Benning as well as an advisor at the Covert Ops School in Central America. Known for his strict discipline and demanding training routines, he is both respected and feared by recruits. He is meticulous, patient, and strong-willed. Beach Head doesn't get mad because he thinks it is a waste of energy . . . what he does is get even (and he is very good at that). The only thing that irritates him among his comrades is when they don't try their hardest to get the job done. Nothing irks Beach Head like apathy.

Beach Head has appeared across multiple toy lines, including the 25th Anniversary series, and in various comics published by Marvel, Devil's Due, and IDW. In animation, he debuted in the second season of the Sunbow series, voiced by William Callaway, and has appeared in G.I. Joe: The Movie (1987), Spy Troops (2003), and Valor vs. Venom (2004).

=== Big Ben ===
Big Ben is the G.I. Joe Team's SAS Fighter. His real name is David J. Bennett, and his rank is that of Staff Sergeant. Big Ben was born in Burford, England, and was first released as an action figure in 1991. The figure was repainted and released in 1993 as part of the "international Action Force" mail-in offer. Other repainted releases came in 2000 packaged in a two-pack with Whiteout, and two different versions in 2002, packaged in a double-pack with an Alley Viper figure.

Big Ben received training at Bradbury Barracks in Hereford, before becoming a cadre member at the NATO Long Range Recon Patrol School in West Germany. He is a member of the 22nd Regiment of the British Special Air Service, on his second assignment with the G.I. Joe Team, as part of a temporary exchange program between American Special Forces and the British SAS. His primary military specialty is infantry, with a secondary of subversive operations.

In the Marvel Comics G.I. Joe series, he assists the Joes in defending Destro, when the allied group is entrenched in Destro's Trans-Carpathian castle. He also appears in issue #137.

In the Devil's Due G.I. Joe series, he assists the Joes when they invade Cobra Island to interfere in their second civil war.

Big Ben appears in the DiC G.I. Joe series, voiced by Maurice LaMarche.

=== Big Brawler ===
Big Brawler is the code name of Brian K. Mulholland. He is the G.I. Joe Team's jungle mission specialist, and was first released as an action figure in 2001. A new version with red hair was released in 2003, in a Tiger Force five-pack exclusive to Toys R Us stores. His specialties are counter-intelligence and espionage, and he is a master of both psychological warfare and hand-to-hand combat. When it came to terrorist attacks orchestrated by the Cobra Organization, Big Brawler transferred from the Army Intelligence to the G.I. Joe Team.

=== Big Lob ===
Big Lob is a former basketball player who speaks in sports commentator jargon. His real name is Bradley J. Sanders and he was born in Chicago, Illinois.

Big Lob first appeared in G.I. Joe: The Movie, voiced by Brad Sanders. He is established as a member of the "Rawhides", a group of new Joe recruits (including Falcon, Chuckles, Jinx, Law & Order and Tunnel Rat) trained by Beach Head.

Big Lob had no action figure or comic book counterpart until 2010, when his figure became available as a G.I. Joe Club exclusive. He was listed as a reserve member of G.I. Joe during the America's Elite comic series, and is seen on a map as having been deployed as part of the Joes' efforts to battle Cobra Commander's forces worldwide during the "World War III" storyline. His primary military specialty is Infantry / Grenadier, and his secondary military specialty is Public Affairs Specialist.

=== Blast-Off ===
Blast-Off is the G.I. Joe Team's flamethrower. His real name is Jeffrey D. Thompson, and he was born in Kirkwood, Missouri. Blast-Off was first released as an action figure in 1993, as part of the "Mega Marines" subset. The Mega-Marines are several Joes teaming up to battle Cobra-allied monsters. His figure came with "moldable bio-armor".

His primary military specialty is flamethrower. His secondary military specialty is firefighter. He is recruited into the G.I. Joe Team from his firefighting job, after he single-handedly put out an entire forest fire. When it is discovered that the "Mega-Monsters", a recently emerging threat, are vulnerable to fire, Blast-Off is assigned to the "Mega-Marine" team under the command of Gung-Ho. His other squad-mates are Clutch and Mirage.

=== Blaster ===
Blaster (real name Sgt. Brian R. Davis) is the G.I. Joe team's ground effect vehicle operator who operates the "Vindicator" hovercraft. He loves to design hovercraft, and is a fan of loud rock and roll music.

He is KIA in G.I. Joe: A Real American Hero #113 while maneuvering through an oil field, when it is bombed by Cobra Commander.

=== Blizzard ===
Blizzard is the G.I. Joe Team's arctic attack soldier. His real name is Gregory M. Natale, and his rank is that of Sergeant First Class E-7. Blizzard was born in Wolfeboro, New Hampshire (spelled "Wolfboro" on the action figure's file card), and was first released as an action figure in 1988. In 1991, he was one of six exclusive European releases under the "Tiger Force" line. In 1997, he was released as part of an "Arctic Mission" triple pack with Iceberg and Snow-Job.

Blizzard's primary military specialty is Arctic warfare training instructor, and his secondary military specialty is infantry. Blizzard led an experimental security team based at Thule, Greenland for an entire winter, whose objective it was to determine what kind of training and conditioning worked best to prepare trainees for combat in Arctic conditions. Blizzard's team found that training and conditioning had little effect, as only the hardest and meanest men made it through the course – of which Blizzard was the hardest and meanest. He is noted by his teammates as being difficult to work with, though his success record makes up for it.

Blizzard is featured as a playable character in the 1991 G.I. Joe video game created for the Nintendo Entertainment System. His special power is being able to fire weapon-shots through walls.

=== Blocker ===
Blocker (real name David B. McCarthy) is a mechanized recon member and special services member who used to work as a taxi cab driver.

He is KIA in G.I. Joe: A Real American Hero #113 while maneuvering through an oil field, when it is bombed by Cobra Commander.

=== Blowtorch ===
Blowtorch is the G.I. Joe Team's original flamethrower specialist and debuted in 1984.

His real name is Timothy P. Hanrahan, and his rank is that of corporal (E-4). Blowtorch was born in Tampa, Florida.

Blowtorch's primary military specialty is infantry special weapons, and as his secondary military specialty he is a small-arms armorer. He is familiar with all incendiary devices used by the military, as well as their flame projection equipment, pyrotechnics and heat-projection devices. He is a qualified expert with the M-7 Flamethrower, M-16 and the M1911A1 Auto Pistol. Blowtorch also studied for advanced degrees in both structural and chemical engineering.

In the UK's Action Force, Blowtorch comes from Toulouse in France and "knows all there is to know about flame projection and incendiary devices. He has seen the damage fire can do and is scared by it. Has to sleep near a smoke detector."

In the Marvel Comics G.I. Joe series, he first appeared in issue #32, assisting Ripcord and Clutch in moving supplies, for a party to celebrate the reconstruction of G.I. Joe headquarters. In the next issue, Spirit convinces Blowtorch and Ripcord to sneak him out of the infirmary to the local mall. Spirit believes he can purchase more efficient medicines at the floral shop than they have in the infirmary. This unofficial mission leads the three Joes in a running battle, as the man who had wounded Spirit was also on a shopping trip. The trio are hailed as heroes by the other Joes, when a coincidence allows them to come back with the much needed party decorations.

Blowtorch is active in the Devil's Due G.I. Joe series. He and Gung-Ho go undercover at an obscure federal prison, to help Chuckles escape the notice of Cobra. Acting as guards, they stage Chuckles' death, and then escort him to a safe house staffed by Joe agents. They then leave to enjoy a two-week vacation in New Orleans. He later takes part in battling Cobra and the Coil on Cobra Island.

Blowtorch appears in G.I. Joe: A Real American Hero (1983), voiced by Michael Bell.

Blowtorch appears in the 1985 G.I. Joe: A Real American Hero computer game.

Blowtorch appears in the Find Your Fate G.I. Joe book "Operation: Star Raider".

=== Bombstrike ===
Bombstrike (real name Alyssa Renee Stall) is a forward air control and counterintelligence specialist who never misses her targets. She is the brother of Barrel Roll and Black Out. When Bombstrike went missing during an attack on a Cobra base, Barrel Roll saw Black Out among their ranks and assumed that he was responsible for her abduction causing G.I. Joe to work on their side mission to find Bombstrike and bring her home.

=== Breaker ===
Breaker is the G.I. Joe Team's original communications officer and debuted in 1982.

His real name is Alvin R. Kibbey, and his rank is that of corporal E-4. Breaker was born in Gatlinburg, Tennessee.

Breaker knows how to use all NATO and Warsaw Pact communication gear, and is also familiar with most world export devices. His primary military specialty is Infantry, and as his secondary military specialty he is a radio telecommunications technician. His specialized education includes Signal School, where he studied covert electronics and was involved with Project GAMMA. He is a qualified expert in the M-16, M-1911A1, and MAC-10 (Ingram). Breaker is described as "efficient and self-assured, and has an uncanny ability to turn adverse situations to his favor." He also speaks seven languages.

Breaker is the link between the battlefield and headquarters and has the ability to call in an air strike, provide artillery coordinates, request a Med-Evac or find an extraction site. Breaker constantly monitors all radio frequencies, providing situation reports to the command center. He also has the ability to crack enemy codes and to jam their transmissions. He is well liked by his teammates, although he has a habit of chewing bubble gum in any situation.

In the UK Action Force toy series, Breaker is from Munich in Germany.

Breaker was first released as an action figure in 1982. All of the original sixteen figures from 1982 were released with "straight arms." The same figure was re-released in 1983 with "swivel-arm battle grip", which made it easier for figures to hold their rifles and accessories.

In Argentina, straight-arm Breaker was recolored in gray and available as "Topson". A version of Breaker nearly identical to the U.S. version was released in Argentina as "Roger" and in Brazil as "Falcon".

A new version of Breaker was released in 1997, as part of the "Stars and Stripes Forever" boxed set.

Figures of the character in the 25th Anniversary line include a bubblegum bubble accessory. To coincide with the launch of the movie G.I. Joe: The Rise of Cobra, Hasbro released a figure in 2009 based on the Breaker movie character, listed as Abel "Breaker" Shaz.

In the Marvel Comics G.I. Joe series, Breaker first appeared in issue #1 (June 1982), along with the rest of the original team, in a mission to rescue the peace activist Dr. Adele Burkhart from a Cobra stronghold. Breaker's last appearance is in issue #109, where he is killed in battle.

Breaker appears in the G.I. Joe animated series, voiced by Chris Latta.

Breaker appears in G.I. Joe: Renegades, voiced by Greg Ellis. This version is a college student who used to work for SSS Market until he was fired after being accused of stealing one of their scanners. Alvin starts an anti-Cobra blog under the alias Coyote.

Breaker appears in G.I. Joe: The Rise of Cobra, portrayed by Saïd Taghmaoui. In the movie, his name was changed to Abel Shaz, and he was a member of the Moroccan military before joining G.I. Joe.

Breaker appears as a non-playable character in the video game G.I. Joe: The Rise of Cobra, voiced by Charles Fathy.

=== Budo ===
Budo is the G.I. Joe Team's samurai warrior. His real name is Kyle A. Jesso, and his rank is that of sergeant E-5. Budo was born in Sacramento, California, and was first released as an action figure in 1988.

Budo's primary military specialty is infantry, and his secondary military specialty is hand-to-hand combat instructor. Budo's father was an orthodontist in Oakland, his grandfather a farmer in Fresno, his great-grandfather a track-worker on the Rocky Mountain Line, and his great-great-grandfather was a fencing master in one of Japan's last great samurai warrior families. Budo was given the family swords on his eighteenth birthday, as well as a haiku written by his ancestor. Budo has a fifth-degree black belt in Iaidō, and similar rank in Karate, Judo, and Jujutsu. He has an affinity for his chopped, pan-head Harley and for heavy metal music.

In the Marvel Comics G.I. Joe series, he first appeared in issue #82. He has just joined the Joe with Repeater and Lightfoot. Their veteran instructor Grand Slam is injured leaving the three to defend a weapons depot from enemy forces.

In the Devil's Due series, Budo has an interrupted romantic relationship with Jinx. He also spends some time undercover, infiltrating and partially converting a Japanese businessman's private army. Gung-Ho and Wild Bill assist in this mission. His efforts save Japan from a military takeover.

=== Bullet-Proof ===
Bullet-Proof is the G.I. Joe Team's Drug Elimination Force leader. His real name is Earl S. Morris. He was born in Chicago, Illinois, and was first released as an action figure in 1992, as part of the DEF (Drug Elimination Force) line. He was released in 1993 with the Battle Corps line.

In addition to leading the G.I. Joe DEF (Drug Elimination Force), he is also an official U.S. Marshal. Before being assigned to the G.I. Joe team, he served with the Drug Enforcement Administration in the Caribbean, the "Golden Triangle" and Central America. His code name resulted from his enemies, as they observed how he remained unscathed while leading his men through firefights.

In the Marvel Comics G.I. Joe series, he first appeared in issue #124. He also appeared in #125 and #127. As part of the DEF, he helps eliminate the drug trade from the town of Broca Beach without realizing the entire town was a Cobra front. The DEF also confront the enemy operatives Headman and his Headhunters.

Bullet-Proof appears in the DiC G.I. Joe animated series, voiced by Alvin Sanders.

=== Bullhorn ===
Bullhorn is the G.I. Joe Team's hostage negotiator. His real name is Stephen A. Ferreira. He was born in Providence, Rhode Island, and was first released as an action figure in 1990. Version 2 was released in 2008 for the International G.I. Convention which was held in Dallas, Texas. It came with the transport called "S.W.A.T. R.T.V." This was produced in relation with the "Official G.I. Joe Collectors' Club".

Bullhorn taught hand to hand combat at the F.B.I. Academy in Qauntico, Virginia. He is also a contender for the "national practical pistol title", another skill practiced at the academy. He is noted as being a reckless driver.

Bullhorn appears in the DiC G.I. Joe animated series, voiced by David Wills.

=== Bushido ===
Bushido is the G.I. Joe Team's snow ninja and member of Ninja Force. His real name is Lloyd S. Goldfine. His primary military specialty is cold weather specialist. His secondary military specialty is strategist. His birthplace is Hollis, Queens, New York. He has trained in Iceland and continues to prefer to train in cold weather environments. He wears a helmet similar to the one his father wore. He considers fellow Ninja Force member Banzai his "blood brother".

=== Cannonball ===
Cannonball (real name John Warden) is a transportation specialist and infantry member who drives the R.H.I.N.O. While there are rumors that Cannonball used to work as a human cannonball, he cannot confirm or deny it. Though he did do some test-driving on some trucks before joining the military.

=== Captain Grid-Iron ===
Captain Grid-Iron is the G.I. Joe Team's hand-to-hand combat specialist. His real name is Terrence Lydon, and his rank is that of captain O-3. Captain Grid-Iron was born in Evergreen Park, Illinois, and was first released as an action figure in 1990. He was released as part of the tradition of Hasbro to release a sports figure each year, starting with Bazooka in 1985. A recolored version was also released in India.

Grid-Iron was quarterback for the West Point football team. He graduated in the top ten of his class. He passed up an appointment to the U.S. Army War college, for a conventional infantry command at the company level. His determination to be "where the action is" brought him to the attention of G.I. Joe. According to his file card, his personality is grating, but tolerable. The other Joes think if he would stop trying so hard to be likable, "they might let him play quarterback at the annual G.I. Joe Fish Fry Football Game!"

Grid-Iron makes a single panel appearance in issue No. 130 of the Marvel Comics series. He is seen defending G.I. Joe headquarters from Cobra attack. Years later he appears on the cover to the Devil's Due series America's Elite #25. He is listed as a reservist in Special Missions: Manhattan. In G.I. Joe: America's Elite #28, he is listed as fighting in the Sudan.

Captain Grid-Iron's most significant appearances were in the first-season of the DiC G.I. Joe animated series, voiced by Dale Wilson. His speech was peppered with football terminology. He was in charge of the team in the absence of General Hawk and Sgt. Slaughter, and took orders from both of them when they appeared. Grid-Iron was absent for most of the second season, but was featured in the second-season episode "Metal-Head's Reunion," which revealed that Grid-Iron and the Cobra officer Metal-Head both attended the same school.

Captain Grid-Iron is featured as a playable character in the 1991 G.I. Joe video game created for the Nintendo Entertainment System.

=== Chameleon ===
Chameleon is the illegitimate half-sister of the Baroness, who infiltrated the Cobra organization by assuming the Baroness' role. She serves as a secret agent and intelligence officer for G.I. Joe. She was introduced to the toyline when Hasbro lost the trademark to the Baroness' name.

=== Charbroil ===
Charbroil is the G.I. Joe Team's flamethrower. His real name is Carl G. Shannon, and his rank is that of corporal E-4. Charbroil was born in Blackduck, Minnesota, and was first released as an action figure in 1988. The figure was repainted and released as part of the "Night Force" line in 1989, packaged with Repeater. In 2004, he was part of a Toys R Us Exclusive "Anti-Venom Task Force", a G.I. Joe response team to enemy agents turning civilians into monsters. Charbroil had a new sculpt in 2009, as part of the line released for the G.I. Joe: The Rise of Cobra movie.

Charbroil's primary military specialty is flame weapons specialist, and his secondary military specialty is small arms armorer. One of his childhood chores was to heat the water pipes in his family's basement with a blowtorch in the winter to keep them from freezing and bursting. As a teenager, his job was to feed coal into the blast furnaces in the mills on the Great Lakes. As such, when he was recruited into the Army he requested a job dealing with open flames.

In the Marvel Comics G.I. Joe series, he first appeared in issue 80 (November 1988). He is part of a Joe effort to stop Cobra from claiming new territory forming near Cobra Island. The land mass eventually sinks on its own. In Special Missions #21, Charbroil is part of a G.I. Joe squad sent to investigate Cobra activity in the sewers of New York City along with Airtight, Spearhead & Max and Tunnel Rat.

In the Devil's Due G.I. Joe series, Charbroil is one of the many Joes called back into service to fight The Coil, a new army formed by the former Cobra agent, Serpentor. This mission again focuses on Cobra Island.

=== Checkpoint ===
Checkpoint (real name Jared Wade) is a Steel Brigade security personnel who was the only man to best Major Barrage.

=== Claymore ===
Claymore is the G.I. Joe Team's covert operations officer and debuted in 1986. His real name is John Zullo, and his rank is that of captain O-3. He has mastered many forms of martial arts and is fluent in Japanese, Chinese, Vietnamese, and Portuguese. When asked to join the G.I. Joes, his only stipulation was that he be called in for special assignments only.

Claymore was first released as an action figure in 1986 as an exclusive in a special set from Toys "R" Us named "Special Mission: Brazil", alongside recolored versions of Mainframe, Wet Suit, Leatherneck, and Dial Tone. The set included a cassette tape that detailed the secret mission.

=== Clean-Sweep ===
Clean-Sweep is the G.I. Joe Team's Anti-tox trooper. His real name is Daniel W. Price, and he was first released as an action figure in 1991, as part of the Eco-Warriors line. He is a U.S. Army Sergeant, and he was born in Elizabeth, New Jersey. He is a chemicals operation specialist and combat engineer. He is often called in to use his remote control devices to clean up Cobra chemical spills; the problem is that Cobra soldiers are often still around. His primary offensive weapon is a laser pistol.

In the Marvel Comics G.I. Joe series, he first appeared in issue #123. He becomes part of the "Eco-Warriors", assigned to stop environmental threats. With Flint, the team leader and Ozone, they confront the Cobra agent Cesspool, who was causing pollution from an abandoned oil platform.

Clean-Sweep appears in the DiC G.I. Joe animated series.

=== Cloudburst ===
Cloudburst is the G.I. Joe Team's glider trooper. His real name is Chuck Ram. He was born in San Diego, California, and was first released as an action figure in 1991, as part of the Air Commandos line. As a teenager, he designed and built his own working prototype gliders. After joining the Army, he helps develop stealth-gliders for troop-insertion and recon. He is now on special assignment to the G.I. Joe team as their in-house glider specialist. He's noted for constantly working on his equipment because he knows his services are a 'last resort' situation.

In the Marvel Comics G.I. Joe series, he is mentioned by name in issue No. 118, but not seen.

Cloudburst appears in the DiC G.I. Joe animated series.

=== Cold Front ===
Cold Front is the G.I. Joe Team's Avalanche driver. His real name is Charles Donahue. He was born in Fort Knox, Kentucky, and was first released as an action figure in 1990, packaged with the "Avalanche" arctic tank/hovercraft. This vehicle should not be confused with the G.I. Joe Battleforce 2000 character, also called Avalanche.

Cold Front's primary military specialty is Avalanche driver, and his secondary military specialty is fire control technician. He grew up literally close to the weapons testing facilities at the military base called Fort Knox, hearing the sounds of the M-80 tanks. This inspired a lifelong love of tanks. Self-taught strategy and his affiliation with military vehicles got him an assignment to the 3rd Armored Division when he enlisted in the Army at the age of eighteen. From the Army, he was reassigned to the G.I. Joe "Arctic Patrol". From there, he was picked by General Hawk to drive the Avalanche. He is noted for his poor treatment of civilian vehicles.

=== Colonel Courage ===
Colonel Courage is the G.I. Joe Team's strategic commander. His real name is Cliff V. Mewett, and he was born in Boston, Massachusetts. Colonel Courage was first released as an action figure in 1993, as part of the Battle Corps line. The name Cliff V. Mewett had been used a few years earlier for the character Airwave, though the character is Caucasian and born in a different city. A Brazil variant of Colonel Courage has him as a Caucasian.

His primary military specialty is administrative strategist. His secondary military specialty is Patriot driver. He is often assigned to intelligence tasks behind the lines and behind a desk, partly due to his attention to detail. This also translated into a noted tendency to dress well, something he tries to pass onto those he commands.

=== Countdown ===
Countdown is one of the G.I. Joe Team's astronauts. His real name is David D. Dubosky, and his rank is that of Captain, USAF O-3. Countdown was born in Plainfield, New Jersey, and was first released as an action figure in 1989. The figure was repainted and released as part of the Star Brigade line in 1993, and again in 1994.

Countdown's primary military specialty is astronaut/fighter pilot, and his secondary military specialty is electronics engineer. He is a qualified F-16 fighter pilot, a NASA astronaut, an electronics engineer, and even a ranking chess master.

In the Marvel Comics G.I. Joe series, he first appeared in issue No. 109 and again in No. 110. He takes part in a mission that launches a Joe vehicle into orbit and then into the fictional country of Trucial Absymia. The mission, which succeeds, is to rescue the survivors of a Joe squad that has suffered many fatalities.

=== Crankcase ===
Crankcase is the G.I. Joe team's A.W.E. Striker driver. His real name is Elwood G. Indiana, and he was born in Lawrence, Kansas. Crankcase's primary military specialty is motor vehicle driver, and his secondary military specialty is armor. He was first released as an action figure in 1985, packaged with the A.W.E. Striker vehicle.

Crankcase first appeared in G.I. Joe: A Real American Hero #44 (February 1986), but is among several Joes killed in action by a SAW Viper in issue #109.

=== Crazylegs ===
Crazylegs is the G.I. Joe Team's assault trooper and debuted in 1987. His real name is David O. Thomas, and his rank is that of corporal E-4. Crazylegs was born in Fort Dodge, Iowa. His primary military specialty is infantry, and his secondary military specialty is parachute rigger. Crazylegs could have been an organist but his fingers were too short; instead he applied for the Airborne Rangers with a willingness to jump from a helicopter into a dangerous landing zone. Aside from being Airborne Ranger qualified, he has also been cross-trained to function as a forward artillery observer.

Crazylegs was first released as an action figure in 1987. The figure was repainted and released as part of the "Night Force" line in 1988. In 2011, a figure based on his original 1987 design was released as part of Hasbro's "Pursuit of Cobra" toyline.

Crazylegs debuts in the Marvel comic series in 1988, in issues #69-71. He is one of several Joes killed in issue #109, when they escape a SAW Viper in a tank that is in turn hit by a COBRA Maggot vehicle.

=== Cross Hair ===
Cross Hair (real name Don G. Fardie) is an infantry soldier and marksmanship instructor.

=== Cross-Country ===
Cross-Country is the G.I. Joe Team's H.A.V.O.C. driver and debuted in 1986. His real name is Robert "Robbie" M. Blais, and his rank is that of sergeant E-5. Cross-Country was born in Greensboro, North Carolina. His primary military specialty is armor, and his secondary military specialty is heavy equipment operator. He was first released as an action figure in 1986 packaged with the H.A.V.O.C. (Heavy Articulated Vehicle Ordnance Carrier) vehicle.

The character first appears in issue #51 (September 1986) of the Marvel Comics series, when he and Sgt. Slaughter come into conflict with the Dreadnoks.

Cross-Country was voiced by Michael McConnohie in the 1985-86 Sunbow animated series.

=== Crossfire ===
Crossfire (real name Bill White) is a heavy weapons operator and demoltions expert.

=== Cutter ===
Cutter is the G.I. Joe Team's hovercraft pilot and debuted in 1984. His real name is Ronald "Skip" A. Stone, and his rank is that of Coast Guard lieutenant junior grade O-2. Cutter was born in Kinsley, Kansas. Cutter was first released as an action figure in 1984, packaged with the W.H.A.L.E. hovercraft.

Cutter's primary military specialty is hovercraft captain and his secondary military specialty is special services (he coached the women's swimming team at Annapolis). After trying unsuccessfully to get into Annapolis for two years, he instead joined the Coast Guard Academy at New London, Connecticut. Although his home town is in the central United States, Cutter always desired to live a life at sea. When he learned that the G.I. Joe Team had no members from the Coast Guard, he pressured the Coast Guard until they were able to arrange to get him on the team.

In the Marvel Comics G.I. Joe series, Cutter first appeared in issue #25 (July 1984) as the commander of the ship G.I. Jane.

=== Daemon ===
Daemon is the code name of Jeff Lacefield and has appeared in the Devil's Due Publishing comics. He was born in Cincinnati, Ohio, and developed an interest in computers at an early age. By the time he graduated from college at age 21, he had become quite a computer programmer and started to develop computer viruses in his spare time. When one of these viruses was inadvertently set loose in the FBI central computer system, he was tracked down and arrested. However, the Feds saw his abilities as a programmer, and instead of being sent to federal prison, Daemon was appointed to the reinstated G.I. Joe task force, to help them thwart the top-secret nano-mite technology that was stolen from the U.S. Army by Cobra. Daemon is killed when his neck is snapped by Serpentor during a battle with The Coil.

=== Dart ===
Dart is the G.I. Joe Team's pathfinder, and he was first released as an action figure in 2002. His real name is Jimmy Tall Elk, and his rank is that of sergeant E-6. Dart was born in White Earth, Minnesota.

Dart's primary military specialty is recon, and his secondary military specialty is infantry. He was a former hunting guide in Minnesota before joining the G.I. Joe team.

=== Dee-Jay ===
Dee-Jay is the code name of Thomas R. Rossi III. He was born in Providence, Rhode Island, and was the most popular DJ in Boston before he signed up for Battleforce 2000. His primary military specialty is radio telephone operator, and his secondary military specialty is infantry. Dee-Jay was first released as an action figure in 1989. Dee-Jay appeared in only issue #113 of the Marvel Comics G.I. Joe series, and was killed in that same issue.

=== Depth Charge ===
Depth Charge is the G.I. Joe Team's underwater demolitions expert. His real name is Petty Officer Third Class E-4 Nicolas H. Langdon, and he was born in Pittsburgh, Pennsylvania. first released as an action figure in 2003. He specializes in clearing mines and other devices in the water. Despite having some of the best scores in the history of the UDT program and loving his job, he hates water.

=== Dodger ===
Dodger (real name Richard Renwick) is an armored vehicle maintenance worker and electronics maintenance worker.

He is KIA in G.I. Joe: A Real American Hero #113 while maneuvering through an oil field, when it is bombed by Cobra Commander.

=== Dogfight ===
Dogfight is the G.I. Joe Team's Mudfighter pilot, and he was first released as an action figure in 1989, packaged with the Mudfighter bomber. His real name is James R. King, and his rank is that of 1st Lieutenant, USAF O-2. Dogfight was born in Providence, Rhode Island.

Dogfight's primary military specialty is Mudfighter pilot, and his secondary military specialty is electronics technician. The combination of his uncanny depth perception, precise hand/eye coordination, and powerful throwing arm got him permanently forbidden from every county fair and carnival in Alabama for winning too many stuffed bears. He now uses those same skills to destroy Cobra's vehicles.

In the Marvel Comics G.I. Joe series, he first appeared in G.I. Joe Special Missions #28. In that issue, Dogfight assists in saving the USS Flagg. In the same issue, he also breaks the "fourth wall" as part of a group addressing the reader. Later, Dogfight is the co-pilot for Ace during a recon mission over the supposedly friendly skies of Benzheen. Their craft is shot up off-panel by a Cobra Rattler. They escape to the awaiting aircraft carrier, the USS Flagg. Dogfight urges Ace to punch out. He does not, because he knows Dogfight's ejection system is shot to pieces and Ace could not live with knowing he abandoned his co-pilot. In the same issue, the pilots Slip-Stream and Ghostrider take another flight over Benzheen in a Stealth Fighter. Ghostrider and later, Hawk both refer to Slip-Stream as Dogfight.

Dogfight also appears in the America's Elite G.I. Joe series from Devil's Due. He is part of a small group of Joe pilots sent to assist European military forces. Despite expectations, they survive the mission. He also witnesses Iron Grenadier pilots suffering aircraft malfunctions.

=== Dojo ===
Dojo is the code name of Michael P. Russo. He was born in San Francisco, California. Impressed by his skills and integrity, Storm Shadow recruited Dojo for the G.I. Joe's new sub-team Ninja Force. He is noted for using "patter" to distract his opponents. He also prefers to drive the G.I. Joe vehicle "Brawler".

=== Double Blast ===
Double Blast is a heavy machine gunner for the G.I. Joe Team. He was named after Charles L. Griffith (a real-life G.I. Joe collector), and was released as an action figure in 2001. Double Blast was created to replace Roadblock when Hasbro temporarily lost the trademark to his name. He is characterized for his ability to assemble, disassemble, and reassemble a weapon in less than 60 seconds in the dark.

=== Downtown ===
Downtown is the G.I. Joe Team's mortar man, and he was first released as an action figure in 1989. His real name is Thomas P. Riley, and his rank is that of corporal E-4. Downtown was born in Cleveland, Ohio.

Downtown's primary military specialty is infantry, and his secondary military specialty is special operations. Downtown can keep up with a highly mobile, rapid strike force like G.I. Joe with his high-powered mortar, whereas slow, ponderous artillery cannot. He can judge range and trajectory just by eyesight.

In the America's Elite G.I. Joe series from Devil's Due, Downtown is one of the many Joes to take part in the second Cobra civil war, which again takes place on Cobra Island.

=== Dr. Link Talbot ===
Dr. Link Talbot (full name Lincoln B. Talbot) is a veterinarian and scientist that used to be a chief veterinarian at a national zoo. He views animal charges as national treasures. Dr. Talbot has come in handy when it came to the Venomization plots of Cobra Commander and Doctor Mindbender.

Dr. Link Talbot appears in G.I. Joe: Valor vs. Venom, voiced by Joseph May.

=== Drop Zone ===
Drop Zone is the G.I. Joe Team's Sky Patrol weapon specialist. His real name is Samuel C. Delisi, and he was born in Poteau, Oklahoma. Drop Zone was first released as an action figure in 1990, as part of the "Sky Patrol" line. He is also a Special Forces adviser. He is noted for volunteering for every dangerous assignment and deeply enjoying his job.

Drop Zone appears in the DiC G.I. Joe series, voiced by Don Brown.

=== Effects ===
Effects is the G.I. Joe Team's explosives expert, and he was first released as an action figure in 1994, as part of the Star Brigade line. His real name is Aron Beck. Effects was born in Fort Worth, Texas.

His primary military specialty is explosives/munitions ordnance. His secondary military specialty is special effects coordinator. He uses visual distractions to draw attention away from targets he then destroys.

=== Fast Draw ===
Fast Draw is the G.I. Joe Team's mobile missile specialist, and he was first released as an action figure in 1987. His real name is Eliot Brown, and his rank is that of corporal E-4. Fast Draw was born in Collierville, Tennessee.

Fast Draw's primary military specialty is ordnance, and his secondary military specialty is clerk typist. Fast Draw carries the FAFNIR (Fire and Forget Non-tube-launched Infantry Rocket) missile system, and wears a protective suit to shield him from hot exhaust gases. The FAFNIR target acquisition and homing devices are self-contained within the missile, which allows the operator to move and take cover immediately after launch. These missiles are extremely fast, and resistant to ECM jamming.

In the Marvel Comics G.I. Joe series, he first appeared in issue #60. Along with Chuckles, Falcon, and Law and Order, he is part of a faux G.I. Joe team being used by others for political gain. After the "new" Joes assist Hawk in battling several Dreadnoks, they are made official members of the team. The conflict had been over a rogue US military faction trying to use a high-tech missile to destroy Cobra Island. He is spotlighted in a latter incident, destroying Cobra tanks threatening his fellow soldiers.

=== Firewall ===
Firewall is the code name of Michelle LaChance. She was born in Virginia Beach, Virginia, and learned early on that she had a knack for computers. In high school, she figured out how to access protected school records and alter grades. This eventually led to hacking government systems and classified military computers, which landed her in federal prison. But her handiwork impressed enough people, that she was sent to the G.I. Joe Team under supervision of Mainframe. There, she received basic military training, and has since been a loyal member, though she is not a field operative. Firewall was instrumental in developing a counter-program, to thwart the top-secret nano-mite technology that was stolen from the U.S. Army by Cobra.

=== Footloose ===
Footloose is the G.I. Joe Team's infantry trooper, and debuted in 1985. His real name is Andrew D. Meyers, and his rank is that of corporal E-4. Footloose was born in Gary, Indiana.

His primary military specialty is infantry, and his secondary military specialty is special services (basketball coach). He was his high school valedictorian, and the captain of the track team, and also earned the rank of Eagle Scout. While working on his degree in Physical Education with a state scholarship, he dropped out of school and went to stay on the coast for three years questioning his existence, when he decided to join the Army. After completing basic training and AIT at Fort Benning, he graduated jump school and the desert training unit. In the UK Action Force toy series, Footloose's real name is Andrew D. Mackay, and he is from Dundee, Scotland, where he competed in the Highland Games and studied Celtic mythology.

Footloose was first released as an action figure in 1985. Proposed code-names for the figure included "Action", "Bravo" and "Grunt". The figure was repainted and released as part of the "Slaughter's Marauders" line in 1989.

The character was voiced by Will Ryan in the 1985 Sunbow animated series.

=== Freefall ===
Freefall is the G.I. Joe Team's paratrooper, and he was first released as an action figure in 1990. He had a 2009 re-release as "Spc. Altitude", but is the same character. This latter release was part of the "Assault On Cobra Island" box set, which included the figures Chuckles, Hit and Run, Outback, Recondo, Wet-Suit and Zap. Freefall's real name is Phillip W. Arndt, and he was born in Downers Grove, Illinois.

To prepare for the Airborne Ranger school, he went through the Ranger Indoctrination Course designed to remove forty percent of the applicants. Freefall then had to conquer a three-week pre-training course, simply to qualify for the full eight-week training course. He is noted for having enjoyed it and come out the best of the Rangers. Freefall has a master's degree in Eastern Philosophy. He is known for having a large ego.

Freefall appears in the DiC G.I. Joe animated series voiced by Scott McNeil.

=== Fridge ===
The Fridge is the code name used by football player William Perry. He was born in Aiken, South Carolina. During his time as a member of the NFL's Chicago Bears football team, Perry worked with G.I. Joe as a physical training instructor. Though he was one of many Joes listed on the World War III member assignment map in G.I. Joe: America's Elite#28, The Fridge was unavailable during the conflict known as World War III.

=== Frostbite ===
Frostbite is the G.I. Joe Team's Snow Cat driver and debuted in 1985. His real name is Farley S. Seward (a pun on "Seward's Folly") and was born in Galena, Alaska. His rank is that of corporal E-4. He is the driver of the G.I. Joe "Snow Cat" halftrack vehicle.

His primary military specialty is motor vehicle driver, and his secondary military specialty is armor. He held a job as a lineman on the Alaska pipeline, but before long he found no challenge in the job, despite the below freezing temperatures and hazardous conditions. He joined the Army when they promised to challenge him as much as he wanted. Frostbite graduated from both the transportation school at Fort Eustis and the armored school at Fort Knox.

Frostbite was first released as an action figure in 1985 packaged with the Snow Cat. The figure was repainted and released as part of the "Tiger Force" line in 1988, packaged with the "Tiger Cat" covert assault half-track.

In the Marvel Comics series, Frostbite first appears in issue #64, and is featured in G.I. Joe Special Missions #20, during a mission to Alaska's Bering Strait. He is sent in with Avalanche and Snow Job to investigate Cobra and Russian movement in the area. He was voiced by Chris Latta in the Sunbow animated series, and Louis Chirillo in the 2004 direct-to-video CGI animated film G.I. Joe: Valor vs. Venom.

=== G.I. Jane ===
G.I. Jane (real name Jane Anne Martelle) is a combat nurse and physicist who was recruited by Joseph Colton.

=== Gears ===
Gears is the G.I. Joe Team's invention technician. His real name is Joseph A. Morrone. His primary military specialty is chief engineer (special projects). His secondary military specialty is research and development. His birthplace is Westerly, Rhode Island.

=== General Flagg ===
General Flagg is the code name as well as the rank and surname of two characters from the toyline, cartoon and comic series.

==== Original General Flagg ====
The original Brigadier General Lawrence J. Flagg is a character who was created specifically for the comics to serve as the G.I. Joe commanding officer during the early issues of the Marvel comics run before he was eventually killed off.

==== James Longstreet Flagg III ====
Brigadier General James L. Flagg III, his son, was a character later introduced for the toyline to serve a similar role. The original General Flagg did not receive his own action figure until 2004, when his figure was included in a "Comic Pack" release. Packaged with him was G.I. Joe member Steeler, and a generic Cobra officer.

==== Lawrence J. Flagg ====
Lawrence J. Flagg was a Brigadier General in the Army. Hailing from a long family line of soldiers, General Flagg served the better part of his life in the Armed Forces. In the 1970s, he was responsible for creating Special Counter-Terrorist Group Delta, in response to rising terrorist threats, especially Cobra. Flagg dubbed the team G.I. Joe, in honor of the team that had been headed by Lt. Joseph Colton some years before. General Flagg led the team in more of an advisory capacity, choosing Colonel Clayton "Hawk" Abernathy as field leader, and allowing Hawk to make most of the membership and operations decisions. In the 2003 alternate Devil's Due continuity, General Flagg starts the G.I. Joe Team in response to an alien robot attack on a Presidential press conference. General Flagg appears in the Sunbow/Marvel animated series, voiced by John Stephenson.

The junior General Flagg was released as part of the "A Real American Hero" toyline in 1992. He made one appearance in the Devil's Due G.I. Joe: America's Elite comic series, in the World War III event. He is shown in the full G.I. Joe character roster on the cover of issue #25, along with his father.

=== General Philip Rey ===
General Philip Rey was introduced in the Devil's Due G.I. Joe series. His real name is Philip A. Rey, and he emerged from seemingly nowhere, to become the field commander of the G.I. Joe Team. It was later revealed that Rey is one of the dozen original clones that were produced during Cobra's development of Serpentor. Dr. Mindbender altered Rey's growth patterns and features to hide his connection to the Cobra Emperor. Additionally, Crystal Ball helped construct Rey's personality, and Zandar helped insert him as a U.S. military general, to make him Cobra's most insidious sleeper agent. Unexpectedly, Rey's years of service and his time with G.I. Joe helped him shake off Cobra's control, and he refused to betray his countrymen, despite deeply implanted hypnotic triggers. Rey's past remains classified, known only to a handful of Joes.

=== Ghostrider ===
Ghostrider is the G.I. Joe Team's stealth fighter pilot, and he was first released as an action figure in 1988, packaged with the Phantom X-19 Stealth Fighter. His real name is Jonas S. Jeffries, and his rank is that of Major, USAF O-4. Ghostrider was born in Chicago, Illinois.

Ghostrider's primary military specialty is stealth fighter pilot, and his secondary military specialty is aeronautical engineer. Ghostrider has been working on not being noticed since the second grade; teachers never noticed him because he conscientiously worked on not being noticed.

In the Marvel Comics G.I. Joe series, he first appeared in issue #76. There he is one of the many Joes to participate in the first Cobra civil war on Cobra Island. He is featured in issue #16 of G.I. Joe Special Missions. He later spends a week with Scarlett, helping to establish a Stealth Fighter base in South America. It is destroyed in a raid orchestrated by Cobra Commander and Darklon. Ghostrider manages to lift off, and assists in saving the aircraft carrier the USS Flagg and the space shuttle the USS Defiant. Also in the battle on the side of the Joes, is the pilot Dogfight in his own craft.

Later, Ghostrider and Slip-Stream, working off the USS Flagg, run a recon mission over the fictional country of Benzheen. Rampart and Backblast save the duo, by shooting down a Cobra Rattler. As with his other appearances, Ghostrider accepts that nobody can remember his code-name. While the mission succeeds, the Stealth Fighter is a complete loss. For most of the issue, Slip-Stream is referred to as "Dogfight", who survived an earlier wreck onto the Flagg in the same issue.

A running gag throughout the Marvel G.I. Joe comic series was that Ghostrider's name was never actually said by any other Joes, or even used in narration. In reality, this was done to avoid any potential issues or problems with Marvel's own Ghost Rider, despite the G.I. Joe character's named being spelled differently as one word.

=== Glenda ===
Glenda is the G.I. Joe Team's helicopter co-pilot and debuted in 1984. Her real name is Jane Mullighan, and her rank is that of sergeant first class (E-7). Her primary military specialty is test pilot, and her secondary military specialty is intelligence. Her hometown is either unknown or CLASSIFIED.

As a six-year-old girl, she flew one of her hometown's helicopters under her father's supervision. She is an Air Intelligence Officer and helicopter co-pilot for high risk missions. Glenda is the first woman to be designated Master Instructor of the Comandos Heróicos (G.I. Joe's international counterparts/partners in South America).

The first Glenda action figure was exclusive to Argentina by the now-defunct toy company Plastirama. The figure reused the same mold from a Scarlett action figure. As an homage to Argentina, the figure's hair was changed to blonde, and the suit's colors were blue and white. In 2023, Glenda received further recognition when she was revealed to be a Tier 2 campaign goal for Hasbro's exclusive Assault Copter Dragonfly (XH–1).

=== Grand Slam ===
Grand Slam is the G.I. Joe Team's original laser artillery soldier and debuted in 1982. His real name is James J. Barney, and his rank is that of sergeant E-5. Grand Slam was born in Chippewa Falls, Wisconsin. His primary military specialty is artillery and his secondary military specialty is an electronics engineer. His initial training was in conventional artillery and then after that he served with a 155mm battery. He graduated at the top of his class from Special Weapons School and also graduated from Artillery School as well as Advanced Tech School.

Grand Slam debuted in 1982 and was packaged with the "H.A.L." (Heavy Artillery Laser). The figure was recolored the following year with silver protective gear and recast as a laser jet pack soldier with the J.U.M.P.

In the Marvel Comics G.I. Joe series, he appears in the first issue #1 (June 1982), joining the rest of the original Joe team in attacking a Cobra stronghold to retrieve Dr. Adele Burkhart, a famous pacifist and scientist with national secrets. The mission is successful, though Cobra Commander escapes.

=== Greenshirts ===
The Greenshirts are the generic-looking soldiers from the G.I. Joe toy line and animated series.

The Greenshirts are the equivalent of "extras" in that they are in the story to serve merely as background characters and have little to no speaking parts, effectively making them the Joes' equivalent of the different Cobra foot soldiers. Due to the unique look of each G.I. Joe member, it became a problem for Sunbow animators to render the G.I. Joe Team, especially for all-out battle scenes. The solution was to create generic G.I. Joe soldiers. This also addressed a problem not brought up in the comics....Cobra would outnumber the Joes.

In series 21 of the toyline, six Greenshirts were packaged together under the "Infantry Division" name where they consist of a communication specialist, a counter-intelligence specialist, a heavy weapons specialist, 2 infantry specialists, 2 marksman specialists, and a vehicle specialist.

=== Hardball ===
Hardball is the G.I. Joe Team's multi-shot grenadier. His real name is Wilmer S. Duggleby, and his rank is that of corporal E-4. Hardball was born in Cooperstown, New York, and was first released as an action figure in 1988.

Hardball's primary military specialty is infantry, and his secondary military specialty is special services. Hardball played centerfield in the minor leagues for five seasons before he realized that the big league scouts were looking for star quality over athletic prowess. The G.I. Joe Team was looking for team players however, and had a need for someone who could judge distances accurately and react quickly with deliberation.

In the Marvel Comics G.I. Joe series, he first appeared in issue #80 (November 1988). Hardball is later selected as one of the many Joes to help protect the President of the United States. His skills are vital to rescuing the President after he is kidnapped by Cobra forces. He later mans a machine-gun turret in the Joe vehicle called "The Mean Dog" that had been headed out to a weapons testing range. Hardball, Repeater and Wildcard assist in a running battle against Dreadnoks, who are trying to capture two other Joes, Clutch and Rock 'n Roll.

In the Devil's Due series, the Red Shadows, a Cobra splinter group, wages a campaign against the Joes. While on assignment in South America, Hardball (along with Rampart and Glenda) is killed by the Red Shadows.

=== Hard Drive ===
Hard Drive is the G.I. Joe Team's battlefield computer specialist. His real name is Martin A. Pidel, and he was first released as an action figure in 2004.

=== Hardtop ===
Hardtop is the designer and driver of the G.I. Joe Team's Crawler. His real name is Nicholas D. Klas, and his rank is that of sergeant E-5. Hardtop was born in Chicago, Illinois, and was first released as an action figure in 1987, packaged with the Defiant space vehicle launch complex. In 2004, he was released as part of the "40 Years of Adventure" Tiger Force Box Set, at the 2004 G.I. Joe Convention in Orlando, Florida.

Hardtop's primary military specialty is heavy equipment operator, and his secondary military specialty is electronics. He is a man known for getting the job done without questions; for example, moving the Crawler to the top of a mountain. He is known for being quiet, as talking is not one of his priorities.

Budget cuts later force the closing of the G.I. Joe space shuttle program. Hardtop continues to work with the team as a heavy equipment operator, and also becomes their liaison to the National Space Agency. Due to later developments with fuel cells, he is one of Cobra Commander's most wanted prisoners.

In the Marvel Comics G.I. Joe series, he first appeared, with Payload in issue #64 (October 1987). In that issue, he almost crushes Crankcase's A.W.E. Striker vehicle and Back-Stop's Persuader tank.

=== Heavy Duty ===
Heavy Duty is the G.I. Joe Team's heavy ordnance specialist. Born Lamont A. Morris in Chicago, Illinois, Heavy Duty's rank is unspecified. The character was created by Walter A. McDaniel. Heavy Duty is the cousin of Roadblock who enlisted in the Army; his extreme strength and grasp of advanced weapon systems brought him to the attention of the G.I. Joe Team. When G.I. Joe disbanded in 1994, Heavy Duty returned to his hometown of Chicago, and opened a home-based recording studio. where he recorded his renditions of popular classical pieces on guitar. He returned to G.I. Joe when it was reinstated in 2001.

Heavy Duty made his debut as an action figure in 1991. A new figure was released in 1993 as part of the Star Brigade line.

He made his comic debut in issue #130 (November 1992) of the Marvel Comics series, in which he is among a group of Joes who defend the Pit from an assault by Cobra Command. In the second issue of the IDW/Devil's Due series GI Joe Origins (March 2009), Heavy Duty is part of a running battle in Chicago against an out of control Battle Android Trooper and a group of Dreadnoks and Cobra soldiers.

Heavy Duty appears in G.I. Joe (1989), voiced by William Taylor.

Heavy Duty appears in G.I. Joe: Sigma 6, voiced by F.B. Owens.

Heavy Duty appears in the G.I. Joe: Renegades episode "Cousins", voiced by Keith Ferguson. This version is Hershel Dalton, a corporal who moved out of Biloxi, Mississippi to make a name for himself, having grown ashamed of his deep Southern heritage and believing to be a handicap towards obtaining an advanced education. In addition, his grandfather Jefferson Hinton was a pilot in the Tuskegee Airmen.

In the direct-to-video CGI animated films G.I. Joe: Spy Troops and G.I. Joe: Valor vs. Venom, he is voiced by Blu Mankuma.

Adewale Akinnuoye-Agbaje plays Heavy Duty in the live-action film G.I. Joe: The Rise of Cobra (2009). This version is Hershel Dalton, a former member of the British Armed Forces. Marlon Wayans tried out for the part before being cast as Ripcord.

Heavy Duty appears as a playable character in the video game G.I. Joe: The Rise of Cobra, voiced by Rodney Saulsberry.

=== Heavy Metal ===
Heavy Metal is the G.I. Joe Team's Mauler M.B.T. Tank driver. His action figure debuted in 1985 alongside the Mauler M.B.T. tank. His actual name is Sherman R. Guderian (which is a combination of the Sherman Tank and German general Heinz Guderian). Heavy Metal was born in Brooklyn, New York.

=== Hi-Tech ===
Hi-Tech is the G.I. Joe Team's operations support specialist. His real name is David P. Lewinski, and he was born in St. Paul, Minnesota. Hi-Tech was first released as an action figure in 2004, in a two-pack with Dr. Mindbender. A version of Hi-Tech with no accessories also came with the Built to Rule Patriot Grizzly in 2004. The figure featured additional articulation with a mid-thigh cut joint, and the forearms and the calves of the figure sported places where blocks could be attached.

His primary military specialty is armament research and design. His secondary military specialty is telecommunications. Hi-Tech is a technological genius, and is more at home with a soldering gun than an automatic pistol. He can be counted on to repair any computer-controlled device, rewrite computer code on the fly, and enact emergency field repairs, to get the most out of the G.I. Joe Team's cutting-edge arsenal of equipment.

Hi-Tech appears in the direct-to-video CGI animated movies G.I. Joe: Spy Troops and G.I. Joe: Valor vs. Venom, voiced by Mark Hildreth.

Hi-Tech appears in the animated series for G.I. Joe: Sigma 6, voiced by Eric Stuart.

=== Hit & Run ===
Hit & Run (sometimes spelled as Hit and Run) is the G.I. Joe Team's light infantryman. His real name is Brent Scott, and his rank is that of corporal E-4. Hit & Run was born in Sioux City, Iowa, and was first released as an action figure in 1988. In 1991, Hit & Run was released in Europe in Tiger Force colors, and he received a 25th anniversary style figure as part of the "Assault on Cobra Island" 7-pack. In the UK Action Force series, Hit and Run's real name is Bryan Scott and he is from Basildon in Essex, England.

Hit & Run's primary military specialty is infantry, and his secondary military specialty is mountaineering. He was orphaned at age three by a drunken driver and grew up in a county institution. He escaped from the institution regularly, climbing down sheer walls and running for miles across the plains in the middle of the night. He claimed that he was not running away from anything and merely "practicing." He joined the Army immediately after leaving custody of the county.

In the Marvel Comics G.I. Joe series, he first appeared in issue No. 80. He assists other Joes in stopping Cobra forces on Cobra Island from claiming a nearby land mass. He later takes part in an attempt to rescue hostages, which turns out to be a Cobra ruse: the terrorists and hostages were all Cobra agents. Later, he deals with a legitimate hostage situation, where an isolated farmhouse is taken over by two criminals, but problems arise when the criminals are initially misidentified. He also joins with Tunnel Rat, Stalker and the rookie Scoop soon after to battle Iron Grenadiers in the fictional country of Sierra Gordo.

In the Devil's Due series, he is one of the Joes assigned to invade Cobra Island during their second civil war.

=== Hollow Point ===
Hollow Point is a U.S. Marine sniper and the Range Officer of the G.I. Joe Team. His real name is Max V. Corey, and he was born in Quitman, Arkansas. He was first released as an action figure in 2003 with the Built to Rule Locust, which followed the G.I. Joe: Spy Troops story line. The forearms and the calves of the figure sported places where blocks could be attached.

=== Hot Seat ===
Hot Seat is the G.I. Joe Team's Raider driver. His real name is Michael A. Provost, and his rank is that of Sergeant First Class E-7. Hot Seat was born in Pawtucket, Rhode Island, and was first released as an action figure in 1989, packaged with the "Raider" 4-track assault vehicle.

Hot Seat's primary military specialty is Raider driver, and his secondary military specialty is drill instructor. He was a boxer and could have been a heavyweight contender; he had a left jab like a jack hammer, reflexes like liquid crystal, and the tactical mind of a 5-star general. When he considered the possibilities of permanent brain damage, he instead opted for the Army and asked for "Anything fast and furious!"

In the Marvel Comics G.I. Joe series, he first appeared in issue No. 105. He works with other Joes, the Oktober Guard and the Indian soldiers Tucaros, long time Joe allies, in battle against Destro's Iron Grenadiers.

=== Ice Cream Soldier ===
Ice Cream Soldier is the G.I. Joe Team's flamethrower commando. His real name is Tom-Henry Ragan, and his rank is that of sergeant (E-5). Ice Cream Soldier was born in Providence, Rhode Island, and was first released as an action figure in 1994, as part of the "Battle Corps" line. The entire mold was reused in 2002 for the Shock-Viper figure.

His primary military specialty is fire operations expert. His secondary military specialty is barbecue chef. His code name is designed to cause enemy troops to underestimate him. His equipment is capable of delivering streams of flame up to seventy-five feet.

=== Iceberg ===
Iceberg is the G.I. Joe Team's snow trooper. His real name is Clifton L. Nash, and his rank is that of sergeant E-5. Iceberg was born in Brownsville, Texas, and was first released as an action figure in 1986. A new version of Iceberg was released in 1993 as part of the Battle Corps line.

His primary military specialty is infantry, and his secondary military specialty is cold weather survival instructor. Iceberg hates hot weather; when he signed up for the Army, he asked for duty in Alaska. He is a qualified expert in the M-16A2, M-79, M-60, and M-1911A1.

In the Marvel Comics G.I. Joe series, he first appeared in issue #68, in which he is part of a team sent in to provide security for Battleforce 2000 in Frusenland.

In the Sunbow G.I. Joe series, Iceberg (voiced by Arthur Burghardt) is a supporting character in the 1986 second season. He is featured in the episode "Iceberg Goes South" in which he is captured by Doctor Mindbender and mutated into a killer whale, but is restored to being human.

=== Keel-Haul ===
Keel-Haul is the G.I. Joe Team's Admiral, and was first released as an action figure in 1985, as commander of the USS Flagg aircraft carrier. The figure was repainted and released as part of the "Battle Corps" line in 1993. His real name is Everett P. Colby, and he was born in Charlottesville, Virginia. Keel Haul's rank is that of O-9 (Vice Admiral, USN). He is the highest ranking G.I. Joe officer outside of General Joseph Colton (O-10), outranks General Hawk by two pay grades and serves as head of the Joe team when they operate out of the Flagg.

Keel-Haul's primary military specialty is command, and his secondary military specialty is piloting. He graduated from Annapolis and Navy Flight School, and flew F-4 Phantoms off the Intrepid in the late 1960s. He attended the Naval War College in Newport, RI and the Armed Forces Staff College, and is a holder of the Navy Cross, Distinguished Flying Cross, and Air Medal. He is a respected military historian, a nationally rated chess player, and a clarinet player of questionable talent.

In the Marvel Comics G.I. Joe series, he first appeared in issue #36 (June 1985), a cameo appearance as rescue for seemingly stranded Joes. Keel-Haul and the USS Flagg serve as support in the first assault on Cobra Island. Later, Keel-Haul suggests using a captured Cobra "MAMBA" helicopter to insert a recon team onto Cobra island during the Cobra civil war. Keel-Haul also takes part in the conflict referred to as the "Battle of Benzheen".

In the Devil's Due series, he serves as naval support in the second Cobra Island civil war. Later, he assists a Joe team in neutralizing a Cobra submarine armed with a nuclear device. Keel-Haul saves Wet-Suit from death after the sub-infiltration goes badly.

Keel-Haul will be appearing in G.I. Joe: Ever Vigilant.

=== Knockdown ===
Knockdown (real name Blaine M. Gonsalves) is an infantry member and microwave technician.

He is KIA in G.I. Joe: A Real American Hero #113 while maneuvering through an oil field, when it is bombed by Cobra Commander.

=== Lift-Ticket ===
Lift-Ticket is the G.I. Joe Team's rotary wing aircraft pilot, and his secondary military specialty is fixed-wing aircraft pilot. His real name is Victor W. Sikorski, and his rank is that of chief warrant officer CW-2. Lift-Ticket was born in Lawton, Oklahoma. He joined the army to get out of his hometown, scoring high enough on the aptitude test to qualify for West Point Prep., O.C.S., and Flight Warrant Officer School. He opted for the latter, thinking that it was the only one which offered training applicable to civilian employment. Lift-Ticket was first released as an action figure in 1986, packaged exclusively with the Tomahawk.

In the Marvel Comics G.I. Joe series, he first appeared in G.I. Joe: A Real American Hero No. 49 (July 1986). He is seen transporting several Joes to the American town of Springfield, which was a Cobra stronghold. In the Sunbow animated series, he was often partnered with Lifeline.

Lift-Ticket appears in G.I. Joe: A Real American Hero, voiced by Michael Bell

He had brief appearances in G.I. Joe: The Movie, voiced again by Michael Bell.

Lift-Ticket appears in the G.I. Joe: Renegades episode "Prodigal", voiced by Charlie Schlatter.

=== Lightfoot ===
Lightfoot is the G.I. Joe Team's explosives expert. His real name is Cory R. Owens, and his rank is that of corporal E-4. Lightfoot was born in Wichita, Kansas, and was first released as an action figure in 1988. The figure was repainted and released as part of the Night Force line in 1989, packaged with Shockwave. His primary military specialty is demolitions, and his secondary military specialty is artillery coordinator.

In the Marvel Comics G.I. Joe series, he first appears in Special Missions #13. He is sent to the Trucial Absysmia desert with the Joes Outback, Dusty, and fellow trainee Mangler. They are captured by local military forces, who torture the Joes' objective out of Lightfoot; they were sent to Africa to destroy a buried weapons cache. Only Mangler is angry that Lightfoot broke. After escaping, the Joes manage to make their way to the cache. Lightfoot, despite his injuries, succeeds in destroying it. Mangler sacrifices himself to allow the others to escape.

=== Long Arm ===
Long Arm is the G.I. Joe Team's first strike specialist. His real name is Thomas P. Mangiaratti. His primary military specialty is initial assault. His secondary military specialty is offensive technician. His birthplace is Boulder Creek, California.

=== Long Range ===
Long Range is the code name of two fictional characters in the series.

==== Karl W. Fritz ====
The first is Karl W. Fritz, who is the G.I. Joe Team's Thunderclap driver and debuted in 1989. His rank is E-7 (Sergeant First Class). He was first released as an action figure in 1989, packaged with the "Thunderclap" long-range targeting cannon. Long Range debuted in issue #92 of the Marvel comic series, where he uses his vehicle to help rescue fellow Joes and members of the Oktober Guard.

==== Alejandro Garcia ====
The code name was reused in 2005 for a character named Alejandro Garcia. This version of Long Range is the Joes' transportation expert who drives a Rolling Operations Command Center (R.O.C.C.). He appearsin the Devil's Due G.I. Joe: Sigma 6 comics.

Long Range appears in the 2005 G.I. Joe: Sigma 6 animated series, voiced by Scottie Ray.

=== Mace ===
Mace is the G.I. Joe Team's undercover operative. His real name is Thomas S. Bowman, and he was first released as an action figure in 1993. Mace was born in Denver, Colorado.

His primary military specialty is undercover surveillance. His secondary military specialty is intelligence. Mace has spent years undercover, working against Cobra and other criminal factions. He feeds information to fellow "Battle Corps" members, who then make the resulting raids and arrests.

=== Major Altitude ===
Major Altitude is the G.I. Joe Team's Battle Copter pilot. His real name is Robert D. Owens, and he was born in Rumford, Rhode Island. Major Altitude was first released as an action figure in 1991, as part of the Battle Copters line. He came exclusively with the "Battle Copter" vehicle. He was released again in 1993, as part of a mail-in special called "Terrifying Lasers of Destruction". He was packaged with a Cobra agent, another helicopter pilot, called Interrogator.

At the age of eleven he decides he will eventually join the G.I. Joe team; he decides to focus on its Flight School branch. Eight years later, he finishes Aviator School and Flight Warrant Officer School. He is recruited right into the Joe team. The "Major" does not reflect his rank, it is part of his code-name. He is noted as one of the most skilled pilots in the world.

Major Altitude appears in the DiC G.I. Joe animated series.

=== Major Barrage ===
Major Barrage is the G.I. Joe Team's artillery commander. His real name is David Vennemeyer and he was first released as an action figure in 2005. He is able to take down a squadron in battle and keep fighting.

=== Major Storm ===
Major Storm is the G.I. Joe Team's "General" commander. His real name is Robert G. Swanson, and he was born in Providence, Rhode Island. Major Storm was first released as an action figure in 1990, packaged with the General mobile assault fort. His figure was re-released in 2003. This edition was a G.I. Joe Convention exclusive.

His primary military specialty is command of the General, a large armored vehicle with multiple types of offensive weaponry. His secondary military specialty is long range artillery officer. He has extensive experience with most armored vehicles in many battlefield situations. It is noted that Major Storm is the only one who can decipher some of the General's systems. It is specified he leads a battlefield operation to discover the source of major sabotage against the General.

=== Maverick ===
Maverick (real name Thomas P. Kiley) is a pilot who graduated at the top of his class at the Air Force Academy.

He is KIA in G.I. Joe: A Real American Hero #113 while maneuvering through an oil field, when it is bombed by Cobra Commander.

=== Med Alert ===
Med Alert (real name Kirk Bacus) was an emergency room doctor who enlisted in the military and later learned Tai Chi.

=== Mirage ===
Mirage is the G.I. Joe Team's Bio-Artillery expert. His real name is Joseph R. Baikun, and his rank is that of U.S. Marine Staff Sergeant. Mirage was born in Molson, Washington, and was first released as an action figure in 1993, as part of the "Mega Marines" subset. The Mega Marines are a subgroup dedicated to fighting the "Mega Monsters". His figure came with "moldable bio-armor", a clay like substance.

Mirage then had two releases in 2002, one in 2003 and another in 2005. The last release came with the remote-controlled toy called the "Hoverstrike". Mirage is an expert in various weapons, and trains other soldiers in their use. He was trained by Roadblock.

Mirage appeared in the Devil's Due series. He assists the Joe team in fighting the second Cobra civil war, which like the first one, is against Serpentor's forces on Cobra Island. He also appears in issues #34–36.

=== Muskrat ===
Muskrat is the G.I. Joe Team's swamp fighter. His real name is Ross A. Williams, and his rank is that of corporal E-4. Muskrat was born in Thibodaux, Louisiana, and was first released as an action figure in 1988.

The 1988 Target stores exclusive release of Muskrat, is a double-pack with Voltar. The packaging text specifies the two characters have a particular hatred of each other. The figure was repainted and released as part of the Night Force line in 1989, packaged with Spearhead. A new version of Muskrat was released in 1993 as part of the Battle Corps line.

Muskrat's primary military specialty is infantry, and his secondary military specialty is social services. He spent his youth in the swamp, hunting raccoon, possum, and wild pig, holding his own against poachers, 'gator skinners, moonshiners, chain gang escapees, and smugglers. Ranger School and Jungle Warfare Training Center seemed easy to him after that.

In the Marvel Comics G.I. Joe series, he first appeared in issue No. 80. Muskrat is also part of a rescue squad sent into a hot-spot in Southeast Asia to rescue fellow Joes. He is one of many sent in on a Tomahawk helicopter. He has to assist in dealing with Russian gunships, highly explosive extra fuel and the wounding of several crew members (himself included).

=== Nunchuk ===
Nunchuk is the codename of Ralph Baducci. His code-name is a variation on the word nunchaku, the character's preferred weapon. He was born in Brooklyn, New York, and studied with a blind sensei in Denver. Nunchuk felt the need for improvement, and moved to San Francisco. He caught the attention of Storm Shadow, who trained him and supervised his acceptance into G.I. Joe's Ninja Force. Nunchuk later moves to training other Joe soldiers in various forms of hand-to-hand combat. He also develops a grudge against the Cobra operative Firefly, because he is angry that the man would use martial arts for evil purposes.

=== Ozone ===
Ozone is G.I. Joe Team's ozone replenisher trooper. His real name is David Kunitz, and his rank is that of corporal E-4. Ozone was born in Three Mile Island, Pennsylvania, and was first released as an action figure in 1991, as part of the Eco-Warriors line. He had two releases in 1993 and another in 1994. The last three were releases under the Star Brigade subgroup, establishing that the character has traveled into space.

Ozone is a specialist in environmental health and various forms of airborne sludge and other harmful chemicals. He carries equipment designed to neutralize these substances as well as replenish the ozone layer.

In the Marvel Comics G.I. Joe series, he first appeared in issue #123. There and in the next two issues, he teams with Flint and Clean-Sweep as the "Eco-Warriors" sub-team. They confront the Cobra operative Cesspool on a seemingly abandoned oil platform. Ozone stops the confrontation, by bringing in a lawyer.

Ozone appears in the DiC G.I. Joe animated series.

=== Pathfinder ===
Pathfinder is the G.I. Joe Team's jungle assault specialist. His real name is William V. Iannotti, and his rank is that of Staff Sergeant E-6. Pathfinder was born in Key West, Florida, and was first released as an action figure in 1990. He also had a release under the "Action Force" line. He had a 2001 release packaged with the A.W.E. Striker vehicle, and in the same year, he had a release with the V.A.M.P. vehicle.

Pathfinder's father was a Korean War veteran who taught him the finer points of military reconnaissance. He was not considered too young to learn how to rough it out in the wild swamps of Florida, which enabled him to breeze through much of the Army's jungle training. It came to the point where he was teaching everyone including the instructors what jungle survival is all about. Soon thereafter, he received his certification as a jungle assault specialist, and became part of the G.I. Joe Team. Pathfinder is now responsible for leading all covert attacks on Cobra Island.

Pathfinder appears in issue No. 24 of the Devil's Due G.I. Joe series. He is one of many Joes called up to fight against the personal army created by Serpentor.

In the DiC G.I. Joe animated series, Pathfinder was voiced by Garry Chalk, and was friends with Capt. Grid-Iron and Ambush.

=== Payload ===
Payload is the G.I. Joe Team's Defiant pilot. His real name is Mark Morgan Jr., and his rank is that of Colonel, USAF O-6. Payload was born in Cape Canaveral, Florida, and was first released as an action figure in 1987, packaged with the Defiant space vehicle complex. He was re-colored and released again in 1989, packaged with the Crusader space shuttle. A new version of Payload was released in 1993 as part of the Star Brigade line. That version was re-colored and released again in 1994. In Europe, Payload was released as an interplanetary Cobra soldier.

Payload's primary military specialty is astronaut, and his secondary military specialty is fixed wing pilot. He grew up watching the early space flights blasting off, staring at the flaming boosters through the hurricane fence. He joined the Air Force to make his dream a reality, flying F-4 Phantoms over southeast Asia for three tours. He signed up for the astronaut training program after returning to the United States. Payload frequently works closely with Hardtop, a specialist in the launching facility the Defiant moves in.

In the Marvel Comics G.I. Joe series, he first appears in issue #64. He heads up a mission to stop Cobra forces from stealing U.S. spy satellites; the mission fails when Cobra destroys the satellites, after they are prevented from stealing them. Payload then leads a mission to rescue survivors from a G.I. Joe mission to the fictional land of Trucial-Abysmia.

Payload is featured in the last issue of the "Special Missions" series, where he, Ace and Slipstream are sent to space to test out various surveillance techniques. When he learns G.I. Joe forces are in trouble on land, Payload goes against plan and pilots the Defiant back to Earth. He uses the Defiant's weaponry to neutralize the threat and lands on the USS Flagg aircraft carrier.

He later becomes a member of Star Brigade, which also and includes Space Shot, Sci-Fi and Roadblock. The Joes team up with the current Oktober Guard to stop an asteroid endangering Earth; this team. The shuttles for both teams are damaged in the mission, and Payload cannibalizes the Defiant to fix the Russian spacecraft. Both teams safely leave in the latter one. The Defiant is destroyed when the asteroid safely explodes.

Payload and Wild Bill rescue several of their fellow pilots from summary execution in an ill-fated mission to Sierra Gordo.

Payload and the Defiant play a critical role in the climax of the G.I. Joe novel "Fool's Gold". He works with Sci-Fi and Hawk to destroy a Cobra weapon aimed at Earth. He also is featured in the Little Golden Books "Tower Of Power" G.I. Joe story.

=== Quarrel ===
Quarrel is a member of the G.I. Joe team. Her real name is Hedda Pulver, and her rank is OR-6 (sergeant). Quarrel was born in Interlaken, Switzerland, and debuted as an action figure in 1983 in the United Kingdom and Europe. She was packaged with the Action Force Z-Force Rapid Fire Motorcycle.

Quarrel's primary military specialty is undercover operations, and her secondary military specialty is a commando. Quarrel is the daughter of a Swiss diplomat who was too busy to spend any time with her while she was growing up. To gain his admiration, she spent her early years training and excelling in martial arts, and eventually became well known as an all-around sportswoman. Although she was a top ranking competitor in the annual British Grand Prix Motorcycle Championships, she sought even more adventure and joined the S.A.F. (Special Action Force). Their Z Force infantry, armor and artillery unit gave her new challenges as well as unlimited access to high speed vehicles. She graduated at the top of her class in undercover ops school and advanced unarmed combat school. Although normally passive, she has the reflexes to explode into violent action at any moment. Her signature weapons include a modified crossbow, throwing stars (shurikens), and Chinese butterfly knives (dāo).

=== Rampage ===
Rampage is the code name of Walter A. McDaniel. He was first released as an action figure in 1989, as a replacement for Heavy Metal. He was re-released in 2003, as the G.I. Joe Team's "Split Fire" driver.

=== Rampart ===
Rampart is the G.I. Joe Team's shoreline defender. His real name is Dwayne A. Felix, and his rank is that of U.S. Navy Petty Officer (2nd class). Rampart grew up in New York City, New York, and was first released as an action figure in 1990.

Rampart spent his time mastering all video games he had access to, at home and the arcade. He put his hand-eye coordination to use in the Navy. In the air defense artillery, Rampart attained the highest combat success ratio in the 7th Fleet for "splashing" enemy aircraft. He joins the Joes directly from the Navy.

In the Marvel Comics G.I. Joe series, he first appeared in issue #115. He served in the "Battle of Benzheen". He and Backblast maintain a sentry point deep in the Benzheen desert, and destroy a Rattler plane chasing the Joe pilot Ghostrider.

In the Devil's Due series, he was killed by Red Shadow agents while on assignment in South America.

Rampart appears in the DiC G.I. Joe animated series, voiced by Ian James Corlett.

=== Rapid Fire ===
Rapid Fire is the G.I. Joe Team's attack expert. His real name is Robbie London, named after an executive at DIC Animation. Rapid Fire was born in Seattle, Washington, and was first released as an action figure in 1990. He came with a free VHS tape of the G.I. Joe DiC episode "Revenge Of The Pharaohs". He does not appear in that episode.

He specializes in fast-attack maneuvers and sabotage tactics. He is fluent in three languages, has Airborne Ranger training and is the recipient of a Medal of Honor. He attended the United States Military Academy, commonly known as "West Point". He completed their ten-week Cadet Summer Orientation in only five weeks.

=== Recoil ===
Recoil is the G.I. Joe Team's L.R.R.P. (Long Range Recon Patrol, pronounced "Lurp"). His real name is Joseph Felton, and his rank is that of sergeant E-5. Recoil was born in Vashon Island, Washington, and was first released as an action figure in 1989.

Recoil's primary military specialty is infantry, and his secondary military specialty is RTO (Radio Telephone Operator). His job is to gain access to enemy territory, gather intelligence and extricate himself undetected.

In the Marvel Comics G.I. Joe series, he first appeared in issue #111. Recoil is one of many Joes sent to the fictional county of Benzheen, to battle Cobra influence. Recoil's patrol group, consisting of Sneak Peek, Dusty, Stalker and Ambush come under fire by a group of Cobra soldiers. Sneak Peek is killed, and Recoil and Ambush are injured.

In the Devil's Due G.I. Joe series, Recoil is seen as one of the Joes fighting against 'Coil', the army created by Serpentor. This conflict takes place on Cobra Island.

=== Red Dog ===
Red Dog is a member of the G.I. Joe Team as one of Sgt. Slaughter's Renegades. His real name is David Taputapu, and his rank is equivalent to that of sergeant E-5. Red Dog was born in Pago Pago, American Samoa, and debuted as an action figure in 1987 as part of the Sgt. Slaughter's Renegades three-pack, along with Mercer and Taurus.

Red Dog's primary military specialty is infantry. He had a promising career as a barefoot placekicker on an American football team, until a defensive lineman stomped on his big toe. Red Dog gave the lineman a broken helmet and a concussion in return, for which he was suspended for excessive roughness. After a brief career as a stuntman in "B" movies, he was recruited by the G.I. Joe Command for the Sgt. Slaughter's Renegades sub team. This team has no official status, and its movements and activities are virtually unrestricted. However, this means that they get no credit when they succeed, and everyone denies all knowledge of them when they fail.

Red Dog appears in G.I. Joe: The Movie, voiced by Poncie Ponce.

=== Red Spot ===
Red Spot (real name Michael P. Richie) is a Laser Weapon Systems operator who built his first laser device when he was nine.

=== Red Zone ===
Red Zone is the code name of Luke Ellison. He is the Steel Brigade's urban assault trooper, and was first released as an action figure in 2006. The G.I. Joe Team took an interest in him when he was "a little too enthusiastic for the FBI."

=== Repeater ===
Repeater is the G.I. Joe Team's steadi-cam machine gunner. His real name is Jeffrey R. Therien, and his rank is that of Staff Sergeant E-6. Repeater was born in Cumberland, Rhode Island, and was first released as an action figure in 1988. The figure was repainted and released as part of the Night Force line in 1989, packaged with Charbroil.

Repeater's primary military specialty is infantry, and his secondary military specialty is heavy weapons. Repeater had twenty years of top-notch field performance in the Army, although he never did well in the garrison. However, out in the bush he is the one who brings the other grunts back home alive.

In the Marvel Comics G.I. Joe series, he first appeared in issue No. 82 as part of a training class of potential G.I.Joe recruits. Only he, Lightfoot and Budo become official Joe members. They are taken into battle swiftly and defeat an Iron Grenadier plot to steal valuable weapons, mainly by killing every adversary involved. He is shot and wounded while defending a "Strategic Defense Initiative" installation. He recovers and soon after is involved in a fight with Cobra and Dreadnok forces on the Atlantic City Freeway. Several years later, he again appeared to be shot and wounded during the defense of The Pit in a surprise Cobra assault on the Joe base.

=== Robo-J.O.E. ===
Robo-J.O.E. is the G.I. Joe Team's jet-tech operations expert. He is a scientist who was injured by Destro during a raid to steal plans for Bio Armor. To save his life, he was rebuilt as an armored cyborg. His real name is listed as Greg D. Scott which is the same name used for the Lifeline v5 and v6 file cards. Robo-J.O.E. was born in Casper, Wyoming, and was first released as an action figure in 1993, as part of the Star Brigade line.

Robo-J.O.E.'s only comic book appearance was in the large group shot on the cover of G.I. Joe: America's Elite #25.

=== Rollbar ===
Rollbar (real name Robert E. Dubé) started out as a "tuner" in his civilian life where he provided upgrades on different cars. When he joined the G.I. Joe Team as an assault vehicle driver and mechanic, he upgraded their vehicles in order to outrun Cobra.

=== Rook ===
Rook (real named Edwin Lombardi) is an interrogator who was recruited into the Steel Brigade by General Hawk.

=== Rumbler ===
Rumbler is the code name of Earl-Bob Swilley. He was first released as an action figure in 1987, packaged as the driver of the "Crossfire" 4WD vehicle.

=== Salvo ===
Salvo is the G.I. Joe Team's Anti-Armor Trooper. His real name is David K. Hasle, and he was born in Arlington, Virginia. Salvo was first released as an action figure in 1990, and again in 2005. Both versions have the T-shirt slogan 'The Right of Might'.

Salvo's primary military specialty is anti-armor trooper. He also specializes in repairing "TOW/Dragon" missiles. Salvo expresses a deep distrust of advanced electronic weaponry. He prefers to use mass quantities of conventional explosives to overwhelm enemy forces.

In the Marvel Comics G.I. Joe series, he first appeared in issue No. 114. There, he fights as part of a large scale operation against Cobra forces in the fictional country of Benzheen. Steeler, Dusty, Salvo, Rock'N'Roll, and Hot Seat get into vehicular based combat against the missile expert Metal-Head He is later part of the Joe team on-site who defends G.I. Joe headquarters in Utah against a Cobra assault.

Salvo appears in the DiC G.I. Joe animated series, voiced by Brent Chapman.

=== Scanner ===
Scanner is the codename of Scott E. Sturgis. His primary military specialty is information technology. He first appears in the Devil's Due series. Snake Eyes and Scarlett hide out with Scanner in Iceland, before they are tracked down by Overlord. Scanner is killed in the process of defending the Iceland base, but instrumental in destroying the base (with Overlord inside) to save his teammates.

=== Sci-Fi ===
Sci-Fi is a character from the G.I. Joe: A Real American Hero toyline, comic books and animated series. He is the G.I. Joe Team's laser trooper and debuted in 1986. His real name is Seymour P. Fine, and his rank is that of corporal E-4. Sci-Fi was born in Geraldine, Montana. His primary military specialty is infantry, and his secondary military specialty is electronics. Sci-Fi was released as an action figure in 1986, and repackaged by Hasbro in 1994 as part of the Star Brigade line.

In the Marvel Comics G.I. Joe series, he first appears in issue #64 in a brief cameo and appeared fully in #65. He is a supporting character in a five-issue story arc from #145 to #149 as part of the G.I. Joe Star Brigade team.

Sci-Fi is a supporting character in the 1986 second season of the Marvel/Sunbow animated series and the 1989 DiC G.I. Joe series, voiced both times by Jerry Houser.

=== Scoop ===
Scoop is the G.I. Joe Team's combat information specialist. His real name is Leonard Michaels, and his rank is that of corporal E-4. Scoop was born in Chicago, Illinois, and was first released as an action figure in 1989. In the animated series, his character was a Cobra spy; in the other continuities he is simply a journalist/soldier.

His name, occupation and visage were based on real-life NBC News journalist Mike Leonard.

Scoop's primary military specialty is journalist, and his secondary military specialty is microwave transmission specialist. He has an advanced degree in journalism, as well as a master's degree in electrical engineering. Scoop could have worked for a network news team, but instead opted for service on the G.I. Joe Team so he could be on the spot when news was being made.

In the Marvel Comics G.I. Joe series, he first appeared in G.I. Joe Special Missions #23. He is one of a team sent to Sierra Gordo. Conflict arises because Scoop, while a trained soldier, barely meets G.I. Joe standards. It is shown how he interacts badly with his teammates Muskrat, Leatherneck, Hit and Run, Tunnel Rat and Stalker. Scoop defeats an Iron Grenadier in hand-to-hand combat, smashing the man in the head with the treasured video footage. This also saves the life of Tunnel Rat, who had been wounded. Scoop earns the respect of the other Joe soldiers. He later returns to Sierra Gordo to help rescue Joes and the Oktober Guard. Scoop eventually returns to the reformed G.I. Joe team.

Scoop appears in the DiC G.I. Joe animated series, voiced by Michael Benyaer. Scoop was recruited by Sgt. Slaughter for his "Marauders" sub-team. Scoop was suspected of being a Cobra spy. In the episode "Operation: Dragonfire", Scoop confesses that he is in fact a Cobra spy, but he continues to work with the team, spying on Cobra for G.I. Joe.

Scoop appears as a non-playable character in the G.I. Joe arcade game.

=== Sgt. Hacker ===
Sgt. Hacker is the G.I. Joe Team's information retrieval specialist. His real name is Jesse E. Jordan, and he was first released as an action figure in 2003. He is a computer specialist from Fort Leonard Wood.

=== Sideswipe ===
Sideswipe is the code name of Andrew Frankel. He is the G.I. Joe Team's medical specialist, and was released as an action figure in 2002.

=== Sidetrack ===
Sidetrack was originally the code name of Sean C. McLaughlin. He was the G.I. Joe Team's wilderness survival specialist, and was released as an action figure in 2000. Sidetrack was then used as the code name of John Boyce in 2002. He was a ranger for the G.I. Joe Team, and a former professional wrestler. Boyce was killed by a trap laid out by Cobra hunter Shadow Tracker in a mini-comic published by the G. I. Joe Collectors Club.

=== Skidmark ===
Skidmark is the G.I. Joe Team's Desert Fox driver. His real name is Cyril Colombani, and his rank is that of corporal E-4. Skidmark was born in Los Angeles, California, and was first released as an action figure in 1988, packaged with the "Desert Fox" 6WD jeep.

Skidmark's primary military specialty is fast attack vehicle driver, and his secondary military specialty is infantry. As a kid, he was polite, well groomed, and successful in his studies. However, when he received his first driver's lesson, he subsequently shattered all-known records for accumulating speeding violations. He is the G.I. Joe Team's fastest and most reliable recon driver.

In the Marvel Comics G.I. Joe series, he first appeared in issue No. 72. He joins the team at the same time as Wildcard and Windmill. A Cobra agent, the Star Viper, sneaks onto the Joe's Utah base by holding onto the underside of Skidmark's Desert Fox vehicle. Skidmark and the new Joes pursue the Viper in the next issue.

Skidmark returns in the Devil's Due G.I. Joe series in issue No. 24. He is one of the many Joes recalled up to duty for the second Cobra civil war, this one also taking place on Cobra Island. In issue No. 25, Skidmark is killed by a falling helicopter crash while aiding General Hawk in an attempt to arrest Overlord.

Skidmark is featured in the 1989 'Golden' G.I. Joe coloring book.

=== Skydive ===
Skydive is the G.I. Joe Team's Sky Patrol leader. His real name is Lynton N. Felix, and he was born in Pensacola, Florida. Skydive was first released as an action figure in 1990, as part of the "Sky Patrol" line. Before he was recruited by G.I. Joe, he spent ten years as a non-commissioned officer teaching Ranger School at Fort Benning. He also specializes in personnel administration.

Skydive is voiced by Dale Wilson in the DiC G.I. Joe series.

=== Skymate ===
Skymate is the G.I. Joe Team's glider trooper. His real name is Daniel T. Toner, and he was born in Queenstown, Australia. Skymate was first released as an action figure in 1991, as part of the Air Commandos line.

Skymate flies the "Air Commando" glider. He grew up in a remote station near the Haast's Bluff Aboriginal Reserve. He receives exotic weapons training in the 'Special Air Services', which only complemented his already extensive knowledge of the subject. He is considered very quiet. His preferred weapon is a bow and arrow.

In the Marvel Comics G.I. Joe series, he is mentioned by name in issue No. 118, as being part of a mission involving Chuckles and the Air Commandos, but not seen. In the Devil's Due G.I. Joe series, Skymate is one of many Joes sent to Europe to assist in worldwide outbreaks of Cobra terrorist activity.

Skymate appears in the DiC G.I. Joe animated series.

=== Skystriker ===
Skystriker is a member of the special G.I. Joe group Tiger Force, and serves as the jet fighter pilot tasked with operating the "Tiger Rat" assault plane. His real name is Alexander P. Russo, and he was first released as an action figure in 1988. Skystriker was born in Providence, Rhode Island, and grew up around planes on a military base. He is noted for destroying more than fifteen Cobra planes during attacks on Cobra Island.

=== Sneak Peek ===
Sneak Peek is the G.I. Joe Team's advanced recon specialist. His real name is Owen King, and his rank is that of sergeant E-5. Sneak Peek was born in Bangor, Maine, where Stephen King is a longtime resident, and this is an apparent reference to Stephen King's son, Owen King. He was first released as an action figure in 1987. The figure was repainted and released as part of the Night Force line in 1988, packaged with Falcon.

Sneak Peek's primary military specialty is infantry, and his secondary military specialty is radio-telecommunications. Sneak Peek is known for a mission while in a Ranger recon battalion, in which he was never recalled due to an error; he continued observing enemy activity, taking notes and sketching maps for two weeks, until someone remembered he was still out there and signaled for him to return. Sneak Peek is Ranger qualified and proficient with all NATO night vision devices.

In the Marvel Comics G.I. Joe series, he first appeared in issue #73. He is part of a recon team that works its way through Cobra Island during the Cobra civil war. Later, he is shot and killed during the battle of Benzheen. He "dies" saving a little boy being placed in danger by a Frag Viper. The same issue reveals details of his friendship with fellow Joe Dusty. In IDW's continuation of this storyline, it is revealed that Sneak Peek survived these wounds and was sent deep undercover in Darklonia. His survival was a secret even to his own friends and family.

In the Devil's Due G.I. Joe series, another agent takes his code name, and goes undercover with the Dreadnoks. He is severely injured by a Viper while checking out a Joe nuclear bomb shelter.

Sneak Peek is a supporting character in the novel The Sultan's Secret by Peter Lerangis. He also has a role in Invisibility Island.

=== Snow Storm ===
Snow Storm is the G.I. Joe Team's high-tech snow trooper. His real name is Guillermo "Willie" Suarez, and his rank is that of Staff Sergeant E-6. Snow Storm was born in Havana, Cuba, and was first released as an action figure in 1993, as part of the Battle Corps line.

His primary military specialty is arctic warfare. His secondary military specialty is cold weather survival instructor.

=== Space Shot ===
Space Shot is the G.I. Joe Team's combat freighter pilot. His real name is George A. Roberts, and he was born in Everett, Massachusetts. Space Shot was first released as an action figure in 1994, as part of the Star Brigade line.

His file card establishes that he flew cargo between planets in Earth's solar system, and for fun he would fly blindfolded through the rings of Saturn. This earned him the attention of Duke, who recruited him and found it was not easy teaching him military discipline. He has defended four space stations from Cobra attack, and makes Cobra 'Blackstar' pilots look like trainees.

In the Marvel Comics G.I. Joe series, he first appeared in issue #145. His comics continuity does not match the file card, as he is simply one of many Joes with basic, "real-world" astronaut experience. Space Shot is part of Star Brigade and takes part in a mission to deal with an asteroid threatening all of Earth. With the assistance of the latest version of Oktober Guard, the Joes fight androids in the asteroid's interior, and ultimately the robot army is defeated and the teams makes it off the asteroid before it is safely destroyed.

=== Sparks ===
Sparks is the G.I. Joe Team's communication and computer expert. His real name is Alessandro "Alex" D. Verdi, and he was first released as an action figure in 2007. Sparks is the son of a former U.S. ambassador, and was born in Carecare, Italy. He spent his formative years in Europe, becoming fluent in 13 languages, as well as learning the finer points of diplomacy. After graduating from Harvard, he planned to become an interpreter for the military, but instead serves as a liaison to the Pentagon for the G.I. Joe Team. Sparks is an essential cog in G.I. Joe operations, thanklessly filing mountains of paperwork and records, according to the stringent protocols of military bureaucracy. His military specialties include telecommunications, cryptologic operations, and electronic warfare. In the Sunbow G.I. Joe series, he appeared in the 1984 "The Revenge of Cobra" mini-series and later retired from the team, working at a television station, but helped G.I. Joe uncover a Cobra plot in the episode "Grey Hairs and Growing Pains".

=== Spearhead ===
Spearhead is the G.I. Joe Team's point man. His real name is Peter R. Millman, and his rank is that of corporal E-4. Spearhead was born in St. Louis, Missouri, and was first released as an action figure in 1988, with his pet bobcat Max. The figure was repainted and released as part of the Night Force line in 1989, packaged with Muskrat.

Spearhead's primary military specialty is infantry, and his secondary military specialty is finance. He was once the youngest and most successful insurance salesman in the Pacific Northwest; everybody liked him and trusted him, and bought more insurance from him than they could afford. However, he joined the Army, feeling that somebody had to do it. Thanks to Spearhead's charisma, and with his bobcat Max as a source of inspiration, soldiers are willing to follow him when he takes the lead.

In the Marvel Comics G.I. Joe series, he first appeared in G.I. Joe Special Missions #21. He works with Airtight, Charbroil and other Joes in an attempt to stop Dreadnoks activity in the sewers of New York. They fail to stop Cobra's plan to create a telemarketing scam center, and their new ally, a homeless veteran, dies while believing he saved the Joes' lives.

Spearhead returns for active duty when the Joe team is reformed in the Devil's Due series. Spearhead is also one of the many Joes to combat Serpentor in the second Cobra civil war.

=== Specialist Trakker ===
Specialist Trakker is the M.A.S.K. character Matt Trakker. He was released in 2008 as an advanced vehicle specialist for the G.I. Joe Team.

In the G.I. Joe universe according to Specialist Trakker's file card, M.A.S.K.'s enemies in V.E.N.O.M. were a splinter faction of Cobra Command.

=== Starduster ===
Starduster is the G.I. Joe Team's Jet Pack Trooper. His real name is Edward J. Skylar, and he was born in Burlingame, California. Starduster was first released as an action figure in 1987, as a mail-in exclusive from Action Stars cereal, and later as a mail-in offer from Hasbro Direct. In 2008, he was renamed Skyduster and released with the Toys R Us exclusive Air Command Set, which also included Capt. Ace and Wild Bill.

Starduster's primary military specialty is Infantry Transportable Air Recon, and his secondary military specialty is Helicopter Assault. He was a trapeze artist before he enlisted in the Airborne Rangers. Starduster was recruited into the G.I. Joe team by Duke.

In 1985, a television commercial for Action Stars cereal depicted a boy making his way to a bowl of cereal led by the character Duke. After eating the cereal, the boy flies into the air following Starduster. This was the only time that the action-figure Starduster appeared in animated form, as he was never part of the television series.

Starduster was featured in three out-of-continuity mini-comics packaged in Action Stars cereal. Starduster also appears in the comic tie-in to the Commandos Heroicas, which were released in both toy and comic book character form as part of the 2009 G.I. Joe convention. Starduster became commander of this Argentine branch of the G.I. Joe team.

=== Static Line ===
Static Line is the G.I. Joe Team's Sky Patrol demolitions expert. His real name is Wallace J. Badducci, and he was born in Chicago, Illinois. Static Line was first released as an action figure in 1990, as part of the "Sky Patrol" line.

His primary military specialty is demolitions expert. He is also a trained aircraft mechanic. Static Line is noted for his eye for detail and for not destroying explosive devices, but rendering them inert.

Static Line appears in the DiC G.I. Joe animated series, voiced by Alvin Sanders.

=== Steam-Roller ===
Steam-Roller is the G.I. Joe Team's Mobile Command Center operator. His real name is Averill B. Whitcomb, and his rank is that of sergeant E-5. Steam-Roller was born in Duluth, Minnesota, and was first released as an action figure in 1987, packaged with the Mobile Command Center.

Steam-Roller's primary military specialty is heavy equipment operator, and his secondary military specialty is armor. He worked on heavy cranes on the Great Lakes' docks, earth movers in the strip mines of Appalachia, and graders on the blacktop highways of several states. He was operating an M-15A2, 50 ton transporter when he was assigned to the G.I. Joe Team. Steam-Roller is a qualified expert with all NATO small-arms and explosives.

In the Marvel Comics G.I. Joe series, he first appeared in issue #99. He also makes an appearance in the following issue. He battles Python Patrol members in the Utah desert.

=== Stretcher ===
Stretcher is the G.I. Joe Team's Medical Specialist. His real name is Thomas J. Larivee, and he was born in Hartford, Connecticut. Stretcher was first released as an action figure in 1990.

Before the G.I. Joe team, he served as a front-line medic in a NATO military unit. Though Stretcher is a qualified medical specialist, his primary purpose is removing wounded soldiers from the battlefield. As such, he is noted for his strength.

In the Marvel Comics G.I. Joe series, he first appeared in issue No. 105. He is one of a team of Joes sent to Sierra Gordo to rescue fellow soldiers from Iron Grenadiers. Stretcher is one of the many Joes to take part in a confrontation against Cobra forces in Benzheen. Stretcher is one of many staffing an isolated military outpost. He confirms the death of Sneak Peek, who had died saving a child. Stretcher also appears in issue No. 125.

Stretcher returns to the Joe team in the Devil's Due produced comic book series. He is one of the many soldiers to intervene in the second Cobra civil war, which again takes place on Cobra Island.

Stretcher appears in the DiC G.I. Joe animated series, voiced by Alvin Sanders.

=== Sub-Zero ===
Sub-Zero is the G.I. Joe Team's winter operations specialist. His real name is Mark Habershaw, and he was born in Smithfield, Rhode Island. Sub-Zero spent time as an instruction at the Army Northern Warfare Training Center in Fort Greely. He was also a consult to the Cold Regions Test center at the same base. He also trained military forces in Europe for cold weather combat. He is noted for hating cold weather.

Sub-Zero was first released as an action figure in 1990. In 1993 he is part of the mail-order Arctic Commandos subset. This is part of the main-in campaign known as 'Terrifying Lasers Of Destruction'. Sub-Zero is included with Stalker, Dee-Jay and a Cobra Snow-Serpent. The fiction of this sub-set is that Sub-Zero's team must stop a Cobra weapon placed atop Mount Everest.

Sub-Zero first appeared in G.I. Joe: America's Elite #32, providing security at a prison during the World War III event.

Sub-Zero appears in the DiC G.I. Joe animated series, voiced by Don Brown.

=== Super Trooper ===
Super Trooper is the code name of Paul Latimer. He was born in Dayton, Ohio, and was first released as a mail-in figure in 1988. His primary military specialty is infantry, and his secondary military specialty is public relations.

=== Sure Fire ===
Sure Fire (real name David S. Lane) is a Criminal Investigation Division member and telecommunications expert who grew up in the poor side of town. When he was young, he earned a black belt in Shoto-Kan Karate-Do.

=== Switch Gears ===
Switch Gears is a tank driver for the G.I. Joe Team, and was released as an action figure in 2003. His real name is Jerome T. Jivoin, and he was born in Bogotá, Colombia. Switch Gears is said to have a high tolerance for pain, and described as very strong and never giving up. He also likes to show up at fortified Cobra positions disguised as a Cobra courier with fake retreat orders, and prefers his bare hands to weapons.

=== Taurus ===
Taurus is a member of the G.I. Joe Team as one of Sgt. Slaughter's Renegades. His real name is Varujan Ayvazyan, and his rank is equivalent to that of sergeant E-5. Taurus was born in Istanbul, Turkey and was first released as an action figure in 1987, as part of a three-pack with Mercer and Red Dog.

Taurus's primary military specialty is demolitions. He was a circus acrobat in Europe, doing occasional undercover work for INTERPOL. When the G.I. Joe top brass witnessed him breaking two-by-fours on his own face as part of his circus act, they recruited him for the Sgt. Slaughter's Renegades sub team on the spot. Taurus is fluent in a dozen languages, and has been cross-trained in explosives and mountaineering. The Renegades have a freedom of operation unmatched by the other Joes: they are not carried on the existing rosters of any existing military unit, there is no computer access to their dossiers, and they are paid through a special fund earmarked for "Pentagon Pest Control". This team has no official status, and its movements and activities are virtually unrestricted. However, this means that they get no credit when they succeed, and that the government can deny the Renegades' existence if they are caught.

Taurus is seen in issue No. 32 of G.I. Joe: America's Elite (Feb 2007). He is fighting Cobra soldiers in his home city of Istanbul. Assisting him are the Joe soldiers Heavy Duty and Bombstrike.

Taurus appeared in the animated film G.I. Joe: The Movie voiced by Earl Boen. He appears as a member of Sgt. Slaughter's Renegades and operates as an assistant drill sergeant.

=== T'Gin-Zu ===
T'Gin-Zu (also spelled T'gin-Zu) is a ninja who is the G.I. Joe Team's "Pile Driver" operator and member of Ninja Force. His real name is Joseph R. Rainone. His primary military specialty is Pile Driver vehicle operator. His secondary military specialty is ninja swords master. His birthplace is Somers, New York. T'Gin-Zu has studied martial arts for more than two decades. He has learned some of the secrets of the Arashikage ninja clan and has spent time as a student of Storm Shadow who considers him his most talented pupil. T'Gin-Zu has a developed a deep desire to single-handedly capture Cobra's band of "Red Ninja-Vipers".

=== T'Jbang ===
T'Jbang is a ninja and member of Ninja Force the code name of Sam LaQuale. He was born in East Greenwich, Rhode Island. He is a former member of the Arashikage clan founded by Storm Shadow, a ninja who is also his second cousin. He has crafted his own personal sword, designed for his secretive 'Silent Backslash' technique. T'Jbang is also skilled in piloting helicopters.

=== Thunder ===
Thunder is a character from the G.I. Joe: A Real American Hero toyline, comic books and animated series. He is the G.I. Joe team's self-propelled gun artilleryman, and debuted in 1984. His real name is Matthew Harris Breckinridge, and his rank is that of sergeant E-5. He was born in Louisville, Kentucky. Thunder was first released as an action figure packaged with the Slugger artillery vehicle.

He first appeared in G.I. Joe: A Real American Hero #51 (September 1986). He is among several Joes killed in action in issue #109.

Thunder made his debut in the Sunbow/Marvel G.I. Joe animated series in "The Revenge of Cobra".

=== Thunderwing ===
Thunderwing (real name Spencer D. Crecelius) is an Armored Weapons Systems operator and heavy equipment operator who is the frontman for G.I. Joe's armored tank division. He used to work as a nightclub bouncer and construction worker before enlisting in the army.

=== Tiger Claw ===
Tiger Claw is the code name of Chad M. Johnson. He was first released as an action figure in 2005 as the ninja apprentice of Snake Eyes.

Tiger Claw appears in G.I. Joe: Ninja Battles, voiced by Brian Drummond.

=== Tollbooth ===
Tollbooth is the G.I. Joe Team's bridge layer driver. His real name is Chuck X. (for nothing) Goren, and his rank is that of E-5 (Sergeant). Tollbooth was born in Boise, Idaho, and was first released as an action figure in 1984, packaged exclusively with the Bridgelayer (Toss N Cross) as a Sears Exclusive. Tollbooth and the Bridgelayer (Toss N Cross) were later released as part of the fourth series in 1985.

Tollbooth's primary military specialty is combat engineer, and his secondary military specialty is demolitions. As a child, Tollbooth had a love for construction sets, which he made bigger and more complex until he outgrew them all. As an adult he started building in earnest, and got his master's degree in engineering from MIT. When he needed a bigger challenge, he joined the Army to sign up for the G.I. Joe Team.

In the Marvel Comics G.I. Joe series, he first appeared in issue #51 (September 1986). He is manning the "Chaplain's Assistant Motor Pool" machinery, the figurative and literal cover for the Pit, the headquarters of the G.I. Joe team. He later appeared in issues #62, 76, and 77. In issue #76, Tollbooth is part of a Joe infiltration team attacking Cobra Island defenses through the swamps.

Tollbooth appeared in the G.I. Joe animated series voiced by Michael Bell. His first appearance in the first-season episode "Three Cubes to Darkness." His appearance is slightly different from his figure as he is shown with a green hardhat in the series.

=== Topside ===
Topside is the G.I. Joe Team's Navy assault specialist. His real name is John Blanchet, and his rank is that of First Class Petty Officer in the United States Navy. Topside was born in Fort Wayne, Indiana, and was first released as an action figure in 1990.

He grew up on a farm with his father; their pigs won many awards at the county fairs. Topside became known as the Fort Wayne 'Hog Master'. At age twenty, wanting a more exciting career, he joined the navy. Serving as a deckhand, he overheard tales of bragging from a G.I. Joe special ops team on their way to a mission. He challenged the entire team; this led to him being noticed and recruited. A quote on his file card indicates Topside takes physical punishment with ease.

Topside appeared in the Devil's Due G.I. Joe series. In terms of the comics, he had worked with the Joe team a short time before they disbanded in 1994. Topside is part of the team to invade Cobra Island. He is also a featured character in part 1 of the "Fun Publishing" official "G.I. Joe Vs. Cobra" comic book released for the G.I. Joe conventions.

Topside appeared in three episodes of the DiC G.I. Joe animated series: "An Officer and a Viperman" and "Ghost of Alcatraz" Part I and Part II.

=== Tracker ===
Tracker was first released as an action figure in 1991. His real name is Christopher R. Groen, and he was born in Helena, Arkansas. Tracker is a Navy SEAL with a specialty in underwater arms development. In terms of tracking, escaping and evading, Tracker has outperformed the best the Joe team has to offer.

Tracker appears in the DiC G.I. Joe animated series, voiced by Phil Hayes.

=== Updraft ===
Updraft is the G.I. Joe Team's Retaliator pilot. His real name is Matthew W. Smithers, and he was born in Bismarck, North Dakota. Updraft was first released as an action figure in 1990, packaged with the "Retaliator" hi-tech attack copter.

Updraft was the team leader in the "World Helicopter Championships", leading the US team to victory twice. He joins the Flight Warrant Office School at Fort Rucker and became a special instructor. From there, he was selected for G.I. Joe duty. He personally improves much of the "Retaliator" helicopter, a vehicle he later flies into battle.

In the Marvel Comics G.I. Joe series, he first appeared in issue #130. He assists the Joe team in defending their headquarters from a Cobra attack.

He is also part of a mission in the Devil's Due G.I. Joe series, helping the Joe team battle Serpentor and his forces in the second Cobra civil war. As with the first one, this war takes place on Cobra Island.

=== Wet Down ===
Wet Down (real name David R. Alexander) is a cover naval operations expert and martial arts instructor.

=== Whiteout ===
Whiteout is an arctic trooper for the G.I. Joe Team. His real name is Leonard J. Lee III, and he was first released as an action figure in 2000. He is a cold weather strategist for the G.I. Joe team and experienced in polar combat mobility.

=== Wide Scope ===
Wide Scope (real namne Larry M. Kranseler) is an infantry soldier and negotiation specialist. He is shown to be very sensitve about his attack dog Lamont.

=== Wildcard ===
Wildcard is the G.I. Joe Team's Mean Dog vehicle Driver. His real name is Eric U. Scott, and his rank is that of corporal E-4. Wildcard was born in Northampton, Massachusetts, and was first released as an action figure in 1988, packaged with the "Mean Dog" 6WD heavy assault vehicle.

Wildcard's primary military specialty is armored vehicle operator, and his secondary military specialty is chaplain's assistant. Wildcard possesses an unnatural talent for breaking things, from sturdy steel machines to simple tools, delicate toys, immovable objects of cast iron, and 8-piece dinner settings. When driving the Mean Dog, the vehicle becomes an extension of himself – a raging engine of destruction, pulverizing all in its path.

In the Marvel Comics G.I. Joe series, he first appeared in issue #72 (June 1988). He joins the team with Skidmark and Windmill. The trio's actual entry to the current Joe base, with the Mean Dog and the vehicle Desert Fox, is marred by the discovery that a Cobra agent had snuck in with them.

He appears in issue #89, on a trip to the Aberdeen Proving Grounds to test the Mean Dog. Assisted by Repeater and Hardball, he routes Cobra forces chasing other Joes. At the end of the battle, Wildcard personally tugs the fleeing Zanzibar out of his Pogo vehicle.

=== Windchill ===
Windchill is the G.I. Joe Team's Arctic Blast vehicle Driver. His real name is Jim Steel, and his rank is that of Staff Sergeant E-6. Windchill was born in Cedar Rapids, Iowa.

Windchill was first released as an action figure in 1989, packaged with the "Arctic Blast" tundra assault sled. The figure was repainted and released as part of the Battle Corps line in 1994. His 1994 release has him packaged with the "Blockbuster" arctic vehicle; furthermore he is named Jim McDonald in that release.

Windchill's primary military specialty is Arctic Blast driver, and his secondary military specialty is cold weather survival instructor. He was an avid skimobiler and hunter, and figured the biathlon would be the ultimate sport for him. He might have qualified for a spot on the American Olympic team if Blizzard hadn't met him at the National Elimination Tournament and given him the idea of getting paid to drive fast, heavily armed snow vehicles.

=== Windmill ===
Windmill is the G.I. Joe Team's Skystorm X-Wing Chopper pilot. His real name is Edward J. Roth, and his rank is that of Captain, USAF O-3. Windmill was born in Allentown, Pennsylvania, and was first released as an action figure in 1988, packaged with the Skystorm X-Wing Chopper.

Windmill's primary military specialty is stopped-rotor aircraft operator, and his secondary military specialty is attack helicopter pilot. He was a flight instructor at the Army Flight Warrant Officers School at Fort Rucker, later flying experimental helicopter prototypes at that facility for the Army Aviation Department Test Activity.

In the Marvel Comics G.I. Joe series, he first appeared in issue #72 (June 1988). He drives onto the current Joe base in the "Desert Fox", accompanied by Skidmark and Wildcard; the latter driving the "Mean Dog". The occasion is marred by the discovery of a hostile that had snuck in by hanging to the underside of the Fox.

=== Wreckage ===
Wreckage is the G.I. Joe Team's jungle demolitions expert. His real name is Dillon L. Moreno, and his rank is that of sergeant (E–5). Wreckage was born in Los Angeles, California, and was first released as an action figure in 2003, packaged in an exclusive Tiger Force five-pack to Toys "R" Us stores.

Wreckage perfected his craft at the Army Jungle Warfare Training Center, where he served as a member of the OpFor (Opposing Forces) cadre. As such, he learned to use unorthodox methods to eliminate enemy forces, and a ferocious combination of fighting styles in close quarter combat, earning him his code name. He was quickly moved to the G.I. JOE team so his natural destructive skills could be utilized to neutralize enemy saboteurs.

Assigned to the Tiger Force special operations unit, Wreckage quickly adapts to whatever environment he is dropped into. He uses a wide variety of explosives to eliminate impediments to the team and is skilled in charged, fuse, remote, launched or timed munition. It is mastery and use of the Special Operations Forces Demolition Kit (SOFDK) that allows him to tailor demolition charges for maximum effect with minimal carry weight.

== Oktober Guard ==
The following are members of the Oktober Guard:

=== Red Star ===
Red Star (real name Captain Anatoly Fodorovich Krimov) was appointed as the new team's leader and a G.I. Joe team member later on. He has an uncanny resemblance to Colonel Brekhov, but their relationship was never explained.

Red Star was voiced by Brent Chapman in the DiC show and by Liam O'Brien in G.I. Joe Renegades.

=== Big Bear ===
Big Bear (real name Grigor Ivanovich Rostoff) is a Russian anti-armor specialist and paratrooper who does not like the Guard to be called the counterpart of G.I. Joe team.

Big Bear is a non-playable supporting character in the 1992 game G.I. Joe: The Atlantis Factor.

Big Bear also appears in the second season of DiCs G.I. Joe, teaming up with Big Ben.

=== Colonel Brekhov ===
Colonel Ivan Brekhov is the original commander of the Oktober Guard. He is usually shown smoking a cigar.

In the Marvel Comics series, Colonel Brekhov is killed in action in Sierra Gordo.

Colonel Brekov teams up with his counterpart Duke in "The Invaders" episode of the Sunbow animated series, voiced by Gregg Berger.

=== Lt. Gorky ===
Lt. Mikhail P. Gorky is a Russian Naval Infantry. After the collapse of the Soviet Union, he was demoralized by the rampant corruption in the Russian armed forces.

In the Devil's Due G.I. Joe series, Lt. Gorky is assigned to assist the Joes and Cobra in a joint mission to rescue Baroness and Flint. He betrays the groups to the kidnappers and is shot dead by Destro.

In the IDW Publishing continuity, Lt. Gorky is bald and has a handlebar mustache.

=== Volga / Dania ===
Volga (real name Daina L. Janack and originally called Dania in the toyline) is a small arms specialist and helicopter for the Oktober Guard. She is a skilled tactition second to Colonel Brekhov.

=== Dragonsky ===
Dragonsky (real name Andrei Freisov) is a flamethrower soldier and mechanic. First appeared in G.I. Joe Yearbook #2. He is said to be incredibly old.

=== Horrorshow ===
Horrorshow (real name Stepan Drukersky) is an RPG trooper from the Georgian Soviet Socialist Republic.

In the Marvel Comics series, he is killed in action in Sierra Gordo.

In IDW continuity, he is named Peter Danko, has a long brown beard, uses a large machine gun, and wears a bulletproof hazardous waste suit.

The Sunbow animated series has him develop a rivalry with Gung-Ho: Horrorshow refers to Gung-Ho as "ugly" while Gung-Ho calls him a "Dumb Russian Bear". He was voiced by Chris Latta in the Sunbow cartoon.

Note: His codename is sometimes rendered as two words ("Horror Show").

=== Schrage ===
Schrage is an infantry and battle technician for the Oktober Guard.

=== Stormavik ===
Stormavik is a Russian para-trooper.

In the Marvel Comics series, Stormavik is killed in action in Sierra Gordo while attempting to save his friends and allies.

In the IDW Publishing continuity, his name is Shturmovik, and he has blond hair and wears a beret. He appears to be the field leader and second in command.

Stormavik doesn't say much in the Sunbow series, where he is partnered with Barbecue.

=== Sgt. Misha Zubenkov ===
Sgt. Misha Zubenkov is a Russian Spetsnaz trooper.

He was introduced in the Devil's Due comic series.

== Comandos Heroicos ==
Besides Glenda, the following are members of the Comando Heroicos (also spelled Comandos Heróicos):

=== Sgt. Redmack ===
Sgt. Redmack (real name Reginald Cobb) is a counter-intelligence specialist, cavalry scout, and mountain trooper who grew up on an Arapaho reservation. After helping G.I. Joe drive Cobra off of the ancestral Arapaho land, Sgt. Redmack joined up with them and was placed on the Comandos Heroicos team.

Note: Sgt. Redmack is based on Redmack from Plastirama's G.I. Joe line from Argentina.

=== Sgt. Shimik ===
Sgt. Shimik (real name Jerome Ford) is an infantry squad leader and heavy machine gunner. He has the nickname of "Cat Eyes" due to being able to almost see in the dark. Shimik became a member of the Comandos Heroicos where he fought Cobra when they infiltrated Argentina

Note: Sgt. Shimik is based on Shimik from Plastirama's G.I. Joe line from Agentina.

=== Sgt. Topson ===
Sgt. Topson (real named Frank Barbieri) is a radiotelecommunications specialist and engineer who invented his own telecommunications system. He helped out Comandos Heroicos when their communications system was being jammed by Cobra. Afterwards, Sgt. Topson joined the Comandos Heroicos.

Note: Sgt. Topson is based on Topson from Plastirama's G.I. Joe line from Argentina.

== Arashikage ==
The following are members of the Arashikage ninja clan that Snake Eyes and Storm Shadow were briefly members of:

=== Hard Master ===
The Hard Master is the leader of the Arashikage clan who was Snake Eyes and Storm Shadow's master. He was assassinated by Zartan when the latter was trying to kill Snake Eyes.

He is voiced by Charlie Adler in G.I. Joe: Resolute and by Keone Young in G.I. Joe: Renegades.

In the film G.I. Joe: The Rise of Cobra, he is portrayed by Gerald Okamura.

In Snake Eyes, the Hard Master is portrayed by Iko Uwais.

=== Blind Master ===
The Blind Master (real name Sensei Moore) is an honorary member of the clan who was taken in and trained by the Hard Master. He later opened a dojo in Denver, Colorado. Jinx, Billy Kessler, Nunchuk, and an orphan called Tyrone were his protégés. He was murdered by Zartan once he realized that he had been used by Cobra. Afterwards, a penitent Zartan took his place.

In the film G.I. Joe: Retaliation, he is portrayed by RZA.

In Snake Eyes, the Blind Master is portrayed by Peter Mensah.

== See also ==
- List of Cobra (G.I. Joe) characters
- List of G.I. Joe Extreme characters
- List of G.I. Joe: A Real American Hero action figures
