= Outback (G.I. Joe) =

G.I. Joe character

- G.I. Joe character
- Illustration of Outback from G.I. Joe: Order of Battle. Art by Herb Trimpe.
- First appearance: G.I. Joe: A Real American Hero issue #59 (May 1987)

In-universe information
- Affiliation: G.I. Joe
- Specialty: Survivalist
- File name: Selkirk, Stuart R.
- Birth place: Big Piney, Wyoming
- SN: 098-54-9270
- Rank: E-5 (Sergeant)
- Primary MOS: Infantry
- Secondary MOS: Survival Training Instructor
- Subgroups: Night Force

Outback is a fictional character from the G.I. Joe: A Real American Hero toyline and comic book series. He is the G.I. Joe Team's survivalist and debuted in 1987.

== Profile ==
The real name of Outback is Stuart R. Selkirk, born in Big Piney, Wyoming, and he earned the rank sergeant E-5.

His primary military specialty is infantry, while his secondary military specialty is survival training instructor. Outback was working as an instructor at the Survival School as well as the Jungle Warfare Training Center. Outback received extensive experience on missions in Central America and other undisclosed locations. Outback is not intimidated by wilderness, and believes he must become part of the environment rather than its adversary.

His reputation in extreme climates and environments earned him a spot on the G.I. Joe Team, and access to the latest gear and military technology, but Outback prefers to prove his ability to do without it. He views the gadgets and gizmos of today's modern world as distractions, which come at the expense of essential skills like finding food, crafting shelter, and navigating the world without the use of GPS. Outback's ability to improvise solutions with the bare minimum of resources, has saved his life and the lives of his teammates time and again.

=== SURVIVAL ===
The word "Survival" printed on his shirt is an acronym, taken from the U.S. Army Ranger Handbook:

- Size up the situation.
- Undue haste makes waste.
- Remember where you are.
- Vanquish fear and panic.
- Improve your situation.
- Value living.
- Act like the natives.
- Learn basic skills.

== Toys ==
Outback was first released as an action figure in 1987.

The figure was repainted and released as part of the Night Force line in 1988, packaged with Crazylegs.

A new version of Outback was released in 1993 as part of the 'Battle Corps' line. A year later the figure was re-released in different colors.

Outback was due to be released as part of the Direct-To-Consumer line but the wave featuring him was cancelled. Outback and the other figures in the wave were later released by the G.I. Joe Collectors Club.

Outback was released in 25th anniversary form as part of the "Assault on Cobra Island" set.

== Comics ==
=== Marvel Comics ===
In the Marvel Comics G.I. Joe series, he first appeared in G.I. Joe: A Real American Hero #59 (May 1987). He has been testing government issued survival equipment and is picked up by a group of Joes returning from weapons testing. The entire group then has to battle an attack by Cobra Commander and Raptor. In issue #61, he is ordered to leave three of his fellow Joes (Stalker, Quick Kick, and Snow Job) behind in order that someone might know they had been captured. Despite the orders, he has trouble dealing with this. His escape from Borovia is detailed in the sixth issue of the 'Special Missions' spin-off series. Outback returns alone to G.I. Joe's Utah headquarters. Leatherneck and Mutt voice how they dislike he has returned alone. The former persists on this topic, leaning into Outback, who pulls a knife on him. The situation is resolved without further violence. Later, the Joes are rescued by another team. They track down Outback and reassure him he did the right thing. His escape had given them enough hope to make it through the ordeal.

Outback is later a part of reserve force of Joes that arrive to add the Joes already on Cobra Island taking part in the Cobra Island Civil War.

Outback is one of the observers when Cobra Commander leads an attack on Castle Destro.

=== Devil's Due ===
In the Devil's Due series, Outback is one of the many Joes drawn back into service to battle 'Coil'. It is the army created by Serpentor that has just taken over Cobra Island. Outback says to Leatherneck that he, Outback, has just been called up two days ago. Moments later, he is shot in the lower left of his chest. Leatherneck drives off the Cobra attacker, declaring that he is angry because his 'buddy' was injured. Outback survives his injuries.

== Novel ==
Outback plays a supporting role in the G.I. Joe novel 'Fool's Gold'. It was printed by Ballantine Books.
