= Action Force (comic strip) =

British comic book story

- Eagle of Action Force's SAS Force battling Red Shadows on the cover of Battle Action Force (July 7 1984). Art by Ron Turner.
- Publisher: IPC Magazines
- Publication date: 4 June 1983 – 29 November 1986
- Genre: War
- Title(s): Battle/Battle Action Force; 4 to 25 June 1983; 8 October 1983 to 29 November 1986
- Main character(s): Action Force; Red Shadows; Cobra

Creative team
- Writer(s): Gerry Finley-Day; Frank Noble; Ken Noble; Scott Goodall; James Nicholas; P. Rudge; Peter Milligan; Alan McKenzie
- Artist(s): Jim Watson; Vanyo; Geoff Campion; Ron Turner; Cam Kennedy; James Bleach; John Cooper; Josep Gual; Tony Coleman; Manuel Carmona; Enrique Badía Romero
- Editor(s): Terry Magee; Richard Burton

Action Force is a British comic war story published in the weekly anthology Battle from 8 October 1983 to 29 November 1986 by IPC Magazines; for most of the period the comic was retitled Battle Action Force. The story is based on the toyline of the same name produced by Palitoy, and portrayed multinational Europe-based anti-terrorist military organisation Action Force's attempts to thwart the ambitions of the Red Shadows and – later – Cobra. Action Force ended when the toyline's new owners Hasbro discontinued the licence with IPC in favour of a dedicated title produced by Marvel UK.

== Creation ==
While Battle was still among IPC's best-selling comics in the early 1980s, sales of weekly titles on the whole were sliding. In response, editor Terry Magee and group editor Barrie Tomlinson relaxed the title's all-war format in favour of allowing stories less anchored in realism. However, this was only a partial success and from 1981 the comic's budget was such that it had to begin reprinting older stories.

Meanwhile Coalville-based toy company Palitoy had been producing Action Man since 1966, initially as a licensed version of American company Hasbro's G.I. Joe. Action Man had gone on to become something of a cultural icon in Britain, but like boys' comics the market was in decline due to the relatively high price of the 12" 1/6-scale figure and its accessories. Since 1977, the 3¾" toys based on the Star Wars had been a smash success, and showed the size of the market for vast numbers of cheap action figures based on a franchise. As British distributor of Star Wars figures, Palitoy had first-hand experience and created Action Force in 1982 – effectively a range of 3¾" Action Man figures, albeit with non-removable sculpted uniforms. Priced at £1.50 – closer to the pocket money of the average British child – sales were strong.

The initial batch of figures had largely been modelled on real-life soldiers, much like the uniforms of Action Man. However, for the second year of the line Palitoy decided to push the series in a more fantastical direction, devising the idea of Action Force being a European taskforce facing off on the conquest-hungry Baron Ironblood and his Red Shadows minions as a unifying fiction. As part of the line's promotional push they contacted IPC, paying them for a four-week strip in Battle, written by Gerry Finley-Day with art from Jim Watson and based on the toyline's background information. The result was viewed as a success, and Palitoy asked IPC to produce a series of five promotional mini-comics, which were given away as a free gift with the publisher's boys comics (Tiger, Battle and Eagle) weekly between 16 July and 10 September 1983.

== Publishing history ==
Again the experiment was well-received and Palitoy offered to underwrite a regular Action Force strip in Battle. From the 8 October 1983 edition the comic was retitled Battle Action Force and featured three Action Force strips. Due to the toyline splitting up the Action Force organisation into four branches – Z-Force, SAS Force, Q-Force and Space Force – the comic was able to rotate the focus of the strips, allowing the creative teams for each concurrent serial to not worry overly about what others were doing. The third strip in each episode would focus on a particular member of Action Force; another device was flashback origin stories for the characters. Palitoy underwrote the costs of the Action Force material, effectively halving Battle's production costs, while also opening it up to a younger audience.

Despite this steady source of funding, the strips were not entirely popular with the IPC staff. Tomlinson would later bemoan the slow process of getting Palitoy – who he described "weren't really comic people" to approve the art and scripts while keeping to the rigid weekly schedule. Finley-Day felt there was some flexibility, but artist John Cooper was less than impressed after being taken off "Johnny Red" to draw some of the strips, later recalling "I thought it was rubbish... I thought then, 'It's going downhill, this comic'" and particularly disliking Ironblood.

The strips did at least allow the title's falling sales to level out, and in addition to paying for the strips Palitoy would fund a number of circulation-boosting free gifts based on the toyline – arguably reaching its apex when the 14 July 1984 edition featured a cover-mounted Action Force figure, sold in shops for £1.50, with the 24p comic.

However, in 1985 Palitoy took the cheaper route of simply importing figures from Hasbro's own 3¾" toyline, G.I. Joe: A Real American Hero and simply altering some elements of their toy biographies to make them fit in with the European-themed Action Force. This not only meant an influx of characters for the comic but also the outright replacement of the Red Shadows as villains by Cobra. Finley-Day was left with the unenviable job of trying to cope with the overnight change in the strip, coming up with the concept of Ironblood betraying the Red Shadows and taking on the identity of Cobra Commander to raise a new army. While older characters would continue to appear in strips, they were generally only featured in secondary roles.

A more serious blow came when Palitoy's owners General Mills decided to sell its interests in the toy industry. Hasbro purchased the company, and while Action Force continued as an imported version of G.I. Joe they moved to swiftly end the agreement with IPC. The American company had experienced considerable success producing a comic based on the Transformers toyline with Marvel UK, and were keen to see if the process could be repeated with Action Force. The final episodes of Action Force were printed in Battle Action Force in November 1986, after which Marvel would reboot the series with a premise much closer to the American G.I. Joe mythos.

For Battle itself, the loss of Action Force was a serious body-blow. Not only did the comic lose half its funding but it suddenly had to fill the gap with new content. As such, Tomlinson and editor Richard Burton hurriedly came up with the copycat concept of Storm Force, which became one of the few new stories produced alongside an increasing number of reprints. A second attempt at a licensed strip, based on Acamas' X-Changers line, was unsuccessful and in January 1988 Battle Storm Force was merged with Eagle.

== Plot summary ==
The small volcanic island nation of Ascendancy is suddenly invaded by Baron Ironblood and the Red Shadows, who brutally take control. The Baron then contacts the United Nations, threatening to use a super-bomb to destroy the island unless he is given $400m in gold bars. Action Force are activated, and naval arm Q-Force are sent in to scout Ascendancy's coastline. Space Force then drops members of the covert SAS Force onto the island, who pave the way for a landing by infantry unit Z-Force. Ironblood attempts to use an android Muton to activate the bomb before it is frozen by Q-Force, and Ascendancy is freed. However, the Baron and his chief lieutenant the Black Major slip away on a hidden submarine. Ironblood is able to raise a new army at a base in the Andes and attempted revenge by targeting all the leaders of all four branches of Action Force for assassination. The attacks are unsuccessful, and convince Action Force to begin an offensive campaign to bring the Red Shadows down.

SAS Force led the effort, initiating Operation Bloodhound to locate Baron Ironblood's base. Despite several ambushes whittling down the unit, Eagle and his men were ultimately able to thwart an invasion of the Pacific seaboard, though the major Red Shadows once again eluded them. Z-Force meanwhile find themselves trapped in the middle of a coup in the central African state of Duna, but under the command of Slip help stop Major Maddi and his Gibli insurgents from overrunning the country. Baron Ironblood launched a counter-strike by attempting to incinerate SAS Force units searching the Pampas for his base, framing them as saboteurs causing wildfires. The Red Shadows also targeted a Z-Force training exercise in Norway, hoping to capture a new experimental tank, but Steeler was able to prevent the theft.

Leviathan's Q-Force investigated a number of disappearing warships in the South Atlantic, eventually defeating the Red Shadows behind it. Disturbances in equatorial Africa saw Z-Force called in to investigate, leading to a confrontation with the Ironblood-backed Mamba cult. SAS Force again clashed with the Baron when a section training in the Alps stumbled across one of his bases at Castle Arlberg and were captured. The survivors were able to keep the Red Shadows busy until Z-Force reinforcements arrived. The Red Laser then framed a detachment of Q-Force in the experimental Sea Lion submarine for a terrorist attack on Singapore, but they were able to avoid their pursuers long enough to clear their names. The Red Shadows gained a victory when Action Force driver Anton Nobokov was severely injured, and agreed to undergo radical surgery at the hands of Ironblood to save his life. Renamed the Red Jackal, the highly enhanced driver worked with a cell of Turkish terrorists to wipe out diplomats at a conference in Istanbul in the Red Shadows' new Hyena tank.

Ironblood made another attempt to wipe out SAS Force by sending a force to kill them while on an exercise in the Scottish Highlands, taking over nearby towns under the guise of a historical re-enactment to cut them off. Despite heavy casualties the SAS Force team were eventually able to survive the manhunt and drive the Red Shadows off. The Red Shadows were reinforced when they recovered an ancient sea creature called the Kraken, frozen at the North Pole. A section of the recovery team attempted to mutiny but were put down by the Black Major, and the creature was cloned to provide the Baron with an underwater army, which caused heavy SAS Force casualties. After learning the Red Shadows were targeting a strategic Pacific atoll, Z-Force dug in to prevent its capture. Despite a gruelling siege led by the Black Major and the Red Laser, they were eventually able to drive off the invaders. Baron Ironblood attempted to frame Space Force pilot Moondancer for the deaths of two cadets, forcing the pilot to go on the run. He and his team-mate Kiwi were able to uncover a plot to take over a NASA mission to the Moon as a bridgehead; they were able to defeat Red Shadow space pilot Red Wolf and restore Moondancer's reputation.

After the Red Shadows undertook a coordinated campaign of terrorist actions, the United Nations passed a special resolution giving Action Force command of the world's military for a concerted campaign to wipe out Ironblood and his forces once and for all. Sensing defeat, Ironblood transmitted the location of numerous Red Shadow bases to the authorities and headed for a secret hideout unknown to his forces, which he left to be wiped out by Action Force. Instead he reinvented himself as Cobra Commander, and began to set up a new network of terrorist forces. The vengeful Red Jackal pursues him but is captured, and further surgeries see him turned into Destro and recruited to the new Cobra organisation. They recruit a new army of fanatics, including the ninja swordsman Storm Shadow, Australian army deserter Major Bludd and expert saboteur Firefly. In response to the increased activity of Cobra, American intelligence officer Major Flagg is charged with recruiting a new Action Force team to deal with the threat.

Led in the field by Top sergeant Duke, new units underwent rapid training, though Cobra agents such as Zartan attempted to disrupt the process. Other Cobra recruits included Austrian aristocrat and anarchist Baroness while the organisation also captured the plans for Action Force's Hawk helicopter, with Destro making a superior version called the F.A.N.G. Despite these disruptions, the new Action Force team reached operational status, headquartered under the United Nations Secretariat Building, and began planning a trap for Cobra. However their plans were complicated by the return of the Red Shadows, with the Black Major having escaped and freed a large number of prisoners to gain revenge on both Action Force and Cobra, leading to a three-way conflict.

Cobra attempted to steal a large quantity of gold bullion, flying it to a secret location in Egypt, and the new team were sent in to recover it. They were eventually able to recover it after a long battle with heavy casualties on both sides. Action Force were next dispatched to the Yangtze at the request of the Chinese government in response to Cobra activity. Cutter and his unit were ultimately able to foil their attempts to poison the river. The SAS Force meanwhile were called in to battle Cobra-backed insurgents in an Arabian state. Action Force team-member Mutt meanwhile prevented a Cobra assassination attempt against a deposed president under guard in Mexico.

While both on separate training issues in a South American jungle, units of SAS Force and Cobra (led by Major Bludd and Baroness) were captured by hidden SS holdouts – including the still-living Adolf Hitler – which had linked up with the Red Shadows. The two groups were forced to work together to escape in a biref truce, and Eagle defeated Hitler in single combat. Duke meanwhile led an expedition to the South Pole after Cobra attacked a survey party, eventually routing their forces. Cobra continued to back insurgents, and an Action Force response team led by Roadblock found the latest included the expert anti-armour specialist Scrap-Iron. Another series of attacks came in India; Z-Force were dispatched to investigate but soon found they had been infiltrated by Cobra agents. Skip and his men were eventually able to flush them out and counter the Cobra forces. Another Cobra operative, Copperhead, attempted to kidnap the Action Force diver Torpedo in Rotterdam, without success.

Suspected Cobra meddling with the tribes in New Guinea, Action Force members Stalker and Recondo were dispatched to head up the investigation, but were ultimately defeated by an enemy force led by Zartan and Major Bludd. More successful was a mission for polar specialist Snow Job to recover a crashed Super Tornado jet after a crash in the Arctic by preventing Cobra Commander from reaching the crashed aircraft first. Duke, Scarlett and Torpedo meanwhile were assigned to provide security for a royal visit to Italy. With help from flamethrower operative Blowtorch they were able to prevent Cobra assassinating their charges.

The Red Shadows resurfaced once again under the command of the Black Major, attacking the South American country of Valdez; while Action Force were able to battle them the Major got away with much of the country's treasury. Cobra meanwhile made a surprise mass assault on London, and were only forced out of the city by Action Force with considerable effort. Less ambitious was Cobra's attempt to disrupt the production of Battle Action Force, which Action Force soon put down. The Black Major meanwhile reached out to Destro in the hopes of forming an alliance against Cobra Commander but was unable to sway him, though he did destroy a facility full of modified Cobra cadets.

Cobra stepped up their campaign, using Zartan's shape-changing abilities to infiltrate the United Nations, attacking an Action Force investigation of the wreck of the Titanic, unleashing their new Raven fighter on Action Force's Skystriker jets, drawing forces in the Florida swamps into a trap, and attacking Space Force in orbit. Despite heavy losses, Action Force eventually prevailed against the coordinated assault.

== Characters ==
=== Action Force ===
==== Z-Force ====
Action Force's main infantry force. Members include:

- Grant Campbell, codenamed Skip: A Scots playboy businessman who joined Action Force for thrills and rapidly impressed in training before advancing to commander of Z-Force.
- Gianni Paulo Brazzi, codenamed Breaker: An obsessive Italian radio expert.
- Sven Ingleson, codenamed Doc: A veteran Norwegian field medic.
- Rico Gonzalles, codenamed Gaucho: Formerly a circus strongman until conscription into the Mexican military saw him discover a talent for engineering.
- Anton Nobokov, formerly codenamed Jackal: A Latvian defector who was a jeep driver for the Action Force until he was heavily injured and rescued and recruited by Ironblood. See below for more information.
- Calvin Mondale, codenamed Jammer: A UCLA graduate and electronics warfare specialist.
- Hedda Pulver, codenamed Quarrel: The daughter of a Swiss diplomat and now a Rapid Fire Motorcycle rider with excellent martial arts skills.
- Wolfgang Dremmler, codenamed Scout: An East German minesweeper with experience in Soviet Tank Command.
- Andreou Stakis, codenamed Steeler: A Greek expert tank driver.
- Raoul Santilana, codenamed Tracker: A highly qualified field engineer from Madrid.
- Fritz Van Eyck, codenamed Wheels: A dutch mechanical engineer and armoured car driver.

==== SAS Force ====
Action Force's covert operations team. Members include:

- Richard Buckingham, codenamed Eagle: The son of an English earl, trained at Sandhurst and commander of SAS Force.
- Jean-Luc Bouvier, codenamed Barracuda: A French champion swimmer and former Foreign Legion soldier, and SAS Force's premier frogman.
- Jacques-Peter Smith, codenamed Beaver: A man who was trained by Canadian Special Forces and is an expert kayaker.
- Herbert J. Rotweiler, codenamed Blades: An ace pilot from the American mid-west, and lead pilot of the Hawk attack helicopter.
- Pete Sanderson, codenamed Chopper: A former Hollywood stunt flyer from Oklahoma and ace helicopter pilot.
- Chico Rodrigues, codenamed Hunter: A Mexican outlaw granted asylum by Action Force, and highly proficient at driving the Wolverine missile-tank.
- Hans-Jorg Muller, codenamed Quickfire: A German former member of GSG 9 and expert in hand-to-hand combat, doubles as an instructor.
- Pieter Van der Burgh, codenamed Sparrowhawk: Formerly a Belgian parachute display team member turned paratrooper.
- Albert Jones, codenamed Stakeout: A reformed armed robber from Liverpool who specialises in boat operations, and a loyal adjutant to Eagle, who was responsible for giving him a second chance.
- Ragnar Ragnarsson, codenamed Stalker: A quiet Icelandic rally champion turned SAS Panther driver.

==== Q-Force ====
Action Force's naval component. Members include:

- Jamie Maclaren, codenamed Leviathan: Formerly a Royal Navy captain from Glasgow, he is an expert driver and commander of Q-Force.
- Gareth Morgan, codenamed Dolphin: A young naval submarine commander from Wales, and pilot of the Sealion.
- Patrick O'Flaherty, codenamed Phones: A Irish sonar expert and skilled survivalist who maintains a friendly rivalry with Z-Force's Breaker.
- Jean-Paul Rives, codenamed Shark: A French former treasure hunter and current torpedo expert with a wilful streak.
- Hoxworth Whipple, codenamed Surfer: A Hawaiian surfing champion turned Sea Skimmer pilot.

==== Space Force ====
Action Force's orbital space unit. Members include:

- Chuck Connors, codenamed Skyraider: An American former astronaut who transferred to be an instructor at the European Space Agency before becoming commander of Space Force.
- Greg Taggart, codenamed Blast Off: A former Royal Australian Air Force pilot turned Space Force pilot via NASA.
- Lars Elsund, codenamed Hawkwind: A Swedish NATO special operations soldier turned combat pilot.
- Yuri Asimov, codenamed Hot Jets: A Cosmonaut with experience from an exchange with NASA, and considered Space Force's best pilot.
- Scott Walters, codenamed Kiwi: A A New Zealander fitted with a robotic hand after an accident on a rescue mission and an expert computer engineer.
- Tariq El Shafig, codenamed Moondancer: A Middle Eastern ex-jet pilot who flies Space Force's Triad Fighter.

==== Action Force ====
A central multi-discipline team created by Major Flagg to meet the threat of Cobra.

- Duke: A Bostonian field leader of Action Force, having turned down multiple promotions to remain in the field.
- Ace: A Skystriker pilot from Chicago.
- Airborne: An Italian lawyer turned helicopter assault trooper.
- Blowtorch: An incendiary specialist from Toulouse.
- Breaker: A German communications and languages operative.
- Cutter: A hovercraft pilot from New Zealand.
- Deep Six: An Irish submarine pilot.
- Doc: A field medic and pacifist from Jamaica.
- Flash: A laser trooper from Manchester.
- Gung-Ho: A jungle warfare specialist from Florida.
- Mutt: A dog handler from Madrid.
- Recondo: An Australian river trooper.
- Ripcord: A HALO paratrooper from Manchester.
- Roadblock: A burly machine-gunner from the French Congo.
- Scarlett: A Belgian martial arts expert.
- Snow Job: A Scots polar specialist.
- Stalker: A Parisian gang leader turned specialist infantryman.
- Ton-Up: A Swedish tank driver.
- Torpedo: A Dutch SEAL.
- Tripwire: A mine-clearing expert from Swansea.

=== Red Shadows ===
The Red Shadows are a group of fanatical tech-advanced terrorists.

- Baron Ironblood: A revolutionary of uncertain South American origins, hellbent on world conquest.
- Black Major: John Shepherd, formerly a marine commando member of Action Force, was abducted and brainwashed into acting as a central command figure for the Red Shadows' operations.
- Red Vulture: A French getaway driver with impressive mechanical and weaponry skills who leads the Red Shadows' force of Shadowtrak armoured cars.
- Red Laser: A former Japanese student of Laser Technology at Tokyo University-turned-terrorist, who develops the powerful Laser Exterminator cannon for the Red Shadows.
- Red Jackal: Latvian Anton Nokobov, AKA Jackal, suffers huge injuries in a car crash while serving the Soviet army. Medics believed he would be permanently disfigured but Ironblood provided him with mechanical replacements. In return, he leads the Red Shadows' Red Jackal heavy tanks.
- Red Wolf: A former NASA astronaut and friend of Space Force's Moondancer before corruption charges saw him coerced into piloting the sinister Roboskull space-fighter for Ironblood. Later joined Cobra.
- Red Shadows: A huge numbers of drop-outs tempted by promises of riches and power before subsequently being brainwashed by Baron Ironblood, making them fanatics without restraint who will not hesitate to sacrifice themselves on his order.
- Mutons: The strong, near-indestructible robots devised by Ironblood.
- Kraken: An ancient amphibious reptilian biped found frozen at the North Pole that was cloned by Ironblood as an army of marines.

=== Cobra ===
- Cobra Commander: The leader of Cobra and the new identity of Baron Ironblood.
- Baroness: An Austrian heiress-turned-terrorist.
- Copper Head: A mercenary boat pilot, widely believed to be a former speedboat racing champion.
- Destro: A high-ranking Cobra officer and the new identity of the Red Jackal.
- Firefly: A Cobra-allied mercenary and explosives expert of unknown origins.
- Major Bludd: A deserter from the Australian armed forces.
- Scrap Iron: A Peruvian anti-tank specialist.
- Storm Shadow: A ninja assassin from Osaka.
- Zartan: A spy with the ability to change his face instantly.

== Legacy ==
The Red Shadows were used by Devil's Due Publishing for their licensed G.I. Joe comic book series in 2005, though the organisation was substantially different to that featured in Battle Action Force. In 2010, Action Force and the Red Shadows were used as the theme for a fan convention set of toys. IDW Publishing also used the group in their own G.I. Joe comic series from 2013.

Since 2016, copyright to the stories printed in Battle Action Force has been jointly owned by Rebellion Developments and Hasbro.

=== Toys ===
The 2010 Official G.I. Joe Collectors' Club released Black Major's action figure stating that he and the Red Ninjas sided with Cobra after the Red Ninjas' leader Baron Ironblood mysteriously disappeared. Black Major's history of being brainwashed by Baron Ironblood remains intact.

== Reception ==
Despite retaining a cult following, retrospective reviews of Action Force have been mixed. Pat Mills, co-creator of Battle and writer of "Charley's War" (which ran alongside Action Force for much of its run) felt the stories badly affected the comic's maturity, recalling that "Battle lost its edge... I cringe with embarrassment at some of the later stories". Steve Earles of The Quietus was even more scathing during an overview of Battle's history, feeling "it undid all the hard work thus far" and objecting to creators, " some of whom had actually been in the army, trying to breath life into stories based on moulded plastic".

Luke Williams was more sympathetic in a piece for Down The Tubes, feeling it was an important gateway into comics for younger fans and speculated that without it "the title may never have lasted long enough to have published the final Pat Mills 'Charley's War' episodes". Writing for Bleeding Cool, Patrick Lennon defended the fiction as being superior to G.I. Joe.
