= Red Shadow (disambiguation) =

Red Shadow, or Akakage, is a Japanese ninja character.

Red Shadow or Red Shadows may also refer to:

- Red Shadow (comics), a DC Comics supervillain team
- Red Shadow (film), a 2001 film about the hero
- The Red Shadows, a 2009 Italian drama film
- Red Shadows (Howard book), a 1968 collection of short stories and poetry by Robert E. Howard
- Red Shadows (novel) a 2006 novel by Mitchel Scanlon featuring the character Judge Anderson
- Red Shadows, a fictional military group led by Baron Ironblood in the UK Action Force toyline and accompanying comics
