= Mercer (G.I. Joe) =

- G.I. Joe character
- First appearance: 1987
- Voiced by: Kristoffer Tabori (G.I. Joe: The Movie); Maurice LaMarche (DiC Series)

In-universe information
- Affiliation: G.I. Joe
- Specialty: Small Arms Armorer
- File name: Stratton, Felix P.
- Birth place: Spencer, West Virginia
- Rank: E-5 (Sergeant)
- Subgroups: Renegades
- Previous affiliations: Cobra

Mercer is a fictional character from the G.I. Joe: A Real American Hero toyline, comic books and animated series. He is a member of the G.I. Joe Team as one of Sgt. Slaughter's Renegades and debuted in 1987.

== Profile ==
His real name is Felix P. Stratton, and his rank is equivalent to that of sergeant E-5. Mercer was born in Spencer, West Virginia.

Mercer's primary military specialty is small arms armorer. He was the only known Cobra Viper to defect to the G.I. Joe team and survive. He joined Cobra to find adventure and monetary rewards, but soon became disenchanted with the ideology of Cobra. He was able to flee Cobra Island by stealing a hydrofoil while being chased across the Gulf of Mexico. Mercer is proficient with all of small arms and explosive devices used by Cobra.

The Sgt. Slaughter's Renegades sub team does not officially exist and they do not answer to any other authority. They are able to function without much restraint, but on the other hand they have no support if they become compromised.

== Toys ==
Mercer was first released as an action figure in 1987, as part of the Sgt. Slaughter's Renegades three-pack along with Red Dog and Taurus.

A new version of Mercer was released in 1991. This version is given the real name of Richard Cecil rather than Felix Stratton. A third version of Mercer was released as an exclusive figure for the 2006 G.I. Joe Collector's Convention in New Orleans, Louisiana. The filecard returns his real name to Felix Stratton, explaining his name change and the look of his 1991 incarnation as an attempt to hide his identity.

== Comics ==
Mercer appeared in the Devil's Due G.I. Joe series. He leads an assault team onto Cobra Island during their second Civil War. Serpentor had formed a new army and had crafted an EMP gun which was disrupting electronics signals. Mercer leads Jinx, Sci-Fi, Hacker, Mainframe and Flash. The last two become separated from the rest. Hacker is badly injured. Mercer leads a retreat while the lost Joes manage to destroy the EMP generators. Due to Cobra interference, Mainframe and Flash do not survive.

Mercer is later one of the Joes kept on the team after the Jugglers place General Philip Rey in charge. After the team is reorganized as a smaller unit under General Joseph Colton, Mercer served as a reservist. He was called into duty to aid other Joes in securing an abandoned Cobra bioweapons facility in Manhattan. While the other Joes under Beach Head storm the lab itself, Mercer battled Cobra operative Neurotoxin one-on-one. Mercer later returns to duty during "World War III", deploying to Iran, joining Dusty and Airtight in battling Cobra forces there.

A second G.I. Joe/Transformers crossover series, set in alternate reality, has Mercer featured in the last few issues. He leads an attack on Cobra Island in order to shut down Cobra's alliance with the Decepticons. An energy transfer device malfunctions, bombarding the island. Mercer is incinerated in a random blast.

== Animated series ==
=== G.I. Joe: The Movie ===
Mercer appeared in the 1987 animated film G.I. Joe: The Movie by Sunbow and Marvel, as a member of Sgt. Slaughter's Renegades. He was voiced by Kristoffer Tabori. Mercer assists Red Dog and Taurus in helping Sgt. Slaughter train Lt. Falcon when General Hawk reassigns him to the Slaughterhouse following Lt. Falcon's court martial. At one point during the training, Mercer had to help Lt. Falcon with the pull-ups.

=== DiC ===
Mercer appeared in the DiC G.I. Joe animated series, voiced by Maurice LaMarche. In the episode "The Eliminator," Mercer is suspected of leaking information to Cobra. He played a part in the episode "Kindergarten Commandos", where he and some children fight Cobra Commander and Overkill.
