= Sgt. Slaughter (G.I. Joe) =

Character from the G.I. Joe franchise

- G.I. Joe character
- Sgt. Slaughter as seen in G.I. Joe: The Movie.
- First appearance: 1985
- Voiced by: Sgt. Slaughter

In-universe information
- Affiliation: United States Marine Corps; G.I. Joe
- Specialty: Drill Instructor
- File name: CLASSIFIED
- Birth place: Parris Island, South Carolina
- SN: 817-76-981
- Rank: E-7 (Gunnery Sergeant)
- Primary MOS: Infantry/Drill Instructor
- Secondary MOS: Survival Instructor
- Subgroups: Slaughter's Marauders

Sgt. Slaughter is a fictional character from the G.I. Joe: A Real American Hero toy line. G.I. Joe modelled the character on the American professional wrestling character Sgt. Slaughter (Robert Rudolph Remus). Sgt. Slaughter's G.I. Joe version makes no reference to his professional wrestling inspiration, although the character uses wrestling moves and was voiced by Remus. Remus also appeared in person to introduce the episodes that were originally G.I. Joe: The Movie and was the spokesman for the G.I. Joe toy line from 1989 to early 1990, introducing new vehicles and figures in commercials.

Four versions of the Sgt. Slaughter action figure were released in the 1980s. The character is known as Sgt. Slammer in Action Force, the UK version of G.I. Joe.

== Profile ==
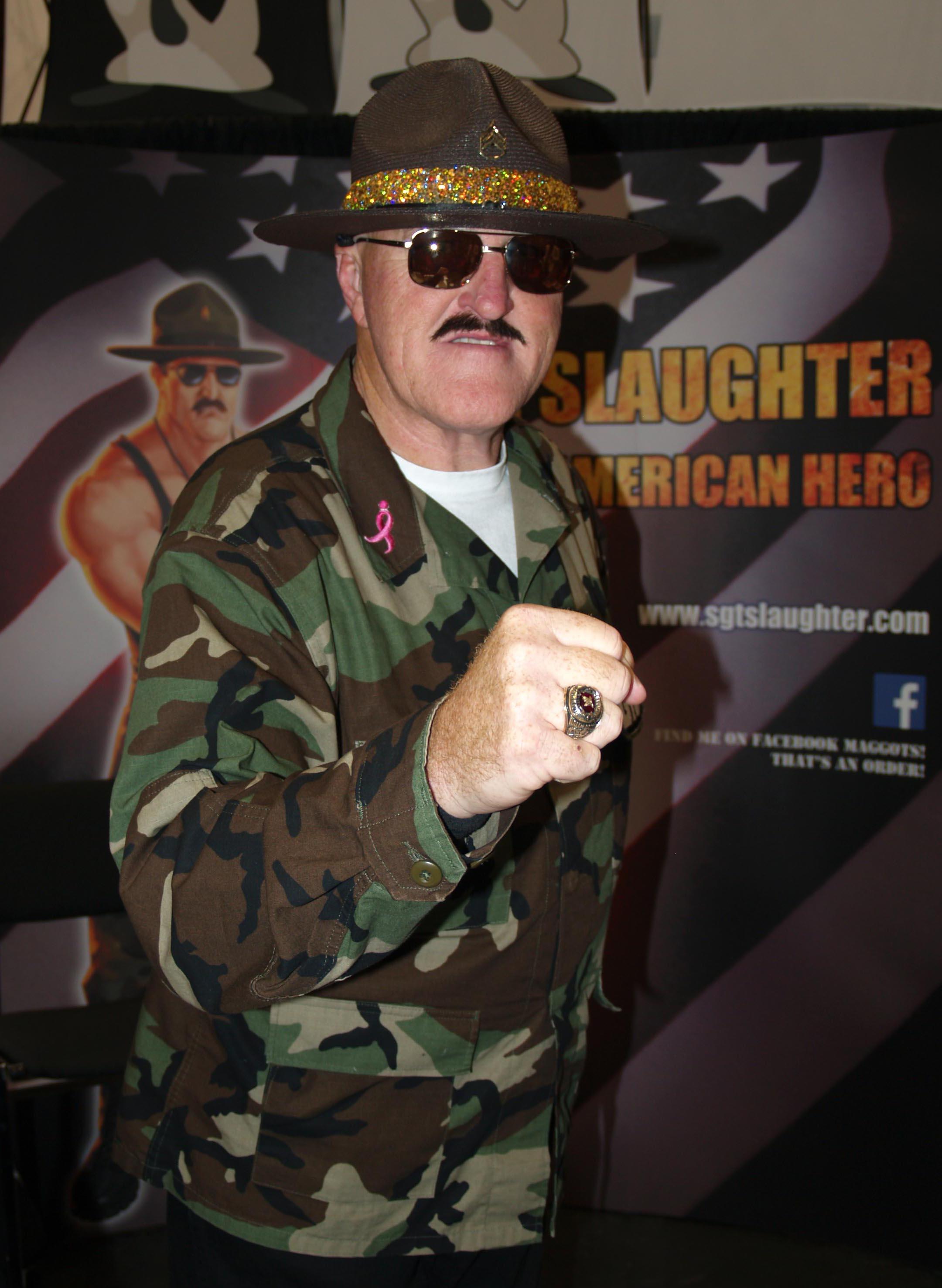
Robert Rudolph Remus in-character as Sgt. Slaughter, pictured in 2013

Sgt. Slaughter was born in Parris Island, South Carolina, and during his service in the United States Marine Corps, spent time dressing down trainees in Camp Lejeune. His real name is top secret. According to the G.I. Joe storyline, since just about every member of the G.I. Joe Team is qualified to be a drill instructor, it takes a special brand of heavy duty honcho to keep them squared away. He serves as the team's special drill instructor, as mentioned in the animated movie, and also engages in special missions.

== Action figures ==
From 1985-1989, there were new Sgt. Slaughter action figures almost every year. His first figure was a mail-away exclusive, depicting Slaughter in an olive-drab "USA" tanktop and black wrestling tights along with his campaign hat and silver sunglasses. His 1986 mass-release figure was packed with the "Triple-T" (Tag Team Terminator) tank, and depicted him in a black tanktop and camouflage BDU pants, which would serve as the basis for his media appearances. Hasbro, the maker of G.I. Joe toys, discontinued production in mid-1990, partly because of the World Wrestling Federation's new storyline featuring Slaughter as a "bad guy" and, in storyline, an Iraqi sympathizer.

Sgt. Slaughter led two G.I. Joe special teams. One was the Renegades, a mercenary-type group that partakes in highly sensitive, bottom drawer-classified missions for the United States. They included former football thug David "Red Dog" Taputapu, circus performer/Interpol agent Varujan "Taurus" Ayvazyan, and ex-Cobra Viper Felix "Mercer" Stratton.

Later, he led the Marauders, a G.I. Joe assault squad released in 1989, and composed of Spirit, the tracker; Low-Light, the night operations sniper; Barbecue, the firefighter; Mutt, the K-9 handler; and Footloose, the ground pounder.

In 1988, Sgt. Slaughter was released as a figure for the driver of the vehicle toy called 'Warthog A.I.F.V.'

For the 2006 G.I. Joe Convention, which Remus attended as guest of honor, a new figure was made reusing older figure parts, including the original toy's head.

For the 2010 San Diego Comic Con, Hasbro revealed two new figures of Sgt. Slaughter would be sold exclusively at the con, one based on his 1985 mail-away toy while the other on his 1986 Triple T driver toy. The former figure includes a whistle, baton, microphone and title belt while the latter has a whistle, baton, machine gun, bipod and revolver.

For the 2024 San Diego Comic Con, Hasbro revealed a new Transformers Collaborative Series release, featuring a recreation of the 1986 Sgt. Slaughter figure along with a Triple-T Tank that converts into the Autobot Kup (who was introduced in 1986's The Transformers: The Movie and has been depicted as a drill instructor for the Autobots). The set also came with a recreation of Leatherneck's original 1986 figure.

== Comics ==
=== Marvel Comics ===
In the Marvel Comics G.I. Joe series, his first appearance is in issue #48. The drill sergeant is confronted by suspicious Joe members who are part of the top-level security team. He defeats them in hand-to-hand combat, then gets the explanation that the master of disguise known as Zartan is loose. Sgt. Slaughter leads the Joes that he just defeated in securing the top-level exits. He finds Zartan fighting another Joe, Gung-Ho, having taken his image. Both claim the other is the enemy. Sgt. Slaughter knocks out Zartan with one punch, and attributes his correct choice to luck.

In issue #51, he places Thunder in charge of the Joe HQ, and accompanies Cross-Country on the H.A.V.O.C. to pursue Zartan and the Dreadnoks after another escape attempt. After losing track of Zartan and his accompanying Dreadnoks, Sgt. Slaughter takes the H.A.V.O.C.'s hovercraft for recon. He finds them, but is fooled by the disguises the Dreadnoks have worked up.

=== Devil's Due ===
Sgt. Slaughter is not listed on the official listing of personnel in the Battle Files mini-series, which lists all active and reservist members. However, Sgt. Slaughter is listed as an active member of the G.I. Joe team in G.I. Joe: America's Elite #28. He is later seen working with Joe veteran 'Jane' to evacuate endangered Joe support personnel. In G.I. Joe: Frontline, a character clearly based on Sgt. Slaughter appears in a flashback as a drill sergeant for incoming Joe trainees, a.k.a. Greenshirts. He works closely with Beach-Head.

== Animated series ==
=== Sunbow ===
Sgt. Slaughter was featured in the Sunbow/Marvel G.I. Joe animated series. Sgt. Slaughter is often described as the toughest of all the Joes. As an instructor and trainer, he spurs his trainees through the most physically challenging exercises, which he can perform quite easily. He is almost unnaturally strong and can fend entirely for himself in the roughest missions. In fact, he easily fends off several dozen B.A.T.s by himself in two episodes of the five-part second-season premiere, "Arise, Serpentor, Arise!". Sgt. Slaughter even uses the fingernail on his thumb as a convenient screwdriver to gain access to the circuitry of an electronically locked door and short it open. Sgt. Slaughter is often listed fifth in command of the G.I. Joe team as a Special Drill Instructor (behind General Hawk, Duke, Flint and Beach Head respectively). He is a legend among his fellow Joes and sometimes shares command with Beach Head as fourth in command.

He first appeared in "Arise, Serpentor, Arise!". In this miniseries, he is first seen coming to the Joes' aid in a battle with Cobra, fighting off numerous B.A.T.s. and turning the tide. After the Joes win, Sgt. Slaughter is called upon by General Hawk to retrain the G.I. Joe team, because they have lost focus, to which he accepts. As an added bonus, Sgt. Slaughter reminded General Hawk that he is a Joe as well and has him undergo training too. Later, Sgt. Slaughter, Beach Head, and Low-Light infiltrate the Dreadnoks camp and find out about a Cobra plot to raid the tombs of infamous conquerors in history. As G.I. Joe sets off to protect these tombs, Sgt. Slaughter defends the tomb of Sun Tzu and prevents Doctor Mindbender from stealing Sun Tzu's DNA. Slaughter then becomes Mindbender's alternate DNA candidate in the latter's attempt to create the Cobra Emperor and is lured into being captured. He escapes during Cobra Commander's sabotage with a mutated virus resulting in a monster. Sgt. Slaughter defeats the escaped monster only to be subdued and have his DNA stolen, though he is freed by Cobra Commander. Sgt. Slaughter destroys his own DNA sample while Serpentor is born, though he still shows features of Sgt. Slaughter's strength and willingness to lead the front lines. When Serpentor is born, Sgt. Slaughter challenges him to combat and they battle throughout the Terror Drome. Sgt. Slaughter has been mortal enemies with Serpentor ever since.

In the episode "My Brother's Keeper", Sgt. Slaughter accompanies Sci-Fi to a science fiction convention where Doctor Mindbender is recruiting handicapped scientist Dr. Jeremy Penser to perfect his latest weapon. The two Joes, along with Penser's brother, save Penser after he sabotages the weapon.

Sgt. Slaughter had another prominent role in the episode "Ninja Holiday". In this episode, he accepts an invitation, intended for Wet Suit, to compete in a martial arts tournament hosted by Cobra Commander in secret. Going by Wet Suit's identity, Sgt. Slaughter learns of the purpose of the contest – to find a candidate for a Cobra assassin. After winning the competition and helping the Joes foil the plot, Sgt. Slaughter learns he was supposed to assassinate Serpentor and is disappointed about missing this opportunity.

=== G.I. Joe: The Movie ===
Sgt. Slaughter plays a vital role in G.I. Joe: The Movie. He is shown as the leader and special drill instructor for the Renegades, as well as Lt. Falcon after the latter was court-martialed by General Hawk for dereliction of duty and reassigned to the Slaughterhouse at Duke's persuasion. Sgt. Slaughter considered Lt. Falcon a foul-up and has his introduced Renegades Mercer, Red Dog, and Taurus re-train him to live up to Duke and General Hawk's expectations. Sgt. Slaughter, the Renegades, and Lt. Falcon are sent on a unarmed reconnaissance mission to the Terror Drome where they overhear Cobra's plan for a second attack on G.I. Joe to steal the Broadcast Energy Transmitter (B.E.T.). Sgt. Slaughter plants a bomb inside the Terror Drome. He convinces the Renegades to save Lt. Falcon when he is captured and the five escape the Terror Drome before it is destroyed by the bomb. They are some of the last Joes available for the final battle. Slaughter's use of wrestling moves is vital in saving the day when he manages to defeat Nemesis Enforcer in combat.

=== DiC ===
In DiC's G.I. Joe cartoon, Sgt. Slaughter was made third-in-command of G.I. Joe. He appeared in the "Operation Dragonfire" mini-series, "Revenge of the Pharaohs," "The No Zone Conspiracy," "Pigskin Commandos," "Cold Shoulder," That's Entertainment", "I Found You Evy," "An Officer and a Viper Man."

In "Pigskin Commandos", Slaughter spends time visiting his adult sister.

== Other works ==
Sgt. Slaughter's figure is briefly featured in the fiction novel 6 Sick Hipsters. In the story, the character Paul Achting spent four years collecting G.I. Joe figures to set up a battle scene between the Joes and Cobra. As he imagined the characters in his head, he described as Sgt. Slaughter, behind the Joes on front lines of the battle, "wearing his distinctive mirrored shades, sat uncomplainingly in the cab of the idling Triple T Tank. He was speaking on a transistor radio to Dial Tone, the communications specialist, back at G.I. Joe headquarters. He could smell, almost taste, evil in the air." Another figure of Sgt. Slaughter was made under Valaverse Action Force, an independent toy line that originated from a Kickstarter campaign. This version of the character is unrelated from the G.I. Joe line and is featured in Valaverse's comics of the toy line.
