= Bionic Six =

1987 animated television series

- Genre: Superhero
- Created by: Ron Friedman
- Written by: Ron Friedman; Gordon Bressack; Craig Miller; Mark Nelson
- Directed by: Osamu Dezaki; Toshiyuki Hiruma; William T. Hurtz; Steve Clark; Lee Mishkin; Sam Nicholson; John Walker
- Creative director: Bob Dranko
- Voices of: Norman Bernard; Carol Bilger; Bobbie Block; Jennifer Darling; Jim MacGeorge; Alan Oppenheimer; Hal Rayle; Neil Ross; John Stephenson; Brian Tochi; Frank Welker
- Composers: Thomas Chase; Steve Rucker
- Countries of origin: United States; Japan
- Original language: English
- No. of seasons: 2
- No. of episodes: 65 (list of episodes)

Production
- Executive producers: Yutaka Fujioka; Eiji Katayama
- Producers: Gerald Baldwin; Sachiko Tsuneda; Shunzo Kato; Shiro Aono
- Editor: Sam Horta
- Running time: 22 minutes
- Production companies: MCA TV; TMS Entertainment, Inc.

Original release
- Network: Syndication
- Release: April 19 – November 12, 1987

Bionic Six (バイオニックシックス, Baionikku Shikkusu) is a 1987 animated television series. It was produced and animated by TMS Entertainment, Inc. and distributed, through first-run syndication, by MCA TV, years before the latter company became NBCUniversal Syndication Studios. Renowned Japanese animation director Osamu Dezaki was involved as chief supervising director, and his distinctive style (as seen in Golgo 13 and Cobra) is evident throughout all its episodes. Character designs were by Nobuteru Yūki.

The title characters of the series are a family of machine-enhanced human beings each possessing unique powers after being augmented with bionic technology. Each family member is given specific bionic powers, and thus they form a superhero team called the Bionic Six.

== Development ==
Friedman spoke on how the property came about stating "The idea was what if the Bionic man marries the Bionic woman but they need some other things to be the Bionic Six, so I gave them a bionic pet I forget what the name of it, which was a gorilla and then two kids"

== Plot ==
"A family, brought together by fate and given superpowers through the miracle of modern science!"

— narration from the theme song.

In the near future (some unspecified decades after 1999), Professor Dr. Amadeus Sharp Ph.D., head of the Special Projects Labs (SPL), creates a new form of technology to augment humans through bionics. His first subject was Jack Bennett, a test pilot who secretly acted as Sharp's field agent, Bionic-1.

On a family ski vacation in the Himalayas, an alien spacecraft triggers an avalanche that buries the entire family, exposing them to the unusual radiation of a mysterious buried object. Jack frees himself but discovers his family in a comatose state. Theorizing that Jack's bionics protected him from the radiation, Professor Sharp implants bionic technology in the others, awakening them. Afterward, the family operates incognito as a publicly lauded team of adventuring superheroes, the Bionic Six.

The primary villain of the series is mad scientist Doctor Scarab, along with his gang of henchmen – Glove, Madam-O, Chopper, Mechanic, and Klunk – accompanied by Scarab's legion of drone robots called Cyphrons. Scarab is the alter ego of Wilmer Sharp, Professor Sharp's brother. Obsessed with obtaining immortality and ruling the world, Scarab believes that the key to both goals lies in the secret bionic technology invented by his brother, ever plotting to possess it.

== Characters ==
=== Heroes ===
The Bionic Six (l-r): Karate-1, IQ, Sport-1, Rock-1, Bionic-1, Mother-1.

- Professor Dr. Amadeus Sharp Ph.D. is the genius scientist who infused the Bionic Six team with bionics. All his research is supported by the government, and Sharp's technology must be periodically reviewed by government agency Q10. He lives alone in his private museum, which houses his secret Special Projects Lab, the hidden base of the Bionic Six. Amadeus is also Scarab's brother. Sharp excels in the fields of aeronautics, animatronics, archaeology, bionics, and neurology. He was voiced by Alan Oppenheimer.

The Bennett family includes patriarch Jack, matriarch Helen, and their four children, Eric, Meg, J.D., and Bunji. They live in a secluded oceanfront home in the fictional city of Cypress Cove, in northern California. Each member wears a special ring and a "wristcomp" (a mini-computer hardwired into the wrist), which they use to activate their bionic powers. The Bionic Six can also combine their powers by joining hands, creating a "Bionic Link" to amplify their abilities.

- Jack Bennett aka Bionic-1 is an engineer, an expert test pilot, and the secret agent known to the world only as "Bionic-One". He enjoys gourmet cooking, even participating in the Paris Food Conference. Bionic-1's powers are mostly related to his bionic eyes (including "x-ray vision", telescopic sight, energy blasts, and low-powered beams that temporarily cause electronic devices to malfunction or even turn against their users), and enhanced hearing (this last capability beyond even the powers of the other team members, who each possess superhuman levels of hearing in their own right). His family was initially unaware of his secret bionic identity until bestowed with powers of their own. Bionic-1 was voiced by John Stephenson.
- Helen Bennett aka Mother-1 is Jack's wife. She is an oceanographer and an accomplished marine biologist. Mother-1 possesses various ESP powers that allow her to occasionally see glimpses of the future, telepathically communicate with other sentient and non-sentient beings, determine the function and operation of mechanical devices by mentally "tracing" their internal workings, and can mentally project hologram-like optical illusions. She is also an accomplished fighter, having bested Dr. Scarab's henchwoman Madame-O on the occasions when the two physically fought each other one-on-one. She was voiced by Carol Bilger.
- Eric Bennett aka Sport-1 is Jack's and Helen's blond, athletic son. At local Albert Einstein High School, Eric is a shortstop on the baseball team, the Einstein Atoms. He routinely employs baseball vernacular in his dialogue. As Sport-1, he employs electromagnetic powers to attract or repel metallic objects with tremendous force, meld them together, or even rip them apart. This force is directional and – by varying the configuration of his hands, or by using one or both arms – Sport-1 can adjust the strength of attraction or repulsion. He can also use objects as he would a baseball bat, including steel beams, lampposts and other objects (including baseball bats) to redirect incoming objects and energy blasts; infused by the same field that comes from his arms, he can use those ordinarily fragile objects to hit and deflect things they normally could not. In one instance, he used a steel beam to hit an incoming asteroid. He was voiced by Hal Rayle.
- Meg Bennett aka Rock-1 is Jack's and Helen's daughter and Eric's younger sister. Meg is an excitable, and somewhat ditsy, music-loving teenager. She is prone to habitual use of the future-slang phrase "So-LAR!" (comparable to "awesome"), as well as the prefixes "Mega-!" (as befitting her first name) and "Ultra-!" At Albert Einstein High School, Meg is a member of the debate team; in a number of episodes, she is seen dating a classmate named Bim. As Rock-1, she can emit sonic beams from blaster units mounted on her shoulders – the blaster units are only visible when she assumes "bionic mode". While all of the Six can run at superhuman speed, Meg is the fastest among them by a large margin. She and Eric are the only Bennett offspring biologically related to each other, and to their parents. Meg was voiced by Bobbi Block.
- James Dwight "J.D." Corey aka IQ is Jack's and Helen's remarkably intelligent, adopted African-American son. He enjoys amateur boxing, although he is not particularly skilled at it. As IQ, he has super-intelligence (as befitting his code-name); moreover, while all of the Six have superhuman strength, J.D. is the strongest among them by a large margin. He was the only team member whose bionic code name did not include the number "1" as a suffix. He was voiced by Norman Bernard.
- Bunjiro "Bunji" Tsukahara aka Karate-1 is Jack's and Helen's Japanese foster son. He was placed under their guardianship after his own father disappeared 10 years earlier somewhere in the East. Bunji is an avid karate enthusiast. As Karate-1, his already-formidable martial arts prowess is enhanced by his bionics. He is the most agile among the Six, and his super-sharp reflexes are surpassed only by those of Rock-1. He was voiced by Brian Tochi.
- F.L.U.F.F.I. is a gorilla-like robot who lives as a housekeeper with the Bennetts. He regularly demonstrates a comical craving for aluminum cans that extends to casually devouring the Bennetts' cookware, vehicles, or other metal objects. Despite his bungling behavior, he nonetheless proves helpful around the Bennett home, or assisting the Bionic Six with physical tasks in the field. F.L.U.F.F.I. was voiced by Neil Ross.

=== Villains ===
The primary villain of the series is Dr. Scarab – real name Dr. Wilmer Sharp Ph.D., who is Amadeus Sharp's brother. Scarab is a hefty, egotistically brilliant and occasionally comical man who yearns for the secret to eternal life and world domination. His right eye has been modified with a monocle that has a low-powered scanner that can detect individuals with bionics, even when they are disguised, and a destructive, high-powered beam. In rare instances throughout the series, he seemingly demonstrates superhuman, bionic strength of his own (on at least one occasion, he picked up Mother-One effortlessly and threw her around; in another instance, he was seen carrying as much solid gold out of Fort Knox as his other bionic minions–several hundred pounds' worth). He was voiced by Jim MacGeorge.

Dr. Scarab has assembled a motley team of henchmen (described below), imbued with an apparently lesser form of the same bionic powers employed by the Bionic Six. Another one of Scarab's goals in the series is to try to figure out the secrets behind his brother's superior bionics knowledge.

- Glove is a purple-skinned villain named for his left-handed blaster glove which is capable of firing both beams and projectiles. He serves as the field leader in Scarab's evil plans (hence made a frequent target for punishment for failures) and constantly vies to replace Dr. Scarab as leader. Although cunning and vicious, he tends to retreat at the first sign of defeat. His strength varies, as in some instances, he seems to be the equal of Bionic-1, while in one instance, he was able to physically overpower and dominate both Bionic-1 and Karate-1 at the same time. He was voiced by Frank Welker.
- Madame-O, the only female member of Dr. Scarab's crew, is an enigmatic blue-skinned femme fatale who wears a full face mask and uses a harp-like weapon to fire sonic blasts. She has a verbal tic of ending many of her statements with the word "...darling". While she does possess super strength, she is not as strong as many of the other characters; Mother-1 was able to defeat her in physical struggles on various occasions. Before her transformation, she actually appeared to be an elderly woman. She was voiced by Jennifer Darling.
- Mechanic is a dim-witted, childish brute who employs various mechanical tools as weapons – nail or rivet guns, throwing circular saw blades, using a large wrench as a bludgeon. Despite his short temper, he has a soft spot for animals and an engrossing fondness for (in-universe) children's television cartoons. He was voiced by Frank Welker.
- Chopper is a chain-wielding thug who articulates sounds mimicking a revving motorcycle. He is sometimes depicted riding a three-wheeled motorcycle vehicle. Like both Mechanic and Glove, he was voiced by Frank Welker (who, perhaps by intentional design, had previously voiced another villain by the name of Chopper, with exactly the same voice and "vocal mannerisms", in a 1970s-era cartoon titled Wheelie and the Chopper Bunch).
- Klunk is a patchwork monstrosity who appears to be made out of living glue and rarely speaks coherently. Immediately after Klunk's creation, Scarab noted to himself to "use a little less power next time". While he is relatively unintelligent (even moreso than Mechanic), Klunk's unparalleled strength (his strength appears to surpass even that of I.Q, the strongest member of the Bionic Six), high resistance to physical attacks, and his gooey body's ability to engulf his opponent cause him to be considered one of the most dangerous opponents to engage in battle with – even Dr. Scarab fears him to some extent. Unlike the other minions of Dr. Scarab, he is (understandably) horrified by his own transformation and longs to be human again. Like Jack "Bionic-1" Bennett, he was voiced by John Stephenson.

Dr. Scarab has tried to create additional minions with limited success, usually due to envying interference from his existing henchmen. Some of these include:

- Mrs. Scarab aka Scarabina – Dr. Scarab's attempt at cloning a perfect mate for himself: a woman possessing his own intelligence added to Mother-1's beauty and ESP powers. Madame-O tampered with the lab equipment during her creation, resulting in an obnoxious female version of Dr. Scarab who was utterly devoted to him. Scarab, though repulsed by her, attempted to use her to his advantage. She eventually caught on to his manipulation and left him. She returned in a subsequent episode, trying to win his affection by creating opposite-sex versions of his own henchmen to overcome the Bionic Six through sheer numbers.
- Shadow Boxer – rescuing a down-on-his-luck former boxing champion from arrest and trying to give him powers, Dr. Scarab instead accidentally creates Shadow Boxer due to Glove's interference. Rather than becoming merely another super strong minion, Shadow Boxer acquired the ability to solidify his shadow and to act through it at will. He apparently lost this ability when Bionic-1 exposed his shadow to an intense light and it faded away.

Where covert action is called for, Scarab and his gang go disguised via their "Bionic Masking Units". To disengage these electronically imparted disguises, they slam their fists to their chest insignias and exclaim, "Hail Scarab!" (Scarab, however, vainly exclaims, "Hail me!"). Doing so serves a secondary purpose – the activation of a temporary strength enhancement.

In addition to his henchmen, Scarab also uses robots of his own design, called Cyphrons, in battles against the Bionic Six. The Cyphrons are, like the rest of his minions, generally incompetent but dangerous in large numbers. Attempts by Scarab to create more advanced Cyphron units are shown to backfire.

=== Supporting characters ===
Bionic Six episodes also featured a number of recurring, supporting characters.

- Bunji's Father: His (unnamed) father, who taught him his martial arts skills but suddenly and mysteriously vanished over 10 years ago (causing Bunji to be adopted by the Bennetts in the first place), shows up in several episodes of the series during its run. He assists his son in instances where his son's life is in danger and there is no other apparent way to save him. It is implied that he has ascended to some unknown, higher plane of existence through his martial arts training, and has become a quasi-immortal being. His efforts at saving his son are usually orchestrated in ways that are unseen and unnoticed by everyone, including his son, and his own son does not even know for sure that his father is alive or what has become of him until much later into the series. He first appeared in episode #2, "Enter the Bunji".
- Perceptor: Peter Wilcox was one of the finest bionic researchers under Professor Sharp. Due to impatience, Wilcox tested their bionic experiment on himself. The experiment bestowed on Wilcox bionic abilities, but at the cost of his own sight. Blaming technology for his blindness, Wilcox became the anti-technology vigilante known as the Perceptor. However, after a confrontation with Sharp and the Bionic Six, Wilcox renounces his terrorist activities to become a hero and occasional ally of the Bionic Six. Perceptor was voiced by Neil Ross.
- Dr. Hugo Fish: An eccentric scientist inventor and colleague to Professor Sharp, Dr. Fish consistently creates devices with unusual functions, including foodstuff that grants enhanced intelligence, a device that gives people the ability to recreate famous works of art, an animatronic theme park, and a device capable of generating giant mushrooms. These quirky inventions often put him in crossfire between the Bionic Six and Scarab's group. Dr. Fish was voiced by Howard Morris.
- The Bandroids are androids, created by Dr. Bruce "Bad Brains" Huxter, designed to perform as a musical band. The Bandroids are guitarist Rivet Rick, keyboardist Techno Tex, bassist Metalhand, and drummer Bob. Each Bandroid has their musical instrument designed into their chassis and showcases some special ability: Rivet Rick can generate force fields, Techno Tex is equipped with two six-shooters, Metalhand can grow in size and has a jet pack, and Bob can generate electrical blasts from his drumsticks. The Bandroids perform in concert and are reported to have had four consecutive number one hits.
- Kaleidoscope: Harlan Nails was a brilliant scientist who worked alongside Prof. Sharp in the field of Bionics. During that time, he invented a device that could temporarily rearrange an item's atomic structure. After Sharp snubbed him, Dr. Nails continued to experiment independently, soon partnering with Dr. Scarab. Nails created an outfit from his invention to become a master of disguise, calling himself Kaleidoscope. He became Scarab's partner in crime, until Scarab betrayed him. Kaleidoscope was the true inventor of much of Scarab's technology, including his Bionic Masking Units and the first-generation Cyphrons. After spending 20 years in jail, Nails is released into the custody of the Bionic Six to help track down Scarab. However, the newly escaped Kaleidoscope has only one thing on his mind: revenge on both Dr. Scarab and Prof. Sharp. Kaleidoscope's suit is one-of-a-kind, and attuned so that only he can use it. Unlike the Bionic Masking Units employed by Scarab's minions, Kaleidoscope's suit can not only create illusions, but also temporarily reconfigure matter; in one instance, he once transformed his body into a large metal plate of armor, shielding the Bionic Six from a massive energy beam intended to kill them all. In "I, Scarab", Kaleidoscope is blackmailed by Sharp to help Perceptor and the Bandroids rescue the captured Bionic Six and help defeat Scarab's mind control over the world. Kaleidoscope yells at the group over how he is no hero, but a crook. Sharp points out that Harlan has not committed any crimes since his escape from prison. Kaleidoscope admits that his time in jail soured him on crime and aids the group in defeating Scarab, earning a pardon as a reward.

== Bionic Six vehicles ==
- The Sky Dancer is the Bionic Six's jet for long-range missions. The Sky Dancer can carry the Bionic six and all their support vehicles. It is housed on the Bionic base and enters via an underwater runway.
- The M.U.L.E.S. Van or Mobile Utility Energizing Station, is a support vehicle that can fly, carry the team on short-range missions, and carry their motorcycles and Quad ATVs. At one time, the Van was outfitted with crab armor.

== Episode list ==
The first season of Bionic Six introduces viewers to the Bennett family, and to Scarab and his goons. Karate-1's origin is explored, and the mystery of his missing father is introduced. The origin of both the Bionic Six and of Scarab and his lackeys is revealed early on in the 22-episode run. The supporting characters of Dr. Fish and Perceptor are also introduced.

The second season continues on from the first seamlessly. Old supporting characters like Perceptor and Dr. Fish return, and new characters, such as the Bandroids are brought aboard. The second season includes a two-part episode titled "I, Scarab", wherein Professor Sharp assembles a second Bionic Six group to rescue the original team. This second team is made up of supporting characters from prior episodes: Kaleidoscope, Perceptor, and the Bandroids.

The series finale finds several of the members from the Bionic Six trapped for a time in a dimension where the "cartoon characters" (with an animation style highly reminiscent of Tiny Toons and Animaniacs, an animated series TMS would, during this time, soon work on) of their favorite TV shows exist; after I.Q., Rock-One and Karate-One escape, I.Q notes that in the cartoon dimension, the characters were unaware that they were imaginary characters; he then wonders if it is at all possible that he and everyone else in the "real" world are cartoon characters themselves. His family dismisses his thoughts as meaningless babble – as a bunch of characters from the cartoon dimension walk outside the Bennett family's residence and break the fourth wall as the episode fades out.

== Merchandising ==
=== Action figures ===
Produced by LJN in 1986, the line consisted of 13 figures (Jack, Helen, J.D., Eric, Meg, Bunji, F.L.U.F.F.I., Doctor Scarab, Glove, Mechanic, Madame-O, Chopper, and Klunk), five vehicles and one playset. These figures and vehicles were made up of plastic and die-cast metal with some of the figures having transparent limbs. The 13 figures were designed and copyrighted by Paul Samulski on behalf of LJN. F.L.U.F.F.I. the robot ape was difficult to find early in the show's release, but became easier to come by later as the line lost popularity. Today, the line remains moderately collectible with the playset and vehicles being the hardest to come across.

=== Books ===
Grosset & Dunlap Publishing produced the Bionic Six Super Picture Book, a collection of color and black & white pin-ups of the Bionic Six, Dr. Sharp, F.L.U.F.F.I., and Scarab's team. The books's art was supplied by Vince Perez and Lisa Santangelo.

A Bionic Six comic book (illustration credited to "Espinoza & Hooper" [sic]) advertised mid-1988 for forthcoming release by independent publisher New Comics Group never materialized.
