= Hal Rayle =

American voice actor (born 1955)

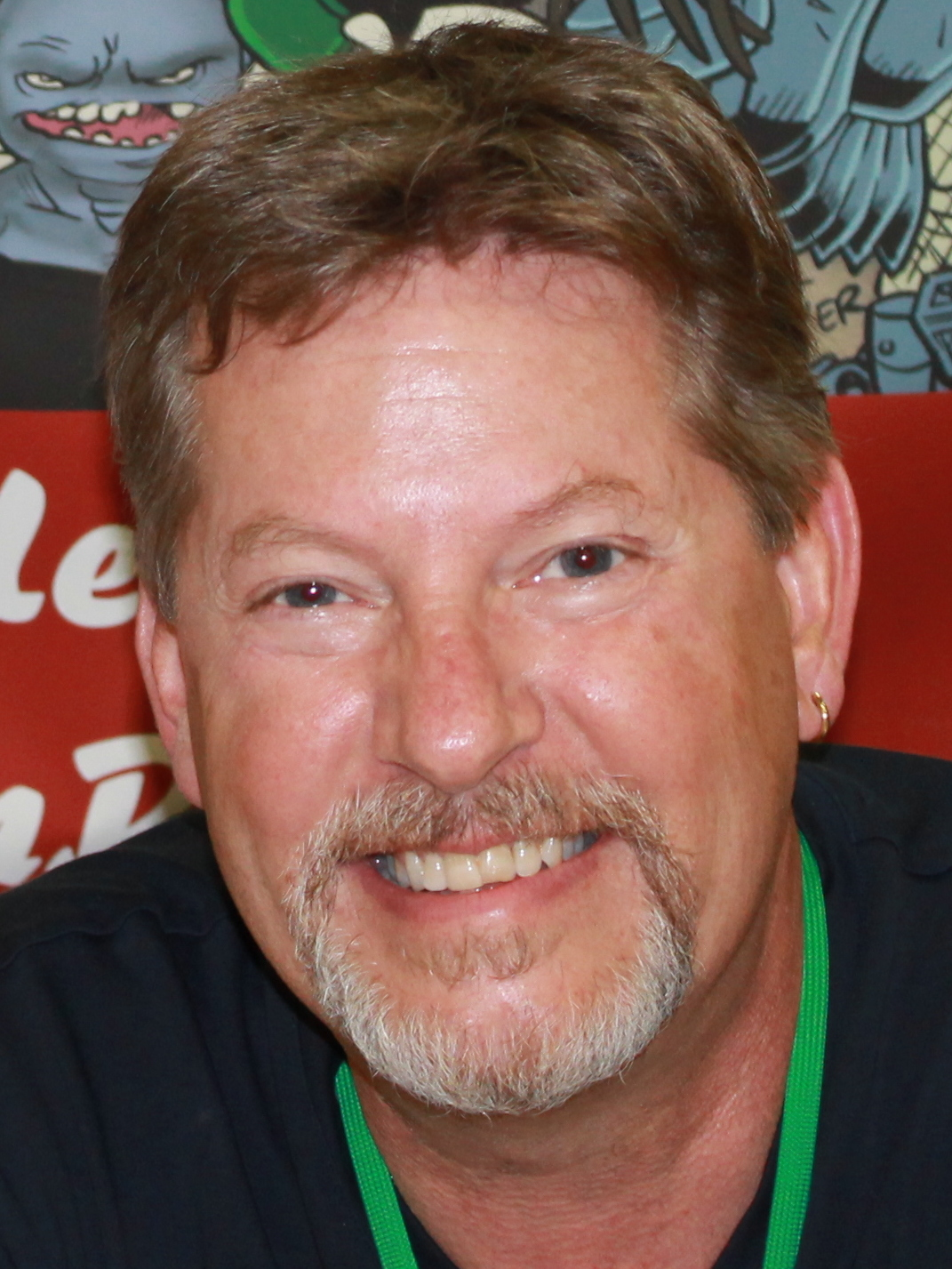
- Rayle at the Florida Supercon in 2013
- Born: January 3, 1955 (age 71); Fowler, Indiana, U.S.
- Education: Ball State University
- Occupation: Voice actor
- Years active: 1982–present
- Spouse: Maggie Roswell (m. 1987)
- Children: 1

Hal Rayle (born January 3, 1955) is an American voice actor. He has done many roles for both animated series and live action movies.

== Early life and education ==
Rayle was born on January 3, 1955 in Fowler, Indiana.

He graduated from Ball State University in 1977 with a degree in Telecommunications, Cinematography, and History.

== Career ==
Rayle has had a number of voice acting jobs over his career. Rayle's animated series roles include Miss Piggy, Gonzo and Animal for Little Muppet Monsters, Raphael in Teenage Mutant Ninja Turtles (filling in for Rob Paulsen), the Tin Man in The Wizard of Oz television series, Einstein the Dog and 65 other voices in Universal Animation's Back to the Future, Riddler's Henchman #1 in Batman: The Animated Series, Inspector Clouseau in The Pink Panther series, Reflex and Howler in Pound Puppies and the Legend of Big Paw, Lieutenant Commander Steele in SWAT Kats: The Radical Squadron, Pipes, Snarl and Shrapnel in Transformers, Deep Six in the Sunbow/Marvel G.I. Joe series, Arzon and the Wise Owl in Visionaries: Knights of the Magical Light, and Doyle Cleverlobe in Galaxy High.

Rayle also provided the voice of the Predator creature in Predator 2, and voiced Marvin the Martian in a commercial for Air Jordan.

In the live action film Ghoulies II, he was the voice for all of the Ghoulies. Rayle also voiced Virgil the Chimpanzee in Project-X, a koala bear in The Adventures of Ford Fairlane and some rats in Total Recall. Rayle has provided the voice of Alfred Hitchcock and the Hal-9000 Computer for Universal Studios Hollywood and Universal Orlando.

== Personal life ==
He is married to actress Maggie Roswell, and they adopted a girl in 1993, whom they named Spenser. They own and operate a voiceover studio, AudioRnR, near their home in Burbank, California.

== Partial filmography ==
- G.I. Joe: A Real American Hero - Deep Six
- The Transformers (1984) - Pipes, Snarl, Shrapnel
- The Ewok Adventure (1984) - Weechee (voice)
- Snorks (1985) - Additional Voices
- Star Worms II: Attack of the Pleasure Pods (1985) - Replacement (voice)
- Little Muppet Monsters (1985) - Miss Piggy, Gonzo, Animal
- Small Wonder (1985) - Parrot
- The A-Team (1985) - Chuck-a-Luck the Chicken
- Defenders of the Earth (1986) - Prince Kro-Tan (voice)
- The Transformers: The Movie (1986) - Shrapnel, Snarl (voice)
- Teenage Mutant Ninja Turtles (1987) - Raphael (European Side Season), Dr. Otto Von Shrink
- Bionic Six (1987) - Eric Bennett / Sport-1
- Pound Puppies and the Legend of Big Paw (1988) - Howler / Reflex (voice)
- Superman (1988) - Additional Voices
- Ghoulies II (1988) - Ghoulies (voice)
- Total Recall (1990) - Rats (voice, uncredited)
- Predator 2 (1990) - The Predator (voice, uncredited)
- The Wizard of Oz (1990) - Tin Man
- Toxic Crusaders (1991) - Bonehead, Dr. Bender
- Fievel's American Tails (1992) - Clint Mousewood
- The Pink Panther (1993) - Charlie Ant (occasional understudy; season two), Additional Voices
- SWAT Kats: The Radical Squadron (1993) - Lieutenant Commander Steele
- Camp California Where the Music Never Ends (1993)
- The High Crusade (1994) - Alien 1 (voice)
