= List of Bionic Six episodes =

The following is an episode list for the animated television series Bionic Six. The series ran for two seasons with a total of 65 episodes being aired. Bionic Six was produced by TMS Entertainment and distributed by MCA Television (since renamed NBCUniversal Syndication Studios).

== Episode list ==
=== Season 1 (Spring 1987) ===
No.	Title	Written by	Teleplay(s)	Original release date
1	"Valley of Shadows"	Gordon Bressack	TBA	19 April 1987
Explorer Brent Holworth returns from the Valley of Shadows, a hidden jungle valley where it is rumored its inhabitants never age. Holworth notifies Professor Sharp, but immediately afterward is captured by Scarab. The Bionic Six and Scarab's team both race to find the Valley of Shadows first.
2	"Enter the Bunji"	Larry Ditillio	Pat Ventura	19 April 1987
Scarab's goons gather information about Dragon's Rock, a remote island in the East China Sea. Each year, the greatest martial artists gather on Dragon's Rock to compete in the Grand Master's Tournament. Prof. Sharp sends Karate-1 undercover to discover Scarab's plans. Karate-1 also hopes to use the opportunity to find his missing father, who he thinks may be on Dragon's Rock.
3	"Eric Bats a Thousand"	Burt Wetanson	TBA	26 April 1987
Prof. Sharp informs the Bionic Six that a meteor is on a collision course with earth in New York City. I.Q. estimates the impact will explode with the force of a 10 megaton bomb. Meanwhile, Dr. Scarab has discovered that the meteor contains a large amount of Bertonium, an element that can help him achieve immortality. He sends Chopper, Glove, and Mechanic to retrieve the meteor.
4	"Klunk in Love"	Pamela Hickey and Dennys McCoy	TBA	26 April 1987
While on an underwater excursion, Mother-1 discovers a fissure to a hidden world, where all the aquatic creatures share a mental link. Mother-1's telepathy allows her to communicate with an octopus-like creature, convincing her to come with Mother-1 to our world. When Scarab sends Madame-O and Klunk to investigate this new fissure, Klunk falls in love with the mysterious octopus-creature.
5	"Radio Scarab"	Karen Willson and Chris Weber	TBA	3 May 1987
Dr. Scarab creates a radio station: Radio Scarab. Using the station as a cover, Scarab transmits a frequency that jams bionics. During family training, Scarab's signals interfere with Karate-1's bionics, causing him to accidentally injure a non-bionicized Meg Bennett.
6	"Family Affair"	Eric Lewald	TBA	3 May 1987
When Prof. Sharp learns of the death of his aunt Hilda Millicent Howell, he is invited via teleconference to listen to a video of her last will. Dr. Scarab is also invited to watch, and both Sharp and Scarab are asked by the now-deceased Aunt Hilda to become friends. Little does Sharp realize that Hilda's death is a trick by Scarab.
7	"Happy Birthday, Amadeus"	Burt Wetanson	Buzz Dixon	10 May 1987
The Bionic Six plan a surprise party for Prof. Sharp's birthday. Dr. Scarab has the same idea, and he and his goons break into Prof. Sharp's museum. Karate-1 decides to surprise Sharp by disguising himself as Dr. Scarab. Scarab discovers Karate-1's plan, and swaps himself with the disguised Karate-1.
8	"Brain Food"	Jack Enyad	Craig Miller and Mark Nelson	10 May 1987
Dr. Hugo Fish creates a food capable of increasing a creature's intelligence by tenfold. Dr. Fish decides to debut his creation at the Paris Food Conference. Unknown to Fish, Madame-O steals a sample of his Brain Food and gives it to Scarab. Scarab sends Glove and Madame-O to steal more, where they are intercepted by the Bionic Six.
9	"Just a Little Handicap"	Francis Moss	TBA	17 May 1987
Prof. Sharp and the Bionic Six appear at the Sheldrake Academy, where Sharp debuts his Anti-Gravity Glide Path Controller. In addition, Sharp designs various pieces of equipment for disabled children. One student, Ronnie Gordon, shows his bitterness to the team, and Scarab's group convinces him to turn on the Bionic Six. Ronnie lures I.Q. into a trap, and he is captured by Glove and Madame-O, who hold him hostage in exchange for the controller.
10	"Bionics On! The First Adventure"	Gerard Baldwin	Frances Novier	17 May 1987
Jack Bennett had taken his family on a skiing trip to the Himalayas. During this trip, Jack is called to duty to investigate unusual magnetic readings. He encounters aliens who are trying to obtain Burtonium, a mineral that can increase bionic abilities and give eternal life to its possessor. In a battle, Jack's family becomes trapped under radioactive snow and they slip into a coma. Not seeing another way to save their lives, Jack permits Professor Sharp to operate on his family. Professor Sharp implants bionics in human beings, and the Bionic Six are born. Doctor Scarab creates his own bionic group from "worthless examples of humanity."
11	"Back to the Past: Part 1"	Pamela Hickey and Dennys McCoy	TBA	24 May 1987
Prof. Sharp builds a Perpetual Chronographic Generator, a machine that will allow time travel. As Sharp prepares to send the Bennett family and Drs. Lund, Swift, and Johnson back in time to the Mesozoic Era, the group is attacked by Scarab's goons. Glove, Mechanic, and Madame-O trade places with the doctors, and sneak into the past with Mother-1, Sport-1, and I.Q.
12	"Back to the Past: Part 2"	Pamela Hickey and Dennys McCoy	TBA	24 May 1987
Due to Glove's interference, dinosaurs from the Mesozoic Era pour through Prof. Sharp's Perpetual Chronographic Generator in the Mojave Desert. While Bionic-1, Karate-1, and Rock-1 deal with the dinosaurs in the present, Mother-1, Sport-1, and I.Q. must deal with Scarab's goons in the past. With fights in two different time periods, Prof. Sharp must repair the time generator before it creates a permanent rift in the "time-flow continuum".
13	"Fugitive F.L.U.F.F.I."	Gordon Bressack	Pamela Hickey and Dennys McCoy	31 May 1987
Cycron the Great, a Voltron-like television show, is a favorite of both F.L.U.F.F.I. and the Mechanic. When the Mechanic realizes that Cycron is really an actor, Mechanic traps the actor and replaces him. Mechanic-Cycron tricks F.L.U.F.F.I. into doing his bidding, which includes stealing cute puppies and robbing banks.
14	"Nick of Time"	Paul Davids and Gordon Bressack	Michael Reaves	31 May 1987
When Scarab attacks a microwave receiving station, the Bionic Six arrive to stop him. However, Scarab's attack was just a ploy in order to capture Sport-1. Once captured, Scarab tricks Sport-1 into thinking he is 30 years in the future after suspended animation, and that Scarab is good while the Bionic Six are evil.
15	"Youth or Consequences"	Troy Schmidt and Jeff Holder	Pat Ventura	7 June 1987
After Rock-1, Sport-1, and I.Q. intercept Klunk in a Punjabi bazaar, Rock-1, as Meg Bennett, returns to attend the Socrates Hop at Albert Einstein High School. However, Meg's desire to go with Bim is thwarted when Bim asks Janet Sutton out first. Meg gets frustrated after being asked out by Furty Fosberry (a geeky freshman) and Dr. Oscar DeLeon (a fourteen-year-old scientist). However, Dr. DeLeon holds a secret ... one that Scarab desires.
16	"Extra Innings"	Jina Bacarr	Pat Ventura	7 June 1987
The Bennett family get tickets to the Old-Timers' Game at Yankee Stadium. Retired baseball player Homer Hernandez returns for the game after a disappearance of 30 years. However, it appears that Hernandez has not aged a day. This "eternally young" baseball player draws the attention of Dr. Scarab.
17	"Return of the Bunji"	Gordon Bressack	Pamela Hickey and Dennys McCoy	14 June 1987
Prof. Sharp receives a message from Momo Yashima, an ally of Karate-1's from Dragon's Rock. The Bionic Six travel to Momo's village in Japan, where they must protect the village from the threat of the Ancients, ghosts from the past. The Ancients are angered because someone unworthy has desecrated the Armor of Light in the Temple of the Lost Samurai.
18	"Crown of the Scarab King"	Burt Wetanson	TBA	14 June 1987
Professor Sharp and a team of archaeologists discover the ancient Scarab Scroll: a map to an ancient treasure. Bionic One turns over command of the team to the kids for 24 hours, and the kids must learn how to work together before Dr. Scarab gains control the Crown of the Scarab King.
19	"1001 Bionic Nights"	Lydia C. Marano and Arthur Byron Cover	Jeff Segal	21 June 1987
When all technology in the Middle Eastern nation Shariar dies, Professor Sharp sends the team to investigate. Once there, Mother-1 is kidnapped by A.L.A.D.D.I.N. (A Logistical Analytical Dream Drive with Improbability Neurons), a sentient reality-altering computer that requires the feeding of "more data".
20	"The Perceptor File"	Craig Miller and Mark Nelson	Kate Boutilier	21 June 1987
A strange man calling himself the "Perceptor" declares a one-man war on technology. His sabotage of Professor Sharp's newest aircraft brings him to the attention of Bionic-1. However, when the team discovers that the professor is covering for the vigilante, they realize there is more than meets the eye about the Perceptor.
21	"Masterpiece"	Larry Ditillio	Mark Edens	28 June 1987
Dr. Fish unveils his latest invention: the Fish Art Demolecularizer (or FAD). His device is able to absorb a masterpiece of art, then via a headset, instruct a person to recreate it. Chopper and Mechanic try to kidnap Dr. Fish, but are stopped by the Bionic Six. However, unknown to the Bionic Six, Dr. Fish was actually replaced by Glove during the hijack attempt.
22	"House Rules"	Jina Bacaar	Bob Jacques	28 June 1987
When Bionic-1 and Mother-1 leave for a vacation in Honolulu, the kids have the house to themselves. The kids try to keep their identities secret while throwing a house party, but that becomes much harder when Scarab and his goons crash the party.

=== Season 2 (Fall 1987) ===
No.	Title	Written by	Teleplay(s)	Original release date
1	"Holidaze"	Gordon Bressack, John Semper and Cynthia Friedlob	Francis Moss	8 September 1987
The Bennett family is off to Dr. Fish's new theme park Holiday World. However, their vacation ends when Scarab takes over Holiday World's central computer, sending the park's animatronic Bio-droids on a spree of destruction.
2	"Nightmare at Cypress Cove"	Gordon Bressack	Buzz Dixon	9 September 1987
Glove creates a device that can enter the dream world. Once there, he creates a weapons factory to create impossible weapons, which he then brings back to the waking world. Glove's dream merges with Bunji's nightmare, and with the help of the ghost of Bunji's father, Bunji guides the team to stop Glove.
3	"Music Power"	Jack Enyart, Gordon Bressack, Pamela Hickey and Dennys McCoy	Pamela Hickey and Dennys McCoy	10 September 1987
Professor Sharp's colleague Dr. Bruce "Bad Brains" Huxter creates robotic musicians he calls the Bandroids: guitarist Rivet Rick, keyboardist Techno Tex, bassist Metalhand, and drummer Bob. The Bionic Six serve as bodyguards to the Bandroids' charity concert. Scarab kidnaps Rock-1 and the Bandroids, intending to reprogram the band into his unwitting accomplices in his goal for eternal youth.
4	"The Hive"	Randy Lofficier	TBA	11 September 1987
Miners in the Kalahari Desert have been disappearing, so Sharp sends the Bionic Six to investigate. Edward Tulley, mine manager, brings them to the mine. The Bionic Six do not realize that Tulley is actually on Scarab's payroll. This time, however, the threat isn't from Scarab; it is from the new inhabitants of the mine: the Hive.
5	"Mindlink"	John Bradford, Pamela Hickey and Dennys McCoy	Craig Miller and Mark Nelson	14 September 1987
Prof. Sharp's colleague Dr. Halliwell Partridge is kidnapped by Chopper. Scarab has a new plan: kidnap four of the greatest analytical thinkers and connect them to Scarab's supercomputer. With three scientists in place, Scarab targets his fourth: Bionic Six member I.Q.
6	"I Compute, Therefore I Am"	Evelyn Gabai and Gordon Bressack	Pat Ventura	15 September 1987
After yet another defeat at the hands of the Bionic Six, Dr. Scarab decides to upgrade his Cyphrons. The new Beta Cyphrons are programmed to think for themselves, and are programmed with the tactics of the greatest military minds of history. Scarab sends the new Beta Cyphrons after the Bionic Six while he steals Sharp's new Ultra-Beam Laser. However, the Beta Cyphrons now have a mind of their own.
7	"Pass or Fail"	Buzz Dixon	John Welden	16 September 1987
After Prof. Sharp creates a Bio-Energy Replicator, he debuts this new invention. Meg Bennett and Bim attend the demonstration to interview Prof. Sharp for their science project. When Scarab, Glove, and Madame-O try to steal Prof. Sharp's device, Bim gets brave and tries to stop them. Scarab captures Bim and Meg, thinking that Bim may be a member of the Bionic Six.
8	"Born to Be Bad"	Jack Enyart and Gordon Bressack	Francis Moss	17 September 1987
At Albert Einstein High School, Charlie Wilder, a friend of J.D. Bennett, is awarded student of the year. However, his ceremony is interrupted by a gang called the Nukes. Charlie, who was once a Nuke, rejoins after his award is revoked. It is up to J.D. to stand up for his friend. When J.D. investigates, he finds out that Scarab is instigating a gang war between the Nukes and a rival gang, the Lasers.
9	"A Clean Slate: Part 1"	Gordon Bressack	Pamela Hickey and Dennys McCoy	18 September 1987
Prof. Sharp creates a Memory Enhancer, a device that can increase a person's memory by 75%, and demonstrates it for the government. However, Scarab creates a "Memory Enhancer Enhancer", which will increase the capabilities of Sharp's machine even further. The Bionic Six and Scarab clash over the Memory Enhancer, and Scarab uses it on himself, not knowing that Glove sabotaged it. Scarab's mind is wiped, and Sharp takes the opportunity to re-teach Scarab everything, hoping Scarab will end up on the side of good.
10	"A Clean Slate: Part 2"	Gordon Bressack	Pamela Hickey and Dennys McCoy	21 September 1987
With his mind wiped and his intelligence boosted, Wilmer Sharp (the former Dr. Scarab) comes to live in the Bennett household. The Bennett family and Prof. Sharp try to raise Wilmer on the side of good. Wilmer shows his true colors again, but becomes even more threatening when he discovers the secret identities of the Bionic Six. He then "takes over" his former gang and sets his sights on the Bionic Six.
11	"Spin Out"	Ted Perry	Pat Ventura	22 September 1987
A recent geologic alert has discovered an abundance of emeralds in nearby Mineral Flats. Professor Sharp sends the Bionic Six to investigate. The heroes encounter "Sparky", a restorer of antique planes. They agree to help Sparky raise money by putting on an antique air show. Scarab realizes that the antique aircraft Lulubelle, a B-25 bomber, was lost with a load of emeralds. Scarab's team sets out to steal the aircraft.
12	"The Man in the Moon"	Gerard Baldwin	Frances Novier	23 September 1987
Prof. Sharp has been tracking a Burtonium meteor that will impact near the Apennine Mountains on the Moon. Figuring that Scarab will also be interested in this meteor, Sharp enlists the aide of the United Space Center (Note: While the United Space Center is seen on all the signage to the facility, the voice actors reference it as the International Space Center. In this episode, as well as later episodes, the initials U.S.C. are also seen on various spacecraft.) to send the Bionic Six to the Moon. Scarab's team attacks the space center and hijacks the Bionic Six's rocket. Sharp sends the Bionic Six after Scarab in a rocket of his own design. Now the Bionic Six, Scarab's crew, and the aliens from the Bionic Six's origins are all after the Burtonium meteor.
13	"The Case of the Baker Street Bionics"	John Semper	Ian Freedman	24 September 1987
The Bionic Six are nominated as Crime Solvers of the Year by the Crime Solvers Society. However, the nomination is objected by Irene Hughes, citing that the Bionic Six solve crimes with brawn rather than brains. She challenges the Bionic Six to a competition sponsored by her uncle Mycroft Hughes (a billionaire scientist and fan of Sherlock Holmes). Karate-1 and I.Q. accept, but Scarab and Madame-O crash the party.
14	"Now You See Me..."	Stef Donev and Mary Kaiser Donev	TBA	25 September 1987
When Bunji tries a new meditation technique to gain invisibility, the rest of the Bennett kids trick him into thinking it worked. Unfortunately, their trick backfires when a non-invisible Bunji tries to take on Scarab's goons single-handedly. When Karate-1 gets captured, the Bionic Six and the ghost of Bunji's father come to his aid.
15	"Crystal Clear"	Stef Donev and Mary Kaiser Donev	Craig Miller and Mark Nelson	28 September 1987
After the Bionic Six responds to an avalanche at the High Mountain Ski Resort in Colorado, the team relaxes by visiting a carnival. Once there, Mother-1 visits a fortune teller, who gives her a mysterious prophecy. When the fortune teller's prophecy foretells the truth, and Mother-1's ESP fails, the team is thrown into disarray. Unbeknownst to the team, Scarab and Madame-O are behind Mother-1's ESP failure.
16	"You've Come a Long Way, Baby!"	Jina Bacaar	Pat Ventura	29 September 1987
The Bennett family awakens to find a baby on their doorstep, delivered there overnight by two energy beings. Scarab, discovering the night before an interdimensional doorway opened, travels to Cypress Cove to investigate. Meanwhile, the Bennett's new baby is draining light, electrical energy, and bionic energy from all around him.
17	"Up and Atom"	Gordon Bressack, Lydia C. Marano and Arthur Byron Cover	Lydia C. Marano and Arthur Byron Cover	30 September 1987
During a battle against Madame-O and Klunk, Rock-1 becomes distracted by a voice in her head calling for help from the Bionic Six. Prof. Sharp discovers the source of the sound: a distress call from a sub-atomic anti-matter world. Rock-1, Sport-1, and I.Q. are transported to a sub-atomic ship by Captain Stereopolis. The captain's world is being destroyed by Scarab's current experiment. The Bionic Six must stop Scarab's anti-matter experiment.
18	"Home Movies"	Craig Miller and Mark Nelson	TBA	1 October 1987
Bunji has taken up a new hobby: 3D Laser Holo-Filmmaking. One of his first projects becomes a film documenting the life of the Bennett family. Unfortunately, Bunji's camera accidentally captures the Bennett family transforming into the Bionic Six. A mix-up has Mechanic getting a hold of the disc with the Bennett family's secret identities. Karate-1 and the rest of the Bionic Six must now track down Mechanic and the missing disc.
19	"Scarabscam"	John Welden	TBA	2 October 1987
The Bennett kids and Prof. Sharp meet up with Hokey McCoy, an old time con artist and friend of Prof. Sharp. Afterwards, the Bionic Six are sent to investigate the emergence of a strange green tar that has erupted from a mining site. Scarab also shows an interest in the tar (and the possible Burtonium underneath), and assaults the mining site. Scarab captures the tar pit, and sets up an anti-bionic field. Sharp calls upon Hokey's skills to con Scarab into giving up the site.
20	"Kaleidoscope"	Gordon Bressack, Pamela Hickey and Dennys McCoy	Pamela Hickey and Dennys McCoy	5 October 1987
Prof. Sharp's computer intercepts a signal from Scarab's computer with the mysterious message "Reactivate Project Mars". 20 years ago, when Dr. Scarab first embarked on a life of crime, he partnered with a master of disguise named Kaleidoscope. Their last caper, Project Mars, was left unfinished. Now, the Bionic Six must contact Kaleidoscope in jail to discover the truth about Project Mars.
21	"Once Upon a Crime"	Pamela Hickey and Dennys McCoy	TBA	6 October 1987
As King Jonathan ascends to the throne of the fictional nation of Fredonia, he is transformed into a giant frog. A second Jonathan arrives, claiming the first to be a demon trying to take the throne. The whole scheme was orchestrated by Scarab in order to close Fredonia's border and use Fredonia's export of unique microcircuits. The Bionic Six are sent to investigate.
22	"Mrs. Scarab"	Jim MacGeorge and Frank Ridgeway	Stef Donev and Mary Kaiser Donev	7 October 1987
When Dr. Scarab gets lonely, he decides to create the perfect mate. Using his computer, Scarab realizes that his ideal mate would look like Mother-1. Scarab plans an ambush, and kidnaps Mother-1. However, his plan to create a mate is sabotaged by Madame-O, and the result is an identical female version of Scarab.
23	"The Secret Life of Wellington Forsby"	Francis Moss and Gordon Bressack	TBA	8 October 1987
Scarab and his goons break into Dynatech Industries late one night to steal a Sonic Multiplexer. The Bionic Six arrive on the scene, as does a new "hero" named Captain Confusion. Captain Confusion is actually Wellington Forsby, the smartest and most socially inept student at Albert Einstein High School. Forsby's plan is to capture Scarab to make his mark on the world, and continues to adopt superhero guises to take on Scarab, much to the chagrin of the Bionic Six.
24	"The Fungus Among Us"	Gordon Bressack	Craig Miller and Mark Nelson	9 October 1987
Dr. Fish returns, this time with a gun capable of rapidly accelerating the growth of fungi. Dr. Fish coincidentally tests his device on the abandoned offshore oil rig directly above Dr. Scarab's hidden lair. Scarab kidnaps Fish, takes his Fungus Accelerator, and abandons him on a remote island. Scarab causes havoc around the globe with his new weapon, and the Bionic Six must stop him.
25	"Bottom of the Ninth Planet"	Gordon Bressack	Marc Scott Zicree	12 October 1987
Artificial objects resembling "easter eggs" are hurtling towards Earth from outer space, targeting Undertown, Arizona and Mt. Vesuvius. The Bionic Six must split up to intercept both "eggs". The Bionic Six are teleported to Pluto, where a bunch of aliens are playing a game of solar system golf. The Bionic Six are challenged to a bunch of games, including an alien version of baseball.
26	"Triple Cross"	Rick Holicker, Heidi J. Holicker and Gordon Bressack	TBA	13 October 1987
Prof. Sharp debuts his newest invention, a Time Extraction Device (or TED) on the television show Good Morning Hemisphere. The device allows Sharp to pull past or future versions of objects into the present. Glove, disguised as one of the hosts of the show, steals TED. Dr. Scarab uses the TED on himself, bringing a younger and an older version of himself into the present. However, each version of Scarab has their own plans.
27	"I, Scarab: Part 1"	Gordon Bressack, Pamela Hickey and Dennys McCoy	Pamela Hickey and Dennys McCoy	14 October 1987
Dr. Scarab and his team break into Brianobian Laser Core Generating Plant to set up his Modifier. Though the Bionic Six arrive on the scene, they are too late to prevent Scarab's Modifier from activating, covering the entire Earth in an energy wave. As additional security arrives on the scene, the Bionic Six are shocked to find that the security team work for Scarab. The Bionic Six escape, unaware that General Brillig and the rest of the world are also under Scarab's rule. The Bionic Six are captured, and it appears Scarab has finally won. However, Prof. Sharp, with the aide of F.L.U.F.F.I., seek out the few in the world unaffected by Scarab's Modifier: other bionic and android heroes and villains.
28	"I, Scarab: Part 2"	Gordon Bressack, Pamela Hickey and Dennys McCoy	Pamela Hickey and Dennys McCoy	15 October 1987
In two days time, the effect of scarab's Modifier will become permanent, and everybody in the world will worship him. Prof. Sharp sends his new Bionic Six (Perceptor, Kaleidoscope, and the Bandroids) after the original Bionic Six, whom Scarab has captured and is holding in facilities around he world. Kaleidoscope frees Bionic-1, Perceptor frees Mother-1, and the Bandroids free the kids. The Bionic Six now becomes the Bionic Twelve, and, with Prof. Sharp's coordination, the team must assault Scarab's Palace (formerly the White House) and reverse the Modifier's effects.
29	"Scabracadabra"	Craig Miller and Mark Nelson	TBA	16 October 1987
Sharp introduces the Bionic Six to his old friend, Nicholas Nicholby, the world's foremost illusionist. Sharp arranges the Bionic Six to be Nicholby's guards and expert witnesses for his next performance. Scarab, thinking that Nicholby's abilities are the result of real magic, kidnaps Nicholby and holds him hostage in Nicholby's workshop. Nicholby's wand leads the Bionic Six to Nicholby's workshop, where they must free the magician.
30	"The Glitch"	Kathy Selbert	TBA	19 October 1987
Prof. Sharp creates a Parallel Dimensional Viewer (or PDV), where he can view other parallel dimensions. However, Sharp is unable to view human-inhabited parallel worlds due to a "glitch" in the system. J.D. offers to help fix the glitch, and when he does so, he accidentally allows a creature from a parallel world to cross over. J.D. names this foot-tall, bright, orange, furry little creature "Glitch" and brings him home. Glitch causes chaos for both the Bionic Six and Scarab's goons, until Madame-O captures him. Now the Bionic Six must rescue Glitch.
31	"A Matter of Gravity"	Francis Moss	Pat Ventura	20 October 1987
The Bionic Six are taking an underwater tour of the Marianas Trench, scouting a test location for Prof. Sharp's new invention the Gravitron. On the tour, they meet up with their disabled friend Ronnie Gordon. While I.Q. is visiting Ronnie and his family, Scarab makes an attempt to steal the Gravitron. Scarab kidnaps Prof. Sharp and Ronnie's father, and the Bionic Six must rescue them. However, an impatient Ronnie tries to rescue his father on his own.
32	"The Elemental"	Pamela Hickey and Dennys McCoy	TBA	21 October 1987
Scarab sends his goons below ground in Arizona to mine for Burtonium. Getting stir crazy, Glove convinces the rest of the goons to head above ground to rob some of the locals. Glove's actions alert the Bionic Six, who recruit local Navajo Wayne Earthbody to help them find Scarab's goons. Wayne Earthbody is an "Elemental", someone who has the ability to manipulate the elements.
33	"I Am the Viper"	Gordon Bressack and Gerard Baldwin	Craig Miller and Mark Nelson	22 October 1987
An experimental radar-defeating automated stealth plane prototype named Viper has crashed landed on a remote island in the south Pacific. Viper's AI programming is severely damaged, making it attack the Bionic Six. Meanwhile, Dr. Scarab has created a Molding Ray, a gun capable of merging more than one being into one. Scarab hunts down the Bionic Six on that same remote island, where, instead of hitting the Bionic Six, he hits the experimental plane. The plane merges with a snake, and becomes a new metallic snake-like entity set to destroy the Bionic Six.
34	"Shadow Boxer"	John Welden and Gordon Bressack	John Welden	23 October 1987
A crooked boxer named Joe Kapula tries to get a cut of money from the dive he just took. As Joe fights the mob, the Bionic kids jump into the fight. The members of the mob fighting Joe, however, reveal themselves to be Glove, Madame-O, and Mechanic. Scarab's goons escape with the money, and take Joe with them. Offering him a position on the team, Scarab transforms Joe into the Shadow Boxer.
35	"Call of the Bunji"	Stef Donev and Mary Kaiser Donev	TBA	2 November 1987
On Bunji's birthday, the Bennett family throw him a surprise party. One of his presents is delivered by a hologram of his father. The hologram instructs Bunji that he is ready for the next step in his path to enlightenment, and that he must travel alone to visit the Temple of the Masters in the Himalayas. His test is to become one with the Ruby Obelisk, a source of powerful psionic power, however, he must ignore the temptation the obelisk offers.
36	"A Super Bunch of Guys"	Craig Miller and Mark Nelson	TBA	3 November 1987
Prof. Sharp has transformed his Parallel Dimensional Viewer (PDV) into a Parallel Dimensional Portal (PDP). The Bionic Six must deliver the PDP microchip to Dr. Mabusa at the Science Research Council. Glove steals the PDP chip from Mabusa, and gives it to Dr. Scarab. Scarab and his goons think they head to Dimension 410 (a dimension where everyone is a super-villain), but due to a bungle by Mechanic, they end up in Dimension 411 (a world where everyone is a super-hero).
37	"The Monkey Has Landed"	Gordon Bressack	TBA	4 November 1987
An unknown spacecraft from outside the Solar System is heading towards Earth. Prof. Sharp sends the Bionic Six to make contact the ship before it lands. Both the Bionic Six and the United Air Patrol fail, and the spacecraft lands in front of the U.N. building, revealing its inhabitant: a sentient, English-speaking monkey. The monkey was sent by the Intergalactic Congress to review Earth for entry. However, Scarab has other plans.
38	"Ready, Aim, Fired"	Craig Miller and Mark Nelson	TBA	5 November 1987
The Bionic Six is reviewed by Q10, a government agency responsible for reviewing all of Prof. Sharp's government-funded projects. However, the Q10 committee find the Bionic Six's responses lacking, since the team is willing to sacrifice the test's final goal to save Sport-1's life. After a live review in a battle against Scarab's goons, Mr. Noodnick exercises his ability to "fire" Prof. Sharp as leader of the Bionic Six.
39	"Love Note"	Gordon Bressack	Pamela Hickey and Dennys McCoy	6 November 1987
Famed underwater archaeologist Jonathan Dryden discovers the lost city of Melodius off the coast of Greece. Scarab's goons infiltrate Dryden's team, and steal the treasures of Melodius, including an ancient harp. Madame-O uses the harp on Scarab, which causes him to fall in love with her. Madame-O extends her control to the entire city, Prof. Sharp, the Bionic Six, and the entire world. Only Rock-1 is unaffected, and must take on the world alone.
40	"Bone of Contention"	Randy Lofficier	TBA	9 November 1987
Dr. Scarab steals the Omega Amplifier, a hand-held machine capable of controlling electricity. However, Scarab's latest plan is delayed when a stray dog taken in by Mechanic runs away with the Omega Amplifier. The dog finds its way to the Bennett household, where they adopt him, not knowing that he is being tracked by Scarab and his goons.
41	"Junk Heap"	Marc Scott Zicree	TBA	10 November 1987
When Mechanic drops off a load of toxic waste in a junkyard, he accidentally creates a sentient junk heap creature. This creature, called "Junk Heap", can absorb other forms of matter and energy into itself. Junk Heap attacks Scarab's base, but Scarab turns Junk Heap against the rest of the world.
42	"The Return of Mrs. Scarab"	Gordon Bressack	TBA	11 November 1987
Scarab has developed a way to move his team's brains into new, indestructible bodies. Scarab's goons head to Polymorph Plastics to get the last component he needs to complete the new bodies. However, before Dr. Scarab can begin, Scarabina (aka Mrs. Scarab) returns and tries to take over the gang. When she fails, she uses Scarab's bodies to create her own gang.
43	"That's All, Folks!"	Gordon Bressack	Pat Ventura	12 November 1987
J.D. and Bunji attend the retirement party for the greatest cartoonist in the world, Flub Fleming (a possible homage to Friz Freleng). Fleming dramatically announces that he is not retiring, but rather was forced out. He then steps through a wormhole into another dimension. Both Prof. Sharp and Scarab discover another wormhole at Flub Fleming's home, and both sides go to investigate. Karate-1, Rock-1, I.Q., Scarab, Mechanic, and Klunk are sucked through the wormhole into a world of cartoons.
