= Copperhead (G.I. Joe) =

Character in G.I. Joe

- G.I. Joe character
- Copperhead as seen in the Sunbow/Marvel G.I. Joe cartoon.
- First appearance: 1984
- Voiced by: Frank Welker (Sunbow/Marvel); Maurice LaMarche (DiC)

In-universe information
- Affiliation: Cobra
- Specialty: Water Moccasin Pilot
- File name: Classified
- Birth place: Unknown
- Primary MOS: Air-driver swamp vehicle operator
- Secondary MOS: Seaborne demolitions

Copperhead is a fictional character from the G.I. Joe: A Real American Hero toyline, comic books and animated series. He is Cobra's Water Moccasin pilot and debuted in 1984.

== Profile ==
Copperhead's military specialty is air-driver swamp vehicle operator. He is believed to be a native of the Florida Everglades, due to his immeasurable knowledge of the area, and is believed to have participated in high-stakes speedboat races in locales including Monaco and Japan. He is a frequent gambler and apparently began by betting on races he was participating in, increasing his problems by working for Cobra to pay off his debts.

Copperhead is extremely comfortable and capable in swamp environments, and is intimately familiar with seaborne demolitions and high-speed naval assault vehicles. He is also a gifted mechanic, spending much of his time elbow-deep in the transmissions of various Cobra watercraft, customizing and tuning them for maximum performance in jungle and swamp operations. Once Copperhead's combat and piloting skills were established, it is assumed that Cobra either paid off - or otherwise eliminated - his bookies.

During the time that Cobra was out of commission, Copperhead returned to his old tricks, and racked up more substantial debt. According to intelligence reports, he'd been placing wagers under false identities, then sabotaging his opponents, assuring himself of a guaranteed payday. Angry bookies came looking for retribution after his schemes were uncovered, and so Copperhead was relieved when he received the call back to Cobra, this time as the head of Cobra's Naval forces.

=== Phoenix Guard ===
The members of the Phoenix Guard were Cobra agents in disguise, but for Cobra Commander's elaborate ruse to succeed, each member of the team needed doctored military records and manufactured personal histories. Copperhead's fabricated identity was High Tide, real name Edward T. Johnson, born in New York City. High Tide's specialties were Navy S.E.A.L., underwater demolition and nautical operations. He attended U.S. Navy Boot Camp at the Naval Station in Great Lakes, Illinois. He also completed basic underwater demolition and S.E.A.L. training at the U.S. Naval Special Warfare Center in Coronado, California, and attended U.S. Army Airborne School at Fort Benning. He became known to General Rey for his cruel sense of humor.

== Toys ==
Copperhead was first released as an action figure in 1984, packaged with the "Water Moccasin" swamp cruiser. The early versions of Copperhead came with dark green paint on the helmet, gloves and armbands, while later versions had light green paint. In 1989, the same figure was available by mail-order from Hasbro, as part of a six figure vehicle drivers set that included H.I.S.S. Driver, Stinger Driver, Crankcase, Frostbite, and Thunder. The figure was also repainted and released as part of the Python Patrol line in 1989.

== Comics ==
=== Marvel Comics ===
Copperhead has actually never appeared in any issue of the Marvel Comics G.I. Joe series, although the Water Moccasin, sans Copperhead, was used in a running battle with G.I. Joe forces. It was crewed by the Cobra agents Wild Weasel and Firefly. However, Copperhead appeared in Marvel Comics G.I. Joe Yearbook #1 (March 1985) in the Cobra profiles and also in The G.I. Joe Order of Battle #3 (February 1987).

=== Action Force ===
Copperhead is also part of the "Action Force" continuity. With a Crimson Guardsman in the gunner position and a police officer hostage strapped in, he pursues Shipwreck down the Thames River. The two Cobra soldiers escape, but the hostage is safely rescued.

=== Devil's Due comics ===
Copperhead appears in the Devil's Due G.I. Joe series, providing nautical security for Cobra Island. The Joe rookie Barrel Roll is successfully inserted and extracted despite his best efforts. During the escape, Copperhead is almost killed when the Joe forces drop their escape craft on his vehicle.

In the America's Elite series, Copperhead is one of the Cobra operatives who pose as a new elite unit called Phoenix Guard. Copperhead is given the new codename "High Tide". Cobra Commander disguises himself as White House staff member Garret Freedlowe, and tricks General Rey into leading High Tide and his fellow Phoenix Guard against the Joes. Once the deception is revealed, Copperhead is captured by the Joes and imprisoned in The Coffin prison facility in Greenland. He is freed alongside several others, during an assault on The Coffin led by Tomax. Copperhead later teams with Ghost Bear, and battles Torpedo and Wet-Suit in the waters along the East African coast.

=== IDW ===
In IDW's G.I. Joe comic universe, Copperhead was given the name James McCoy and presented as a high ranking agent of Cobra in charge of their navy operations in the Gulf of Mexico. He is a single father and is not shown in costume. IDW's Copperhead was killed by G.I. Joe when the team raided his home, after Crimson Twin Tomax (who had defected from Cobra to work for G.I. Joe) gave up his location in hopes that by arresting him, they could then turn him informant.

Copperhead was killed in front of his son teenage son Scotty, who then angrily refutes Flint's attempt to get him to give up any information that he might have on his father's employer. Later, Scotty is seen being recruited by Baroness at his father's funeral, with it implied that he will assume his father's alter ego within Cobra.

== Animated series ==
=== Sunbow ===
In the Sunbow G.I. Joe cartoon, he first appeared in the first-season episode "Jungle Trap", voiced by Frank Welker. His last appearance is at the beginning of the episode "Worlds Without End Pt. 1".

=== DiC ===
Copperhead also appeared in DiC's G.I. Joe cartoon, voiced by Maurice LaMarche. In the "Operation Dragonfire" mini-series, Copperhead sides with Cobra Commander, and becomes a commander for the Python Patrol. The character does not wear his Python Patrol costume though; the character's helmet is also redesigned to be a closed face mask as opposed to allowing his eyes to be seen.

During an aerial chase with Serpentor, Copperhead is swayed to Serpentor's side, only for his plane to be blown up by Crimson Guardsman Scoop. It is unknown if he survived.

=== Valor vs. Venom ===
In G.I. Joe: Valor vs. Venom, Copperhead is a Cobra fighter pilot whose plane is downed by Kamakura.
