= Clash of the Guards =

British comic book story

- The cover to the 2023 Rebellion Developments collected edition of "Clash of the Guards", art by Cam Kennedy.
- Publisher: IPC Magazines
- Publication date: 26 September 1981 – 23 April 1983
- Genre: War
- Title(s): Battle; 26 September 1981 to 30 October 1982; 8 January to 23 April 1983
- Main character(s): Brad Clash

Creative team
- Writer(s): Alan Hebden
- Artist(s): Cam Kennedy; Ron Tiner
- Editor(s): Terry Magee
- Clash of the Guards: ISBN 9781781086216

"Clash of the Guards" is a British comic war story published in the weekly anthology Battle from 26 September 1981 to 23 April 1983 by IPC Magazines. Set during World War II, it follows the experiences of Brad Clash, a fictional American stuntman turned 6th Corps soldier assigned to pick up tips from a company of British Guards in Italy.

== Creation ==
The story was written by Battle Picture Weekly stalwart Alan Hebden, who had worked on other strips for the comic featuring American protagonists such as "Fighting Mann" and "Crazy Keller". The former had seen him paired with former Commando artist Cam Kennedy, who had started work on the title in 1979 - reactivating his comics career after six years working as a painter in France. Kennedy would later recall working on "Clash of the Guards" fondly, stating "I remember his Steve McQueen scowl and the shotgun - that was a lot of fun".

== Publishing history ==
The strip was popular with Battle readers, and after initially ending in October 1982 returned for a second four-month stint in 1983, with art from Vanyo and Norma.

Since 2016, the rights to the story have been owned by Rebellion Developments. In 2023 the first batch of episodes, from Battle 26 September 1981 to 20 February 1982, were collected by Rebellion Developments in July 2023 under their Treasury of British Comics label.

== Plot summary ==
Captain Brad Clash uses his experience as a Hollywood stuntman to confound foes as the American 6th Corps moves through Italy in 1943 towards the Gustav Line. As such he is selected to join an exchange programme and attached to a unit of British Guards to observe their tactics. Initially he has little respect for unit commander Lieutenant Stanton Carlyle, but soon finds out the Limeys know a thing or two about fighting. He is also able to show that his courageous all-action style of fighting has its own advantages, as does his Winchester pump action shotgun.

== Collected editions ==
| Title | ISBN | Publisher | Release date | Contents |
|---|---|---|---|---|
| Clash of the Guards | 9781781086216 | Rebellion Developments | 26 July 2023 | Material from Battle 26 September 1981 to 20 February 1982 |
