= Tripwire (G.I. Joe) =

Character from the G.I. Joe franchise

- G.I. Joe character
- Tripwire as seen in the Sunbow/Marvel G.I. Joe cartoon.
- First appearance: G.I. Joe: A Real American Hero issue #16 (October 1983)
- Voiced by: Rob Paulsen (Sunbow/Marvel); Andrew Kishino (Renegades)

In-universe information
- Affiliation: G.I. Joe
- Specialty: Mine Detector
- File name: Skoog, Tormod S.
- Birth place: Hibbing, Minnesota
- SN: RA892399255 (1983); 089-32-9227 (1988); 892-39-TS92(2008)
- Rank: E-4 (Specialist)
- Primary MOS: Explosive Ordnance Disposal
- Secondary MOS: Demolitions (1983); Tiger Fly Co-Pilot (1988 Only)
- Subgroups: Tiger Force

Tripwire is a fictional character from the G.I. Joe: A Real American Hero toyline, comic books and animated series. He is the G.I. Joe Team's Mine Detector, and debuted in 1983.

== Profile ==
His real name is Tormod S. Skoog, and his rank is that of specialist E-4. Like Bazooka, Tripwire was born in Hibbing, Minnesota. His primary military specialty is explosive ordnance disposal (EOD) and his secondary military specialty is demolitions.

Because his father was a career naval officer, Tripwire went to a high school on a naval base in Yokosuka, Japan. However, he dropped out to spend two years in a zen monastery, pondering the meaning of life. He was expelled for breaking too many dishes and spilling every conceivable liquid. Tripwire joined the army at age 19, and claims to have received spiritual awakening on the grenade range. He is proficient with all NATO and Warsaw Pact explosives, detonators, ignition initiators and blasting machines. He is a qualified expert with the M1911A1 Auto Pistol.

== Toy history ==
Tripwire was first released as an action figure in 1983. Overall, he has had 6 releases, using a total of 2 unique molds. His basic appearance has remained the same for each of his releases. He has had the same basic uniform for all of his variations, painted in different colors. He has had a green/grey uniform (1983, 2001, and 2008), a red/orange (1985, packaged with a "Listen n Fun" audio tape), and a brown/yellow/black Tiger Force style (1988). His 2001 issue is a double pack with the G.I. Joe member 'Big Brawler'. All versions include a mine detector/metal detector and several mines.

His file card states that he "freaks people out. He's always clumsy, jittery, and dropping things except when he's working with high explosives. Explosives are the only things that calm him down". This source of humor is played up in the comics (see below).

== Comics ==
=== Marvel Comics ===
Tripwire first appeared in the Marvel Comics G.I. Joe: A Real American Hero #16 (October 1983). There, he saves the U.S. Treasury from a bomb planted by Doctor Venom.

Tripwire, Mutt and Torpedo are assigned to investigate Cobra activity in the Florida Everglades. They encounter most of the Cobra high command and temporarily capture Firefly and Wild Weasel.

In issue 28, Tripwire attempts to save the lives of other Joes by throwing himself on top of a makeshift bomb. Roadblock safely disposes of the bomb and lectures Tripwire on unneeded heroism.

Tripwire is one of the Joes assigned to test out the new, mobile battle platform. It comes under heavy attack by Cobra forces. After that threat is defeated, all available Joes take part in an aborted raid on the newly formed Cobra Island.

Tripwire, like all active Joes, takes part in the invasion of Springfield. Later, he saves a Joe assault team by defusing bombs moments before Tomax and Xamot would have set them off.

Tripwire is used as a source of comic relief, playing-off the juxtaposition of his extreme clumsiness and his role as the Joe team's EOD expert. For example, in issue 16 Tripwire trips over his metal detector while carrying a backpack full of mines; in issue 22 he falls over while carrying a tall stack of dishes; and in issue 25 he falls off the Dragonfly's skids during an airborne insertion.

=== Devil's Due ===
Like many Joes, Tripwire makes the move to Devil's Due publishing when they gained the G.I. Joe license. He is there to take control of a nuclear bomb stolen from Cobra forces, or so the Joes believe. As is typical for his appearance in comics, he trips right after warmly greeting Clutch. Upon taking the device from Deep Six, he pretends to drop it as a joke.

In the 2003 Frontline miniseries, Tripwire works with Flash, Beach Head and Airtight to prevent a militia led by Tyler Wingfield from launching a bioterrorist attack, but they wind up coming into conflict with Joe undercover specialist Chuckles, who had come in contact with the group while posing as a Cobra agent. When all four parachute from a Tomahawk down to the rendezvous point in Colorado, Tripwire trips on his own feet on his way out. He is later seen as a member of one of many Joe squads fighting Cobra across the world.

== Animated series ==
=== Sunbow ===
Tripwire appeared in the original G.I. Joe animated series. He debuted in the miniseries "The M.A.S.S. Device". He appeared in his first uniform appeared throughout the first season, and was absent in the second season. He was voiced by Rob Paulsen.

=== G.I. Joe: The Movie ===
Tripwire is shown in a few scenes of the 1987 animated film G.I. Joe: The Movie, but like many of the characters of the Sunbow cartoon, he has a very minor role. He observes the trial of Lt. Falcon and is later seen retreating from Cobra-La before it explodes.

=== G.I. Joe: Renegades ===
Tripwire as Private Skoog appears in the G.I. Joe: Renegades episode "Homecoming" Pt. 2 voiced by Andrew Kishino. In a flashback, Skoog steps on a land mine and is eventually rescued by Duke who pushes him off the landmine taking the brunt of the explosion.
