= Deep Six (G.I. Joe) =

G.I. Joe character

- G.I. Joe character
- Illustration of Deep Six from G.I. Joe: Order of Battle. Art by Herb Trimpe.
- First appearance: G.I. Joe: A Real American Hero issue #25 (July 1984)
- Voiced by: Hal Rayle (Sunbow/Marvel)

In-universe information
- Affiliation: G.I. Joe
- Specialty: S.H.A.R.C. driver
- File name: Willoughby, Malcolm R.
- Birth place: Baltimore, Maryland
- SN: RA226960917
- Rank: E-5 (petty officer 2nd class) (1985); E-7 (chief petty officer) (1989)
- Primary MOS: Diver
- Secondary MOS: Small craft pilot
- Subgroups: Eco-Warriors

Deep Six is a fictional character from the G.I. Joe: A Real American Hero toyline, comic books and animated series. He is the G.I. Joe Team's S.H.A.R.C. driver and debuted in 1984.

== Profile ==
His real name is Malcolm R. Willoughby, and his rank is that of Navy petty officer 2nd class (Master Diver's rating). Deep Six was born in Baltimore, Maryland.

Deep Six's primary military specialty is diver and his secondary military specialty is small craft pilot/motorized. He likes to be alone, preferably down in the ocean depths. He was one of the 12 out of 50 applicants who passed the strict requirements to become the G.I. Joe Team diver; eight more did not make it out of the practical application testing, and Deep Six was able to hold his breath the longest out of the four remaining finalists.

== Toys ==
Deep Six was first released as an action figure in 1984, depicted in an atmospheric diving suit and packaged with the S.H.A.R.C. vehicle. A new version of Deep Six was released in 1989, which was more mobile and poseable than his original figure. That version was recolored and released as a mail-away exclusive in 1993. A new version of Deep Six was also released as part of the Eco-Warriors line in 1992, which came with a pet dolphin named "Finback".

A version of Deep Six was released in 2009 as part of the "Rise of Cobra" line, despite not appearing in the film of the same name.

== Comics ==
=== Marvel Comics ===
In the Marvel Comics G.I. Joe series, he first appeared in G.I. Joe: A Real American Hero #25 (July 1984). Several fellow Joes note how Deep Six keeps to himself. Deep-Six then battles Firefly and Wild Weasel in the Florida Everglades in defense of other Joes.

He next appears in G.I. Joe: A Real American Hero #33 (March 1985) when he is assigned to help decorate for an upcoming party. He escapes any actual work when a coincidence allows other Joes to bring back a party van filled with balloons.

Deep-Six is injured as part of a Joe battle against Cobra forces in the Gulf of Mexico.

=== Devil's Due ===
He appears in issue #8 of the Devil's Due series, also called G.I. Joe: A Real American Hero. In it, he transfers possession of a 'nuclear bomb' (the Joes do not yet know it was all a ruse) to the explosives expert Tripwire. He later takes part in the battle against the forces of Cobra and the Coil. Deep-Six is later seen battling Cobra operatives off the coast of Algeria.

=== IDW Comics ===
Deep Six is trapped in rising waters when Storm Shadow rampages through the USS Flagg. To save others from risking their lives, Deep Six accepts Snake Eyes taking his arm. He escapes the destruction of the Flagg.

== Animated series ==
=== Sunbow ===
Deep Six appeared in the original G.I. Joe animated series. He is portrayed as a recluse. He first appeared in the animated series in the first-season episode "Cobra Stops the World". He was voiced by Hal Rayle.

Deep Six appeared in two public service announcements. The first one dealt with him saving a kid from drowning while explaining the dangers of not wearing a life jacket. The second one dealt with him telling kids the dangers of swimming during a thunderstorm.

== In other media ==
- Deep Six appears in the Robot Chicken episode "Big Trouble in Little Clerks 2", voiced by Seth Green. After the pets of the other G.I. Joe members jeopardize the mission, Deep Six ends up dropping his pet blue whale on the Cobra soldiers gushing their blood right at Duke and Deep Six. Duke tells Deep Six that he will get a medal for this.
