= Jim Watson (artist) =

British comics artist

- Born: James Watson; 21 July 1932 Cellardyke, Fife
- Died: 6 December 2017 (aged 85) Cellardyke
- Areas: Writer, Artist

James Watson (21 July 1932 in Cellardyke – 6 December 2017) was a British comics artist most famous for his work on TV Century 21, and boys' comics for DC Thomson and IPC as well as one series for 2000 AD.

== Career ==
Watson began working for advertising agencies in the 1950s and 1960s and gradually built up his comics work.

He provided illustrations for the novelisation of the film Thunderbirds Are Go and later began working for TV Century 21, in particular on Zero X and Captain Scarlet.

He worked for various boys' comics, in particular war comics such as Battle and Commando, and in 1978 contributed the story Colony Earth to 2000 AD, which he also wrote.

When the British comics industry contracted in the late 1980s, Watson found fewer opportunities and began selling paintings.
