= Mutt (G.I. Joe) =

Character from the G.I. Joe franchise

- G.I. Joe character
- Mutt and his dog Junkyard
- First appearance: G.I. Joe: A Real American Hero issue #25 (July 1984)
- Voiced by: Bill Morey (Sunbow/Marvel); Dale Wilson (DiC, Operation Dragonfire); Don Brown (DiC, Season 2)

In-universe information
- Affiliation: G.I. Joe
- Specialty: Dog Handler (K-9)
- File name: Perlmutter, Stanley R.
- Birth place: Iselin, New Jersey
- SN: RA757793443
- Rank: E-4 (Specialist)
- Primary MOS: Dog handler
- Secondary MOS: Infantry
- Subgroups: Slaughter's Marauders; Drug Elimination Force; Anti-Venom Task Force

Mutt is a fictional character from the G.I. Joe: A Real American Hero toyline, comic books and animated series. He is the G.I. Joe Team's dog handler (K-9), and debuted in 1984.

== Profile ==
Mutt's real name is given as Stanley R. Perlmutter, and his rank that of army specialist SP-4 (E-4). He is a native of Iselin, New Jersey. His primary military specialty is dog handler and his secondary military specialty is infantry. On some occasions his rank is given as (staff sergeant) E-6.

Mutt's service record includes graduation from the Jungle Warfare Training School, and had an attachment to a cadre to the Special Ops School and also had a role as an adviser to the Security and Enforcement Committee. Mutt is expert with the M-16, M-14, M1911A1 auto pistol and MAC-11.

Mutt is characterized as a natural with animals and as having had several pet dogs in his youth, which he trained exceptionally well. The smartest of these was Junkyard, who accompanied Mutt into the army. It is suggested that Junkyard is more popular than his master, since he is friendlier than Mutt. Following the retirement from service of the initial Junkyard, his offspring Junkyard II - who is as loyal, smart, and well-trained as his sire - is now Mutt's partner.

In the UK and European Action Force canon Mutt is listed as coming from Madrid in Spain.

== Toys ==
Mutt, with his dog Junkyard, was first released as an action figure in 1984. The figure was repainted and released as part of the Slaughter's Marauders line in 1989.

A new version of Mutt and Junkyard was released as an action figure in 1992, as part of the DEF (Drug Elimination Force) line. The figure was repainted and released as part of the Battle Corps line in 1993. This version was repainted and rereleased a third time as part of the G.I. Joe Collector's Convention in 2004.

In 2004, Mutt and Junkyard were released as part of a Toys R Us exclusive "Anti-Venom Task Force" six-pack. The story behind the Anti-Venom Task Force, is that they are G.I. Joe's response to Doctor Mindbender and Cobra Commander turning civilians into dangerous monsters.

Mutt and Junkyard were released as part of the DTC in 2005. This version is the only Mutt figure not to have facial hair. Mutt and Junkyard were released as part of the 25th anniversary line in 2008.

== Comics ==
=== Marvel Comics ===
In the Marvel Comics G.I. Joe series, he first appeared in G.I. Joe: A Real American Hero #25 (July 1984). In issue #26, Mutt, Torpedo, and Tripwire chase after Firefly and Wild Weasel when they try to escape. The two are captured and the Joe trio then have to deal with Cobra high command. There are running firefights and prisoners taken and lost. Eventually the Joe trio safely make it back to the Joe vessel 'The Jane'.

He is featured in issues #140-142. Mutt, Junkyard and Spirit fight Cobra forces, including many Alley-Vipers, in Millville. The two had traveled there to visit Mutt's family and friends and were on hand to fight a Cobra takeover. Though the Joes start a mini-resistance movement and fight back, Cobra's use of adjustable brainwashing allow them to escape attention for some time. Spirit and Mutt are severely discredited. The two are later exonerated in court.

Mutt and Junkyard later work with the K9 MP team of Law and Order to provide perimeter security for the current Joe base.

=== Devil's Due ===
In the Devil's Due G.I. Joe series he shows up in issue #14. It is revealed Junkyard had died during the seven years the team was disbanded. Mutt is working now with Junkyard's son. He had just been redrawn into the Joe team again; he is a week away from being assigned to one of their secondary bases. Mutt meets up with Bazooka, Alpine, and Rock 'n Roll. They were visiting with Alpine in his new home in Delhi Hills. A few clues lead to the four Joes uncovering a massive Cobra outpost underneath the very bar they are drinking at. With the assistance of the others and Junkyard Junior, the Cobras are forced to flee town. Again, other Joes find no evidence of Cobra activity; it is the veteran status of the four that keep them from real trouble. Confirmation comes much later when an anonymous tip leads Joes to uncover more Cobra influence in Delhi Hills.

Mutt is injured when Cobra officers invade 'The Coffin', G.I. Joe's maximum security prison. Junkyard Jr. is shown standing over him when Storm Shadow stops to check on the situation.

== Animated series ==
=== Sunbow ===
Mutt first appeared in the Sunbow/Marvel G.I. Joe cartoon in "The Revenge of Cobra" mini-series. Mutt was voiced by Bill Morey, while Junkyard's vocal effects were provided by Frank Welker.

Mutt had a supporting role in "The Revenge of Cobra". While pursuing Cobra, Flint, Mutt and Roadblock are caught in a tornado created by Destro's Weather Dominator weapon. The three are trapped into the Pit of Chaos and attacked by strangling vines planted there. Mutt and Junkyard stall the vines with the propulsion system of his Skystriker. Constructing a gyrocopter from Skystriker parts, the Joes attempt to fly away, but Roadblock lets Flint and Mutt escape on their own. Flint and Mutt look for a way back to G.I. Joe headquarters, ending up in a Cobra-run town instead. They enter a café, where they defeat a group of thugs and meet Shipwreck, whom they recruit into the Joe team.

Mutt had another supporting role in the miniseries "The Pyramid of Darkness". He commands the G.I. Joe space shuttle and is captured alongside the other Joes in the Dreadnoks' takeover of the Joes' space station with the help of creatures called Fatal Fluffies. Mutt aids Dusty in learning about Cobra's plans, along with installing a device to allow the Joes on Earth to receive transmissions from the space station. Mutt has Junkyard grab the whistle controlling the Fatal Fluffies for him. He transforms them into their smaller and less dangerous versions by blowing it, allowing the Joes to retake the space station.

Mutt's most prominent appearance in the series was in "Cobra's Creatures". In the episode, Cobra captures Mutt and Junkyard so that Dr. Lucifer, a scientist working for Cobra, can test his high frequency device, which mind-controls animals. Junkyard is turned against Mutt and chases him. Mutt tries to bring Junkyard to his senses, but is forced to fight him. Mutt and Junkyard reconcile after the Joes destroy Cobra's machine that controls animals.

In the two-part episode "The Synthoid Conspiracy", Junkyard senses the synthoids of Duke and General Franks. He attacks Franks' impostor, who then orders the arrest of Mutt and Junkyard. They escape with help from Rock 'n Roll. Shortly after, Mutt and Junkyard encounter Destro, who offers to explain how Cobra turned the Joes' army against them. They distrust and try to attack him, but Destro stuns them with a gas gun. Waking up near a Cobra base, Mutt and Junkyard find and save Duke, who tells them about Cobra's synthoid plot. Duke and Mutt break into Cobra's launch base, where Mutt frees the Joes' captured senior military officers.

In the episode "Cobra Claws Are Coming to Town", Mutt reveals his parents neglected him during the holiday season.

Mutt appears in one of G.I. Joe's public service announcements, in which he teaches a kid not to pet strange animals.

==== G.I. Joe: The Movie ====
Mutt briefly appeared in the 1987 animated film G.I. Joe: The Movie.

=== DiC ===
Mutt appears in the DiC G.I. Joe cartoon, voiced by Dale Wilson.

== Popular culture ==
Mutt and Junkyard appear in the Robot Chicken episode "The Ramblings of Maurice" with Mutt voiced by Seth Green and Junkyard's vocal effects provided by Tom Kane. After Junkyard dies from eating a chocolate statue dedicated to Roadblock, Mutt, alongside the rest of G.I. Joe, honor Junkyard at the funeral where his body is shot into the ocean. In a post-credits scene, Mutt explains that dogs should not eat chocolate due to the toxic substance theobromine in it that causes theobromine poisoning.

== Other works ==
In a 1995 study, Mutt and Junkyard are examined in relation to how G.I. Joe episodes relate to contemporary culture and marketing.
