= Torpedo (G.I. Joe) =

Fictional character in the G.I. Joe universe

- G.I. Joe character
- First appearance: 1983
- Voiced by: Michael Yama (Sunbow/Marvel); Phil Hayes (DiC)

In-universe information
- Affiliation: G.I. Joe
- Specialty: SEAL (Sea, Air and Land)
- File name: Leialoha, Edward W.
- Birth place: Aiea, Hawaii
- SN: RN 946775409
- Rank: CW-4 (Chief Warrant Officer 4)
- Primary MOS: Navy SEAL
- Secondary MOS: Demolitions

Torpedo is a fictional character from the G.I. Joe: A Real American Hero toyline, comic books and animated series. He is the G.I. Joe Team's original SEAL and debuted in 1983.

== Profile ==
His real name is Edward W. Leialoha, and his rank is that of navy chief warrant officer WO-4. Torpedo was born in Aiea, Hawaii. His primary military specialty is Navy SEAL (Sea, Air & Land) and his secondary military specialty is demolitions.

Torpedo was originally a scuba instructor and also achieved black belts in the martial arts Wu-Shu, Kenpō and Go-Ju-Ryu by age 19, and is skilled with wielding the Balisong. His training records after completing SEAL school are classified, but he is a qualified expert in most small arms used by NATO as well as explosive devices used by both NATO and Warsaw Pact nations. Torpedo keeps a strict vegetarian diet and continues to spend time perfecting his fighting skills and marksmanship in his off-duty hours. His teammates recognize him as a very competent professional, but they also say his personality is like a cold fish.

Writer Larry Hama gave him his file name after Steve Leialoha.

== Toys ==
Torpedo was first released as an action figure in 1983. His accessories included flippers and a harpoon.

A version of Torpedo with no accessories came with the Built to Rule Rapid Runner in 2004. The forearms and the calves of the figure sported places where blocks could be attached.

== Comics ==
=== Marvel Comics ===
In the Marvel Comics G.I. Joe series, he first appeared in G.I. Joe: A Real American Hero #13 (July 1983). He assists in repelling a Cobra terrorist attack on the U.S. Mint; he is shown shooting a Cobra soldier in the chest with his spear gun.

Later, he assists Mutt and Tripwire in recon of Zartan's Dreadnoks headquarters. This takes place deep in the Florida Everglades. They get into a running gunfight with most of Cobra high command. The trio escapes successfully.

Torpedo and Snow-Job pilot the Joe hovercraft, the W.H.A.L.E. and destroy a Cobra force operating on an atoll in the middle of the Gulf of Mexico.

Torpedo and Wet Suit are sent to infiltrate Cobra Island after a mission of passive surveillance sees the Oktober Guard doing the same. The two come into conflict with Croc Master's crocodiles and try to take the opportunity to kidnap Cobra Commander. They ally with the Guard, battle Cobra forces and are forced to retreat in a stolen Cobra vehicle.

Torpedo is one of the many G.I. Joe soldiers to take part in the Cobra Island civil war. In G.I. Joe: A Real American Hero #76 (Sept. 1988) he is shown as part of a secondary assault team attack Cobra Commander's position from the swampy west.

=== IDW ===
Torpedo goes undercover as a surfer, along with Lady Jaye to spy on suspected Cobra operations. This goes bad when both are assaulted and injured by the Baroness.

== Animated series ==
=== Sunbow ===
Torpedo appeared in the original G.I. Joe animated series. He first appeared in the episode "The Worms of Death", the third part of "The M.A.S.S. Device" miniseries, in which he is one of the Joes participating in the mission to obtain a heavy water element and the ensuing battle with Cobra. He also proposes to the Baroness that both G.I. Joe and Cobra team up against the giant tubeworms.

Torpedo appears in a G.I. Joe Public Service Announcement where he tells a kid who had fallen into the ocean how to tread water until help arrives.

=== DiC ===
Torpedo appeared in the DiC G.I. Joe cartoon.

=== Spy Troops and Valor vs. Venom ===
Torpedo appeared in the direct-to-video CGI animated movies G.I. Joe: Spy Troops and G.I. Joe: Valor vs. Venom, voiced by Phil Hayes.

== Video games ==
Torpedo is one of the featured characters in the 1985 G.I. Joe: A Real American Hero computer game.
