= Flash (G.I. Joe) =

Fictional character in G.I. Joe

- G.I. Joe character
- First appearance: G.I. Joe issue #1 (June 1982)
- Voiced by: Frank Welker

In-universe information
- Affiliation: G.I. Joe
- Specialty: Laser Rifle Trooper
- File name: Gambello, Anthony S.
- Birth place: Lodi, CA
- SN: RA607432985
- Rank: E-4 (Corporal) (1982); E-5 (Sergeant) (2007)
- Primary MOS: Infantry
- Secondary MOS: Electronics

Flash is a fictional character from the G.I. Joe: A Real American Hero toyline, comic books and animated series. He is the G.I. Joe Team's original laser rifle trooper and debuted in 1982.

== Profile ==
His real name is Anthony S. Gambello, and his rank is that of corporal E-4. Flash was born in Lodi, California.

His primary military specialty is infantry and his secondary military specialty is electronics CBR. He is highly skilled in many aspects of electronic technology and equipment repair, and has a master's degree in electronic engineering. Flash enlisted and received specialized training in the Army Electronics School, Chemical School and Covert Electronics. Later, he was assigned to the Aberdeen Proving Ground's covert electronics division, where his new laser range finder led him to be recruited by General Flagg. He is a qualified expert with the M16, M1911A1, and XMLR-1A (shoulder-fired laser rifle).

== Toys ==
Flash was first released as an action figure in 1982. All of the original sixteen figures from 1982 were released with "straight arms." The same figure was re-released in 1983 with "swivel-arm battle grip", which made it easier for figures to hold their rifles and accessories. The swivel-arm version of the figure was included in the "Original Team" mail-away set in 1986.

== Comics ==
=== Marvel Comics ===
In the Marvel Comics G.I. Joe series, he first appeared in issue #1, as part of the first thirteen G.I. Joe soldiers. He went with the attack force to rescue noted pacifist Dr. Adele Burkhart. He and Breaker successfully destroy Cobra's radar station and Burkhart is rescued.

The two would team up again when Cobra attempts to destroy a United States space shuttle. They become part of the shuttle's crew. While on a spacewalk, Flash grabs a Cobra missile, manually diverts it and saves the lives of everyone involved.

At the re-dedication of the team's underground headquarters, Flash and most of the original Joes were reassigned to administrative duties. This was not the end of his missions. He participates in the Joe invasion of the town of Springfield in issue #50. A soldier wearing his typical uniform discovers underground transport tunnels but this man refers to himself as Zap, another of Flash's original teammates.

Flash makes a cameo in #57, analyzing captured pieces of the pre-fab Cobra fortress Terror Drome.

Flash was one of the few Joes not involved in the Cobra civil war. He was involved in the aftereffects. A group of corrupt Pentagon generals framed the Joes as traitors and arrested the majority of the team. Those Joes who could, including Flash, Grunt and Roadblock, went underground. Dr. Burkhart, though still a pacifist, provides them with backup and support. The fugitive Joes organize and pull off a rescue of General Hawk and longtime Joe ally General Hollingsworth from an enemy-controlled hospital. Due to the influence of Destro the Joe team is cleared of all charges.

Flash later trains new Joe recruits until the team was disbanded.

=== Devil's Due Comics ===
Flash participates in the mission to stop Tyler Wingfield, a murderous madman. Joining him are Tripwire, Beach Head and Airtight. All are concerned with fellow Joe Chuckles, who has infiltrated Wingfield's group. They discuss the possibility of having to shoot him. The foursome are captured and Wingfield tells Chuckles, as a test of loyalty, to choose a Joe to shoot. Despite this, Flash and the others all survive.

He then gets his turn to attack Cobra Island, which is being held by a revived Serpentor and his 'Coil' army. Flash is part of a team sent in to destroy an EMP generator station. He splits off from the group with the Joe computer expert Mainframe. 'Coil' troops capture the two. All perish moments later when the bomb destroys the station. Flash's last words were "Mission Accomplished".

Flash's name was added to a G.I. Joe memorial at Arlington National Cememtary.

=== G.I. Joe Vs. Transformers ===
In the Devil's Due crossover, Flash assists Sci-Fi in battling Autobots. The Joes swiftly realize the robots' peaceful intentions and establish friendly relations.

== Animated series ==
=== Sunbow ===
He first appeared in the G.I. Joe animated series in the A Real American Hero mini-series, voiced by Frank Welker. His only major role came in the episode "Operation: Mind Menace". He joined Airborne in tracking down Cobra to a base on Easter Island after they kidnapped a Hawaiian girl who possessed psychic abilities. Unfortunately, Airborne's brother Tommy was being kidnapped at the same time and the trauma of the event affected the psychic link Tommy and Airborne shared. The Joes were captured by Cobra and Cobra Commander used Tommy's abilities to animate two Easter Island heads into transforming into giant stone warriors and attacking the Joes. Flash and Airborne fought off their attackers until they were rescued by Duke and Lady Jaye. Flash then took part in the attack on Cobra's base atop K-12. He and Stalker teamed up to free the Hawaiian girl from Cobra's clutches.

==== G.I. Joe: The Movie ====
In G.I. Joe: The Movie, Flash can be seen in the background during the Battle of Cobra-La.

== Video games ==
Flash appears as a playable character in the video game G.I. Joe: The Rise of Cobra.
