= Steele Wool =

- Directed by: Frank Cappello
- Written by: Frank Cappello
- Produced by: Frank Cappello; Cami Varela
- Starring: Cami Varela; Frank Cappello
- Edited by: Frank Cappello
- Music by: Frank Cappello
- Production company: Indelible Quarks
- Distributed by: Indie Rights
- Release date: 2019
- Running time: 103 minutes
- Country: United States
- Language: English

Steele Wool is a 2019 American dark comedy thriller film directed by Frank Cappello and starring Cami Varela and Cappello himself.

In the film, a deaf woman kills her abusive husband with her bare hands during a fight between them. She is subsequently hired as a contract killer. She loves her new job, until one of her targets captures her. He tries to test whether he can kill humans through use of sonic weapons.

== Plot ==
Tony Steele's deaf ex-girlfriend Daphne Wool kills her abusive husband during a fight before Joey, the hitman hired to kill him, gets a chance to do the job. Joey is impressed by Daphne's ability to kill a man with her bare hands and introduces her to The Boss, who hires her to be a contract killer.

Daphne's first task is to pose as a real estate agent to kill a prospective buyer, but the house is unfurnished and empty of any tools for her to use to carry out the job. She uses all he has, a paper clip, by straightening it and putting it in the target's drink so that he chokes on it and dies.

Daphne is thrilled by her new profession that gives her a sense of adventure, but one of her targets captures her and Tony and tests the lethal capability of sound waves on them. Joey arrives and helps them escape together with the dog of one of the target's previous victims.

== Cast ==
- Cami Varela as Daphne Wool
- Frank Cappello as Tony Steele
- Nicholas Ontiveros as Moses
- Arina Manta as Ileana
- Danny Yang as Joey
- Sean Jacoby as Jacob
- Stefan Pommepuy as Raymond Armel
- Jamison Jones as The Boss
- Johnny Cicco as Vincent McCabe
- Daniel Blake as Groom
- Seriina Covarrubias as Girl with Dog
- Marieh Delfino as Seana Armel
- Howie Gold as Harvey
- Cameron Gray as Valentino
- Gabriella Korte as Bride
- Daniel Kotto as Best Man
- Jude Leepson as Jude Armel
- Elyse Mirto as Sharen DeVanue
- RJ Moten as Camera Techie
- Keith Moua as Chief Techie
- Blayke Rifley as Bridesmaid
- Rachel Seiferth as Edith
- Rob Simone as Jim
- Danny Yang as Joey

== Reception ==
Reviewer Jim McLennan of girlswithguns.org gave the film a rating of 3 out of 5 stars, writing, "Daphne is played gloriously against all the tropes of the female assassin: it’s no coincidence her most effective undercover disguise is an estate agent. Add to this, Varela is deaf: this element affects, yet does not define, her character and that’s exactly the way disability should be portrayed. It is even worked nicely in to the plot, with one of McCabe’s weapons in development being a sonic cannon. However, I’d like to have seen more of her in action; perhaps for budgetary reasons, this is limited, or perhaps Cappello just wasn’t interested in that aspect."

Reviewer Alan Ng of filmthreat.com wrote, "When a story lays tonally flat, it’s challenging to engage and connect with the audience. If the stakes were higher, we’d root for the protagonist. If the jokes where funnier, we’d wait for the next one. If the drama were grounded, then we can connect with the character’s plight. It’s not to say there weren’t moments. There is a moment of connection when Daphne executes her first kill, but it’s just not enough. Engage and connect with the audience." He concluded, "Overall, Steele Wool tells a solid story, with heart, and mild laughs, but it really needed a moment to burst out with a ball of energy from somewhere to shake up its mild tone."

Reviewer Richard Propes of theindependentcritic.com wrote, "I'd be remiss if not giving Cappello and Varela much respect for the film's authentic representation and for sticking a middle finger up at anything resembling the usual inspiration porn disability stereotypes. Instead, Varela's Daphne is a badass with a heart who's also deaf and who also uses a cochlear implant throughout the course of the film."
