= Frank Cappello =

American film director

- Born: United States
- Education: Carnegie Mellon University (BFA)
- Years active: 1986–present

Frank A. Cappello is an American filmmaker. His credits include writing the screenplay for Constantine and writing, directing and producing He Was a Quiet Man.

== Filmography ==
Year	Title	Director	Writer	Producer	Notes
1991	Suburban Commando	No	Yes	No	Also creative consultant
1993	American Yakuza	Yes	No	No	
1995	No Way Back	Yes	Yes	No	
1999	The Rain in Spain	No	Yes	No	
2005	Constantine	No	Yes	No	
2007	He Was a Quiet Man	Yes	Yes	Yes	Also worked on songs "Not today", "You And I" and "For You"
2019	Steele Wool	Yes	Yes	Yes	
TBA	The Womb	Yes	Yes	Yes	Also cinematographer and actor
TBA	Malibu Gothic	Yes	Yes	Executive	TV series
