= Howard Gottfried =

American film producer

- Born: November 13, 1923; Manhattan, New York City, U.S.
- Died: December 8, 2017 (aged 94); Los Angeles, California, U.S.
- Education: New York University
- Occupation: Film producer
- Spouse: Mary Lynn Gottfried
- Children: 2 daughters
- Parent(s): Louis Gottfried; Fanny Gottfried

Howard Kenneth Gottfried (November 13, 1923 – December 8, 2017) was an American film producer. He produced many films, including The Hospital, Network, Torch Song Trilogy, and Suburban Commando.

Gottfried served in the U.S. Army during World War II. He was raised in the Bronx and graduated from City College of New York and the New York University School of Law. He began practicing law in New York and produced off-Broadway theater in his spare time.
