= The Undertaker =

American professional wrestler (born 1965)

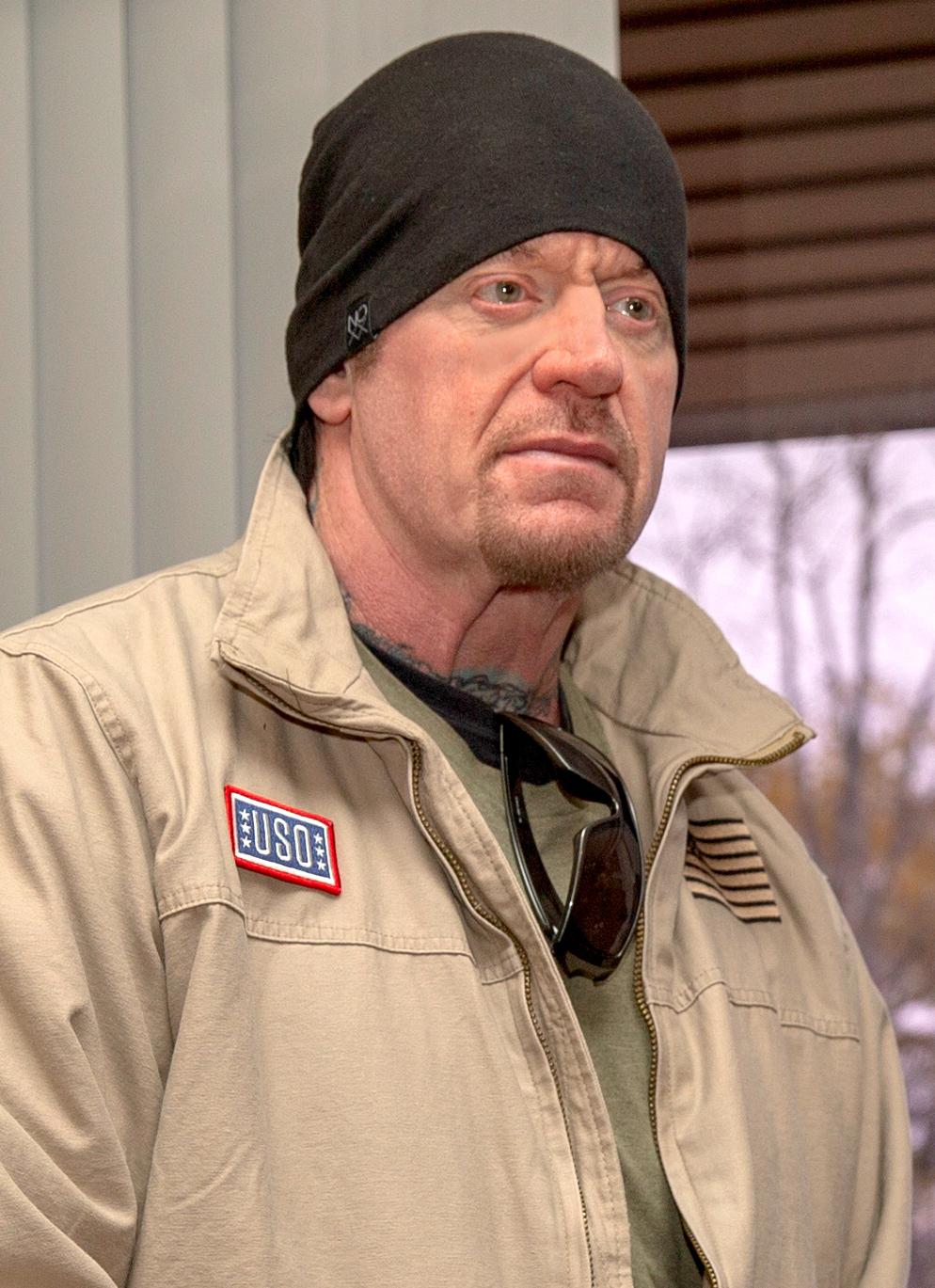
- Calaway in 2019

Personal information
- Born: Mark William Calaway; March 24, 1965 (age 61) Houston, Texas, U.S.
- Spouses: Jodi Lynn (m. 1989; div. 1999); Sara Frank (m. 2000; div. 2007); Michelle McCool (m. 2010)
- Children: 5

Professional wrestling career
- Ring names: Cain the Undertaker; Commando; Boris Dragu; Mark Callous; Mean Mark Callous; Mean Mark; Dice Morgan; The Master of Pain; The Punisher; Texas Red; Texas Red Jack; The Undertaker
- Billed height: 6 ft 10 in (208 cm)
- Billed weight: 309 lb (140 kg)
- Billed from: Death Valley; Houston, Texas
- Trained by: Buzz Sawyer; Rick Davidson; John Davidson
- Debut: June 26, 1987
- Retired: November 22, 2020 (Note: Calaway retired on June 21, 2020, during the final episode of WWE Network series Undertaker: The Last Ride. He later confirmed to TheWrap on November 13 that he was "officially retired". WWE held an official retirement ceremony for Calaway on November 22.)

YouTube information
- Channel: Undertaker
- Years active: 2025–present
- Genre: Professional wrestling
- Subscribers: 555 thousand
- Views: 416.5 million
- Last updated: November 7, 2026

Signature
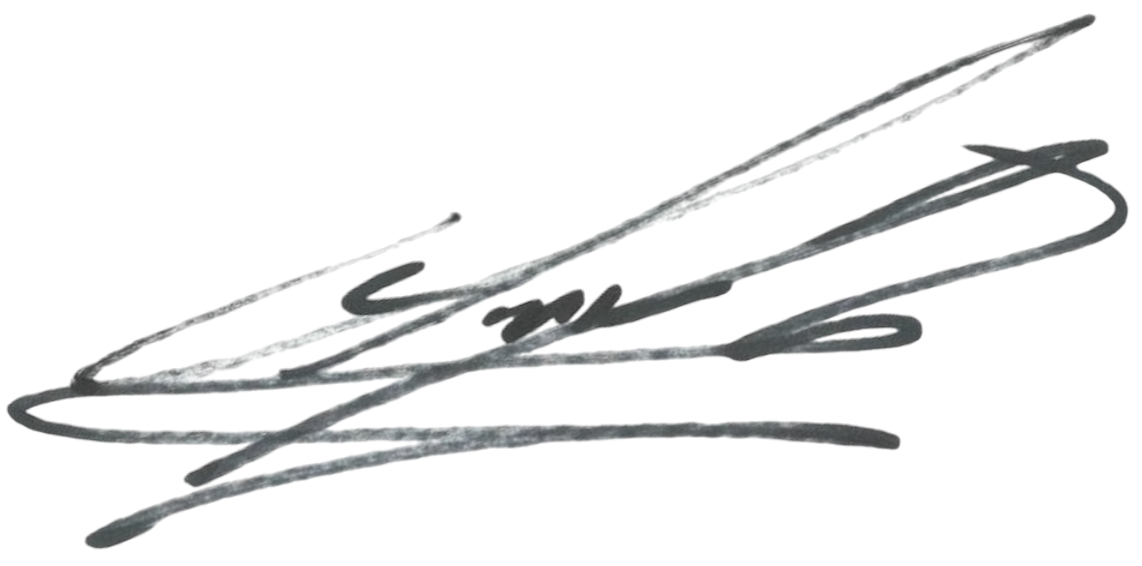

Mark William Calaway (born March 24, 1965), known by his ring name the Undertaker, is an American retired professional wrestler. He is signed to WWE, where he is a brand ambassador as well as a writer and executive producer for its sister promotion Lucha Libre AAA Worldwide (AAA). Calaway spent the vast majority of his in-ring career wrestling for WWE and was inducted into the WWE Hall of Fame in 2022.

Calaway began his career in 1987, working under various gimmicks for World Class Championship Wrestling (WCCW) and other affiliate promotions. He signed with World Championship Wrestling (WCW) in 1989 for a brief stint, and then joined the World Wrestling Federation (WWF, now WWE) in 1990.

Calaway rebranded himself as "the Undertaker" when he joined the WWF. As one of WWE's most high-profile and enduring characters, The Undertaker is famed for his funerary theming around an undead, macabre "Deadman" persona, which gained significant mainstream popularity and won him the Wrestling Observer Newsletter award for Best Gimmick a record-setting 5 years in a row. He is the longest-tenured wrestler in company history at 30 years. In 2000, the Undertaker adopted a biker identity nicknamed "American Badass". Calaway resurrected the Deadman gimmick in 2004, with residual elements of the "American Badass" remaining.

The Undertaker was known for his role in WWE's flagship event WrestleMania. He achieved 21 consecutive victories at WrestleMania, referred to in WWE as The Streak. He headlined the event five times (13, 24, 26, 33, and 36 – Night 1), while having a match at a record 27 total events (only missing WrestleMania 2000 and 35 from his debut to retirement). He is also known for pairing with his in-storyline half-brother Kane, with whom he alternatively feuded and teamed (as the Brothers of Destruction) from 1997 through 2020. During his wrestling career under the Undertaker gimmick, Calaway won the WWF/E Championship four times, the World Heavyweight Championship three times, the Hardcore Championship once and the World Tag Team Championship six times. He also won the Royal Rumble match in 2007.

== Early life ==
Mark William Calaway was born in Houston, Texas, on March 24, 1965. He has four older brothers named David, Michael, Paul, and Timothy (died March 2020, aged 63). He attended Waltrip High School, where he was a member of the football and basketball teams. He graduated in 1983 and began studying on a basketball scholarship at Angelina College in Lufkin, Texas. In 1985, he enrolled in Texas Wesleyan University in Fort Worth, Texas, where he majored in sport management and played as a center for the Rams in the 1985–1986 season. In 1986, Calaway dropped out of university to focus on a career in sports and briefly considered playing professional basketball in Europe, before deciding to focus on professional wrestling.

== Professional wrestling career ==
=== Early career (1987–1989) ===
Calaway began training under Buzz Sawyer in late 1986; he disliked Sawyer, who reportedly lacked commitment and provided a limited education. Calaway learned "on the job" thereafter. Performing under a mask as "Texas Red", Calaway wrestled his first match on June 26, 1987, for World Class Championship Wrestling (WCCW), losing to Bruiser Brody at the Dallas Sportatorium. He was accompanied to the ring by Percival "Percy" Pringle III, who would later serve as his manager in the WWF as Paul Bearer. Two myths have circulated regarding Calaway's beginnings in the industry, the first being that he made his in-ring debut in 1984, and the second being that he was trained by former WCCW colleague Don Jardine (aka The Spoiler). While never trained by Jardine, Calaway was an admirer of his work and would emulate Jardine's top rope walk. PWInsider's Mike Johnson stated, "Undertaker using some of Jardine's style eventually morphed into this story that he was trained by Jardine."

He wrestled in Durban, South Africa on August 22, 1987, as "Texas Red Jack", losing to Tiger Singh. He would also wrestle in prison shows under the name "Boris Dragu", a Russian grave digger.

In 1988, Calaway developed a military gimmick named The Commando and wrestled in the Chicago area for Central Illinois Wrestling. He would also have a brief stint in Georgia for Southern Championship Wrestling.

By the end of 1988, Calaway joined the Continental Wrestling Association, wrestling under several gimmicks. On February 2, 1989, managed by Dutch Mantel, he was reintroduced as "The Master of Pain", a former murderer. On April 1, The Master of Pain won his first professional wrestling championship by defeating Jerry Lawler for the USWA Unified World Heavyweight Champion. Just over three weeks had passed when Lawler became the first man to pin him, giving it back to him. While performing as The Punisher upon returning to Dallas, Calaway won the USWA Texas Heavyweight Championship on October 5, 1989, when Eric Embry forfeited the title.

=== World Championship Wrestling (1989–1990) ===
By the end of 1989, Calaway joined World Championship Wrestling (WCW) as a heel and adopted the ring name "Mean Mark" Callous, a name devised for him by Terry Funk. He was portrayed as a sinister force, wearing predominantly black ring attire and was described by commentator Jim Ross as having a fondness for pet snakes and the music of Ozzy Osbourne. Callous was promptly drafted into The Skyscrapers tag team to replace a legitimately injured Sid Vicious, and made his debut on January 3, 1990, in a match later televised against Agent Steel and Randy Harris. The new team gained some notoriety at Clash of the Champions X when they beat down the Road Warriors after their match. However, Callous's partner Dan Spivey left WCW days before their Chicago Street Fight against the Road Warriors at WrestleWar. Callous and a replacement masked Skyscraper were defeated in the street fight and the team broke up soon afterwards. Now a singles wrestler, Callous took on the guidance of Paul E. Dangerously (Paul Heyman).

Calaway later began to question his future in WCW after being told by company booker, Ole Anderson, during contract renewal discussions that nobody would ever pay money to watch him perform. It was in response to this that Calaway made numerous efforts to join the World Wrestling Federation, going to many lengths to land a meeting with Vince McMahon. However, accessing and securing an interview with McMahon was described by Calaway as a despairing task.

Among routes Calaway took to land a meeting with McMahon was trying to convince individuals acquainted with McMahon or already existing WWF talent to recommend him into the WWF, such as Hulk Hogan, Paul Heyman, and Bruce Prichard, crediting the latter two for arranging the meeting at McMahon's mansion.

Calaway immediately gave notice to WCW before the interview took place. McMahon initially declined to hire Calaway; however, several days later the owner pitched the idea of an "Old West Undertaker", a concept he had intended to create for several years but had never found an appropriate wrestler to play the part.

Calaway's final WCW match was on September 7 at a WorldWide taping in Amarillo, Texas in which he defeated Dave Johnson. During his time in WCW, Calaway briefly wrestled in New Japan Pro-Wrestling (NJPW) as "Punisher" Dice Morgan. After leaving WCW, he briefly returned to the USWA to participate in a tournament to determine the new USWA Unified World Heavyweight Champion; Calaway defeated Bill Dundee in the first round, but lost to Jerry Lawler in the quarterfinals.

=== World Wrestling Federation/Entertainment/WWE ===
==== Debut of the Undertaker (1990–1991) ====
In October 1990, Calaway signed with the World Wrestling Federation (WWF), set to portray the "brainchild" of McMahon that he had assigned to him, originally entitled Cain the Undertaker ("Cain" later added on to "the Undertaker" moniker by the time of his arrival at the urgings of Bruce Prichard, who had always desired a Cain and Abel effect for his character). Despite Calaway's perplexed, pessimistic feelings about McMahon's gimmick idea, he was readily accepting of the role, feeling anything better than the laughingstock gimmicks of that time, such as The Gobbledy Gooker. Cain the Undertaker was characterized as a menacing derivative of the Wild West undertakers depicted in television westerns. Resulting from that, this first edition of the Undertaker's series of Deadman incarnations has been distinguished in external media as "The Old West Mortician". He made his overall WWF debut on a November 19, 1990, taping of WWF Superstars quickly defeating his first opponent, Mario Mancini, in a singles match (this match was filmed three days prior to the Undertaker's televised debut at Survivor Series on November 22, but did not air on television until December 15, 1990). Also prior to his Survivor Series appearance, Cain the Undertaker had a match on November 20 against Rick Sampson, which later aired on the December 9, 1990 episode of WWF Wrestling Challenge.

Calaway's official live televised debut was at Survivor Series in which he was presented as the heel mystery partner of Ted DiBiase's "Million Dollar Team". Approximately one minute into the match, the Undertaker eliminated Koko B. Ware with his finisher, the Tombstone Piledriver. (In 2018, Koko B. Ware shared that directly following this match that night, he confronted the Undertaker with serious objections to what he felt was a botched Tombstone. Though Ware also shared that he always admired Mark Calaway and perceived him as a great performer). During the match, the Undertaker also eliminated Dusty Rhodes before being counted out; however, his team won the match with DiBiase being the sole survivor. During the match, Calaway was referred to as simply the Undertaker, omitting the portion "Cain", which was dropped shortly after the event (and seven years later at the urgings of Prichard, given to another wrestler once he took on the role of the Undertaker's younger brother). Throughout the end of 1990, the Undertaker mostly picked up squash victories against jobbers on Superstars of Wrestling and Wrestling Challenge tapings. He was a participant in the 1991 Royal Rumble match which was won by Hulk Hogan.

In February 1991, Brother Love delegated his short-lived management role of the Undertaker over to Paul Bearer (real-life funeral director), Love communicating the need for someone who better aligned with the Undertaker's "deadman" themes. Histrionic, wailing and ghostly in character, Bearer complemented the Undertaker and was almost always seen bearing an urn which he raised in the air to transmit supernatural healing powers to the Undertaker; this typically resulted in the Undertaker recovering from attacks and counterattacking his adversaries. During his early years, the Undertaker took to a post-match ritual of placing his defeated opponents (almost always jobbers) in a body bag and carrying them backstage. He continued picking up victories in squash matches leading up to his first feud in the WWF with "Superfly" Jimmy Snuka.

==== WWF Champion and beginning of The Streak (1991–1994) ====
The Undertaker made his WrestleMania debut at WrestleMania VII on March 24, 1991, quickly defeating "Superfly" Jimmy Snuka. He began his first major feud shortly thereafter, which was with Ultimate Warrior when the Undertaker attacked him and locked him in an airtight casket on the set of Paul Bearer's Funeral Parlor segment.

The Undertaker defeated Hulk Hogan to win his first WWF Championship at Survivor Series with the help of Ric Flair and thus became the youngest WWF Champion in history to that point, 26 years of age—this record was later broken by Yokozuna in April 1993 at WrestleMania IX. The Undertaker's Tombstone of Hogan to win the WWF Championship at the 1991 Survivor Series created real-life, offscreen discord between the two, which Undertaker attributes his short title reign, lack of title runs during his early career and distrust of Hogan. In storyline, however, WWF President Jack Tunney ordered a rematch between the two at This Tuesday in Texas six days later, where the Undertaker lost the title back to Hogan.

In February 1992, the Undertaker's ally Jake "The Snake" Roberts tried to attack "Macho Man" Randy Savage's manager/wife Miss Elizabeth with a steel chair when Undertaker stopped him, turning him (and Paul Bearer) face for the first time. Their face turn was solidified on the February 29 episode of Superstars when Roberts confronted the Undertaker on the Funeral Parlor set over the matter (aired on Saturday Night's Main Event XXX). The Undertaker defeated Roberts at WrestleMania VIII. He then feuded extensively with wrestlers managed by Harvey Wippleman throughout 1992 and 1993, such as Kamala and Giant González. According to Calaway, working with González "... was survival every night trying to figure out what he could do" and "took years off my career". He faced González at WrestleMania IX, which is notable as The Undertaker's only disqualification win at WrestleMania after the use of chloroform.

The Undertaker's next rivalry initiated at Survivor Series with Yokozuna when a clash between the two lost control, causing them to be counted out in an elimination tag match. In the weeks following, the Undertaker and Bearer spooked Yokozuna with multiple segments from their wintery and remote rural area workshop. The feud culminated in a WWF Championship casket match at the Royal Rumble in January 1994. During the match, Yokozuna sealed the Undertaker in the casket with the assistance of a multitude of heel wrestlers (some of them Whippleman-managed) hired by Yokozuna's vindictive managers Jim Cornette and Mr. Fuji, which was in retaliation for Bearer's casket match stipulation that he snuck into their Royal Rumble match contract. After being trapped inside the casket by the pack, green vapor emitted from the casket and the arena lights went out. Undertaker then appeared from inside the casket on the video screen, representing the spirit of his dead corpse, warning that he would produce a future "rebirth" of himself, explaining to his antagonists that he cannot and will not Rest in Peace. The Undertaker did not appear in the WWF for seven months after his loss to Yokozuna. In reality, he was given time off to allow a back injury to heal, and to attend his first son's birth.

==== Rebirthed Deadman (1994–1996) ====
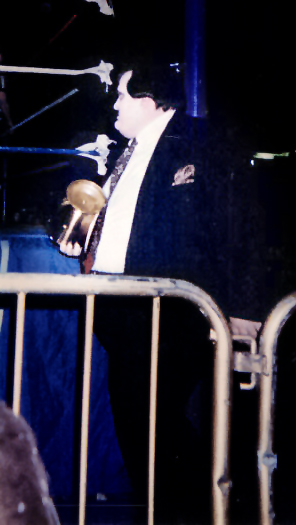
Paul Bearer betrayed the Undertaker by hitting him with the urn that he is seen carrying. The attack left a noticeable dent and it is now a WWE artifact.

Following the death angle at the Royal Rumble during the Undertaker's absence, the WWF promoted reported sightings of him through video clips of random people claiming to have seen him. After WrestleMania X, Ted DiBiase introduced an Undertaker back to the WWF. This Undertaker, however, played by Brian Lee (one of Calaway's real-life best friends) was an impostor Undertaker (dubbed "The Underfaker" by fans) rejuvenated by Dibiase's money rather than Bearer's urn. His actions led to the return of the real Undertaker at SummerSlam, defeating the impostor and appearing as a reincarnation of his Deadman gimmick, one of a more shadowy, mysterious and secret presence. Represented now by cool colors, the Undertaker replaced details of his wrestling gear that were previously colored gray with purple, and effected scenes with blue/purple semidarkness. Many details that would become associated with the Undertaker for the remainder of his career were produced during this rebirth incarnation, such as the addition of sleeve tattoos and Godlike supernatural elements (thunder, lightning and windy weather-like effects used to indicate the Undertaker's presence and wrath).

Throughout most of 1995, Undertaker feuded with members of Ted DiBiase's Million Dollar Corporation. The chain of wrestlers DiBiase enlisted to do away with the Undertaker started with Irwin R. Schyster at the Royal Rumble for which the Undertaker was victorious, but assaulted by another member of the Million Dollar Team, King Kong Bundy. While being assaulted, Bearer was deprived of his urn by the Corporation.

At WrestleMania XI, the Undertaker made short work of Bundy in a singles match. This edition of WrestleMania included the first mention of the Undertaker's historic WrestleMania-winning Streak, acknowledged on commentary by Vince McMahon as Undertaker made his entrance: "the Undertaker, on his way to the ring—a man who's never lost at WrestleMania." At Survivor Series when the Undertaker returned, he began wearing a Phantom of the Opera-like, gray upper-face mask to safeguard his orbital injury while it healed. The following month in December, the Undertaker defeated Mabel in a casket match at In Your House, retrieving the urn, which had been traded between several of the Undertaker's antagonists over the course of the year.

In the main event of the Royal Rumble in January 1996, the Undertaker was unmasked of his Phantom of the Opera-like facial covering in a WWF Championship match against Bret Hart. The Undertaker was eventually able to hit the Tombstone Piledriver on Hart, but Diesel interfered, costing the Undertaker the championship. A rematch for the title on the February 5 episode of Raw saw similar interference. At that month's In Your House: Rage in the Cage, while Diesel was facing Hart in a steel cage match for the WWF Championship, the Undertaker delivered a surprise attack, emerging from a hole he had ripped through the ring canvas and dragging Diesel with him down under amid a cloud of smoke, allowing Hart the victory. After several weeks of more retaliatory one-upmanship between Diesel and the Undertaker, their feud culminated in a singles match at WrestleMania XII, where Undertaker was victorious.

The Undertaker's next feud commenced the following night on Raw when Mankind, a twisted and tortured soul, made his debut and randomly interfered in Undertaker's match against Justin "Hawk" Bradshaw. For the next few months, Mankind viciously ambushed the Undertaker and cost him multiple matches. Among them, Mankind cost the Undertaker the WWF Intercontinental Championship by interfering in his casket match against Goldust at In Your House 8: Beware of Dog. In interfering in this match, Mankind proved to have mystifying horror tactic capabilities that matched the Undertaker's, mysteriously appearing from inside the casket and sealing the Undertaker inside. The Undertaker, however, had vanished amid a cloud of smoke once the casket lid was opened. As a result of the interference and repeated ambushes from Mankind on the Undertaker throughout the ensuing weeks, the Undertaker and Mankind competed in their first on-screen bout at the 1996 King of the Ring, a heated encounter in which the Undertaker presented as uncharacteristically intense. During the match, Bearer inadvertently hit the Undertaker with the urn, allowing Mankind to incapacitate the Undertaker with his finisher, the Mandible Claw, and score the win.

After more than 20 minutes of brawling with Mankind in the Cleveland Gund Arena's boiler room, the arena corridors, the SummerSlam entrance area and aisleway to the ring, the Undertaker reached for Paul Bearer's urn in an attempt to win the match, but Bearer struck him with it, betraying the Undertaker. This followed with Bearer allowing Mankind to take hold of the urn, thus winning this match.

According to Paul Bearer in shoot interviews, the WWF planned for Bearer to betray the Undertaker during the match as part of the buildup to the arrival of Kane and the storyline that would follow the next year. Around this time, fans were also said to be growing tired of the recurring “urn” storyline. The original plan for the Boiler Room Brawl was for the Undertaker and Bearer to turn heel while Mankind turned face. However, the Undertaker reportedly refused to turn heel, instead proposing that Paul Bearer betray him while he remained a face character.

After Bearer's betrayal, the Undertaker grew more aggressive, resolving his feud against Goldust (Mankind's comrade in tormenting the Undertaker) at In Your House 10: Mind Games. The Undertaker then took his rivalry with Mankind to new lengths in a specialty match of his own, and at that time unprecedented Buried Alive match to take place in the main event of In Your House 11: Buried Alive. The Undertaker won the match after chokeslamming Mankind into the open grave and subsequently shoveling enough dirt on him so that he was covered. However, after interference from the debuting Executioner, as well as the help of several other heel wrestlers apparently enlisted by Bearer, Mankind escaped the grave and together the mob all shoveled dirt onto the Undertaker to the point that the grave was completely filled, resulting in the Undertaker fully buried alive. Not without a parting message for the pack, however, the Undertaker's purple glove fit hand emerged from his burying place amid a bolt of lightning that had erupted over the gravesite. The scene sent all of his antagonists fleeing.

==== Lord of Darkness (1996–1998) ====
After being buried alive and a following month-long hiatus, the Undertaker returned at the Survivor Series again pitting him against Mankind, but with a unique stipulation: Hanging 6.1 m (20 ft) above the ring would be Paul Bearer, enclosed in a steel cage. And if the Undertaker were to win the match, he would be rewarded the opportunity to assault Bearer however he pleased. Even though the Undertaker won this match, interference from The Executioner enabled Bearer to escape Undertaker's clutches. It was also at this event that the Undertaker had developed a comparatively more humanized and more informal yet still superhuman "Deadman" incarnation. In this then new form, he took on a Goth appearance and persona, with a brash, rebelling, Championship-driven mean streak (perhaps to better fit in with the then-budding, more adult-oriented Attitude Era). This delivering, dubbed "The Lord of Darkness", was the 3rd incarnation of his Deadman persona.

The Undertaker won the WWF Championship for the second time by defeating Sycho Sid at WrestleMania 13. Reviving his first Deadman incarnation for that night only, the Undertaker appeared as the "Old West Mortician", donning the trademarked gray wrestling gear accessories (boot spats, tie, gloves), along with a pitch-black entrance with only a white spotlight shined over him, contrasted from the purple/blue semidarkness associated with the rest of his Deadman incarnations.

Following his WWF Championship win at WrestleMania 13, Paul Bearer attempted to rejoin the Undertaker as his manager. After the Undertaker refused and attacked Bearer, Bearer had Mankind set a fireball to the Undertaker's face, leading up to a match at In Your House 14: Revenge of the 'Taker, for which the Undertaker was victorious. Evening the score at "Revenge of the 'Taker", the Undertaker set a fireball to Bearer's face directly following the match. Following the event, Bearer bandaged up from fire burns, likened the Undertaker's assault to a past incident he described as the Undertaker's "deepest, darkest secret". Through giving the Undertaker the ultimatum of revealing his deepest, darkest secret to the world, Bearer was able to reunite with him as manager and protégé. After only a few months of abrasive behaviors from Bearer, however, the Undertaker lost his patience and rejected Bearer as his manager. In retaliation, Bearer disclosed that the Undertaker had intentionally killed his family by burning down his parents' family funeral home for which they raised him and his younger brother. (Note that the younger brother, Kane, was not revealed to be the Undertaker's half-brother until the following year, April 1998, when Bearer disclosed to the world that he is Kane's father, the Undertaker's mother having had an affair with him. Bearer later verified this with DNA test results). At this point in his career, the Undertaker denied the charges of committing the arson murder that killed his family; however, Bearer claimed to have proof in the form of the Undertaker's alive and well younger brother, Kane, who had survived though scarred and burned. Bearer raised Kane after the fire, having him institutionalized from the date of the fire into adulthood. Ever since the fire, Kane had been awaiting to exact vengeance on his older half-brother. In defense, Undertaker responded that Kane, a "pyromaniac", had been the one to set the fire and, as a result, could not have possibly even survived. (Note that it would not be until a year and a half later from this point, in latter 1998, in which the Undertaker would shamelessly confess to intentional acts of arson to the funeral home that killed his parents and scarred his brother).

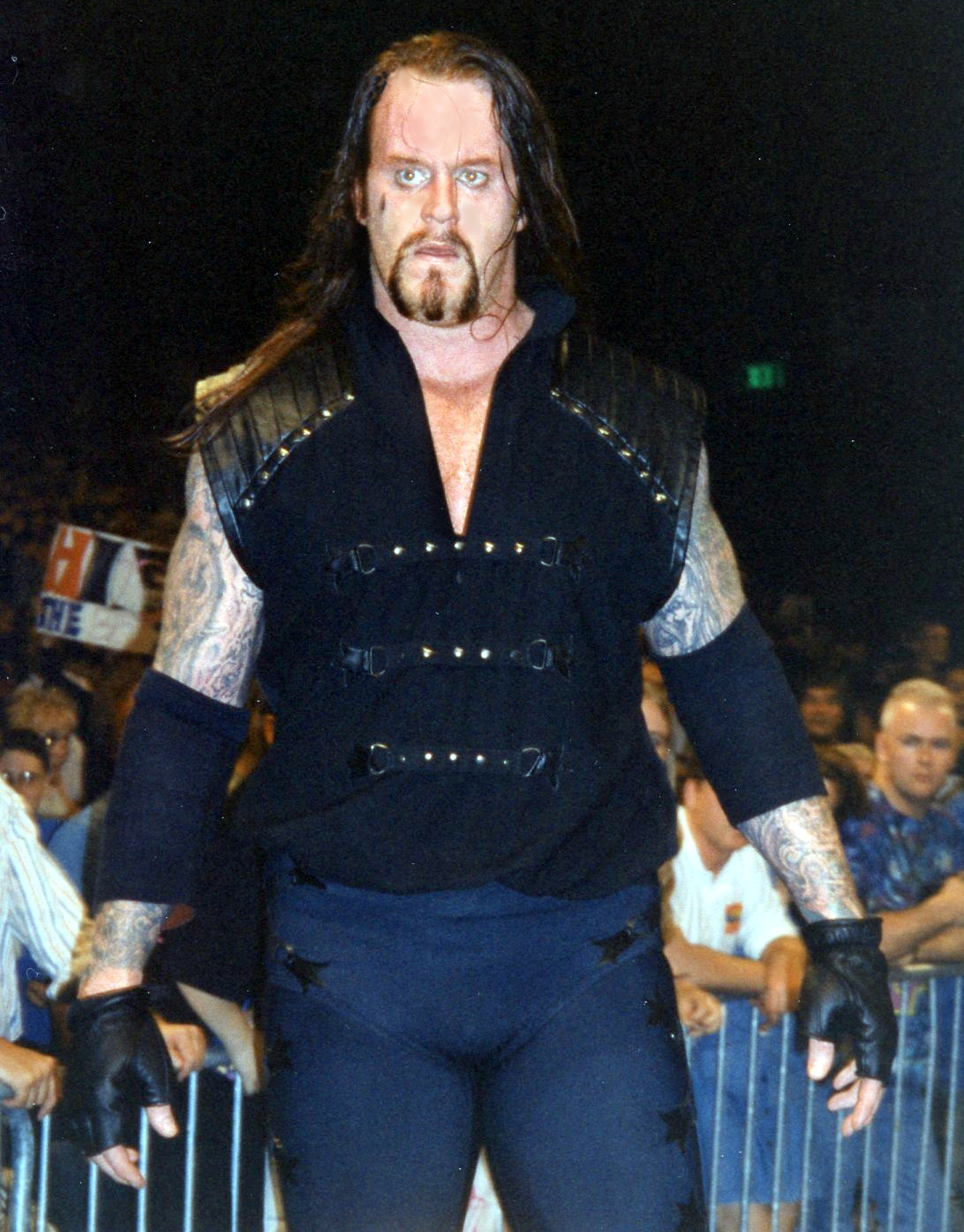
The Undertaker as "Lord of Darkness" Deadman in September 1997

In spite of Bearer projecting himself as a constant source of mental distress to the Undertaker during his Championship title reign, the Undertaker managed to secure successful title defenses against Stone Cold Steve Austin (A Cold Day In Hell: In Your House), Faarooq (King of the Ring) and Vader (Canadian Stampede: In Your House, revisiting and settling their Royal Rumble feud from earlier on in the year), respectively. Concurrent to the "deep, dark secret" storyline directed by Bearer, Undertaker began a then new rivalry at SummerSlam when special guest referee Shawn Michaels accidentally hit him with a steel chair shot intended for his archnemesis Bret Hart, in effect, costing the Undertaker the WWF Championship. The accidental chair shot led to Michaels feeling betrayed by the now booing WWF fans, and quickly becoming heel. Thus, a severely violent storyline with the Undertaker followed, one revolving around repeated intentional chair shots by Michaels on the Undertaker, Michaels taunting the Undertaker throughout. After the duo's first match, which was a chaotic and uncontrolled encounter that resulted in a double count-out draw at Ground Zero: In Your House, Undertaker challenged Michaels to the first ever Hell in a Cell match to take place at Badd Blood: In Your House. Despite the inclusion of the cell for more order and to prevent Michaels from receiving help from his D-Generation X stable, the encounter ended up even more uncontrolled and savage than their first and is considered one of the Undertaker's best matches of his career.

Seemingly about to emerge the victor after striking Michaels with a chair shot of his own, the Undertaker was interrupted by his storyline half-brother Kane, finally making his debut. Under the control of Paul Bearer, Kane stormed the arena, ripped off the cell door, and laid out a nonplussed Undertaker with his own trademarked finisher, The Tombstone Piledriver, allowing Michaels to pin him for the victory. As the storyline progressed through Bearer having Kane mow down much of the WWF roster, Kane repeatedly challenged the Undertaker, going to lengths of tormenting and humiliating him. However, the Undertaker consistently refused to fight his half-brother, claiming he had made a vow to his parents never to do harm to his own "flesh and blood". The Undertaker's final encounter with Michaels during this chapter of his career was in a casket match for the WWF Championship at the Royal Rumble. The week before on Raw, Kane had duplicitously presented as allying with his brother against Michaels's D-Generation X stable; however, at the Royal Rumble, Kane trapped the Undertaker in the coffin, padlocked the lid shut, and set the casket ablaze, allowing Michaels another victory. After a two-month hiatus in which Kane wreaked havoc over the WWF, the Undertaker returned on the March 2, 1998 episode of Raw in a most notable resurrection—his druids interrupting Kane and Bearer by presenting them with a coffin on the entrance stage amid a large number of bell tolls. The coffin was struck and dismantled by a lightning bolt, revealing a lied out Undertaker who sat up in a fury state and challenged Kane to do battle with him. At WrestleMania XIV in their first match, the Undertaker defeated Kane. Kane challenged Undertaker to a rematch—Kane's specialty and first ever Inferno match—that occurred one month later at Unforgiven: In Your House. The Undertaker won the encounter by setting Kane's right arm on fire.

The Undertaker and Mankind's wildly violent, outlandish feud from over a year previous to this point was revitalized over the next month, ultimately taken to a new graphic height and decisively resolved when they faced each other in a Hell in a Cell match at King of the Ring. The match became one of the most famous matches in professional wrestling history. During the match, the Undertaker threw Mankind off the roof of the 4.9 m (16 ft) cell onto a broadcast table below, in what was a preplanned move. He later performed a chokeslam on Mankind through the roof of the cell into the ring, which was not preplanned and legitimately knocked Mankind unconscious. In jumping from the top of the cell to the ring canvas, the Undertaker suffered a broken ankle. Escalating as things progressed, blood flowed from both wrestlers as they attacked each other with steel steps, chairs, the cell wall, etc. Topping that off, Mankind introduced multitudes of thumbtacks scattered across the ring canvas but was back body dropped on them, and subsequently chokeslammed onto them before the Undertaker won the match with his Tombstone Piledriver.

At Fully Loaded: In Your House, the Undertaker and Stone Cold Steve Austin defeated Kane and Mankind to win the WWF Tag Team Championship. the Undertaker and Austin's reign as tag team champions lasted only two weeks, as Kane and Mankind regained the titles from them in a fatal four-way tag-team match on the August 10 episode of Raw is War. The Undertaker then became the number one contender for the WWF Championship, held by Austin at that point, for a match at SummerSlam. Shortly before SummerSlam and after much speculation, the Undertaker finally disclosed that he and his half-brother were working together. Despite this revelation, the Undertaker told Kane before his SummerSlam bout that he did not want him interfering, even sending Kane away during the match itself when he appeared. Even though the Undertaker lost the match at SummerSlam, he handed Austin his championship belt back after the match with a show of respect and sportsmanship.

In September as the storyline matured however, the Undertaker subtly began showing some heel characteristics, becoming a tweener. This began when he and Kane revealed the fact that they were in cahoots to rid Austin of his title for villainous company owner Mr. McMahon—Austin and McMahon immersed in a bitter rivalry during this era. At Breakdown: In Your House, the Undertaker and Kane were booked in a triple threat match with Austin for the WWF Championship, in which McMahon stated that the brothers were not allowed to pin each other. The Undertaker and Kane pinned Austin simultaneously after a double chokeslam, ending the match in a no contest, so the title was vacated by McMahon. This event led to a match at Judgment Day: In Your House between the Undertaker and Kane for the title, with Austin as the special guest referee. Near the end of the match, Paul Bearer seemed about to assist Kane by handing him a steel chair to hit the Undertaker with, but as Kane had his back turned, both Bearer and the Undertaker hit Kane with chair shots. The Undertaker went for the pin, but Austin refused to count the fall, attacked the Undertaker and counted out both of them. Finally the next night on Raw is War, the Undertaker reconciled with Bearer and claimed that he and Bearer would unleash their "Ministry of Darkness" on the WWF, turning heel for the first time since 1992. As part of the then new storyline angle, the Undertaker admitted that he had indeed intentionally set the fire that killed his parents and scarred Kane, for which he had previously blamed on Kane.

==== Ministry of Darkness Deadman (1998–1999) ====
The Undertaker's "TX" crucifix-like logo

After Survivor Series, the Undertaker returned his attention to his previous feud with Austin for costing him the title at Judgment Day, hitting Austin in the head with a shovel during a title match with The Rock on the November 16 episode of Raw is War, returning the favor for what happened a month earlier. With this twist in the storyline, Mr. McMahon scheduled a Buried Alive match between the Undertaker and Austin at Rock Bottom: In Your House. In the weeks leading up to Rock Bottom, the Undertaker attempted to embalm Austin alive, tried to have Kane committed to a mental asylum, and had his druids chain Austin to an immense structure of his Undertaker crucifix-like logo (which took the appearance of a capital T combined X) before having that structure lifted up on high into the air. However, the Undertaker lost the Buried Alive match to Austin at Rock Bottom after Kane interfered.

After the buildup to his second heel run in the latter part of 1998, the Undertaker introduced an updated version of his Deadman identity by January 1999—a dark priest-like character who in the initial period of this persona reigned over a stable known as The Ministry of Darkness. In this form, he took on a wicked, demonic presence, much more so than ever before. He often proclaimed to be invoking and taking orders from a "Higher Power". Moreover, he often appeared in a hooded black robe and sat on a throne with a towering backrest specially designed into his crucifix-like logo. With the help of his minions, he often performed sacrifices on select WWF wrestlers, using various incantations and magic words with intent to extract out the dark side of the wrestlers in question to recruit them into his Ministry. The completed Ministry of Darkness consisted of The Brood (Christian, Edge and Gangrel), The Acolytes (Bradshaw and Faarooq), Mideon and Viscera. Calaway himself did not wrestle for a period, having undergone a hip replacement. As part of the angle, the Undertaker had his Ministry members fight his battles, carry out his evil wishes and do all his dirty deeds. In this manner, he expressed his desires to take over the World Wrestling Federation, displacing its owner, Mr. McMahon. These ambitions culminated into a rivalry between The Ministry and The Corporation, ultimately resulting in a match between the Undertaker and Corporation enforcer, Big Boss Man. The two faced off in a Hell in a Cell match at WrestleMania XV, which the Undertaker won. At Backlash, the Undertaker defeated Corporation member Ken Shamrock after interference from Ministry member Bradshaw.

Thereafter, the Undertaker kidnapped Stephanie McMahon, forcing Mr. McMahon to enter into a reluctant alliance with his longtime nemesis Stone Cold Steve Austin. The Undertaker attempted to marry Stephanie before sacrificing her in an eldritch ceremony conducted by Paul Bearer, but Austin was able to rescue her. At the Over the Edge pay-per-view, the Undertaker defeated Austin for his third WWF Championship with help from Shane McMahon, the special guest referee. The Ministry eventually merged with Shane McMahon's Corporation alliance to form The Corporate Ministry. The Undertaker later revealed that Mr. McMahon had been his "Higher Power" all along as a scheme against Austin. After the Undertaker lost the WWF Championship back to Austin on the Raw following King of the Ring and lost to him in a First Blood match at Fully Loaded, his relationship with the McMahons dissolved and The Corporate Ministry disbanded.

The Undertaker then began a storyline where he teamed with Big Show in a tag team known as "The Unholy Alliance", which held the WWF Tag Team Championship twice. After their victory at SummerSlam, the Undertaker suffered a groin tear and was seen limping in several matches. He avoided competing in wrestling matches in the following weeks, instead overbearingly ordering Big Show to fight his battles and do all his dirty deeds. Developing a comedy horror smart mouth during this time, elements of the Undertaker's trash-talking biker identity (that he would eventually introduce in 2000) began peeping out during this phase of his career. According to an interview with Kevin Nash, this was a move to allow Calaway to return to WCW with a non-trademarked persona; had he entered WCW, it would have been as Mark Calaway. According to Nash, although negotiations were described as close, Calaway ultimately re-signed with the WWF. Conversely, while on Steve Austin's Broken Skull Sessions podcast on November 22, 2020, Calaway revealed that there was no way he was ever going to rejoin WCW, that the gimmick's biker transition was just a matter of him mixing things up because he didn't feel the character's Deadman side properly fit with the then ongoing Attitude Era.

To compensate for his lack of physical activity, the Undertaker became increasingly overbearing and vocal, often mouthing off with a weirdness and making sinisterly smart-aleck remarks in promos and on commentary. On the September 23, 1999, episode of SmackDown!, Mr. McMahon threatened that he would remove the Undertaker from the Unforgiven main event if he refused to participate in a casket match against Triple H. The Undertaker retorted that he did not care and maybe he would not be participating in anything WWF any longer, from there walking out on the WWF. In reality, Calaway went on a hiatus from the WWF in order to treat his groin injury. The Undertaker was advertised on the Armageddon promotional poster to return, but meanwhile also tore his pectoral muscle, taking him out of action for almost eight months.

==== American Badass (2000–2001) ====
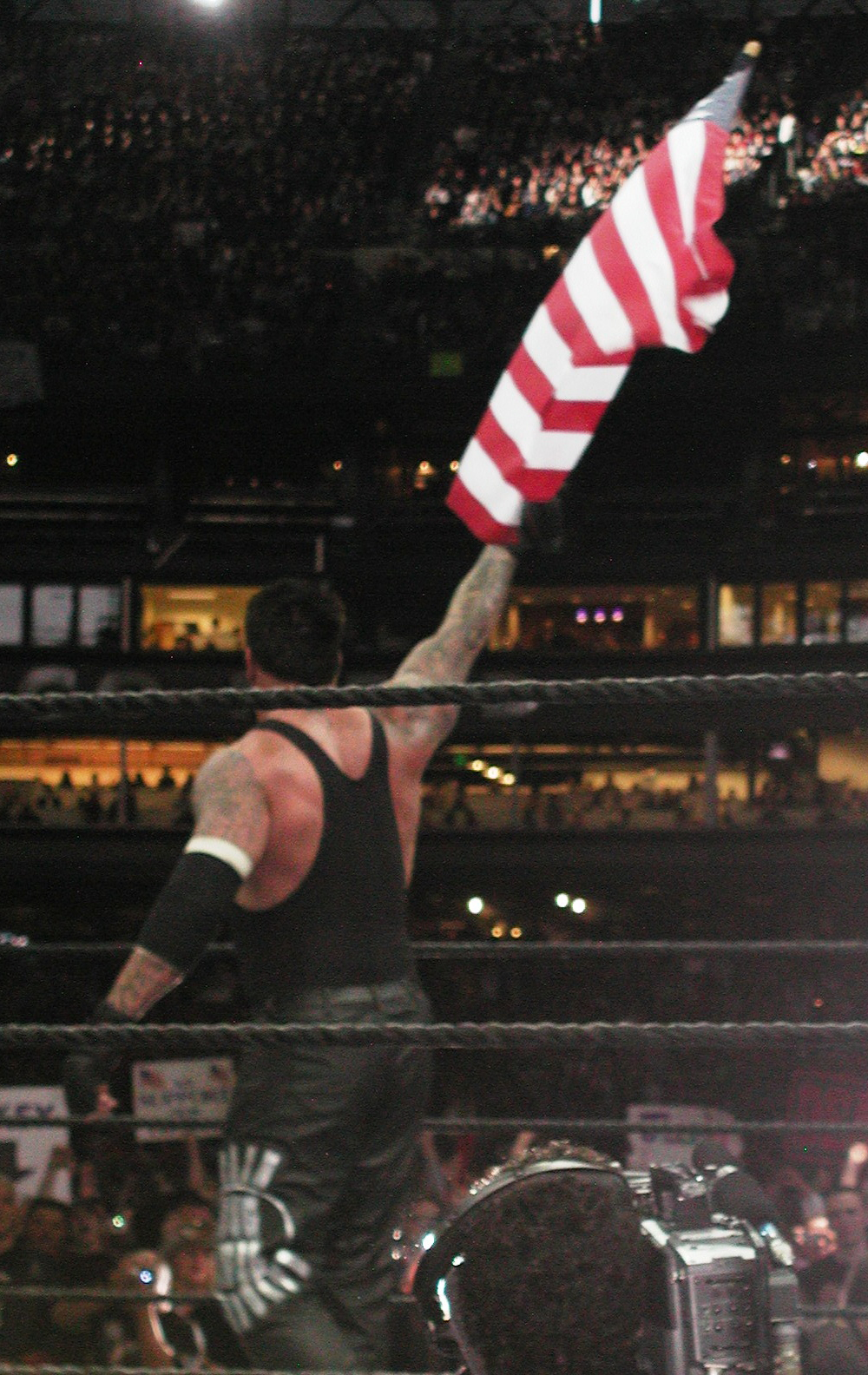
The Undertaker at WrestleMania XIX

In May 2000, Calaway expanded on the Undertaker gimmick, returning under a human alter ego of the gimmick—a smack-talking, redneck biker, dubbed "The American Badass", known for motorcycle-riding, tobacco chewing/spitting, and donning a sporty appearance and manner. In stark contrast to his horror-themed and fully fictional Deadman persona, Calaway's Badass persona was only semifictional with traits and features adopted from who he is out of character—hence, why he desired to transform the Undertaker. While explained off screen years later for the above reasons, Calaway's sudden appearance as American Badass Undertaker after hiatus in which he left off as Deadman Undertaker was never explained within WWE storylines or the WWE's fictional universe. Rather, the expectation was for fans to just go with it.

When the Undertaker returned near the end of the iron man match for the WWF Championship between Triple H and The Rock at Judgment Day on May 21, 2000, he took out all the members of the McMahon-Helmsley Faction, which created for a face turn after having left things off as a heel before his hiatus. He also targeted their leader, then WWF Champion Triple H. At the King of the Ring pay-per-view on June 25, the Undertaker teamed with The Rock and Kane to defeat the team of Triple H, Shane McMahon and Vince McMahon. Afterward, he was booked to team with Kane to contend for the WWF Tag Team Championship. They defeated Edge and Christian, earning the right to face them the following week for the championship, which Edge and Christian retained. During an August 14 Raw is War bout against Chris Benoit, Kane became involved and betrayed the Undertaker by hitting him with two chokeslams, the second one causing the ring apron to cave in underneath the Undertaker. This incident led to another match between the two at SummerSlam on August 27, which ended in a no contest as Kane fled from the ring area after the Undertaker removed Kane's mask.

The Undertaker then challenged Kurt Angle for the WWF Championship at Survivor Series on November 19. Angle, however, defeated the Undertaker after he switched places with his real-life brother, Eric Angle. The Undertaker demanded and was awarded a spot in the six-man Hell in a Cell match for the WWF Championship at Armageddon on December 10. The Undertaker promised to make someone famous and did so when he performed a chokeslam on Rikishi from the roof of the cell into hay-filled cargo bed of a truck.

The Undertaker reunited with Kane as the Brothers of Destruction, issuing a challenge for the WWF Tag Team Championship once again. They received a title shot at No Way Out on February 25, 2001, facing Edge and Christian and then champions The Dudley Boyz in a tables match but were unsuccessful. The Undertaker then went on to defeat Triple H at WrestleMania X-Seven on April 1. He and Kane continued a storyline that focused on Triple H, who formed a "surprise alliance" with then WWF Champion Stone Cold Steve Austin. The Brothers of Destruction were granted an opportunity to face Triple H and Austin for their titles (Triple H was the WWF Intercontinental Champion). After the Undertaker and Kane won the WWF Tag Team Championship from Edge and Christian on the April 19 episode of SmackDown!, Triple H pinned Kane after attacking him with a sledgehammer at Backlash on April 29, where the Brothers of Destruction lost their championships. With Kane injured, the Undertaker feuded briefly with Austin for his WWF Championship, but he failed to win the title at Judgment Day on May 20.

As part of "The Invasion" storyline, the Undertaker's next nemesis was Diamond Dallas Page, who was obsessively stalking The Undertaker's wife, Sara. At SummerSlam on August 19, WCW Tag Team Champions the Undertaker and Kane defeated Page and his partner Kanyon in a steel cage match to win the WWF Tag Team Championship. At Survivor Series on November 18, the Undertaker teamed with Kane, The Rock, Chris Jericho and Big Show to take on The Alliance's Stone Cold Steve Austin, Booker T, Rob Van Dam, Shane McMahon and Kurt Angle (this was the last time the Undertaker and Kane teamed until 2006). Angle pinned the Undertaker due to interference by Austin. Despite this, Team WWF won the match.

==== Big Evil (2001–2003) ====
After The Alliance was defeated, the Undertaker inducted commentator Jim Ross into the Mr. McMahon: Kiss My Ass Club on the November 26 episode of Raw, which involved the Undertaker pressing the lips of Ross against McMahon's exposed buttocks, turning heel in the process. In transitioning his "American Badass" biker identity into a heel, the Undertaker eventually cut his long hair short and went by the nickname "Big Evil". At Vengeance on December 9, the Undertaker defeated Rob Van Dam to win the WWF Hardcore Championship.

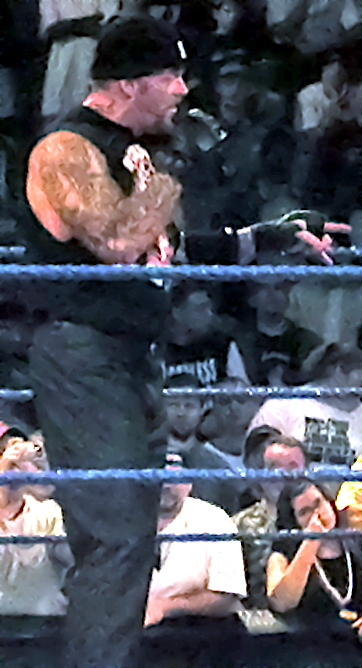
The Undertaker in his "Big Evil" persona

The Undertaker's next storyline began at the Royal Rumble on January 20, 2002, when Maven eliminated him from the Royal Rumble match by hitting him with a dropkick from behind. Subsequently, the Undertaker eliminated Maven in return and brutally assaulted him backstage. Thereafter, on an episode of SmackDown!, The Rock angered the Undertaker by mentioning his elimination at the Royal Rumble. He responded by costing The Rock the number one contendership for the Undisputed WWF Championship. The storyline continued when The Rock cost the Undertaker the WWF Hardcore Championship against Maven on the February 7 episode of SmackDown!. The two faced off at No Way Out on February 17, where the Undertaker lost due to interference from Ric Flair. This interference began a storyline with Flair, who declined a challenge to wrestle the Undertaker at WrestleMania X8 on March 17. As a result, the Undertaker assaulted Flair's son David Flair. Flair eventually accepted the match after the Undertaker threatened to inflict the same punishment on Flair's daughter. A no-disqualification stipulation was added to the match and the Undertaker defeated Flair at WrestleMania.

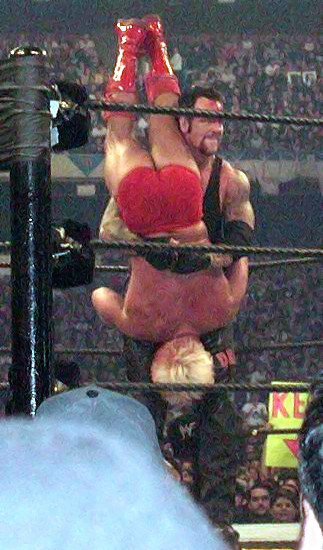
The Undertaker performing a Tombstone Piledriver on Ric Flair at WrestleMania X8

After the storyline with Flair, the Undertaker was drafted to the Raw brand after the WWF split its roster into two brands and defeated Stone Cold Steve Austin at Backlash on April 21 to become the number one contender for the Undisputed WWF Championship. Later that night, he helped Hollywood Hulk Hogan win the title against then champion Triple H. The Undertaker then defeated Hogan for the renamed WWE Undisputed Championship at Judgment Day on May 19. The next night on Raw, the Undertaker seemingly lost the WWE Undisputed Championship to Rob Van Dam; however, Raw owner Ric Flair restarted the match (Van Dam pinned the Undertaker when his foot was on the rope, thus invalidating the pin attempt) and the Undertaker defeated Van Dam to retain the championship.

On the July 1 episode of Raw, the Undertaker defeated Jeff Hardy in a ladder match to retain the WWE Undisputed Championship and raised Hardy's hand as a show of respect, turning face once again. The Undertaker, however, lost the title at Vengeance on July 21 to The Rock in a triple threat match that also involved Kurt Angle. On the August 29 episode of SmackDown!, the Undertaker moved to the SmackDown! brand (where he remained until the first brand extension ended in 2011), and defeated Chris Benoit and Kurt Angle in a triple threat match to become the number-one contender for the renamed WWE Championship and challenged Brock Lesnar for the title at Unforgiven on September 22 that ended in a double disqualification. Their feud carried over to No Mercy on October 20 in a Hell in a Cell match, which the Undertaker performed with a legitimately broken hand and ultimately lost to Lesnar.

The Undertaker took a break after Big Show threw him off the stage on the October 24 episode of SmackDown!, sparking a feud. The Undertaker returned at the Royal Rumble on January 19, 2003. He immediately continued his feud with Big Show and defeated him by submission at No Way Out on February 23 with a triangle choke. A-Train entered the storyline by attempting to attack the Undertaker after the match, but Nathan Jones came to his aid. The storyline resumed as the Undertaker began to train Jones to wrestle and the two were scheduled to fight Big Show and A-Train in a tag team match at WrestleMania XIX on March 30. However, Jones was removed before the match, making it a handicap match, which the Undertaker won with the help of Jones.

Over the remainder of the year, the Undertaker entered a brief feud with John Cena (defeating him at Vengeance on July 27) and was booked to have two WWE Championship opportunities. The first, on the September 4 SmackDown!, against Kurt Angle, ended in a no contest, due to interference from Brock Lesnar. The second, at No Mercy on October 19, was a Biker Chain match between the Undertaker and Lesnar, which Lesnar won with the help of Mr. McMahon. This match resulted in a feud with McMahon, culminating at Survivor Series on November 16 where the Undertaker lost a Buried Alive match against McMahon when Kane interfered. The Undertaker disappeared for some time following this match, with Kane claiming that he was "dead and buried forever".

==== Return of the Deadman (2004–2007) ====
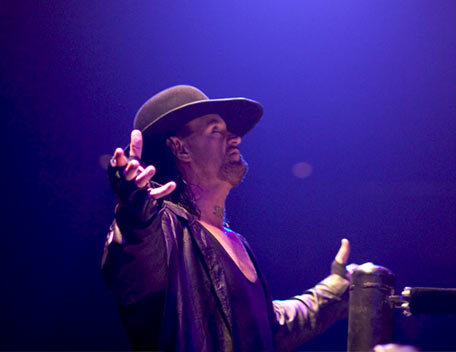
The Undertaker, awakening the arena lights as he enters the ring

In the storyline leading up to WrestleMania XX on March 14, 2004, Kane was tormented by horror-themed mind games, paranormal activities, and spooking vignettes proclaiming the Undertaker's Deadman return. The first was during the Royal Rumble when the Undertaker's bells tolled, distracting Kane and allowing Booker T to eliminate him. Accompanied by Paul Bearer at WrestleMania XX, the Undertaker resurrected his Deadman identity, defeating Kane in a singles match. Introduced was a more dramatic, theatrical and supernatural Deadman than in years past, his presence, mannerisms, and entrances significantly elaborated on as well, such as with more intensity, special effects and rising and falling flames. At the same time, the Undertaker maintained elements of his American Badass identity, thus a composite character more humanized than all of his previous Deadman incarnations (the Undertaker would present in this particular hybrid Deadman form until No Mercy 2005 when Randy Orton sealed him in a casket and set it on fire). At Judgment Day on May 16, the Undertaker defeated Booker T. One week later, Paul Heyman ordered The Dudley Boyz to kidnap Bearer. Thus, Heyman "took control" of Undertaker. At The Great American Bash on June 27, the Undertaker fought a handicap match against The Dudley Boyz, with the stipulation that if he did not lay down and purposely lose, Heyman would bury Paul Bearer in cement. The Undertaker won and stopped Heyman from burying Bearer, but after claiming Bearer was merely a liability he had no use for, buried him himself.

The Undertaker began a feud with then WWE Champion John "Bradshaw" Layfield (JBL) by challenging him to a title match at SummerSlam on August 15, which the Undertaker lost by disqualification. At No Mercy on October 3, the Undertaker and JBL competed in the first-ever Last Ride match for the WWE Championship, although the Undertaker lost after Heidenreich interfered. After defeating Heidenreich in a match at Survivor Series on November 14, the Undertaker turned his focus to the WWE Championship once again. Along with Eddie Guerrero and Booker T, he challenged JBL to a championship rematch at Armageddon on December 12 in a fatal four-way match, in which the Undertaker was unsuccessful, again due to Heidenreich's interference. The feud culminated in a casket match between the Undertaker and Heidenreich at the Royal Rumble on January 30, 2005, where the Undertaker sealed Heidenreich in a casket for the victory.

Soon after, Randy Orton challenged the Undertaker to a match at WrestleMania 21 on April 3, uppishly proclaiming that he would end his WrestleMania winning Streak. Even with help from his father, Orton lost as the Undertaker improved his WrestleMania record to 13–0. After a two-month hiatus, the Undertaker returned on the June 16 episode of SmackDown!, but lost to JBL due to interference from Randy Orton, who was drafted to SmackDown! as part of the draft lottery. The Undertaker's feud with Orton would be temporarily paused due to Orton taking a hiatus to recover from a shoulder injury.

In the meantime, the Undertaker began a feud with Muhammad Hassan. In one of the most controversial angles in WWE history, the Undertaker defeated Hassan's manager Daivari on the July 7 episode of SmackDown!, after which Hassan began to "pray" on the ramp, summoning five masked men, dressed in black shirts, ski-masks and camouflage pants, who assaulted and choked out the Undertaker with piano wire before Hassan then placed the Undertaker in a camel clutch. Afterward, the masked men lifted Daivari above their heads and carried him away. Although the episode was pre-taped, the date it aired happened to be the same day as the London bombings of July 7, 2005, carried out by Islamist terrorists. The footage aired unedited on UPN in the United States and on The Score in Canada with an advisory warning shown several times during the broadcast, but removed from the Australian and European broadcasts. The angle elicited national attention in the New York Post, TV Guide, Variety and other major media outlets. The negative media coverage led to UPN banning the Muhammad Hassan character from being featured on their network.

The Undertaker defeated Hassan at The Great American Bash on July 24, and afterwards delivered a Last Ride through an open stage ramp onto a concrete floor to Hassan, giving Hassan kayfabe serious injuries and writing him off television. Hassan was originally due to have defeated the Undertaker at the pay-per-view, and receive a major push by going on to win the World Heavyweight Championship from Batista at SummerSlam on August 21 and becoming the youngest World Heavyweight Champion in WWE history.

On the following episode of SmackDown!, the Undertaker lost to JBL in a number-one contender's match, once again due to interference from Orton, reviving their feud that was put on hiatus. At SummerSlam, Orton defeated the Undertaker in a WrestleMania rematch. The storyline intensified as the two tried to get into the head of one another with dark mind game tactics and use of caskets, leading to a handicap casket match at No Mercy on October 9, in which the Undertaker lost to Randy and his father "Cowboy" Bob Orton. After the match, the Ortons poured gasoline on the casket and set it on fire (a throwback moment to one of the Undertaker's most infamous attacks received and done by Kane doing the same to him at the 1998 Royal Rumble). When the charred casket was opened, however, the Undertaker was absent, presented as having vanished.

The Undertaker resurrected at the Survivor Series on November 27 when the druids delivered a casket that was struck by lightning and went up in flames. The Undertaker then burst from the flaming casket in rage, battering and brutalizing an entire ring full of wrestlers as a message to Orton. Here, he reappeared still in hybrid form but with lessened Badass characteristics, eliminating several elements of his biker identity so that his Deadman side projected, most notably, replacing loose-fitting cargo pants with his Deadman spandex, and less use of the Last Ride finisher. At Armageddon on December 18, the Undertaker defeated Orton in a Hell in a Cell match to end the rivalry.

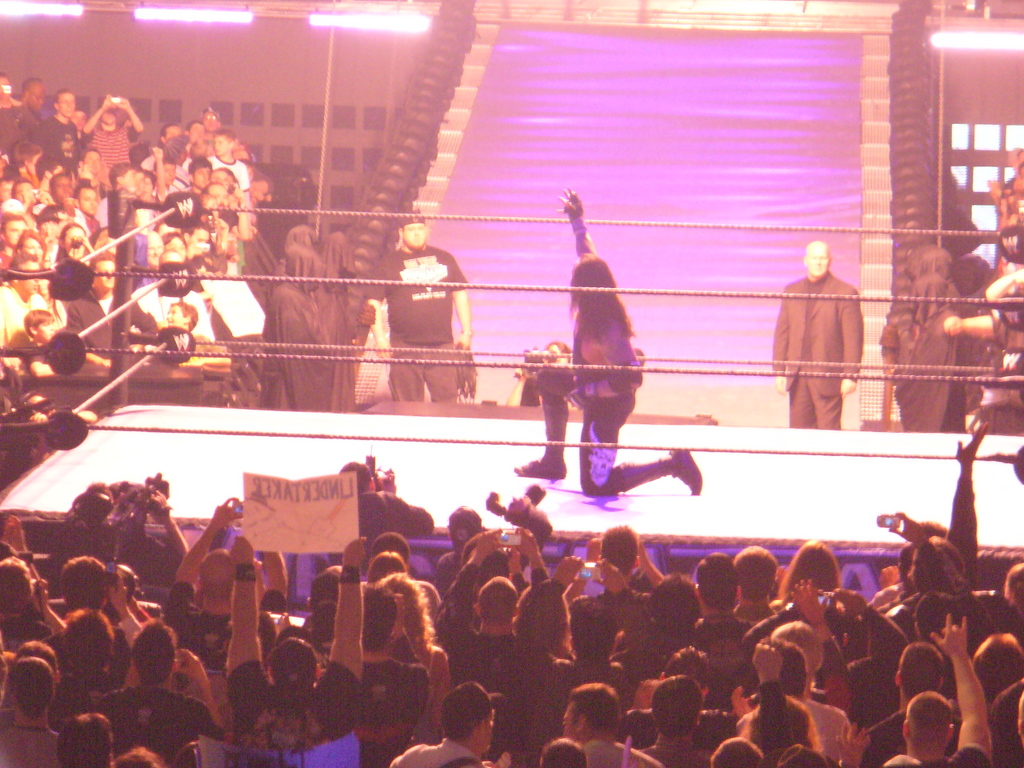
The Undertaker retaining his undefeated Streak at WrestleMania 22

At the Royal Rumble on January 29, 2006, the Undertaker returned on a horse-drawn cart during Kurt Angle's celebration of his World Heavyweight Championship defense against Mark Henry. In this appearance, the Undertaker signaled for a title shot by using his supernatural powers to collapse the wrestling ring that Angle stood in as a means to spook him. As part of their storyline angle, the Undertaker lost his match with Angle at No Way Out on February 19 after a 30-minute bout—described as underrated and among the Undertaker's top matches, in which he versatilely took to a more ground-based submission style to combat Angle's trademarked freestyle wrestling. The Undertaker cornered Angle after the match and told him he was not finished with him. In a rematch with Angle (similarly described as underrated and among the Undertaker's top matches that utilized the wrestling styles of their previous encounter on the March 3 episode of SmackDown!) Henry attacked the Undertaker from behind, costing him the title. This led to the Undertaker challenging Henry to a casket match at WrestleMania 22 on April 2 and Henry vowing to end the Undertaker's WrestleMania winning Streak. The match resulted in the Undertaker sealing Henry in the casket, winning the match and extending his streak to 14–0 at WrestleMania. During a rematch on the next episode of SmackDown!, the Undertaker was assaulted by the debuting Great Khali.

The Undertaker was not heard from until the May 5 episode of SmackDown! when Theodore Long delivered a challenge from the Undertaker to Khali for a match at Judgment Day on May 21. The Undertaker lost to Khali at Judgment Day. Khali was then challenged by the Undertaker to a Last Man Standing Match for SummerSlam on August 20 after interfering in the Undertaker's match with then World Heavyweight Champion King Booker. Khali refused the challenge but Long scheduled the Last Man Standing Match ahead of time, for the August 18 episode of SmackDown! instead. The Undertaker won the match by striking Khali with steel stairs and finishing him with a chokeslam. It was Khali's first defeat and effectively ended his feud with the Undertaker.

On the November 3 episode of SmackDown!, the Undertaker reunited with Kane to reform the Brothers of Destruction for the first time in five years, defeating reluctant opposition in the form of Mr. Kennedy and Montel Vontavious Porter (MVP), with whom Kane was feuding with at the time. As part of the storyline, Kennedy defeated the Undertaker in a First Blood match at Survivor Series on November 26 after interference from MVP, but finally defeated Kennedy in a Last Ride match at Armageddon on December 17. The two continued to feud as Kennedy cost the Undertaker two World Heavyweight Championship opportunities for a championship match at the Royal Rumble on January 28, 2007. However, the Undertaker eventually qualified for the Royal Rumble match, by winning a battle royal on the January 26 episode of SmackDown!.

==== World Heavyweight Champion (2007–2010) ====
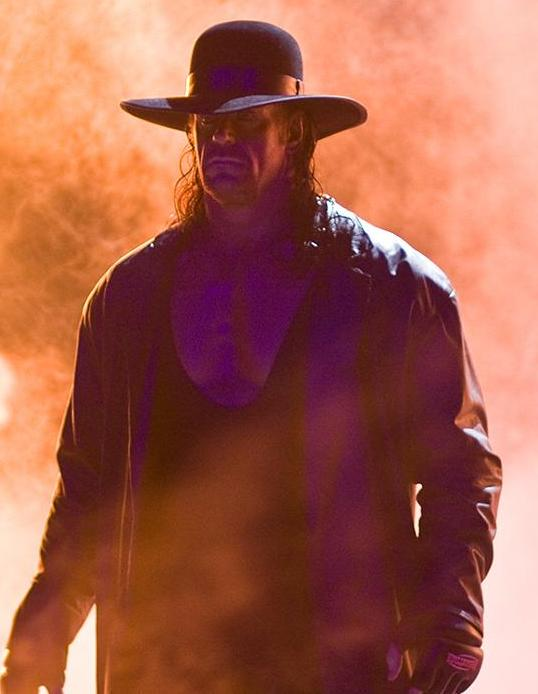
The Undertaker making his entrance in 2008

The Undertaker won his first Royal Rumble match on January 28, in doing so becoming the first man to enter the Rumble at number 30 and win the match, after lastly eliminating Shawn Michaels. On the February 5 episode of Raw, the Undertaker elected to face World Heavyweight Champion Batista at WrestleMania 23 on April 1, before attacking him with the chokeslam. At No Way Out on February 18, the Undertaker and Batista reluctantly teamed together to face John Cena and Shawn Michaels, but lost after Batista gained revenge on the Undertaker by hitting him with a spinebuster, allowing Cena to pin him. At WrestleMania 23, the Undertaker defeated Batista to win his first World Heavyweight Championship and extend his Streak to 15–0.

The Undertaker and Batista then fought once again in a steel cage match on the May 11 episode of SmackDown! that also ended in a draw when both men's feet touched the floor at the same time. After the match, Mark Henry made his return by assaulting an already battered the Undertaker, after which Edge ran to the ring and cashed in his Money in the Bank briefcase, forcing the Undertaker into a second title defense. Although he kicked out of two quick pin attempts, the Undertaker was pinned by Edge after two spears and lost the World Heavyweight Championship. After this match, the Undertaker took time off due to a torn right biceps.

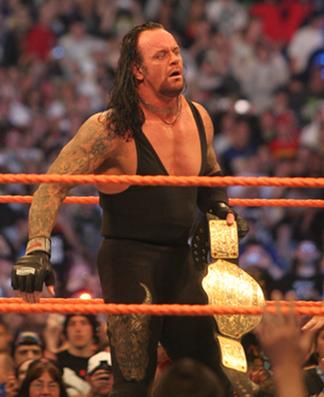
The Undertaker after he defeated Edge at WrestleMania XXIV

Batista and the Undertaker reignited their feud at Cyber Sunday on October 28 with the fans choosing the special guest referee to be Stone Cold Steve Austin, however, Batista retained the World Heavyweight Championship. They battled again in a Hell in a Cell match at Survivor Series on November 18, where Edge returned and interfered to help Batista retain the World Heavyweight Championship. In response to this, the Undertaker delivered a Tombstone Piledriver to General Manager Vickie Guerrero on the November 23 episode of SmackDown!, sending her to the hospital. Returning assistant-General Manager Theodore Long declared a triple threat match for the title between the three men at Armageddon on December 16, which Edge won after interference from The Major Brothers.

At the Royal Rumble on January 27, 2008, the Undertaker competed in the Royal Rumble match itself, entering at number 1, but eliminated by Shawn Michaels after lasting for most of the bout. At No Way Out on February 17, the Undertaker defeated Batista, Finlay, The Great Khali, MVP and Big Daddy V in the SmackDown Elimination Chamber match to become the number one contender for Edge's World Heavyweight Championship at WrestleMania XXIV on March 30. At WrestleMania, the Undertaker defeated Edge with the Hell's Gate submission hold to win his second World Heavyweight Championship in what was his 16th WrestleMania win. In a WrestleMania rematch, the Undertaker defeated Edge once again at Backlash on April 27 to retain the World Heavyweight Championship. Vickie Guerrero then banned the Undertaker's Hell's Gate submission hold and stripped him of the World Heavyweight Championship on the May 2 episode of SmackDown. The Undertaker battled Edge for the vacant title at Judgment Day on May 18, which he won by countout. Guerrero ordered that the title remain vacant, because titles could not change hands in this way. Edge and the Undertaker faced each other again for the vacant championship at One Night Stand on June 1 in a Tables, Ladders, and Chairs match, which the Undertaker lost after interference from La Familia. As a result of the stipulation, the Undertaker was forced to leave WWE.

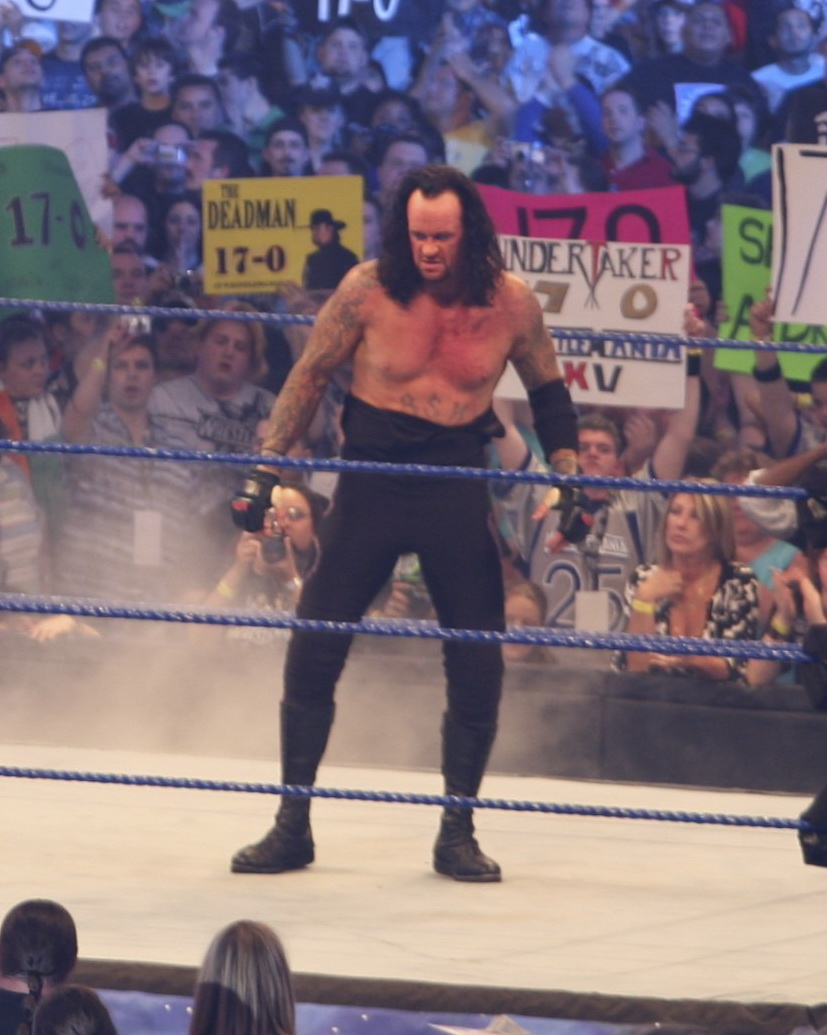
The Undertaker, after defeating Shawn Michaels at WrestleMania 25

In early 2009, the Undertaker began a second chapter to his unresolved feud with Shawn Michaels from the late 1990s, over a decade prior to this point (their tensions gradually increasing in the years immediately preceding this from heated run-ins at the 2007 and 2008 Royal Rumble matches). Their renewed feud by this point was two-dimensional, in part focusing on the wonder of the Undertaker's undefeated WrestleMania Streak in relation to, however, the fact that he had never before defeated Michaels in a singles match, only vice versa. Michaels also made the buildup to their WrestleMania encounter personal, repeatedly demonstrating his Christian objections to the demonic dark side nature of the Undertaker's Deadman gimmick, even creating his own heaven-esque bright side spin-off of what he felt the Undertaker's gimmick should be (Michaels having become a real-life born again Christian by this point in his career). The feud culminated in a singles match between the two at WrestleMania 25 on April 5 in which Michaels made a heaven-sent entrance descending from up on high portraying his bright side anti-Deadman, while the Undertaker made a grave-risen entrance emerging from the ground. After what was widely described as a suspenseful, competitive match, the Undertaker defeated Michaels, thus extending his WrestleMania winning streak to 17–0. Their encounter was highly acclaimed by critics and audiences alike and is considered by many to be one of the greatest WrestleMania matches of all time.

After a four-month hiatus, the Undertaker returned at SummerSlam on August 23 by attacking CM Punk, who had just won the World Heavyweight Championship from Jeff Hardy in a Tables, Ladders, and Chairs match. At Breaking Point on September 13, the Undertaker faced Punk in a submission match for the World Heavyweight Championship. The Undertaker had originally won the match with his Hell's Gate submission hold, but the match was restarted by SmackDown General Manager Theodore Long, who ruled that the ban placed on the move by Vickie Guerrero was still in effect. Punk went on to win the match with his anaconda vise when referee Scott Armstrong called for the bell, despite the Undertaker never submitting—a recreation of the Montreal Screwjob, which took place in the same venue in 1997. On the September 25 episode of SmackDown, Theodore Long officially lifted the ban after being released from a casket that the Undertaker had him placed inside of, among a series of other horror-themed mind game tactics. With Long out of the way, the feud between the Undertaker and Punk pressed on and at Hell in a Cell on October 4, the Undertaker won the World Heavyweight Championship from him in a Hell in a Cell match.

The Undertaker successfully defended the title against CM Punk on the October 23 episode of SmackDown, in a fatal four-way match at Bragging Rights on October 25 against Punk, Batista and Rey Mysterio and in a triple threat match against Chris Jericho and Big Show at Survivor Series on November 22. He faced Batista at TLC: Tables, Ladders & Chairs on December 13 in a chairs match for the championship and won when the match was restarted by Long, after Batista had originally won after utilizing a low blow. The next night on Raw, the Undertaker competed in a tournament to crown the 2009 Superstar of the Year, losing to Randy Orton by countout in the first round after a distraction by Orton's protegès Cody Rhodes and Ted DiBiase.

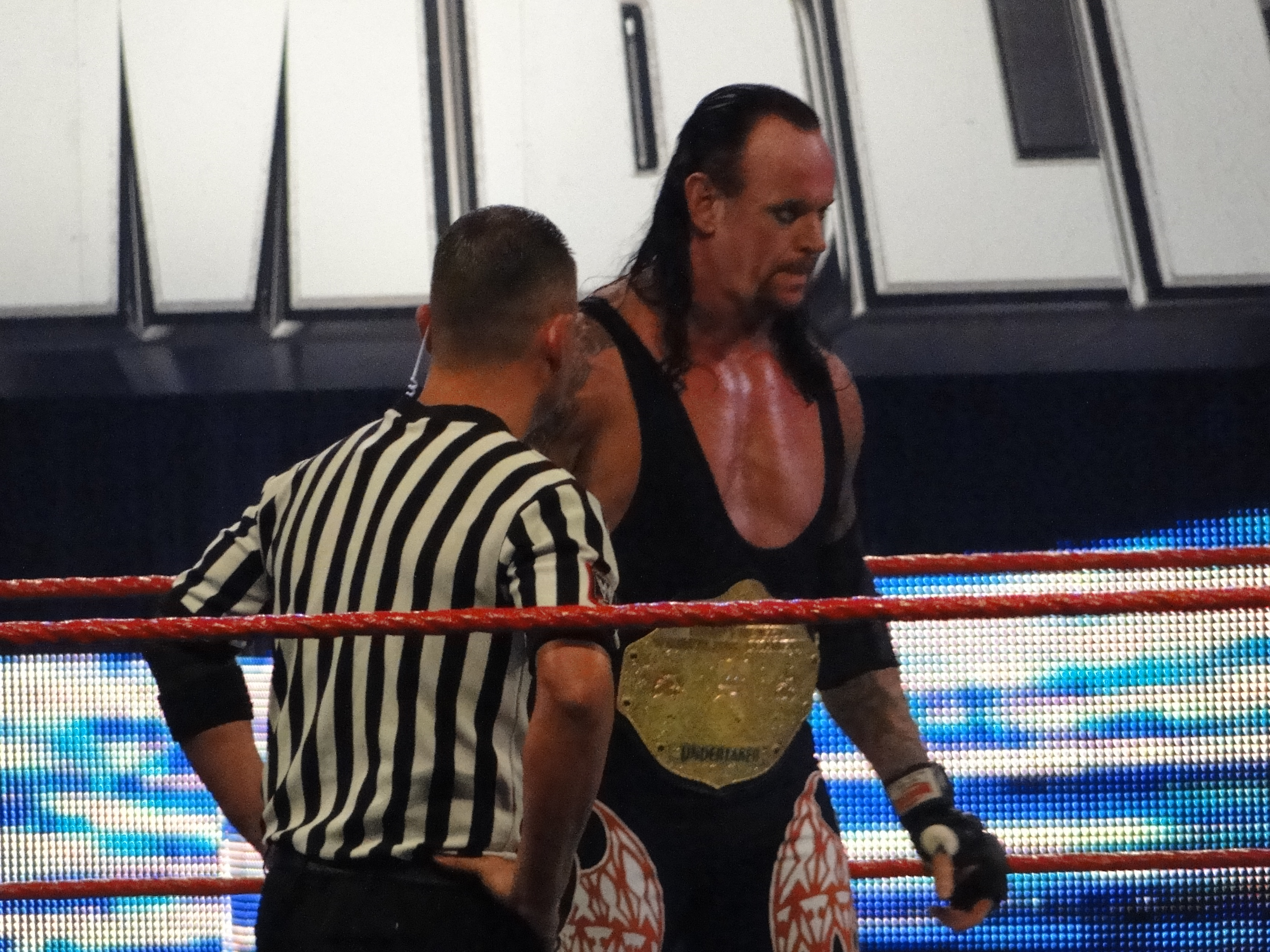
The Undertaker defending the World Heavyweight title at the Royal Rumble in January 2010

After successfully defending the World Heavyweight Championship against Rey Mysterio at the Royal Rumble on January 31, 2010, The Undertaker lost the championship at the Elimination Chamber pay-per-view on February 21. It was also at this event that a notorious shoot incident (non-kayfabe) befell the Undertaker: a pyrotechnics malfunction momentarily engulfed him in flames up to three times during his ring entrance. He was, however, able to continue with his scheduled match that night despite suffering first and second-degree burns on his chest and neck. According to a WWE spokesman, it "looked like a bad sunburn". The Undertaker lost the title to Chris Jericho after interference from Shawn Michaels that night; Jericho has said on multiple occasions that the pyrotechnician responsible for the accident was immediately escorted from the arena and relieved of his employment with WWE, following a threat of violence from Calaway. Calaway himself explained that he had previously expressed concerns to the technician regarding the pyro arrangement, but was ignored. He feels he was saved from severe injury by applying water to his hair, and altering his attire from a sleeveless to a sleeved jacket, just minutes before the accident.

The Undertaker then accepted Michaels's rematch offer, after initially declining, at WrestleMania XXVI on March 28 in a Streak vs. Career match, where the Undertaker was victorious and Shawn Michaels was forced to retire. This match also made both the Undertaker and Michaels the first men in WWE history to main event WrestleMania in three different decades (Undertaker main evented WrestleMania 13 and XXIV in 1997 and 2008 and Michaels main evented WrestleMania XII and XIV in 1996 and 1998 and XX and 23 in 2004 and 2007, respectively). After a hiatus (which included wrestling two matches on Raw), he returned to SmackDown on May 28, defeating Rey Mysterio to qualify for a spot at the Fatal 4-Way pay-per-view on June 20 to compete for the World Heavyweight title. During the Rey Mysterio match, the Undertaker suffered a concussion, broken orbital bone and broken nose; he was visibly bleeding profusely on camera by the end of this match. To cover for the injury, Kane revealed that the Undertaker had been found in a vegetative state on the June 4 episode of SmackDown; Mysterio took his place in the match and won the World Heavyweight Championship. While attempting to learn which wrestler had attacked the Undertaker, Kane defeated Mysterio to win the World Heavyweight Championship at Money in the Bank. Kane and Mysterio continued to clash as they accused one another of being the assailant behind the mysterious ambush of the Undertaker.

At SummerSlam on August 15, the Undertaker returned to confront Kane and Rey Mysterio, only to be attacked with a Tombstone Piledriver by Kane. With Kane revealed as his attacker, the two feuded for the next few months over the World Heavyweight Championship. After losing to Kane in a No Holds Barred match at Night of Champions on September 19, Paul Bearer returned as the Undertaker's manager on the September 24 episode of SmackDown. However, Bearer turned on him at Hell in a Cell on October 3 to help Kane win once again in a Hell in a Cell match. The feud ended at Bragging Rights on October 24 when The Nexus helped Kane defeat the Undertaker in a Buried Alive match (the half-brothers' final singles match against one another). The Undertaker needed surgery for a torn rotator cuff, causing him to be written off.

==== Final years of The Streak (2011–2014) ====
After the 2011 Royal Rumble, promotional videos began airing, showing the Undertaker entering and standing within a Western-style, dilapidated shack on a rainy desert in Death Valley, The birthplace. Each promo ended with the date 2–21–11 being "burned into" the screen. On the February 21 episode of Raw, the Undertaker returned, but before he could speak, Triple H also returned and confronted him. The two challenged each other to a match at WrestleMania XXVII, which was later made a No Holds Barred match and which the Undertaker won by submission. However, he had to be carried away from the ring on a stretcher. Following WrestleMania XXVII in 2011, the Undertaker would take on a more part-time role within the company; he would not have another match on Raw or SmackDown until 2013.

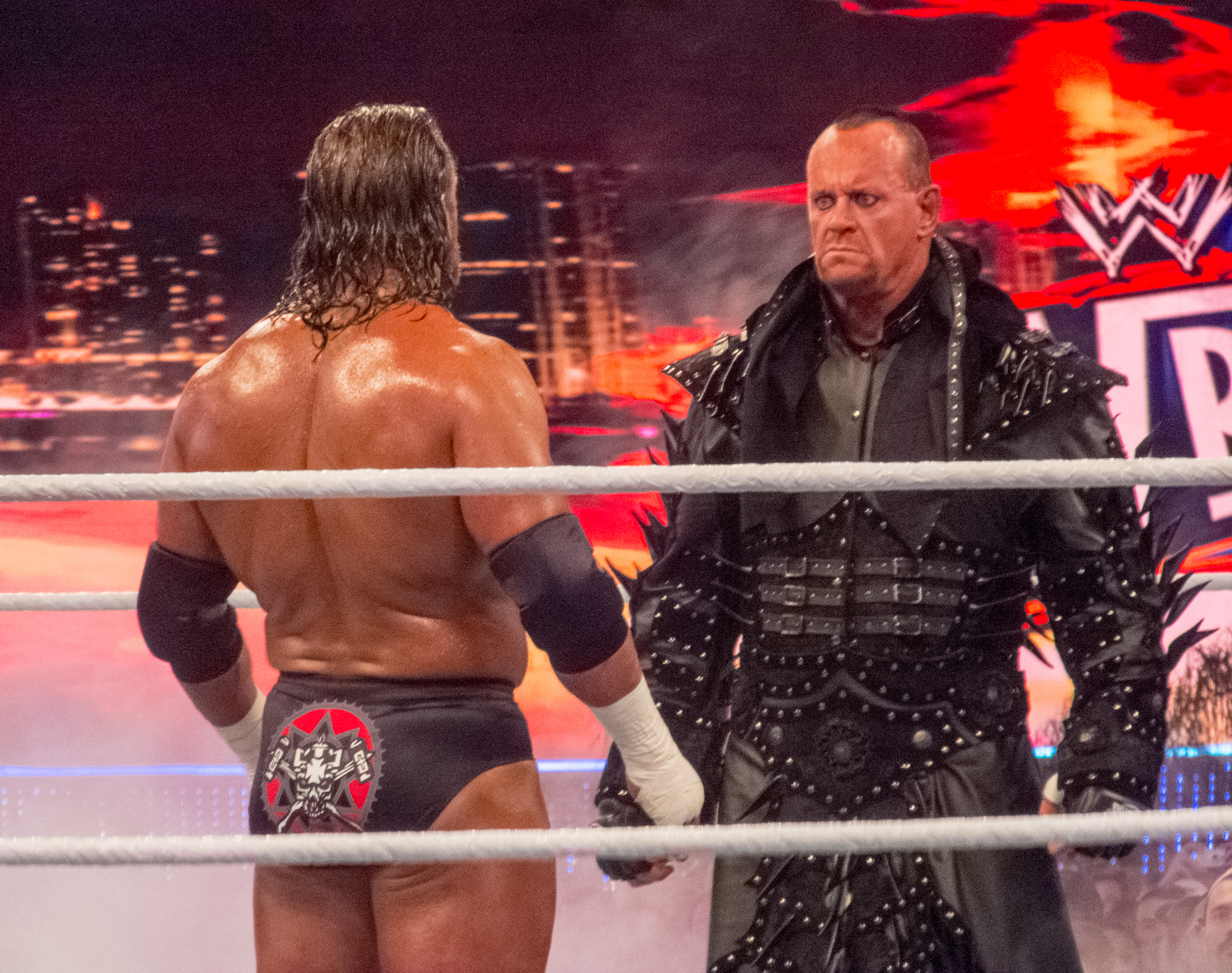
Triple H and the Undertaker at WrestleMania XXVIII

On the January 30, 2012 episode of Raw SuperShow, the Undertaker returned after a nine-month hiatus to confront Triple H. On the February 13 episode of Raw SuperShow, Triple H refused the Undertaker's challenge for a WrestleMania rematch. After the Undertaker accused Triple H of living in the shadow of Shawn Michaels on the February 20 episode of Raw SuperShow, Triple H accepted the challenge on the condition that it would be a Hell in a Cell match; Michaels was later inserted as guest referee in the match. At WrestleMania XXVIII, the Undertaker, while debuting his new look, a mohawk, defeated Triple H to extend his Streak to 20–0. After the match, the Undertaker and Michaels carried Triple H to the entrance stage, where the three embraced. Later in 2012, the Undertaker appeared on the 1000th episode of Raw on July 23 to help Kane, who had been confronted by Jinder Mahal, Curt Hawkins, Tyler Reks, Hunico, Camacho and Drew McIntyre. The Brothers of Destruction overcame and dominated the six other wrestlers.

The Undertaker's next television appearance was on Old School Raw on March 4, 2013, where he opened the show by performing his signature entrance. CM Punk, Randy Orton, Big Show and Sheamus fought in a fatal four-way match to determine who would face him at WrestleMania 29, which Punk won. After the real-life death of Paul Bearer on March 5, 2013, a storyline involving Punk regularly spiting the Undertaker through displays of flippancy and disrespect towards Bearer's death began. Punk interrupted the Undertaker's ceremony to honor Bearer on Raw, stealing the trademark urn and later using it to attack Kane, humiliate The Brothers of Destruction and mock Bearer. The Undertaker defeated Punk at WrestleMania 29 to extend his Streak to 21–0 and then took back the urn. The following night on Raw, the Undertaker came out to pay his respects to Bearer, but was interrupted by The Shield, who attempted to attack Undertaker before Team Hell No (Kane and Daniel Bryan) made the save. The Undertaker would wrestle his final Raw match (his first since 2010) on the April 22 episode, teaming with Kane and Bryan against The Shield in a losing effort. Four days later, he wrestled his final SmackDown match (also his first since 2010), defeating Shield member Dean Ambrose by submission. Afterward, the Undertaker was attacked by Ambrose and the rest of The Shield, who performed a triple powerbomb through the broadcast table on him.

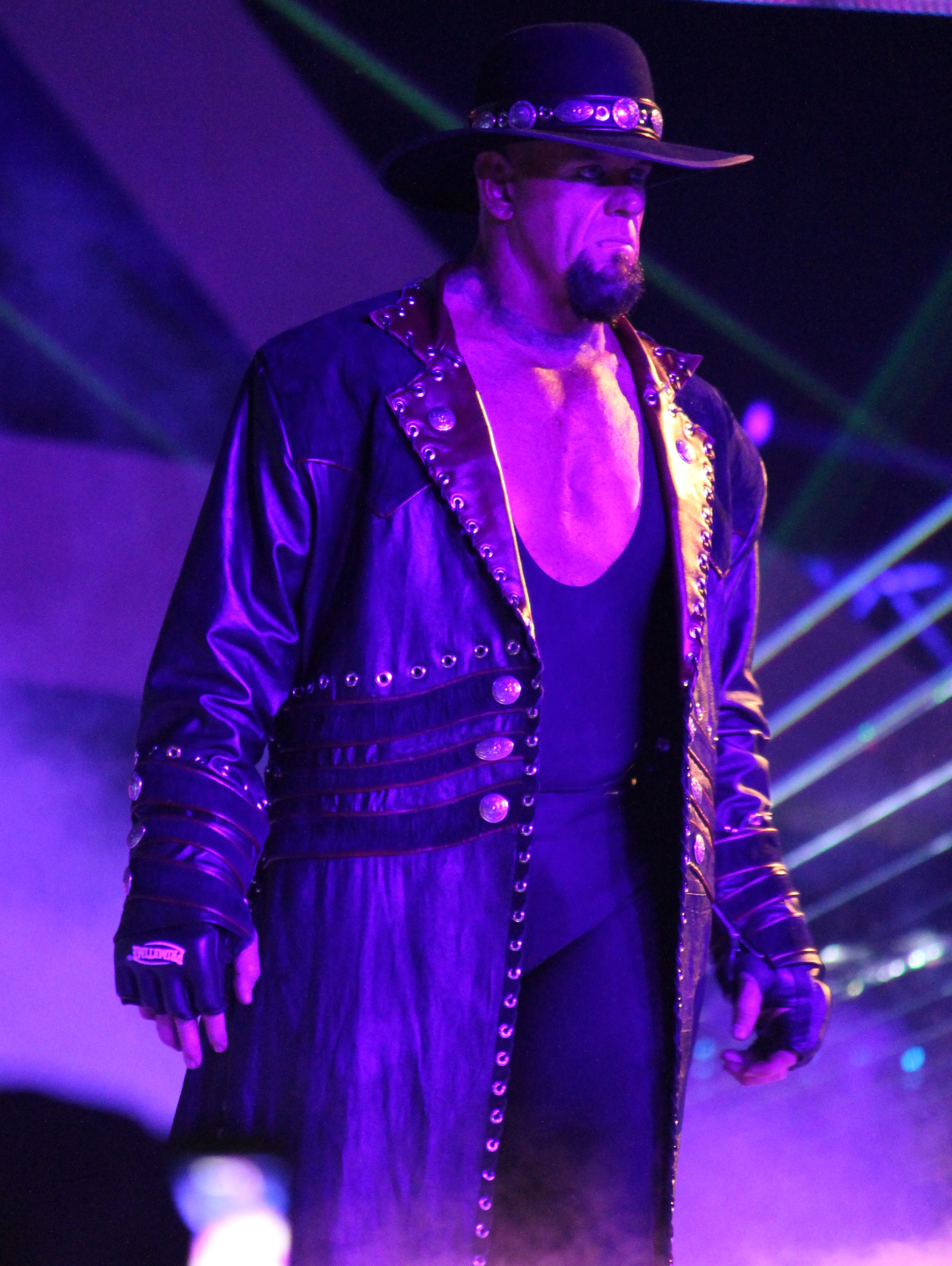
The Undertaker approaching the ring at WrestleMania XXX in 2014

On the February 24, 2014, episode of Raw, the Undertaker returned to confront Brock Lesnar and accepted his challenge for a match at WrestleMania XXX. After 25 minutes and three F-5s, Lesnar won the match at WrestleMania by pinfall, ending The Undertaker's Streak in what was described as "the most shocking result in WWE history". Following the match, the Undertaker was hospitalized with a severe concussion which he suffered in the first minutes of the match. In a December 2014 interview, Vince McMahon confirmed that it was his final decision to have Lesnar end The Streak and that the Undertaker was initially shocked at the decision. McMahon justified his decision that it would significantly enhance Lesnar's formidability to set up the next WrestleMania event and that there were no other viable candidates to fill Lesnar's role. In 2014, the Undertaker was also offered to be inducted into the WWE Hall of Fame, but he declined the offer, feeling it wasn't time yet.

==== Final feuds (2015–2020) ====
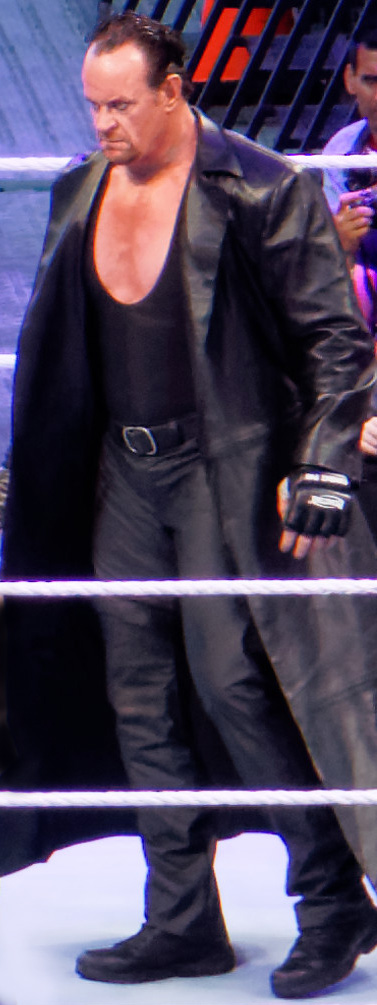
The Undertaker in the ring at WrestleMania 31 in 2015

In February 2015, Bray Wyatt began a series of cryptic promos which led to Fastlane, where Wyatt challenged the Undertaker to a match at WrestleMania 31, which the Undertaker accepted. At WrestleMania, the Undertaker defeated Wyatt after two Tombstone Piledrivers.

At Battleground in July, the Undertaker made his return by attacking Lesnar as he was on the verge of defeating Seth Rollins during his WWE World Heavyweight Championship match, causing the match to end in a disqualification win for Lesnar. The next night on Raw, the Undertaker explained his actions as revenge, not against Lesnar breaking The Streak, but rather the constant taunting he allowed Paul Heyman to engage in. Later that night, after the Undertaker and Lesnar brawled throughout the arena and had to be separated, a rematch was scheduled for SummerSlam in August, where the Undertaker controversially defeated Lesnar. Lesnar put the Undertaker in a kimura lock and the timekeeper rang the bell after seeing the Undertaker supposedly indicating submission, but since the referee had not seen a submission and never stopped the match, the match continued. The confusion allowed the Undertaker to surprise Lesnar with a low blow and apply Hell's Gate, in which Lesnar passed out. At Hell in a Cell, the Undertaker was defeated by Lesnar in a Hell in a Cell match after Lesnar hit him with his own low blow, returning the favor, and executing what was his third F-5 of the match.

While the crowd gave the Undertaker an ovation after his loss to Lesnar, he was attacked and captured by The Wyatt Family (Bray Wyatt, Luke Harper, Erick Rowan and Braun Strowman), who carried him away from the ring. After ambushing and capturing Kane the next night on Raw, Wyatt explained that he had claimed their souls and stole their demonic powers. The Brothers of Destruction returned on the November 9 episode of Raw and attacked The Wyatt Family, setting up a tag team match at Survivor Series, which honored the Undertaker's 25 years in WWE. At Survivor Series on November 22, the Brothers of Destruction defeated Wyatt and Harper.

On the February 22, 2016, episode of Raw, Vince McMahon placed his son Shane McMahon, who returned to WWE for the first time since 2009, in a Hell in a Cell match at WrestleMania 32 against the Undertaker with the stipulation that if Shane won, he would gain control of Raw. Vince later decided that should Undertaker lose the match against Shane, it would be his final match at WrestleMania. After weeks of random physical confrontations and mind games exchanged between the pair, the Undertaker defeated Shane McMahon at WrestleMania 32. the Undertaker would not appear again until the 900th episode of SmackDown on November 15, issuing a threat to Team SmackDown if they failed to defeat Team Raw at the upcoming Survivor Series pay-per-view.

The Undertaker appeared on the January 23 episode of Raw, confronting Brock Lesnar and Goldberg. During the Royal Rumble on January 29, the Undertaker entered at number 29, eliminating Goldberg, The Miz, Baron Corbin and Sami Zayn, before being eliminated by the number 30 entrant, Roman Reigns. The Undertaker returned on the March 6 episode of Raw and performed a chokeslam on Reigns. This led to a No Holds Barred match between the Undertaker and Reigns at WrestleMania 33, in which the Undertaker lost to Reigns after five spears in his fourth WrestleMania main event. After the match, the Undertaker left his gloves, coat and hat in the center of the ring before slowly making his exit.

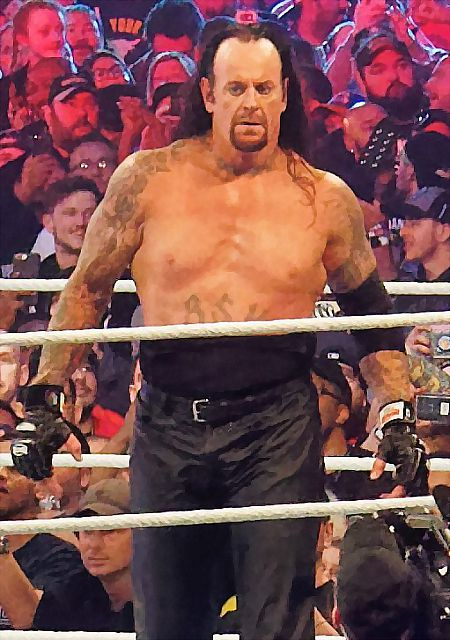
The Undertaker at WrestleMania 34 in April 2018

The Undertaker took part in the Raw 25 Years broadcast on January 22, 2018, his first post-WrestleMania 33 appearance. In the months prior to WrestleMania 34, John Cena challenged the Undertaker to a singles match. At WrestleMania, after Elias confronted Cena and was beaten down, the Undertaker's hat and coat appeared in the center of the ring and were struck by lightning. The Undertaker then appeared and beat Cena in a three-minute squash match. Three weeks later, the Undertaker defeated Rusev at WWE's Greatest Royal Rumble event in a casket match. At Super Show-Down in Australia on October 6, the Undertaker faced Triple H in a no disqualification match billed as the "Last Time Ever"; they were accompanied by Kane and Shawn Michaels, respectively. The Undertaker lost the match after interference from Michaels. After the match, the four men shook hands as a sign of respect, however, the Undertaker and Kane would follow this by attacking them. As a result, the duos reunited their respective tag teams—the Brothers of Destruction and D-Generation X—and faced each other at Crown Jewel on November 2, where the Undertaker and Kane lost their final match as a tag team.

On the April 8, 2019 episode of Raw, the night after WrestleMania 35—the first WrestleMania in 19 years without his involvement—The Undertaker appeared to interrupt and attack Elias during a musical performance. The Undertaker made his return to the ring to face Goldberg at Super ShowDown in Saudi Arabia on June 7, defeating him in the main event of the night in their first match against each other. On the June 24, 2019 episode of Raw, during a handicap match in which Roman Reigns was dominated by Shane McMahon and Drew McIntyre, the Undertaker suddenly appeared and attacked McMahon and McIntyre. The Undertaker and Reigns were later scheduled to face McMahon and McIntyre in a No Holds Barred tag team match at Extreme Rules. At Extreme Rules, the Undertaker and Reigns won. This turned out to be the Undertaker's final match in front of a live audience in the United States.

The Undertaker returned at Super ShowDown in Saudi Arabia on February 27, 2020, as a surprise replacement in a gauntlet match. He entered the match last, replacing Rey Mysterio and defeating AJ Styles to win the Tuwaiq Mountain Trophy. At Elimination Chamber during a match between Styles and Aleister Black, the Undertaker made another surprise appearance with an attack on Styles. The following night on Raw, Styles challenged the Undertaker to a match at WrestleMania 36. Over the following weeks that led up to WrestleMania, a resentful Styles made unprecedented efforts to expose the Undertaker, going so far as departing from bashing his Deadman gimmick, instead taking to a metafiction form of bashing Calaway himself. The feud saw Styles solely referring to the Undertaker by his real name, Mark Calaway, referencing his age and his wife, Michelle McCool. In response, the Undertaker cut promos of ominous warning against Styles in which for the first time in years, he broke from the Deadman gimmick by presenting as himself out of character. In doing so, elements of his American Badass gimmick were reflected with Calaway making appearances in his biker gear. At WrestleMania 36, the Undertaker presented his third and final identity, "The Unholy Trinity", a combination of The Deadman, American Badass, and himself as Mark Calaway, this blend allowing him to trash talk Styles over real life matters during their encounter, while also able to maintain his superhuman horror capabilities. In what was subsequently learned to be the Undertaker's final match, he and Styles fought in a cemetery at a secluded rural locale, competing in what was a cinematic, narrative-heavy brawl similar to "Buried Alive matches", named the "Boneyard match". Despite the assistance of Gallows and Anderson, the Undertaker buried Styles in the grave to win this match and ride off on motorcycle into the sunset, scoring his 25th WrestleMania victory to complete his professional wrestling career.

==== Retirement and Hall of Fame (2020–2022) ====
On June 21, 2020, in the final episode of the Undertaker: The Last Ride documentary, Callaway retired from the professional wrestling industry. Later on that November, he confirmed that he was "officially retired" in an interview. Many wrestlers and other public figures paid tribute to him on their social media pages. Madison Square Garden, regarded as the most famous venue in professional wrestling, also paid tribute to him.

The Undertaker, wearing his trademark mortician trench coat and stetson hat, made an appearance at the conclusion of the Survivor Series event on November 22, 2020. The event was dedicated to him, commemorating thirty years from that time since his WWE debut. There, he reiterated that his career had been completed, giving an emotional farewell speech which ended in typical Undertaker fashion: "My time has come to let the Undertaker Rest in Peace." A ten-bell salute was also given for the Undertaker character as he did his traditional take-the-knee pose, and a holographic image of Paul Bearer, the Undertaker's former manager, was projected in the ring.

On April 1, 2022, the Undertaker was formally inducted into the WWE Hall of Fame at the American Airlines Center. At his induction, Calaway made a 137-minute speech that opened with a 10-minute, emotional standing ovation from the live audience, bringing Calaway to tears. Calaway's acceptance speech, hailed by media outlets as matchless and beyond compare, was motivational and shared his collection of self-reflections and life philosophies for success. In making his speech, he stood before several genres of his Deadman character, through the varying costumes displayed on mannequins. Later that same weekend, Calaway made appearances on the entrance stage on both nights of WrestleMania.

==== Sporadic appearances and backstage roles (2023–present) ====
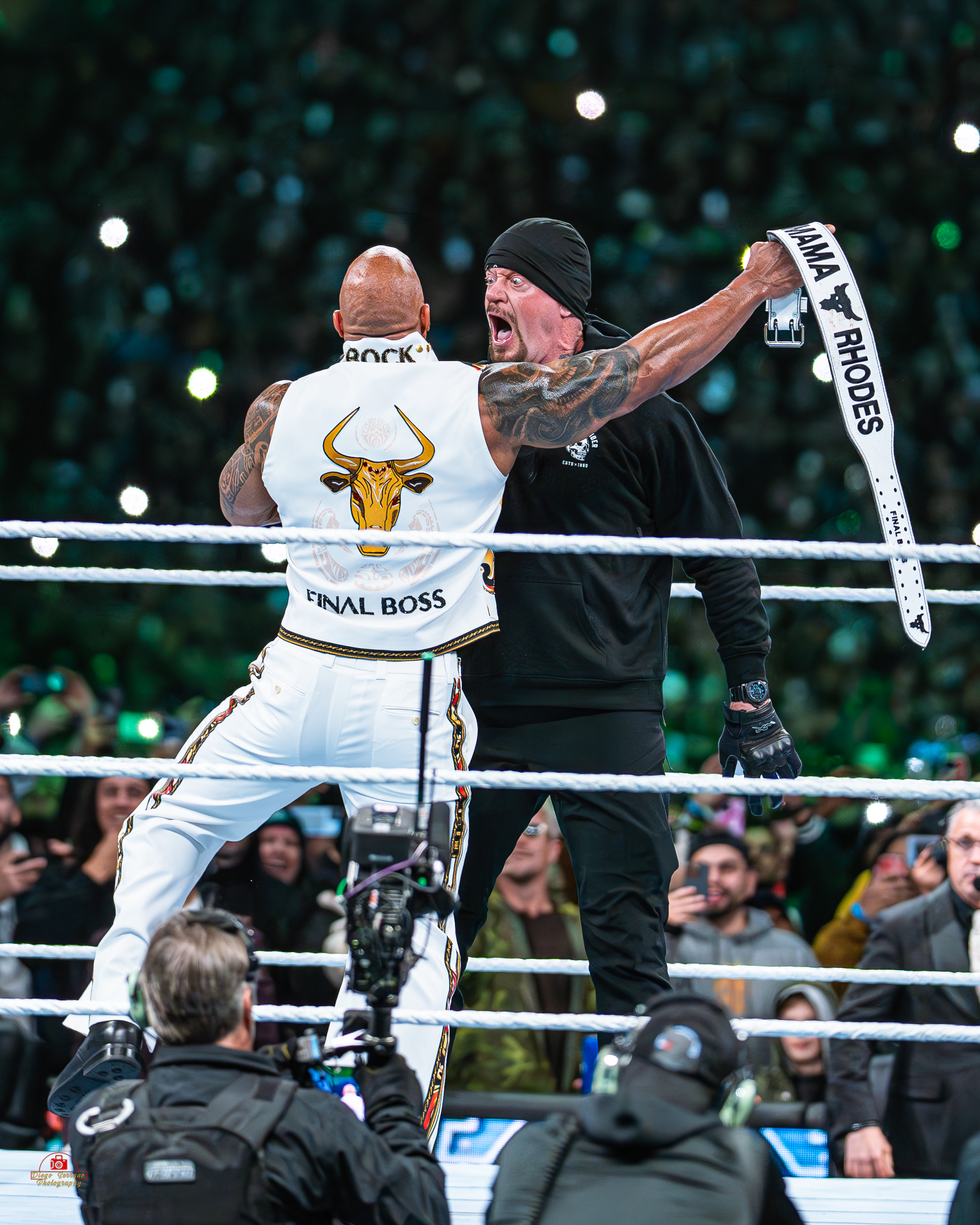
The Undertaker about to chokeslam The Rock at WrestleMania XL.

On January 23, 2023, the Undertaker made an appearance at the Monday Night Raw 30th Anniversary special, Raw is XXX. He appeared under his American Badass gimmick, confronting LA Knight and seemingly giving his approval to Bray Wyatt. On October 10, 2023, the Undertaker made his first appearance on WWE NXT chokeslamming Bron Breakker.

On April 5, 2024, the Undertaker inducted Muhammad Ali into the 2024 WWE Hall of Fame. On April 7, 2024, the Undertaker appeared briefly during the Night 2 main event of WrestleMania XL between Roman Reigns and Cody Rhodes where he aided Cody Rhodes and chokeslammed The Rock. On the Raw premiere on Netflix on January 6, 2025, the Undertaker made an appearance under his American Badass persona and congratulated the new Women's World Champion Rhea Ripley after her victory. On April 29, 2025, he made an appearance on WWE NXT, warning NXT Champion Oba Femi that the LFG trainees would be coming for his championship. On July 22, 2025, he made another appearance on WWE NXT, this time under his American Badass gimmick, confronting and chokeslamming Trick Williams.

In August 2025, it was reported that the Undertaker was "one of the big driving forces behind" WWE's Mexican subsidiary Lucha Libre AAA Worldwide (AAA). Undertaker serves as "an influential figure" in AAA's creative and production processes.

== Legacy and reception ==
=== Recognitions and acclaim ===
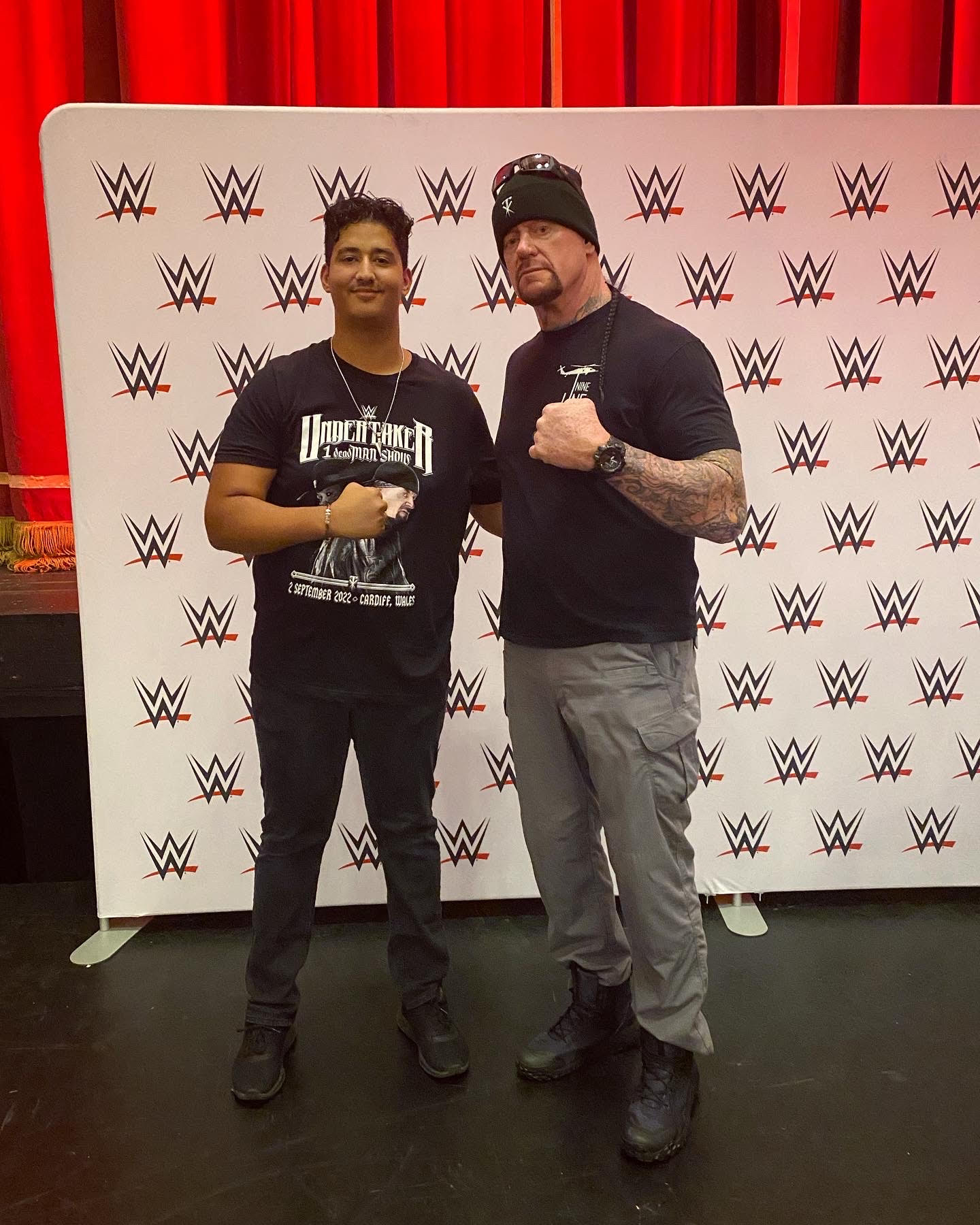
The Undertaker with a fan at a WWE convention in September 2022.

The Undertaker has been named one of the greatest wrestlers of all time; and the greatest character, and most iconic figure, in WWE history. He was voted the greatest WWE wrestler ever in a 2013 Digital Spy poll. In naming him the second greatest wrestler ever, IGN described Undertaker as, "one of the most respected wrestlers, and characters, in the business; treated with actual reverence. Like a cherished, invaluable artifact". Luis Paez-Pumar of Complex wrote that the Undertaker character is "easily the best gimmick in the history of professional wrestling". Luke Winkie of Sports Illustrated listed Undertaker as the fifth greatest wrestler of all time. His consecutive matches with Shawn Michaels at WrestleManias XXV and XXVI were met with critical acclaim, with both matches winning the Pro Wrestling Illustrated and Wrestling Observer Newsletter awards for Match of the Year in 2009 and 2010 respectively. His Hell in a cell match with Triple H at WrestleMania XXVIII won the 2012 Slammy Award for the match of the year as well as being voted the match of the year on Pro Wrestling Illustrated. In 2025, the WWE ranked his match with Shawn Michaels at WrestleMania 25 the greatest WrestleMaina match of all time.

Wrestler Big Show named the Undertaker as the greatest professional wrestler of all time, while Mark Henry and WWE chairman Vince McMahon have called him their favorite. WWE Hall of Famer and former company executive, Jim Ross, said: "Without question, the Undertaker is the greatest big man in the history of wrestling... There is no greater WWE star ever than the Undertaker". In November 2015, Telegraph journalist Tom Fordy called Undertaker "the world's greatest sportsman".

Undertaker's Deadman character has been praised as one of the best in professional wrestling. He received the Wrestling Observer Newsletter's Best Gimmick award from 1990 to 1994. Tim Friorvant of ESPN named Undertaker "a character that has been a cornerstone of the WWE for more than three decades". Shawn Valentino of Pro Wrestling Torch said "the Undertaker may have been the greatest character in the history of professional wrestling".

A 12-minute match between Undertaker and Stone Cold Steve Austin drew a 9.5 rating on June 28, 1999. It stands as the highest-rated segment in Raw history.

=== Reception to later career ===
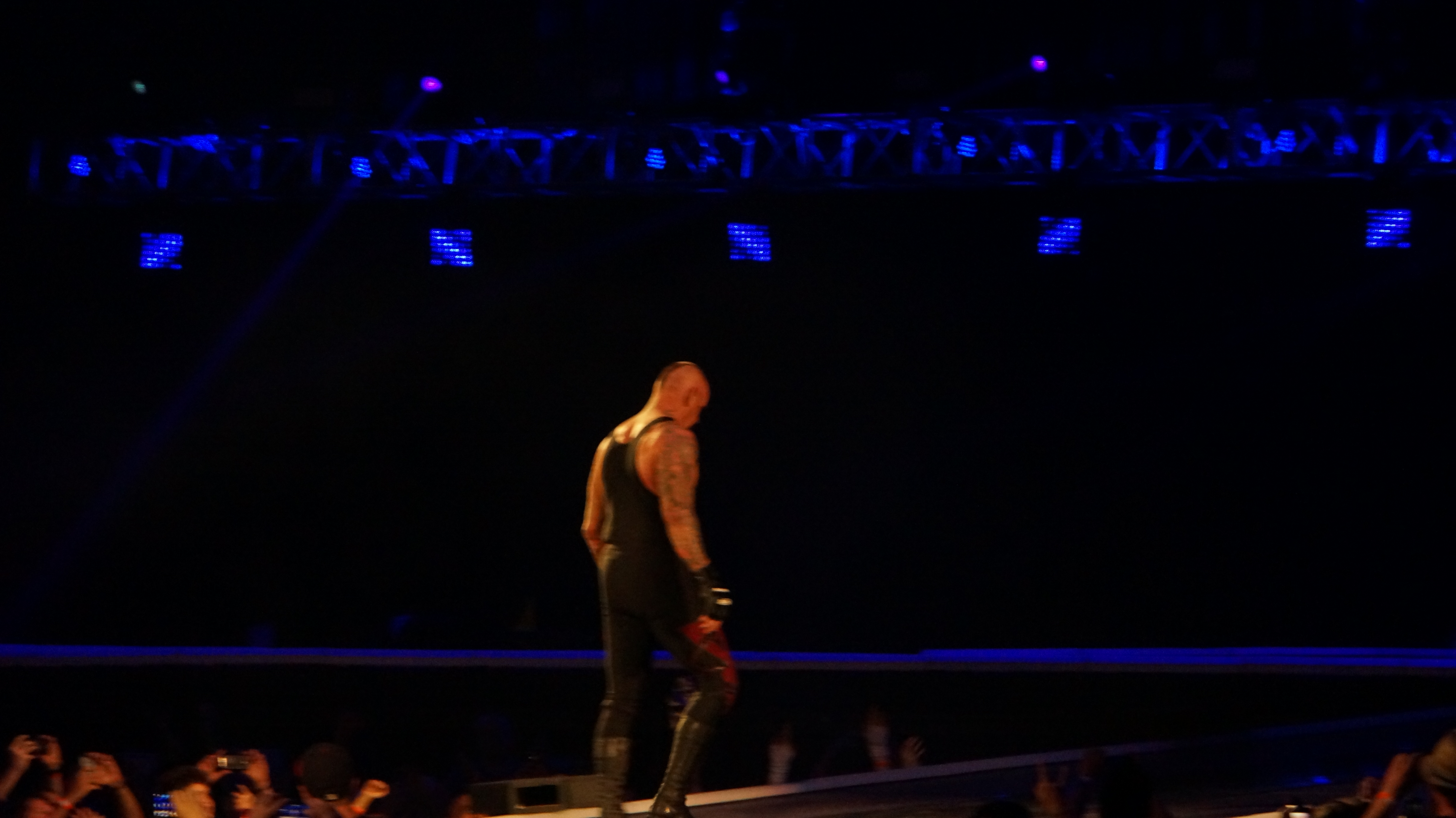
The Undertaker walks away from the ring after The Streak was broken at WrestleMania XXX in April 2014.

In contrast to the high praise the Undertaker received during the vast majority of his professional wrestling career, he was heavily criticized for continuing to perform throughout the latter part of his wrestling career, particularly after his first defeat at WrestleMania in 2014. Calaway would later reveal that after suffering a severe concussion in his WrestleMania match against Lesnar, he lost his confidence. At WrestleMania 33, after his second defeat against Roman Reigns, Luis Paez-Pumar of Rolling Stone said that Undertaker "should have retired when The Streak was broken" but "lived on to pass the rub on to Reigns in the sloppiest, saddest manner possible". Undertaker himself said he was disappointed by his performance against Reigns. After his match against John Cena at WrestleMania 34, IGN posted an article titled "Undertaker's return was awesome, but now he needs to retire". After his match at Crown Jewel in November 2018, Pro Wrestling Torch's Wade Keller wrote that Undertaker looked "brittle" and Jason Powell of Pro Wrestling Dot Net said "they [Undertaker, Kane, Michaels and Triple H] need to accept their limitations, stop pretending they belong in main events, and stop acting like being in these main events isn't stealing the spotlight". His subsequent match with Goldberg at Super ShowDown in June 2019 was also widely pilloried, with Bryan Rose of the Wrestling Observer Newsletter calling it "sad more than anything". In reviewing the show, Dave Meltzer of the same publication wrote that Goldberg "has juice left, while Undertaker doesn't". Undertaker himself called the match "a disaster" in 2020.

== Personal life ==
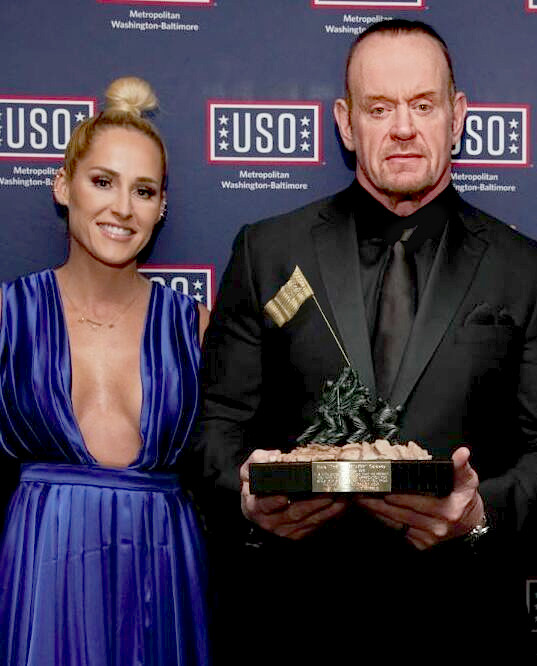
Calaway and McCool in November 2019

Calaway married Jodi Lynn in 1989. They had a son in 1993 and divorced in 1999. Calaway married Sara Frank in 2000, and she made televised appearances with WWE in 2001 as part of a feud between Calaway and Diamond Dallas Page, in which she was acknowledged as Calaway's wife. They had two daughters before divorcing in 2007. In 2010, Calaway married former professional wrestler Michelle McCool. They have a daughter born in 2012 and an adopted son.

In the 1990s, Calaway started a backstage "posse" called the Bone Street Krew which consisted of some of his best friends and fellow wrestlers Yokozuna, Savio Vega, Charles Wright, The Godwinns, and Rikishi. Each member had the initials "BSK" tattooed onto themselves, with Calaway's prominently marked across his stomach.

Calaway is a fan of boxing and mixed martial arts, which he incorporated into his onscreen character. He has practiced Brazilian jiu-jitsu and earned a black belt in 2011. He is also a passionate fan of the Texas Longhorns football team, where in 2021 the team presented him a custom helmet. In 2023, with the Big 12 Conference collaborating with the WWE for the conference championship game, he presented Texas QB Quinn Ewers with a custom-made, co-branded WWE x Big 12 title belt, naming him the MVP of the teams' matchup against the Oklahoma State Cowboys.

He invests in real estate with his business partner, Scott Everhart. The two finished construction on a $2.7 million building in Loveland, Colorado, called "The Calahart" (a portmanteau of their last names), in 2007. A dog lover, Calaway and his ex-wife Sara established The Zeus Compton Calaway Save the Animals Fund at the Texas A&M College of Veterinary Medicine & Biomedical Sciences to help pay for lifesaving treatments for large dogs.

In June 2020, Calaway expressed support for the Blue Lives Matter movement. Later that year, Dave Meltzer reported that Calaway had made several donations totaling $7,000 to Donald Trump's re-election campaign. In February 2021, Calaway stated that he would endorse fellow wrestler Dwayne Johnson if he were to ever run for president, expressing that he felt Johnson could be the great "uniter" and ease the American political divide. Calaway and Glenn Jacobs endorsed Trump in the 2024 United States presidential election, appearing in a TikTok video with him.

== In other media ==
Calaway made his acting debut as Hutch in the 1991 film Suburban Commando. He had guest roles on Poltergeist: The Legacy and Celebrity Deathmatch. In 2002, he appeared on the Canadian sports show Off the Record with Michael Landsberg.

On January 15, 2022, Donald Trump used the Undertaker's theme music as part of his "Save America" rally held in Florence, Arizona. The song that was played incorporates funeral bell tolls and was created by WWE composer Jim Johnston as an embellished remix of "Funeral March". During the rally, the song was accompanied by a music video playing on large screens, advancing through multitudes of scenes intended to alarm the public of looming danger resulting from the presidency of Trump's successor Joe Biden. The song continued to play out for 30 seconds following the attack ad against Biden, ending just short of Trump making his entrance. Other than his music being played, Calaway was not reported to have any association with the affair, though he had previously donated to Trump's campaign in 2020 and would later endorse him in 2024.

In 2024, Calaway launched his own YouTube channel and podcast titled Six Feet Under with Mark Calaway. The show then went on hiatus in March 2025, but it was later announced that WWE had acquired the podcast. In June of that year, the podcast returned this time airing on WWE's official YouTube channel featuring other wrestlers as special guests. On November 19, 2025, WWE announced that Calaway launched his own YouTube channel, Undertaker to celebrate his 35th anniversary, the channel consists of Calaway talking about his wrestling career, and reacting to matches. On January 27, 2026, Calaway's former co-host Matt Lyda, rebranded the "Six Feet Under with Mark Calaway" to his own, named "When Wrestling Was Real with Matt Lyda".

In 2025, he appeared in the documentary film WrestleMania IX: The Spectacle. The documentary was released on Peacock on April 11, 2025.

Calaway has served as a “Legend” (one of the coaches) on the television show WWE LFG since its first season which debuted on February 16, 2025. The series features up-and-coming talent from the WWE Performance Center system competing for a contract in WWE's NXT division. He won season one of the competition.

=== Filmography ===
Film
Year	Title	Role	Notes
1991	Suburban Commando	Hutch	
1999	Beyond the Mat	Himself	Documentary
2015	The Flintstones & WWE: Stone Age SmackDown!	The Undertaker (Deadman)	Voice
2016	Scooby-Doo! and WWE: Curse of the Speed Demon	The Undertaker (Deadman)	Voice
2017	Surf's Up 2: WaveMania	The Undertaker (Deadman)	Voice
2021	Escape the Undertaker	The Undertaker (Deadman)	Interactive

Television
Year	Title	Role	Notes
1999	Poltergeist: The Legacy	Soul Chaser Demon	2 episodes
1999	Downtown	The Undertaker (Deadman voice)	Episode: "The Con"
1999	Celebrity Deathmatch	The Undertaker (Deadman voice)	Episode: "Halloween Episode I"
2001	America's Most Wanted	The Undertaker (American Badass)	
2025	WWE LFG	Himself	Judge

== Video games ==
Calaway's WWE character has been included in numerous WWE video games, beginning with WWF Super WrestleMania (1992). A special Undertaker-themed version of WWE 2K14 was released in 2013. The Undertaker is also the most featured wrestler in WWF/E's video game collection, having been presented on every game in the franchise.

== Championships and accomplishments ==
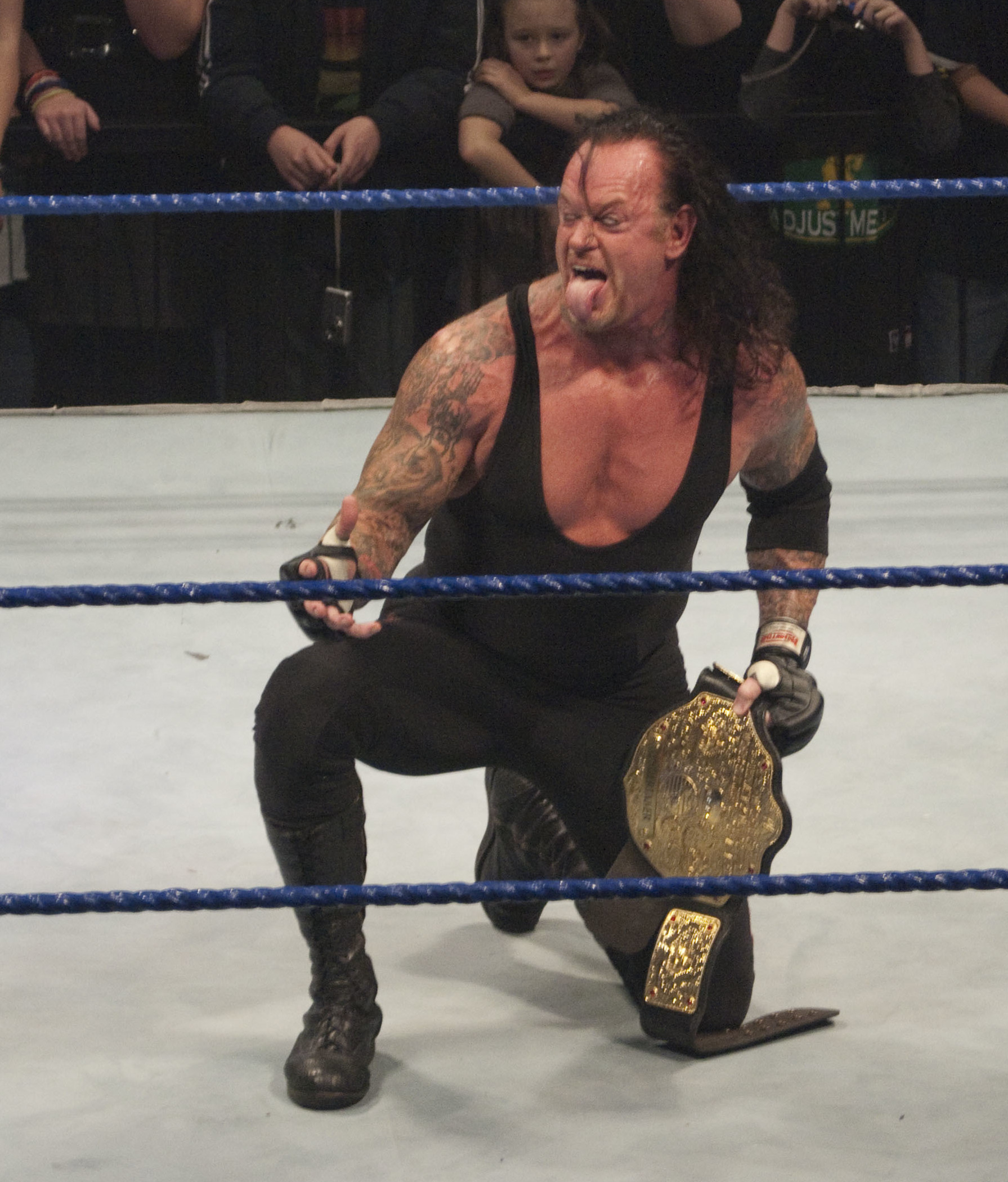
The Undertaker is a three-time World Heavyweight Champion.

- The Baltimore Sun
  - Feud of the Year (2007) vs. Batista
  - Best Match of the Decade (2000s) vs. Shawn Michaels at WrestleMania 25
  - Match of the Year (2009) vs. Shawn Michaels at WrestleMania 25
  - Match of the Year (2010) vs. Shawn Michaels in a career vs. streak match at WrestleMania XXVI
- CBS Sports
  - Worst Angle of the Year (2018) with Kane vs. Triple H and Shawn Michaels
- Pro Wrestling Illustrated
  - Comeback of the Year (2015)
  - Feud of the Year (1991) vs. Ultimate Warrior
  - Feud of the Year (2015) vs. Brock Lesnar
  - Match of the Year (1998) vs. Mankind in a Hell in a Cell match at King of the Ring
  - Match of the Year (2009) vs. Shawn Michaels at WrestleMania 25
  - Match of the Year (2010) vs. Shawn Michaels in a career vs. streak match at WrestleMania XXVI
  - Match of the Year (2012) vs. Triple H in a Hell in a Cell match at WrestleMania XXVIII
  - Ranked No. 2 of the top 500 singles wrestlers in the PWI 500 in 2002
  - Ranked No. 21 of the top 500 singles wrestlers of the "PWI Years" in 2003
- Sports Illustrated
  - Ranked No. 6 of the 20 Greatest WWE Wrestlers Of All Time
- United States Wrestling Association
  - USWA Unified World Heavyweight Championship (1 time)
- World Class Wrestling Association
  - WCWA Texas Heavyweight Championship (1 time)
- Wrestling Observer Newsletter
  - Best Gimmick (1990–1994)
  - Best Heel (1991)
  - Feud of the Year (2007) vs. Batista
  - Match of the Year (2009) vs. Shawn Michaels at WrestleMania 25
  - Match of the Year (2010) vs. Shawn Michaels in a career vs. streak match at WrestleMania XXVI
  - Worst Worked Match of the Year (2001) with Kane vs. KroniK at Unforgiven
  - Worst Match of the Year (2018) with Kane vs. Triple H and Shawn Michaels at Crown Jewel
  - Most Overrated (2001)
  - Readers' Least Favorite Wrestler (2001)
  - Worst Feud of the Year (1993) vs. Giant González
  - Most Disgusting Promotional Tactic (2005) Involvement in a terrorist angle that aired on day of London bombings
  - Wrestling Observer Newsletter Hall of Fame (Class of 2004)
- World Wrestling Federation / Entertainment / WWE
  - WWF/WWE Championship (4 times)
  - World Heavyweight Championship (3 times)
  - WWF Hardcore Championship (1 time)
  - WWF World Tag Team Championship (6 times) – with Stone Cold Steve Austin (1), Big Show (2), The Rock (1), and Kane (2)
  - WCW Tag Team Championship (1 time) – with Kane
  - Royal Rumble (2007)
  - WWE Hall of Fame (Class of 2022)
  - Tuwaiq Mountain Trophy (2020)
  - Undisputed WWF Championship #1 contender's Tournament (April 2002)
  - Slammy Award (15 times)
    - Best Entrance Music (1997)
    - Best Tattoo (1997)
    - Match of the Year (2009, 2010, 2012, 2015, 2020) vs. Shawn Michaels at WrestleMania 25, vs. Shawn Michaels at WrestleMania XXVI, vs. Triple H in a Hell in a Cell match at WrestleMania XXVIII, vs. Brock Lesnar at Hell in a Cell, and vs. AJ Styles in a Boneyard match at WrestleMania 36.
    - Moment of the Year (2010) vs. Shawn Michaels at WrestleMania XXVI
    - Most Intimidating (1994)
    - OMG Moment of the Year (2011) Kicking out of Triple H's Tombstone Piledriver at WrestleMania XXVII
    - Rivalry of the Year (2015) vs. Brock Lesnar
    - Star of the Highest Magnitude (1997)
    - WWF's Greatest Hit (1996) Sucking Diesel into the abyss at In Your House 6: Rage in the Cage
    - Moment of the Year (2020) The Undertaker's final farewell at Survivor Series
    - WWE Network Documentary of the Year (2020) Undertaker: The Last Ride
  - NXT Year-End Award
    - Moment of the Year (2023 - appearing on the October 10 episode of NXT)
  - WWE Bronze Statue (2022)
  - WWE LFG Championship (Season 1)
  - All-Time Most career victories in PPV/PLE: 107 matches, including:
    - All-Time Career best record in WrestleMania (25 wins (including 21 consecutive wins), 2 losses)
    - All-Time Career best record in Summerslam (10 wins, 5 losses, 2 draws)

== Other awards and honors ==
- Eyegore Award (2000)

== WrestleMania record ==
WrestleMania record breakdown		
27 matches	25 wins	2 losses
By pinfall	20	2
By submission	2	0
By disqualification	1	0
By casket	1	0
By burial	1	0

WrestleMania win–loss record of The Undertaker
Result	Rec.	Opponent	Date	Match time and method of victory	Venue	Note
Win	1–0	Jimmy Snuka	March 24, 1991; WrestleMania VII	4:20; Pinfall	Los Angeles Memorial Sports Arena; Los Angeles, California	
Win	2–0	Jake Roberts	April 5, 1992; WrestleMania VIII	6:36; Pinfall	Hoosier Dome; Indianapolis, Indiana	
Win	3–0	Giant González	April 4, 1993; WrestleMania IX	7:33; Disqualification	Caesars Palace; Las Vegas, Nevada	
Win	4–0	King Kong Bundy	April 2, 1995; WrestleMania XI	6:36; Pinfall	Hartford Civic Center; Hartford, Connecticut	
Win	5–0	Diesel	March 31, 1996; WrestleMania XII	16:46; Pinfall	Arrowhead Pond; Anaheim, California	
Win	6–0	Sycho Sid	March 23, 1997; WrestleMania 13	21:19; Pinfall	Rosemont Horizon; Rosemont, Illinois	Won the WWF Championship.
Win	7–0	Kane	March 29, 1998; WrestleMania XIV	17:05; Pinfall	Fleet Center; Boston, Massachusetts	
Win	8–0	Big Boss Man	March 28, 1999; WrestleMania XV	9:48; Pinfall	First Union Center; Philadelphia, Pennsylvania	This was a Hell in a Cell match.
Win	9–0	Triple H	April 1, 2001; WrestleMania X-Seven	18:19; Pinfall	Reliant Astrodome; Houston, Texas	
Win	10–0	Ric Flair	March 17, 2002; WrestleMania X8	18:47; Pinfall	SkyDome; Toronto, Ontario, Canada	This was a no disqualification match.
Win	11–0	A-Train and Big Show	March 30, 2003; WrestleMania XIX	9:45; Pinfall	Safeco Field; Seattle, Washington	This was a 2-on-1 handicap match.
Win	12–0	Kane	March 14, 2004; WrestleMania XX	7:45; Pinfall	Madison Square Garden; New York City, New York	
Win	13–0	Randy Orton	April 3, 2005; WrestleMania 21	14:14; Pinfall	Staples Center; Los Angeles, California	
Win	14–0	Mark Henry	April 2, 2006; WrestleMania 22	9:26; Casket	Allstate Arena; Rosemont, Illinois	This was a casket match.
Win	15–0	Batista	April 1, 2007; WrestleMania 23	15:47; Pinfall	Ford Field; Detroit, Michigan	Won the World Heavyweight Championship.
Win	16–0	Edge	March 30, 2008; WrestleMania XXIV	23:50; Submission	Citrus Bowl; Orlando, Florida	Won the World Heavyweight Championship.
Win	17–0	Shawn Michaels	April 5, 2009; WrestleMania XXV	30:41; Pinfall	Reliant Stadium; Houston, Texas	
Win	18–0	Shawn Michaels	March 28, 2010; WrestleMania XXVI	23:59; Pinfall	University of Phoenix Stadium; Glendale, Arizona	This was a Streak vs. Career match contested under No Holds Barred rules.
Win	19–0	Triple H	April 3, 2011; WrestleMania XXVII	29:22; Submission	Georgia Dome; Atlanta, Georgia	This was a No Holds Barred match.
Win	20–0	Triple H	April 1, 2012; WrestleMania XXVIII	30:50; Pinfall	Sun Life Stadium; Miami Gardens, Florida	This was a Hell in a Cell match with Shawn Michaels serving as the special guest referee.
Win	21–0	CM Punk	April 7, 2013; WrestleMania 29	22:07; Pinfall	MetLife Stadium; East Rutherford, New Jersey	
Loss	21–1	Brock Lesnar	April 6, 2014; WrestleMania XXX	25:12; Pinfall	Mercedes-Benz Superdome; New Orleans, Louisiana	End of The Undertaker's WrestleMania win Streak.
Win	22–1	Bray Wyatt	March 29, 2015; WrestleMania 31	15:12; Pinfall	Levi's Stadium; Santa Clara, California	
Win	23–1	Shane McMahon	April 3, 2016; WrestleMania 32	30:05; Pinfall	AT&T Stadium; Arlington, Texas	This was a Hell in a Cell match.
Loss	23–2	Roman Reigns	April 2, 2017; WrestleMania 33	23:00; Pinfall	Camping World Stadium; Orlando, Florida	This was a No Holds Barred match.
Win	24–2	John Cena	April 8, 2018; WrestleMania 34	2:46; Pinfall	Mercedes-Benz Superdome; New Orleans, Louisiana	
Win	25–2	AJ Styles	March 25–26, 2020; WrestleMania 36	19:18; Burial	WWE Performance Center; Orlando, Florida	This was a Boneyard Match. The match was taped between March 25 and 26, and aired on April 4.
