= Suburban Commando =

1991 film by Burt Kennedy

- Theatrical release poster
- Directed by: Burt Kennedy
- Written by: Frank Cappello
- Produced by: Howard Gottfried
- Starring: Hulk Hogan; Christopher Lloyd; Shelley Duvall; Larry Miller
- Cinematography: Bernd Heinl
- Edited by: Terry Stokes
- Music by: David Michael Frank
- Production company: New Line Cinema
- Distributed by: New Line Cinema
- Release date: October 4, 1991
- Running time: 90 minutes
- Country: United States
- Language: English
- Budget: $11 million
- Box office: $8 million

Suburban Commando is a 1991 American science fiction action comedy film directed by Burt Kennedy, produced by Howard Gottfried, and written by Frank Cappello. The film stars Hulk Hogan, Christopher Lloyd, Shelley Duvall, and Larry Miller. Additionally, a young Elisabeth Moss briefly appears in her film debut, as does Mark Calaway.

The film was originally titled Urban Commando, and was intended for Danny DeVito and Arnold Schwarzenegger. When these two opted to make Twins (1988), the script was bought by New Line Cinema as the follow-up to another Hulk Hogan film, No Holds Barred.

In the film, an extraterrestrial warrior botches a part of his mission. He is subsequently instructed to take a vacation, and causes damages to his own control systems while reacting in frustration. He crash-lands on planet Earth, and finds himself stranded there until his spaceship recharges itself. He unintentionally gets his new landlords involved in conflicts with his foes.

== Plot ==
Interstellar warrior Shep Ramsey is on a mission to capture intergalactic despot General Suitor. The general has kidnapped planetary ruler President Hashina. Shep boards Suitor's flagship but is unable to rescue Hashina, who is killed by Suitor. Wounded by Hashina in the process, Suitor transforms into a berserk reptilian creature. Shep barely escapes, but is able to blow up the ship as he does so.

Because he failed to save the President, Shep's superior officer suggests he is "stressed out" and should take a vacation. Annoyed, Shep accidentally smashes his control systems and is forced to crash-land on Earth, where he will have to stay until his spaceship has repaired itself. Shep has little knowledge of Earth's customs, and his temper and sense of justice cause problems with the people he meets, especially a mime artist he tries to help in various comical fashions.

Charlie Wilcox is a weak-willed architect working for the fawning and hypocritical Adrian Beltz. His wife, Jenny, unsuccessfully encourages him to stand up for himself and tells Charlie to ask Beltz for a raise. To help out financially, she rents out Charlie's hobby shed as a vacation cabin, which Shep leases. Shep's appearance and behavior make Charlie nervous, and he begins to spy on his guest. He soon discovers Shep's advanced equipment and begins experimenting with it, not knowing that the power sources are traceable. Its whereabouts are tracked by Suitor's men, who send a pair of intergalactic bounty hunters Knuckles and Hutch after Shep. Shep also requires several rare crystals to fix his ship, the closest samples of which are in Beltz's office. Charlie helps Shep get into his boss's office during a company party before the bounty hunters corner them. After winning a furious fight, Shep and Charlie head home to repair the ship.

After the bounty hunters' defeat, Suitor, who has escaped the destruction of his ship, arrives on Earth. He takes Charlie's family hostage, forcing Charlie to lead him to Shep. To protect Charlie and his family, Shep decides to use a "lose to win" tactic by setting his ship to self-destruct and surrendering to Suitor in exchange for the release of the Wilcox family. Suitor then begins torturing Shep, enjoying himself before he intends to kill the warrior. Finding his courage, Charlie returns to help Shep and injures Suitor, who then turns into his monstrous form. Physically outmatched, Shep stuns Suitor with some electrical wires, and he and Charlie manage to escape the ship's explosion, which destroys Suitor for good.

Shep leaves Earth using the bounty hunters' ship. He takes Beltz's secretary, Margie, with him, hoping for a quiet family life. Charlie, in turn, has become bolder from his experiences; he appears in Beltz's office the following morning, shouting at his boss in front of witnesses, and finally quits his thankless job. Later, Charlie solves his final problem by using one of Shep's weapons to destroy an annoying set of traffic lights that never changed at the right time, receiving cheers from the other motorists.

== Cast ==
- Hulk Hogan as Shep Ramsey
- Christopher Lloyd as Charlie Wilcox
- Shelley Duvall as Jenny Wilcox
- Michael Faustino as Mark Wilcox
- Laura Mooney as Theresa Wilcox
- Larry Miller as Adrian Beltz
- Dennis Burkley as Deak
- Branscombe Richmond as Biker
- William Ball as General Suitor; his mutant form is played by Vincent Hammond; Frank Welker provided the uncredited vocals for Suitor's true form as aforementioned
- Jack Elam as Colonel Dustin "Dusty" McHowell
- Elisabeth Moss as Little Girl
- Tom Morga as Mime
- Jo Ann Dearing as Margie Tanen
- Roy Dotrice as Zanuck
- Tony Longo as Knuckles
- Mark Calaway as Hutch

== Production ==
Special effects technician Michael Colvin died in 1990 while testing a trap door for the movie.

== Reception ==
=== Box office ===
The film opened with $1.9 million. Overall, the film grossed a total of $8,002,361 in the United States. With a budget of $11 million, the film was a commercial failure.

=== Critical response ===
On Rotten Tomatoes the film has an approval rating of 15% based on 13 reviews.

Roger Ebert noted, "This is the second feature starring Hulk Hogan, the man who looks like a comic strip hero. Hogan's range is limited, but not as limited as the movies he's appeared in. Despite the fact that his public image is often aimed at children - there's a whole line of Hulk Hogan toys - his first film, No Holds Barred (1989) was surprisingly violent, sexist and blood-soaked. Now here's 'Suburban Commando', which is at least innocuous, but which gives the Hulkster so little to do that his fans may wonder why he bothered." Michael Wilmington opened his review for it in the Los Angeles Times by saying that all the main personnel were "likeable" but that "all that likability combined, or even cubed, doesn't create any pressing reason to pay admission to "Suburban Commando" - unless you're an obsessed movie completist or a sudden cloudburst drives you to shelter." Stephen Holden of The New York Times, noted that despite the fact that it "has little narrative continuity, it is well paced and has an amusingly sour performance by Larry Miller as the kind of boss you love to hate."
