= Anzu Lawson =

American actress

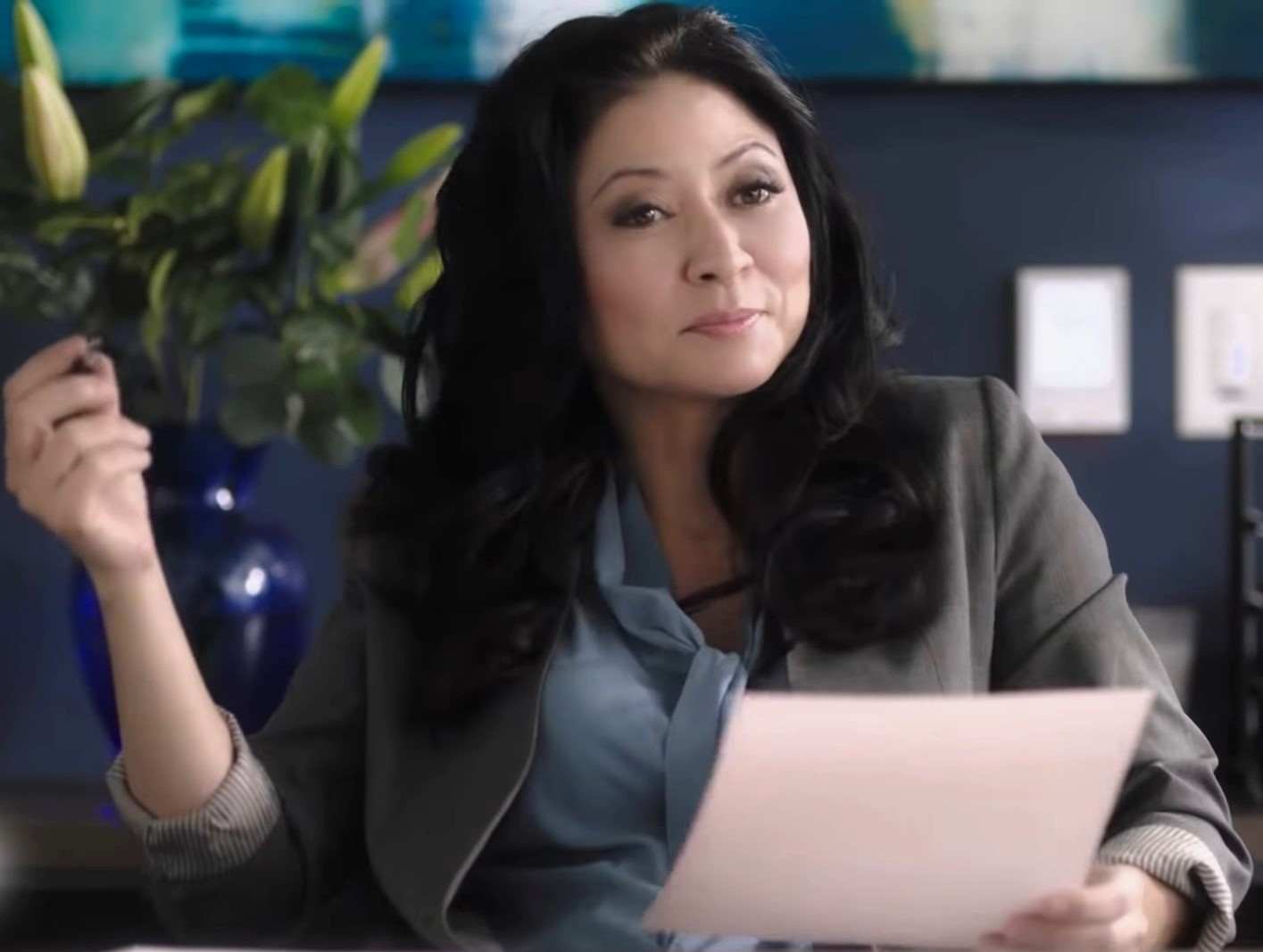
Lawson as Principal Lee on Guilty Party in 2017.

Anzu Lawson is an American actress, singer, songwriter, comedian, playwright, director and screenwriter.

== Music ==
Lawson was signed to Japanese a label where she reached number 1 on the Japanese Billboard charts with her cover of the single "The Rose" on Avex Records. She also reached number 1 on the European Dance charts with her single "Sweet Clarity" with a project called Aquabox produced by Lee Curreri. She has also sung on multiple movie soundtracks produced by Harry Gregson-Williams, Heitor Pereira and Hans Zimmer such as The Chronicles of Narnia, Spy Game, The Da Vinci Code, Sinbad, and Illegal Tender. She also wrote the song "I Am Onto You" for No Way Back, starring Russell Crowe and directed by Frank Cappello.

Her first screen test was at age 8 to play Mako's granddaughter for an East West Players film production and she starred in her first American movie opposite Viggo Mortensen in American Yakuza, directed by Frank Cappello. Frank Cappello also directed the dark comedy He Was A Quiet Man, where he cast Anzu opposite Christian Slater, to play his neighbor. She was nominated "Best Actress" for her role as Yoko Ono in 2014 at the Hollywood Fringe Festival in the musical Rock and Roll's Greatest Lovers.

== Comedy ==
As a stand-up comic, Anzu performs in comedy festivals as well as The Hollywood and Brea Improv, The Laugh Factory, The Ha-Ha Café, The Comedy Store and The IceHouse Pasadena.

== Filmography ==
Lawson's TV and film credits are below:

=== TV ===
Year	TV Show	Role	Notes
2026	Baki-Dou: The Invincible Samurai	Sabuko Tokugawa, Newscaster (voices)	Unknown episodes
2025	Law & Order	Dr. Nancy Willis	Episode: "A Perfect Family"
2025	My Happy Marriage	General Store Shop Keeper (voice)	2 episodes
2023	Manifest	Kimiko Mikami	Episode: "Threshold"
2023	Heavenly Delusion	Director (voice)	4 episodes
2023	The Blacklist	Mariko Ito	
2022	Black Rock Shooter: Dawn Fall	Strength (voice)	5 episodes
2020	Mickey and the Roadster Racers	Michiko Duck (voice), Additional Voices	Episode: "Hanami Hijinks/Happy Harajuku Helpers"
2017	Guilty Party	Principal Lee	9 episodes
2017	The Young and the Restless	Dr. Lang	4 episodes
2017	NCIS: Los Angeles	Nurse	3 episodes
2017	Fuller House		
2016	Gortimer Gibbon's Life on Normal Street	Miss Tran	2 episodes
2016	Broke A$$ Rich Kid		
2016	CSI: Cyber		
2015	Hand of God		
2015	Gypsi	Ann Dupree	2 episodes
2015	Mom		
2015	Cristela		
2014	Revenge		
2014	Ray Donovan		
2010	'Til Death		
2010	Make It or Break It		
2009	Criminal Minds		
2008	Without A Trace		
2007	Mind of Mencia		
2005	The King of Queens		
1996	Goode Behavior		
1994	Hot Line		
1992	Full House		

=== Film ===
Year	Film	Role	Notes
2020	Caged	Shannon	
2016	The Perfect Match	Sophia	
2015	The Viking and the Pendulum	Isi	Short
2013	Sweet Talk	Suzi Yamagutchi	
2010	What Would Jesus Do?	Waitress	
2007	He Was a Quiet Man	Nancy Felt	
2006	All In	Asian Player 5	
1995	Best of the Best 3: No Turning Back	Karen Banning	
1994	The Shadow	Concubine	
1993	American Yakuza	Yuko	

=== Video games ===
Year	Game	Role
2026	Starfield: Terran Armada	Sehoy Baker
2024	Dead Rising Deluxe Remaster	Jo Slade
2020	Ghost of Tsushima	Ankshar Khatun/The Eagle
2013	Killer Instinct	Black Orchid
