= Honeymoon Phase =

The term honeymoon phase may refer to:

- The Honeymoon Phase, a 2019 sci-fi horror film
- Goodbye Honeymoon Phase, a 2019 EP by Kitten
