= Sweet Talk (film) =

- Directed by: Terri Hanauer
- Written by: Peter Lefcourt
- Produced by: Linda L. Miller
- Starring: Natalie Zea; Jeffrey Vincent Parise
- Cinematography: Marco Fargnoli
- Edited by: Michael X. Flores
- Music by: Emanuele Arnone; Dino Herrmann
- Production company: Sweet Talk Productions
- Release date: 2 March 2013 (Cinequest Film Festival)
- Running time: 92 minutes
- Country: United States
- Language: English

Sweet Talk is a 2013 American adventure drama film directed by Terri Hanauer, starring Natalie Zea and Jeffrey Vincent Parise.

== Cast ==
- Natalie Zea as Delilah
- Jeffrey Vincent Parise as Samson
- John Glover as Professor / Count
- Lindsay Hollister as Ginny
- Karen Austin as Newsvender / Nurse
- Time Winters as Silent Man
- Anzu Lawson as Suzi Yamagutchi
- Andre Myers as Marcus
- Devion Andrez Coleman as Tremayne

== Reception ==
Annlee Ellingson of the Los Angeles Times wrote that while Zea "gives a natural performance amid a neighborhood of painful stereotypes", she "doesn’t adjust her cadence, let alone accent, for the historical flashbacks, bringing a modern sensibility that limits the effectiveness of these scenes", while Parise is "reduced to talking to a pet bird to explain his emotions."

Joe Leydon of Variety called the film a "borderline embarrassing vanity project that brings out the worst in TV vet Peter Lefcourt" and wrote that Zea and Parise "bring impressive measures of conviction to laughable dialogue".

Gabe Toro of IndieWire gave the film a grade of "D-" and called it "very cheap, wholly unconvincing, and loaded with dull narration.".
