= American Yakuza =

1993 film directed by Frank Cappello

- UK DVD cover
- Directed by: Frank Cappello
- Screenplay by: John Allen Nelson; Max Strom
- Story by: Takashige Ichise
- Produced by: Michael Leahy; Aki Komine
- Starring: Viggo Mortensen; Ryo Ishibashi; Michael Nouri; Franklyn Ajaye; Yuji Okumoto; Anzu Lawson; Robert Forster
- Cinematography: Richard Clabaugh
- Edited by: Sonny Baskin
- Music by: David C. Williams
- Production companies: First Look International; NEO Motion Pictures; Ozala Productions; Tohokushinsha Film
- Distributed by: RLJE Films (U.S.)
- Release dates: December 22, 1993 (Japan); February 14, 1995 (Japan)
- Running time: 95 minutes
- Countries: United States; Japan
- Languages: English; Japanese

American Yakuza is a 1993 crime action film directed by Frank Cappello, from a screenplay by John Allen Nelson and Max Strom, and starring Viggo Mortensen and Ryo Ishibashi. The film is about an American FBI agent (Mortensen) who goes undercover to infiltrate a Japanese Yakuza clan, which is at war with the mafia. It was released on December 22, 1993.

== Plot ==
American FBI agent David Brandt is working undercover under the identity of Nick Davis, a former convict who died in solitary confinement, at a warehouse in Los Angeles that the Tendo crime family owns in order to infiltrate their operations. After Brandt saves the life of one of the family's leaders, Shuji Sawamoto, Sawamoto welcomes him into the criminal organization. As part of his introduction, Sawamoto takes Brandt to witness the execution of Okazai, an alleged traitor, via woodchipper then stops the execution at the last minute. After Sawamoto and Brandt leave the scene, the man is shot by the remaining Yakuza members. For his first assignment, Brandt is tasked with overseeing a meeting between Sawamoto and Dino Campanela, who Sawamoto believes organized the assassination attempt. Campanela denies involvement in the attack, he orders his underlings, to wipe out the Tendo family. Later, Sawamoto invites Brandt over for a family meal; Brandt is crude and unfamiliar with Japanese customs, commenting on the dining arrangement by saying, "I thought you guys ate on the floor or something." Kazuo, one of Sawamoto's men, is immediately suspicious of Brandt, and comments on him being too tan for someone who allegedly spent the last year in solitary confinement. Brandt claims that he is a quarter Apache in response. Tensions reach a boiling point with Kazuo after Brandt refers to Sawamoto by a nickname, and Sawamoto has to intervene before the two get into a physical altercation.

Later, Brandt meets up with Sam, a fellow FBI agent, and the two debrief on the investigation. Sam reveals that Okazaki was also an FBI agent and was murdered by the Yakuza. Before Brandt leaves, Sam instructs him to "do whatever it takes" to remain in the good graces of the Tendo family. After Brandt leaves, he discovers that one of the Yakuza members is following him and confronts Sawamoto. During the confrontation, Sawamoto comments on Brandt's poor manners, and Brandt returns the samurai sword Sawamoto lost during the assassination attempt.

At the FBI office, Sam and the director, Littmann, discuss Brandt's role on the case. The director is suspicious of Brandt's loyalties, but Sam ardently defends Brandt, claiming that he will remain loyal because he has no family or personal ties outside of the FBI. The argument does little to persuade Littman.

In the meantime, Brandt and the Yakuza begin to bond as they travel to an arms deal in a warehouse. At the warehouse, the Yakuza members enter the building while Brandt stays outside to serve as the getaway driver. The arms deal turns out to be an FBI sting set up by Brandt's office. Brandt is unaware of the sting operation, nor do the FBI agents know that Brandt is an undercover agent and attempt to apprehend him. Although Brandt announces that he is an FBI agent, the FBI agents continue to fire on him. Brant fires back and non-fatally shoots one of the agents before escaping.

Brandt and the surviving Yakuza members recover the money and report the incident to Sawamoto. Sawamoto rewards Brandt with a large, but empty, house. Brandt looks despondently around the room. When Sawamoto asks if the house is not to his liking, Brandt comments on the house being a lot of space for one person. Sawamoto says that that might change soon.

When Brandt meets up with Sam, Sam is furious that Brandt shot three FBI agents. Brandt tells Sam to take him off the case if he is displeased with his work. Sam refuses and informs Brandt that Littman is suspicious of Brandt's loyalties. When Sam asks him about this, Brandt refuses to give a straight answer.

The next time Brandt returns to his new house, Yuko is in his living room and explains that she is his interior decorator. Brandt asks if she works for Sawamoto. She denies working for Sawamoto and says that she is his goddaughter.

Back at Campanela's house, Campanela and Vic, discuss Vic's place in the Mafia. Vic tells Campanela that he wants respect; Campanela says he will get respect after he takes out the Tendo family.

In the next scene, Sawamoto and Brandt are at a nightclub discussing how to further the interest of the Yakuza. Brandt mentions that he has a friend who works with Border Patrol who may be willing to assist the Yakuza in importing contraband. Sawamoto expresses interest in meeting with Brandt's friend, and Brandt agrees to arrange a meeting. Sawamoto notices Brandt staring at Yuko from across the room and encourages him to go speak with her. Brandt does, and the two slow dance. When Brandt attempts to pull her in, she pulls away. Brandt asks if he has stepped on her foot or if his breath bothers her, and she gently informs him that it is because they are in public. Back at the table, Aya is talking to Sawamoto. Brandt asks if they are a couple. Yuko confirms that they are "very special" to each other, but that they will never marry for Aya's safety. Brandt expresses disagreement with their decision and says that he would not want to hide his happiness like that. Yuko agrees and allows Brandt to dance closely with her.

Sam, who is undercover as Border Patrol agent Bill Jenkins, meets with Brandt, Sawamoto, and several Yakuza members in the middle of the desert. Although Sawamoto expresses concerns about Jenkins, he trusts Brandt's judgment.

Back in Brandt's home, Yuko is working on decorating the living room while Brandt watches from the couch. While the couple are kissing on the couch, Kazuo knocks on the door and takes Brandt to Sawamoto's house, where Brandt officially joins the Yakuza. When Brandt returns home, he and Yuko have sex.

The next morning while out on a walk, the same FBI agents who attacked Brandt at the sting shove him into an unmarked car and bring him to the FBI office. Littman informs Brandt that Campanela's men are planning to exterminate the Yakuza in the area and the FBI is going to allow them to do so. Brandt protests and storms out of the office. Sam follows and gives him plane tickets to Hawaii to wait out the executions. Brandt rushes back to his house where two of Campanela's men are waiting to ambush him. Although he kills both attackers, he is unable to save Yuko, who bleeds to death while he holds her body. Meanwhile, almost all of the other Yakuza members are assassinated except Sawamoto. Brandt meets Sawamoto and the two attack Campanela and his men that evening as they celebrate exterminating the Yakuza. During the ensuing gunfight, Sawamoto is fatally wounded. Brandt reveals that he is an undercover FBI agent while Sawamoto is dying. Sawamoto takes the news well and asks Brandt what his real name is. When Brandt tells him, Sawamoto says he likes Nick better. Campanela enters the room and shoots Brandt, who then defenestrates Campanela, killing him. Brandt clutches to Sawamoto, who tells him they will be reunited in the next life before dying. As the FBI start to infiltrate the compound, Brandt picks up Sawamoto's body and brings it downstairs. The movie ends with Brandt carrying Sawamoto's body outside and past Sam.

== Cast ==
- Viggo Mortensen as Nick Davis / David Brandt
- Ryo Ishibashi as Shuji Sawamoto
- Michael Nouri as Dino Campanela
- Franklyn Ajaye as Sam
- Yuji Okumoto as Kazuo
- Anzu Lawson as Yuko
- Robert Forster as Littman
- Nicky Katt as Vic
- John Fujioka as Isshin Tendo
- James Taenaka as Taka
- Toni Naples as Mrs. Campanela
- Saiko Isshiki as Aya
- Fritz Mashimo as Okazaki
- Joey Ciccone as Rudy
- Nathan Jung as Giant Yakuza

== Production ==
American Yakuza along with Blue Tiger was announced as a part of a series of co-productions between First Look Studios and Japanese company Ozla Productions. The films in question were intended to be a mixture of Japanese and American cultures in the action-adventure genre. These films were part of a short lived venture by Toei Company to produce higher end V-Cinema releases under the imprint V-America with Toei partnering with international partners as to ensure their financial exposure was the same as one of their own locally produced V-Cinema projects.

Filming took place in Los Angeles from June 18 through July 1 of 1993.

== Release ==
The film premiered in Japan on December 22, 1993. In February 1994 at the American Film Market, it was announced Overseas Filmgroup had secured a deal with HBO to premier the film on March 10, 1994. American Yakuza was released on home video on February 14, 1995.

Due to the successful sales of American Yakuza the company moved forward on another film centering around the Yakuza with No Way Back. The unrelated film Back to Back, also starring Ryo Ishibashi, was also released as American Yakuza 2.

== Reception ==
TV Guide wrote that director Frank Cappello did "an adequate job of weaving a relatively intricate storyline together, while delivering numerous explosive, action-packed sequences". The reviewer said that Viggo Mortensen excelled in his performance, and Ryo Ishibashi was impressive in his role. They concluded that overall, American Yakuza "is a surprisingly powerful portrayal of the loyalties that exist in the underworld, where violence and betrayal are a way of life."

In a review for the Movie Gazette, Anton Bitel wrote that after considering Viggo Mortensen's acting in this 1993 film and how he was mostly known as Aragorn in the Lord of the Rings films, American Yakuza "will leave viewers wondering why Mortensen's talents were not generally recognized a lot earlier." He also noted that one of the film's ironies was that, when the Mafia takes on the Yakuza in the film and "boast(s) of their 'American drive and know-how'", they forget that a century earlier they were just as eager as the Yakuza "to get a foothold in this country". Bitel feels that "American Yakuza is in effect 'The Godfather: the next Generation' – an immigrant saga of family, blood and assimilation that just happens to be set in the world of organized crime." He found flaws in that parts of the film "have the look of a rock video" and overall suffers from needing a larger budget. He concludes with praise for the acting, twisting plotline, and the carefully restrained violence.
