= List of Penguindrum episodes =

Penguindrum (輪るピングドラム, Mawaru Pingudoramu; Spinning Penguindrum) is a 2011 Japanese anime television series produced by Brain's Base. The series is directed and co-written by Kunihiko Ikuhara and aired in Japan from July 8 to December 23, 2011. The series revolves around the Takakura twins Kanba and Shoma whose dead younger sister Himari was brought back to life by a strange spirit who resides in a penguin-shaped hat. However, in exchange for extending her life, the spirit tasks them to seek out an item known as the Penguin Drum with assistance from a trio of strange penguins.

Penguindrum's two opening themes are performed by Etsuko Yakushimaru. "Nornir" (ノルニル, Noruniru), is used for episodes 1–14, and "Boys, Come Back to Me" (少年よ我に帰れ, Shōnen yo Ware ni Kaere) from episode 15 onwards. Eight pieces of music are used for ending themes. "Dear Future" by Coaltar of the Deepers is used for episodes 1–12, with a special performance by Yui Horie for episode 10. Episodes 13 onwards use several covers of ARB performed by Marie Miyake, Yui Watanabe and Miho Arakawa as the fictional band "Triple H": "Grey Wednesday" (灰色の水曜日, Hai-iro no Suiyōbi) is used for episodes 13, 15 and 18; "Bad News (Kuroi Yokan)" (Bad News (黒い予感)) for episodes 14 and 17; and "Ikarechimattaze!!" (イカレちまったぜ!!) for episode 16, "Hide and Seek" for episode 19, "Private Girl" for episode 20, "Tamashii Kogashite" (魂こがして; "Scorching Soul") for episode 21 and "Heroes ~Eiyū-tachi~" (HEROES ～英雄たち~) for episode 23.

== Episodes ==
All episodes were co-written by Kunihiko Ikuhara and Takayo Ikami. Episode 16 was also co-written with Shingo Kaneko and Tomohiro Furukawa. In intertitles, the episodes are referred to as ordered "stations" (from "1st Station" up to "24th Station").

No.	Title	Storyboarder(s)	Directed by	Animation supervisor(s)	Original release date
1	"The Bell of Fate Tolls"; Transliteration: "Unmei no Beru ga Naru" (Japanese: 運命のベルが鳴る)	Kunihiko Ikuhara	Shōko Nakamura	Terumi Nishii	July 8, 2011
Three siblings, Shōma, Kanba and Himari Takakura are living together, despite the fact Himari was given only a few months to live by the doctor. The three visit an aquarium to see the penguins, where Shōma buys her a queen penguin hat, but Himari collapses and later dies in the hospital. As the brothers mourn, they are surprised to see Himari suddenly spring back to life and cured of her condition, possessed by a spirit which has decided to extend her life, though she returns to normal when her penguin hat falls off. The next day, the siblings receive a shipment of frozen things, which are later revealed to be a trio of strange penguins that no one besides them can see. Just then, the hat possesses Himari again, explaining that she has extended her life but in exchange wants the brothers to obtain something known as the Penguin Drum. As Shōma sleeps that night, it appears that Kanba ends up kissing Himari as she sleeps but it can't be certain since the scene cuts before their lips make contact.
2	"Risky Survival Strategy"; Transliteration: "Kiken na Seizon Senryaku" (Japanese: 危険な生存戦略)	Mitsue Yamazaki	Mitsue Yamazaki	Takahiro Kagami, Haruka Kamohara	July 15, 2011
The Penguin Spirit appears again and tells Shōma and Kanba to board a train and find a girl named Ringo Oginome who may possess the Penguindrum. With Ringo attending a girls' school, Shōma and Kanba send in their penguins to follow her. The brothers end up following her to a lingerie store, where they spot her maneuvering round the outside of a building in order to take a photo of something, which she shows to the brother's teacher, Keiju Tabuki. She then follows him home and hides out under his house, where the brothers conclude that she is a stalker, and pulls out a diary which allegedly foretells destined events.
3	"Then Devour Me Courageously"; Transliteration: "Soshite Karei ni Watashi o Tabete..." (Japanese: そして華麗に私を食べて…)	Katsunori Shibata	Katsunori Shibata	Miyuki Nakamura	July 22, 2011
As Ringo contemplates making a special curry for Tabuki, Shōma and Kanba, having been reminded about Himari's fate if they don't cooperate, break into Ringo's house to search for the Penguindrum. After just managing to hide from her when she comes back home to prepare her curry, the brothers follow Ringo to Tabuki's house, where she finds another woman living with him. Ringo swaps the curry she was preparing with her own and runs off, where she runs into Himari who invites her to her house, much to the brothers' surprise. After eating together, Ringo returns home and confirms the events laid out in her diary.
4	"Descension of a Princess"; Transliteration: "Maiochiru Himegimi" (Japanese: 舞い落ちる姫君)	Shingo Kaneko	Shingo Kaneko	Masafumi Tamura, Yū Shindō	July 29, 2011
As Ringo gets help from Himari preparing lunch for a 'date' with Tabuki at the park, Kanba tasks Shōma to go with her and look through her bag for her diary, believing it may be related to the Penguindrum. When they reach the park, they encounter a runaway skunk who runs off after squirting Ringo in stink. After changing clothes, Ringo and Shōma meet up with Tabuki, who brings along the woman Ringo saw him with, an actress named Yuri Tokikago. Come lunchtime, Ringo's prepared lunch gets eaten by crows, leaving her in the shadow of Yuri's picnic. In order to fulfil a 'first kiss' note in her diary, Ringo plans to jump into the pond and have Tabuki save her. However, the skunk appears again and knocks her in, forcing Shōma to save her instead and perform CPR on her, though Ringo believes Tabuki to be the one who did it. Later that evening, a girl that Kanba met up with earlier is pushed down the escalator of a train station, completing the description in Ringo's diary.
5	"That's Why I Do That"; Transliteration: "Dakara Boku wa Sore o Suru no sa" (Japanese: だから僕はそれをするのさ)	Kunihiko Ikuhara	Kōichiro Sohtome	Mitsuko Baba, Terumi Nishii	August 5, 2011
Asami Kubo, the girl who was pushed down the escalator, is questioned by a woman named Masako Natsume, who then fires a red ball at her head, causing her to remember nothing about the incident. Kanba hears that his uncle is planning to sell their house and goes to see a strange person to obtain the money to buy it. Meanwhile, Shōma and Himari find Ringo, who had a bad day, and invite her back to their place. There, Shōma asks Ringo about her diary, which she claims is a Diary of Fate which describes her future. Both she and Shōma are summoned by the Penguin Hat, who orders Shōma to retrieve the diary, but Ringo breaks free and throws away the hat which lands on a truck, causing Himari to fall dead again. As Kanba goes to retrieve the hat, he recalls what happened 9 years ago when he went with his father into a typhoon when Himari was ill with a fever. After a tough struggle, Kanba manages to retrieve the hat and return it to Himari.
6	"You & I Are Connected by M"; Transliteration: "Emu de Tsunagaru Watashi to Anata" (Japanese: Mでつながる私とあなた)	Mitsue Yamazaki	Mitsue Yamazaki	Tomomi Ishikawa	August 19, 2011
Kanba goes to see Asami only to find she has forgotten all about him. He tries getting some information out of two other girls, but they are attacked by Natsume's red balls, causing them to lose their memories. Meanwhile, Shoma reluctantly follows Ringo's orders in order to let her have her diary, having him move a lot of stuff over to Tabuki's apartment, but she ends up coming down with a fever. It is revealed that Ringo's late sister, Momoka, used to date Tabuki and Ringo felt that, in order to be accepted by her family, she would have to become Momoka by fulfilling what was written in her diary. Despite her fever, Ringo sneaks off to under Tabuki's house to spend her 'first night' with him, while Natsume is shown to have her own penguin, discussing 'Project M' with someone.
7	"Tamahomare Girl"; Transliteration: "Tamahomare-suru Onna" (Japanese: タマホマレする女)	Jun Matsumoto	Tetsuo Ichimura	Aiko Sonobe, Takahiro Kagami	August 26, 2011
Tabuki invites Ringo to see one of Yuri's plays with him, followed by dinner, where Yuri invites her and Shoma to a party. At the party, Yuri announces that she and Tabuki are engaged, but Ringo remains determined, dragging Shoma to her school to help her make a love potion, which is foiled by Shoma's penguin. Determined to complete her mission, Ringo sneaks into Tabuki's room one night with the intention of getting impregnated by him.
8	"Even If Your Love is a Lie..."; Transliteration: "Kimi no Koi ga Uso de mo Boku wa" (Japanese: 君の恋が嘘でも僕は)	Shōko Nakamura	Toshinori Fukushima	Masafumi Tamura, Yū Shindō	September 2, 2011
Ringo attempts to make a move on Tabuki only to find he is not there as his roof had a leak. The next day, Tabuki tells Shoma that he is moving in with Yuri, which does not settle well with Ringo, who later discovers her father consorting with another family. Undeterred, she visits Tabuki's new apartment while Yuri is on tour, using a special cake to drug Tabuki while she pretends to be Yuri and attempts to rape him. However, Shoma manages to regain his consciousness and delay Ringo enough before Yuri returns home. As Shoma tries to stop Ringo from taking things any further, her diary is knocked off and is later ripped in half by a passing motorcyclist when she tries to retrieve it. As the shock leads Ringo to walk into the path of an oncoming car, Shoma manages to push her out of the way but is hit himself.
9	"The World of Ice"; Transliteration: "Kōri no Sekai" (Japanese: 氷の世界)	Nobuyuki Takeuchi	Nobuyuki Takeuchi	Nobuyuki Takeuchi	September 9, 2011
Himari has a strange dream in which she meets a man named Sanetoshi, who shows her various books containing her memories. In elementary school, she formed a group called Triple-H with her best friends, Hibari and Hikari. When she argued with her mother over buying a wrong ribbon, her mother became scarred from a falling mirror, she and her friends tried to kill a koi for its blood to heal her mother. She left elementary school due to her illness while her friends went on to become idols. Upon waking up after vaguely recollecting a soulmate she once had, Himari hears from Ringo about Shoma's accident.
10	"Because I Love Him"; Transliteration: "Datte Suki Dakara" (Japanese: だって好きだから)	Keiji Gotoh	Keiji Gotoh	Keiji Gotoh	September 16, 2011
Shoma wakes up in hospital with supposedly minor injuries, keeping quiet about what happened between him and Ringo from his siblings. As Ringo explains what happened to her diary to him, Natsume disguises herself as a nurse and kidnaps Shoma, demanding the other half of the diary from Kanba and Ringo in exchange for his life. Deciding to leave the diary half with Ringo, Kanba goes to find Shoma, while Ringo is told to surrender the diary herself. After luring Kanba into a trap and kissing him, Natsume escapes but is confronted by another person in a penguin hat, whom Natsume identifies as Mario.
11	"You Have Finally Realized It"; Transliteration: "Yōyaku Kimi wa Kigatsuita no sa" (Japanese: ようやく君は気がついたのさ)	Kunihiko Ikuhara, Shingo Kaneko, Mitsue Yamazaki	Mitsue Yamazaki	Miyuki Nakamura, Terumi Nishii	September 23, 2011
Kanba goes to confront Natsume about the memory-erasing balls and why she desires the diary, unaware that she only has half of it. Meanwhile, Ringo is still determined to complete Project M with or without the diary, making a love potion to give to Tabuki, which actually seems to work. As Ringo decides she can not go through with it, Yuri helps her come to the realisation that she is actually in love with Shoma. As Penguin Himari brings Shoma and Ringo into a Survival Strategy meeting, Ringo tells them about the day 16 years ago when Momoka died and she was born, which turns out to be the day Shoma and Kanba were also born.
12	"The Wheel That Spins Us Round"; Transliteration: "Bokutachi o Meguru Wa" (Japanese: 僕たちを巡る輪)	Kunihiko Ikuhara, Katsunori Shibata	Katsunori Shibata	Mitsuko Baba, Takahiro Kagami, Shōko Nakamura	September 30, 2011
Kanba goes home and is called by Sanetoshi claiming that Himari will die once more. Shoma goes into detail of what happened 16 years ago, as Shoma and Kanba's parents were high-ranking members of a religious cult and were responsible for a terrible incident (the real-life Tokyo subway sarin attack, which took place on March 20, 1995) which killed Momoka. Himari still possessed loses her strength and tells Shoma and Ringo to acquire the Penguin Drum and to stop "them". Himari is then transferred to a hospital and Kanba is called by Shoma. He arrives to find Himari lying dead and tries to once more make a pact to give her his life, but it does not work as she says she must leave to "The Destination of Fate". Just as Himari seems to be truly dead, Sanetoshi appears.
13	"Our Crime & Punishment"; Transliteration: "Boku to Kimi no Tsumi to Batsu" (Japanese: 僕と君の罪と罰)	Kunihiko Ikuhara, Tomohiro Furukawa	Tetsuo Ichimura	Terumi Nishii	October 7, 2011
Sanetoshi offers Kanba a special medicine to revive Himari, though mentions there will be a steep price in return. Kanba recalls three years ago when he and Shoma learned about their parents being criminals. Later, Sanetoshi contacts Natsume, who had also made a contract with him to save Mario, telling her who has the other half of Ringo's Diary. Meanwhile, Ringo talks to Tabuki, who helps put her worries to rest.
14	"Princess of Lies"; Transliteration: "Usotsuki Hime" (Japanese: 嘘つき姫)	Kunihiko Ikuhara, Mitsue Yamazaki	Mitsue Yamazaki	Kumi Ishii, Miyuki Nakamura	October 14, 2011
Yuri, after breaking off an affair with one of her co-stars, feels a longing for a certain someone. Meanwhile, Shoma is ignoring Ringo, feeling she will never be able to forgive him for what his parents did, and tells her they shouldn't see each other again. As Kanba tries to raise more money to pay for Himari's medicine, he is confronted by Natsume, who questions his feelings for Himari. As Ringo becomes depressed over what happened with Shoma, she is picked up by Yuri, who takes her to a hot spring inn. It is revealed that Yuri was close to Momoka, and even attracted to her, because she was the only person who would call her beautiful, leading to her drugging and attempting to rape Ringo to make her into Momoka. It is also revealed that Yuri was the motorcyclist who stole half of Ringo's diary some time ago.
15	"Saving the World"; Transliteration: "Sekai o Sukuu Mono" (Japanese: 世界を救う者)	Kunihiko Ikuhara, Katsunori Shibata	Katsunori Shibata	Yūko Kusumoto, Yū Shindō	October 21, 2011
Yuri holds Ringo into her room that coincidentally is next to a room Shoma is staying with a classmate on a field trip. Shoma rushes to rescue her after figuring this but he trips and falls unconscious after bumping his head. Meanwhile, Yuri reminisces about her father, a famous artist who used to tell her she was ugly and convinced her to let him use his chisel on her as he claimed that by only making her "beautiful" he would be able to love her. Yuri started getting seriously injured by her father and she makes friends with her classmate Momoka who claims that her diary has the power of transferring fates in exchange for a price. Back to the present, Natsume appears before Yuri to steal the half of the diary in her possession and despite seemingly successful, it is revealed that she was tricked by Yuri and left with a forgery. After Shoma awakes, Yuri reveals to him that she has half of the diary and just like Momoka saved her from her abusing father with the power of the diary, Yuri is determined to use it to bring her back to life.
16	"Immortal Man"; Transliteration: "Shinanai Otoko" (Japanese: 死なない男)	Kunihiko Ikuhara, Shingo Kaneko, Tomohiro Furukawa	Shingo Kaneko	Tomomi Ishikawa, Takahiro Kagami	October 28, 2011
After realizing that she was tricked by Yuri, Masako reminisces about her grandfather, a powerful business tycoon who expelled her father claiming that he was not strong enough to be allowed a place in the Natsume family. After dreaming countless times about having him killed, Masako rejoiced when her grandfather inadvertently poisoned himself to death by eating ill prepared Fugu. Masako since then assumed control of her family's corporation but was sad that her father had never returned home, until somehow her grandfather's spirit possessed Mario's body and forced her to eat the same poison that killed him to protect her brother, but Sanetoshi appears to save her life. Later, Masako sees Kanba hanging out with the same elusive men who took her father away and Sanetoshi asks Masako to join them in his plan to "put the world back on track" but she promptly refuses.
17	"Those Who Cannot Be Forgiven"; Transliteration: "Yurusarezaru Mono" (Japanese: 許されざる者)	Kunihiko Ikuhara, Shōko Nakamura, Masahiro Aizawa	Shōko Nakamura, Masahiro Aizawa	Shōko Nakamura, Masahiro Aizawa	November 4, 2011
The Takakura siblings are enjoying Takoyaki together and happy with the news that Himari will soon be released from hospital when the magic hat possesses Himari again for another Survival Strategy meeting with her brothers and insists that their ordeal will not be over until the Penguin-Drum is retrieved. Meanwhile, Yuri and Tabuki reminisces about their childhood days with Momoka and while Yuri is unable to forgive the siblings for their parents' crime, Tabuki tries to dissuade her. In the next day, Himari leaves by herself with Ringo for shopping much to Kanba and Shouma's despair as they are informed that she must take another dose of her medicine before sunset. While the brothers look for Himari, Ringo receives a call from Yuri who invites her and Himari for a meeting. Yuri waits for Himari, but is intercepted by Masako instead, and the two start fighting for the two halves of the diary, while Himari and Ringo are approached by Tabuki, who invites them to a construction site where he claims he will finally bring punishment to the Takakura family.
18	"So, I Want You to Be Here for My Sake"; Transliteration: "Dakara Watashi no Tame ni Itehoshii" (Japanese: だから私のためにいてほしい)	Shigeyasu Yamauchi	Shigeyasu Yamauchi	Terumi Nishii	November 11, 2011
Tabuki reminisces about how he injured his own hands in despair of being relinquished by his mother as she only cared about his younger brother who was a much better pianist than him. After Tabuki traps Ringo at an elevator and holds Himari hostage, he phones Kanba demanding to bring his father to him. Kanba arrives alone to meet them, claiming he has no idea where his father is and finds Himari hung over into a construction bucket. Tabuki does not believe him and Ringo decides to call the police, but Kanba asks her to not do it and she calls Shouma instead. Tabuki reveals that Himari's brother is receiving money from his father's organization to pay for her treatment, and remembering about how Momoka had her hand severely injured to save him, Tabuki starts severing the wires holding the bucket one by one, claiming that the only way for Kanba to prevent Himari from falling to her death is by sacrificing his own hand to hold the final wire together when it snaps. Kanba does so and despite his pain, he claims he would never have his sister die. Himari than decides to jump by herself to spare Kanba's life, but Tabuki saves her from the fall after seeing in Kanba the same determination to protect his sister he saw in Momoka when she saved him. Shoma arrives soon later and the siblings reunite in tears while Tabuki makes his leave, meeting Yuri on the way who reprimands him. It is also shown that Yuri's showdown with Masako ended in a draw, as each one still holds a half of the diary.
19	"My Fated Person"; Transliteration: "Watashi no Unmei no Hito" (Japanese: 私の運命の人)	Keiji Gotoh	Keiji Gotoh	Keiji Gotoh, Kumi Ishii	November 18, 2011
After the incident at the construction site, Tabuki quit his job and leaves Yuri, while Kanba is praised by his parents for protecting Himari, claiming that once their true objective is reached, they will become together again. Kanba makes use of some money he got from them to throw a party for Himari with Shouma and Ringo to celebrate her return home, while Himari wonders about her conversation with Sanetoshi as she doubts that she will eventually be cured. He also has a conversation with Masako, who reaffirms her intentions to stop his plans. Masako then pays a visit to Himari and demands her to remember about her true past, as she claims Himari is not Kanba's real sister. She approaches her with a modified slingshot designed to restore forgotten memories, but is stopped by Kanba and Shouma who had just returned home. However, Himari manages to remember her past and realize that she indeed is not Kanba and Shouma's sister and it was her soulmate, who is actually Shouma that saved her.
20	"Thank You for Choosing Me"; Transliteration: "Erandekurete Arigatō" (Japanese: 選んでくれてありがとう)	Akemi Hayashi	Akemi Hayashi	Akemi Hayashi, Ikuo Kuwana, Yūko Kusumoto	November 25, 2011
Masako decides to leave the Takakuras alone, still not accepting the 'family' they have. As Himari has another conversation with Sanetoshi, Shouma confesses to Ringo that Himari is not actually his blood sister. Years ago, whilst his parents were organising to change the world with their organization, Shouma met the orphaned Himari whilst exploring his condo. Whilst she is initially passive of him, the two grew a friendship over an abandoned kitten they find, up until it ended up being taken away. When Shouma discovered that Himari had headed over to the 'Child Broiler', where unneeded children go to disappear from the world, he rushed over there to rescue her and chose her to become a part of her family (making him believe everything that has happened to Himari up until the present is all his fault). Back in the present, Kanba continues to converse with his parents about what needs to be done to change the world.
21	"The Door of Fate We Choose"; Transliteration: "Bokutachi ga Erabu Unmei no Doa" (Japanese: 僕たちが選ぶ運命のドア)	Kunihiko Ikuhara, Tomohiro Furukawa, Mitsue Yamazaki	Mitsue Yamazaki	Miyuki Nakamura, Yū Shindō	December 2, 2011
Ringo is approached by a journalist asking about the Takakura siblings, but she avoids him and warns Himari about him. Later that night, Himari, who was told by the same journalist about how Kanba have been collecting money for her treatment, trails him to the shop where he supposedly meet his parents just to find the place torn down and have a shocking revelation. Shouma is informed by the journalist about Kanba's involvement with the Kiga Group and tries to stop him by force with no success. Meanwhile, Tabuki and Yuri also reach the shop and just like Himari, find the skeletons of the Takakura couple before being attacked by an unknown assailant. Shouma, who finds that Kanba ordered the journalist to be killed in a car accident, and was informed by Sanetoshi that the medicine will not prolong Himari's life for long, informs her that they can't live as a family anymore and sends her to live with his uncle. Later the Kiga group, whose true leader is actually Kanba prepares themselves to make a large scale operation, and Himari, seen standing next to him, claims that she is determined to stop him at the cost of her life.
22	"Beautiful Casket"; Transliteration: "Utsukushii Hitsugi" (Japanese: 美しい棺)	Kunihiko Ikuhara, Tomohiro Furukawa, Mitsue Yamazaki, Shōko Nakamura	Tetsuo Ichimura	Takahiro Kagami, Tomomi Ishikawa, Shōko Nakamura, Miyuki Nakamura	December 9, 2011
Ringo stumbles on two girls dressed suspiciously standing before the Takakuras' house and finds that they are actually Himari's childhood friends Hibari and Hikari from the Double-H idol duo. They ask her to give Himari a present in return for the scarves she knit for them before leaving. Kanba learned from Sanetoshi that his medicine will not work on Himari anymore (she has built a resistance to it), and that according to him, she can only be saved after he fulfills his group's objective. Himari tries to dissuade him with no success and discovers that his hideout is situated under the aquarium where she first died. She prays for God to have Kanba saved in exchange for her life and falls lifeless on the ground. Yuri calls Ringo and returns her the half of the diary in her possession and stays beside an unconscious Tabuki at the hospital, who was stabbed by the attacker who was revealed to be Yuri's former lover and co-worker. Masako tries to convince Kanba to give up as the police are already aware of his plans and have a warrant on him, but he moves forward ignoring her pleas until they are surrounded, and he puts himself in harm's way to protect her. Injured and unconscious, Kanba is carried away by his comrades while Masako decides to confront the police by herself to cover his escape.
23	"Fate's Destination"; Transliteration: "Unmei No Itaru Basho" (Japanese: 運命の至る場所)	Kunihiko Ikuhara, Masahiro Aizawa, Shōko Nakamura, Tomohiro Furukawa, Katsunori Shibata	Masahiro Aizawa, Shōko Nakamura, Shingo Kaneko	Masahiro Aizawa, Kumi Ishii, Terumi Nishii, Mitsuko Baba, Katsunori Shibata (effects)	December 16, 2011
On the day of the terrorist attack, 16 years before, Sanetoshi is confronted by Momoka who was determined to stop him. Her spirit ends up splitting in two with each half being the penguin hats used by Himari and Mario, and Sanetoshi is divided into the two black rabbits that are always accompanying him. Back to the present, Shouma is informed that Himari's life is at its end and Ringo comforts him while Kanba is taken by Sanetoshi to a gravely injured Masako and brings her from the dead before his eyes. Despite Masako's pleas, Kanba leaves with Sanetoshi to continue his plan, carrying her half of the diary with himself. Shouma sees a vision of Himari asking him to stop Kanba. It seems that Himari kisses Shouma, but their faces are off screen. When Kanba comes to fetch her, Shouma is shot unconscious by him with a penguin bullet. Ringo is called by Kanba to the aquarium and a bomb explodes knocking her out. Sanetoshi watches her struggling to stop her half of the diary from being burned out and after she fails, he has Kanba burn the other half. Shouma wakes up and manages to reach Kanba determined to stop his plans.
24	"I Love You"; Transliteration: "Aishiteru" (Japanese: 愛してる)	Kunihiko Ikuhara, Mitsue Yamazaki, Shōko Nakamura, Tomohiro Furukawa	Kunihiko Ikuhara, Mitsue Yamazaki, Shōko Nakamura	Terumi Nishii, Yū Shindō, Shōko Nakamura, Katsunori Shibata and Keiji Gotoh (effects)	December 23, 2011
Ringo activates the fate-altering spell from the destroyed diary, having learned it from the present from Double-H. Shouma takes the burden of Ringo's sacrifice for himself, telling Ringo he loves her before vanishing, while Kanba sacrifices himself to resurrect Masako and Himari. The terrorist attack is stopped, and Himari, Ringo, and Masako awaken with no memory of the events or of Kanba and Shouma having ever existed. At home, Himari finds an old letter from Kanba and Shouma; she does not recognize it, and she is confused when the sight of it causes her to cry. Outside, Shouma and Kanba walk past as young children, accompanied by the four penguins.

== Home video releases ==
=== Japanese release ===
Toho
Vol.	Episodes	Bonus disc	Release date	Ref.
1	1, 2, 3	Waru ping Vol.1 disk	October 26, 2011	
2	4, 5, 6	Bonus CD + Privilege CD	November 23, 2011	
3	7, 8, 9	Bonus CD + Privilege CD	December 21, 2011	
4	10, 11, 12	Bonus CD + Privilege CD	January 25, 2012	
5	13, 14, 15	Bonus CD + Privilege CD	February 22, 2012	
6	16, 17, 18	Bonus CD + Privilege CD	March 28, 2012	
7	19, 20, 21	Bonus CD + Privilege CD	April 25, 2012	
8	22, 23, 24	Bonus CD + Privilege CD	May 23, 2012	

=== Italian release ===
Dynit
Vol.	Episodes	Bonus disc	Release date	Ref.
Blu-ray 1	1–6		January 30, 2013	
Blu-ray 2	7–12		February 27, 2013	
Blu-ray 3	13–18		April 4, 2013	
Blu-ray 4	19–24		May 15, 2013	
DVD Box	1-24		April 24, 2013	
