= 5 Card Stud (2002 film) =

2002 American film

- 5 Card Stud
- Directed by: Hank Saroyan
- Written by: Lawrence H. Toffler
- Produced by: Chantel Sausedo
- Starring: Khrystyne Haje; Lawrence H. Toffler; Brian Everett; Doris Hess; Steven Houska; Kevin McClatchy; Jeffrey Vincent Parise
- Cinematography: Bry Thomas Sanders
- Edited by: David B. Baron
- Distributed by: Warner Bros. Lightyear Entertainment
- Release dates: July 12, 2002 (Dances With Films Festival of the Unknowns)
- Running time: 96 minutes
- Country: United States
- Language: English

5 Card Stud is a 2002 American romance film directed by Hank Saroyan and starring Khrystyne Haje, Lawrence H. Toffler, Brian Everett, Doris Hess, Steven Houska, Kevin McClatchy, and Jeffrey Vincent Parise.

== Plot ==
A bartender with a fear of commitment has limited his social life to a weekly poker game with the guys. His best friend sets him up with a sure thing one night stand and the two fall in love.

== Home media ==
The film was released on DVD by Lightyear Video on 18 October 2005.

== Critical reception ==
Eric D. Snider on DVD Talk stated that the film "has the desperate, sad aura of a movie that was made by people who loved it but that is destined to find no love anywhere else", while a review from DVD Verdict criticized the film's screenplay and performances: "The movie's pretty lackluster—a lame attempt at ripping off better "boys being boys" romantic comedies like Beautiful Girls. [...] Only Khrystyne Haje (What did I say? Never again…) manages to infuse some life into her character." Meanwhile, Robert Koehler from Variety called it "a perfect example of everything that’s wrong with American indie filmmaking".
