= Jeffrey Vincent Parise =

American painter and actor

- Born: July 8, 1977 (age 49); United States
- Occupations: Actor; artist
- Years active: 1994–present
- Website: www.jeffreyvincentparise.com

Jeffrey Vincente Parise is an American actor and artist. Some of his more notable roles include Asmodeus in Supernatural, Carlos Rivera and Carlos' twin brother Joe Rivera on the ABC soap opera General Hospital, and Wayne in Anna Biller's horror-thriller film The Love Witch (2016).

== Career ==
=== Acting ===
Parise made his acting debut in 1994 on the television series Sisters where he played the role of Dwayne. After that he entered the Los Angeles theatre scene in a string of plays, including Jerusalem Avenue, written and directed by Christopher Joyce. He then appeared in many short and feature-length films and television series. His films include The Unscarred (2000), Over My Dead Body (2002), 5 Card Stud (2002), Don't Come Knocking (2005) directed by Wim Wenders, Land of Plenty (2004), Dark Reel (2008), Body Politic (2009), and The Face of Love (2013). In 2007, he landed a lead role of Tony in Callback: the Unmaking of Bloodstain, directed by Eric M. Wolfson, for which he won three Best Actor awards for his performance. In 2008 Parise wrote, directed, and starred in the short film Vincent & Lucian.

Parise has been active on television. He played Nick on the television series Cupid from 1998 to 1999, and he has guest-starred on Turks, Millennium, CSI: Crime Scene Investigation, CSI:NY (playing two different characters five years apart), Walker, Texas Ranger, Titans, NYPD Blue, Monk, Judging Amy, The District, Veronica Mars, Party Down, Burn Notice, and Castle. In 2007-2008 he was cast in Days of Our Lives playing the role of Detective Sullivan in 10 episodes. Parise joined the cast of General Hospital in 2013, playing the role of bad boy Carlos Rivera. He made his debut on September 19, 2013, and continued his run through 2016, after which he returned to the series as Carlos' twin brother, Joe Rivera. Parise appeared in the final episode of Mad Men, where he played Vince, the guru. Parise uttered the last spoken words of the iconic series.

Recent roles include Wayne in Anna Biller's acclaimed horror-thriller film The Love Witch, Carlos Camacho in the TV Series The Detour created by Jason Jones and Samantha Bee, and Asmodeus in the award-winning television series Supernatural.

=== Artist ===
Parise is an artist, who began painting in 1996. He got his book published, called "A Decade of Paintings 2000-2010", which contains his work, and writings from the people he has painted as well as from himself. He exhibits his works in Los Angeles galleries and art/music festivals throughout California. He also performed the drumbrella with the William Earth Harp Ensemble on the 2012 season of America's Got Talent where they came in 3rd.

== Filmography ==
Film
Year	Title	Role	Notes
1996	Cheap Curry and Calculus	Randal	Short film
1998	The Artists	Con Artist	Short film
1998	The Next Tenant		
2000	The Unscarred	Young Mickey	
2000	Damaged Goods	Randy	Film
2002	5 Card Stud		Film
2003	Other Side of the Road		
2004	Land of Plenty	Coroner's Assistant	Film
2005	The Chumscrubber	Aide to Mayor Ebbs	Film
2005	Death By Engagement	Robert 'Bobo' Slarn	Film
2005	Don't Come Knocking	2nd A.D.	Film
2007	Callback	Tony	Film
2008	Dark Reel	Derek Deeds	Film
2009	Body Politic	Vince	Film
2013	Sweet Talk	Samson	Film
2013	Crosshairs	Abe Frohman	Film
2013	The Face of Love	Nicholas	Film
2014	Under the Hollywood Sign	Tate	Film
2014	BFFs	Nicholas	Film
2015	Welcome to the Family	Stephen	Film
2016	The Love Witch	Wayne	Film
2017	Justice League Dark	Rath, Policeman (voice)	Direct-to-video
2018	The Outer Wild	Hank	
2019	Mama Bear	Prisoner	Short film

Television
Year	Title	Role	Notes
1994	Sisters	Dwayne	One episode
1998-1999	Cupid	Nick	10 episodes
1999	Turks	Randy	One episode
1999	Millennium	Lucas Wayne Barr	Two episodes
2000	CSI: Crime Scene Investigation	Ethan	One episode
2000	Walker, Texas Ranger	Lonny Redman	One episode
2001	NYPD Blue	Chris Padgett	One episode
2003	The District	Reese Philips	Three episodes Nominated *best actor* Women's Image Network awards
2004	Monk	Dustin Sheers	One episode
2004	Judging Amy	Buck Costello	Two episodes
2005	Veronica Mars	Dylan Goran	One episode
2007	Jericho	Kyle	Two episodes
2007-2008	Days of Our Lives	Detective Sullivan/ Det. Dom Ohanion	10 episodes
2009	Party Down	Coke Guy	One episode
2010	Burn Notice	Damon	One episode
2005-2010	CSI: NY	Gordon Sprouse/ Bobby Lugano	Two episodes
2011	Castle	Tom Moretti	One episode
2013	General Hospital	Carlos Rivera	Recurring role; 2013–16
2013	General Hospital	Joe Rivera	Recurring role; 2016
2015	iZombie	Artie Fiss	Episode: "Brother, Can You Spare a Brain?"
2015	Mad Men	Vince	1 episode
2017	The Detour	Carlos Camacho	6 episodes
2017	Small Shots	Clyde	2 episodes
2017–2018	Supernatural	Asmodeus	Recurring role, 5 episodes (season 13)
2018	13 Reasons Why	Will Walker	2 episodes (season 2)
2019	Henry Danger	Rob Moss	1 episode
2019	A Lover Scorned	Stevens	Television film
2019	The Young and the Restless	Simon Black	Recurring role
2020	The Magicians	Oren	Episode: "Apocalypse? Now?!"
2023	Leverage: Redemption	Hank Hogan	Episode: "The Belly of the Beast Job"

Video games
Year	Title	Role
2011	L.A. Noire	Leroy Sobo
2014	The Evil Within	Ivan Diaz

== Awards and nominations ==
Year	Award	Category	Work	Result	Ref.
2017	Daytime Emmy Award	Outstanding Supporting Actor in a Drama Series	General Hospital	Nominated	
2020	Daytime Emmy Award	Outstanding Guest Performer in a Drama Series	The Young and the Restless	Nominated	
