= The Wretched (film) =

2020 film by the Pierce Brothers

- Theatrical release poster
- Directed by: The Pierce Brothers
- Written by: The Pierce Brothers
- Produced by: Chang Tseng; Ed Polgardy; Brett Pierce; Drew Pierce; Travis Cultreri
- Starring: John-Paul Howard; Piper Curda; Zarah Mahler; Kevin Bigley; Gabriela Quezada Bloomgarden; Richard Ellis; Blane Crockarell; Jamison Jones; Azie Tesfai
- Cinematography: Conor Murphy
- Edited by: Terry Yates
- Music by: Devin Burrows
- Production company: Little Runway
- Distributed by: IFC Midnight
- Release dates: July 19, 2019 (Fantasia); May 1, 2020 (United States)
- Running time: 96 minutes
- Country: United States
- Language: English
- Budget: $66,000 (est.)
- Box office: $4.4 million

The Wretched is a 2019 American supernatural horror film written and directed by the Pierce Brothers. It stars John-Paul Howard, Piper Curda, Zarah Mahler, Kevin Bigley, Gabriela Quezada Bloomgarden, Richard Ellis, Blane Crockarell, Jamison Jones, and Azie Tesfai. The film follows a defiant teenage boy who faces off with an evil witch posing as the neighbor next door.

The Wretched had its world premiere at the Fantasia International Film Festival on July 19, 2019, and was released in drive-in theaters and through Premium VOD on May 1, 2020. Due to the COVID-19 pandemic limiting the number of films in theaters, it became the first film since Avatar (2009) to top the box office for six consecutive weekends.

== Plot ==
In 1985, Megan arrives at the home of the Gambels to babysit their daughter Ashley. In the basement, she finds a creature feeding off little Ashley. Terrified, she tries to escape, but Mr. Gambel purposely shuts the door on her. Megan is presumed killed. A strange sign is shown on the door.

In the present, Ben Shaw comes to be with his father Liam as his parents are in the middle of a divorce. Ben lands a job working at the marina, where he befriends Mallory. He also notices Liam getting close with Sara, a co-worker. In the woods, Dillon, the son of Liam's neighbor Abbie, finds a tree with the same symbol seen at the Gambel house. He hears what sounds like Abbie's voice coming from the tree, calling to him before the real Abbie appears. They bring a buck home that they hit and that night, something crawls out of the buck's corpse.

Ben befriends Dillon. That night, Abbie goes to check on Sam in his crib. In his room, she hears a crunching sound and sees the window left open. In the crib she sees finds sticks wrapped inside a blanket and is then attacked. Ben later notices Abbie going into the forest with a child. At work, he learns that Dillon never showed up for sailing lessons. When he goes to Dillon's house, the father Ty denies having a son. Later, Abbie whispers something demonic in Ty's ear that makes him bleed. She then takes a shower and her body starts to decay.

Ben is suspicious and reads about a witch that is known for possessing people and taking children. He goes into Abbie's cellar and finds a picture of the family, along with a picture of Mallory and her sister Lily, making him realize that the witch is after Lily next. He rushes to save Lily, but is too late, as the witch has pulled her into her tree, leading to Mallory forgetting Lily. While Ben is with Sara, he notices flowers decaying, and realizes she is possessed by the witch. When she tries to attack, he slashes her arm, but the witch makes it look like he attacked Sara for no reason. He is taken into custody. The officer driving Ben to the station instead attempts to drown him at the beach until a dog attacks. The officer shoots the dog and then himself as he realizes that something is controlling him to kill Ben. Meanwhile, Liam finds the dead bodies of Ty and Abbie at their house. Sara sneaks up to stab Liam but Ben arrives and shoots her. The witch crawls out of Sara's corpse and goes after Ben, but he takes Liam to safety as their house burns down. Ben then remembers that he has a little brother, Nathan. All this time, the witch had made him forget about Nathan.

Ben and Mallory go to the tree to rescue their siblings. As Ben rescues Nathan and Lily, Liam arrives and rams his car into the witch. Later, Ben and Mallory kiss goodbye, and she puts a flower in his hair before leaving to give sailing lessons. Ben notices the flower is fake, revealing that the witch is alive and is now possessing Mallory, who is alone with three children.

== Cast ==
- John-Paul Howard as Ben Shaw
- Piper Curda as Mallory
- Jamison Jones as Liam Shaw
- Azie Tesfai as Sara
- Zarah Mahler as Abbie
- Kevin Bigley as Ty
- Gabriela Quezada Bloomgarden as JJ
- Richard Ellis as Gage
- Blane Crockarell as Dillon
- Judah Abner Paul as Nathan Shaw
- Ja'layah Washington as Lily
- Amy Waller as Nora
- Ross Kidder as Officer Guthrie
- Kasey Bell as Officer Kopitar
- Sydne Mikelle as Megan
- Tug Cocker as Mr. Gambel
- Madelynn Stuenkel as The Wretch
- Owen Thomas Pierce as Baby Sam
- Kenzie Jones as Ashley Gambel
- Ryan Alexander Holmes as Adam
- Pamela Gray as Counselor Rutland
- Ice as old fisherman's dog

== Production ==
Filming took place around Omena and Northport, Michigan, near the Pierces' hometown.

Composer, and childhood friend of the Pierce Brothers, Devin Burrows composed the film's score. According to Burrows in a 2020 Nightmare on Film Street interview, he visited the film's shooting locations prior to principal photography, to work the natural influence and inspiration into the music. The trio also worked together on the Pierce Brothers' 2011 film Deadheads.

== Release ==
The film premiered at the Fantasia International Film Festival on July 19, 2019. It also screened at the Traverse City Film Festival, and at the Toronto After Dark Film Festival. It was released in selected theaters (mainly drive-ins), and through Premium VOD in the United States on May 1, 2020. The film was released in cinemas in the Netherlands on June 25, 2020.

== Reception ==
=== Box office ===
The Wretched grossed $1.8 million in the United States and Canada, and $2.5 million in other territories, for a worldwide total of $4.3 million.

Due to limited theater exposure and few films playing due to the COVID-19 pandemic, The Wretched was #1 at the box office in its opening weekend, earning $65,908 from 12 theaters. The film finished first again the following weekend with $69,608 at 19 theaters, for a 10-day running total of $165,294. The film remained in first the following four weekends, making $91,975 from 21 drive-in theaters in its third, $215,836 from 59 in its fourth, and $181,000 from 75 in its fifth. It became the first film to top the box office five weekends in a row since Black Panther, which opened in February 2018, although it was noted that Trolls World Tour would have likely come in first over the course of its release had its weekly grosses been made public.

The film then made $207,212 from 99 theaters and crossed the $1 million mark, topping newcomer Becky by $1,415 to remain in first for the sixth straight weekend (the first film since Avatar in 2009 to do so). It was finally dethroned in its seventh weekend, finishing third, behind Becky and Infamous with $148,583.

=== Critical response ===
On Rotten Tomatoes, the film holds an approval rating of 75% based on 110 reviews, with an average rating of 6.2/10. The website's critics consensus reads, "The Wretched stirs up a savory blend of witch-in-the-woods horror ingredients that should leave genre fans hungry for a second helping from writer-directors Brett and Drew T. Pierce." On Metacritic, the film has a weighted average score of 61 out of 100 based on 15 critic reviews, indicating "generally favorable reviews".

Jeannette Catsoulis of The New York Times gave the film a largely positive review, writing, "Blessed with shivery setups and freaky effects—here, skin-crawling is literal—The Wretched transforms common familial anxieties into flesh, albeit crepey and creeping." Geoff Berkshire of the Los Angeles Times wrote, "What the Pierce brothers lack in flavorful storytelling or compelling characters, they almost entirely make up for in good old-fashioned atmosphere and suspense. The Wretched rarely surprises, but it's well-crafted enough to get under your skin anyway, with an able assist from the creepy camerawork of cinematographer Conor Murphy and unsettling score by Devin Burrows."

Writing for RogerEbert.com, Simon Abrams gave the film 1.5 out of 4 stars, saying that "unlike Stranger Things, The Wretched is a little too cute about teen angst, and not light enough on its feet to make you want to root for its ostensibly typical adolescent."

== Sequel ==
On January 28 2025, The Pierce Brothers announced that Brett and Drew Pierce and Little Runway Productions will begin production on The Wretched 2 in September in Oregon, with casting underway and The Pierce Brothers will return as writer and director of the upcoming sequel. Katie Parker and Sam Huntington are set to star.
