= Don't Smoke Dope, Fry Your Hair! =

Live album by Franklyn Ajaye
- Released: 1976
- Venue: Roxy Theatre
- Genre: Comedy
- Label: Little David

Franklyn Ajaye chronology
I'm a Comedian, Seriously (1974)	Don't Smoke Dope, Fry Your Hair! (1976)	Plaid Pants and Psychopaths (1986)

Don't Smoke Dope, Fry Your Hair! is an album by the American comedian Franklyn Ajaye, released in 1976. He supported it with North American tours with Kenny Rankin and then Vicki Sue Robinson. The album is included in the book Horrifically Bad Album Covers.

== Production ==
Ajaye honed his material at the Comedy Store; he admired the looseness of Richard Pryor and George Carlin. The album was recorded at the Roxy Theatre, with Carlin in the audience. It came with a warning that advised disc jockeys to listen to the album before playing it on the air, as some audiences may find it offensive. The title track is a riff about James Brown. "Disneyland High" imagines Mickey Mouse making park announcements in African-American Vernacular English. "Be Black Brother, Be Black" is in part a bit on Matthew Henson becoming the first person to set foot on the North Pole. "The Walrus of Love" pokes fun at Barry White. Ajaye had wanted to call the album Manic Depressive on the Rise, before his manager interceded.

== Critical reception ==
Professional ratings
Review scores
Source	Rating
The New Rolling Stone Record Guide	1/5 stars

The San Francisco Chronicle noted that "unlike the street jive of Richard Pryor, Ajaye is tuned in to a more bourgeois image, drawing his humor from ... middle-class sources". The Ann Arbor News called Ajaye's routines "bright, cutting, and right on the money." The Green Bay Press-Gazette said that Ajaye "makes observations that cut to the quick of the truth." The Commercial Appeal considered the album to be better than Pryor's Bicentennial Nigger.

The Daily Illini stated that "several spontaneous one-liners provide relief from otherwise dull routines." The Star Tribune labeled Ajaye "the funniest unknown in the business today". The Belleville Times News listed the album as the best comedy release of 1976. The New Rolling Stone Record Guide panned the "stale material".

== Track listing ==
Side one

1. "Puberty"
2. "College"
3. "Be Black Brother, Be Black"
4. "Cruising to an F"
5. "Oriental Smarts"
6. "Cartoons"

Side two

1. "Don't Smoke Dope, Fry Your Hair!"
2. "The Walrus of Love"
3. "Babies with Big Heads"
4. "Me and Trey"
5. "Disneyland High"
