= He Was a Quiet Man =

- Film poster
- Directed by: Frank Cappello
- Written by: Frank Cappello
- Produced by: Mike Leahy; Frank Cappello; Jason Hallock
- Starring: Christian Slater; Elisha Cuthbert; Sascha Knopf; John Gulager; Jamison Jones; William H. Macy
- Cinematography: Brandon Trost
- Edited by: Kirk M. Morri
- Music by: Jeff Beal
- Distributed by: Anchor Bay Entertainment
- Release date: 2007
- Running time: 95 minutes
- Country: United States
- Language: English
- Box office: $83,440

He Was a Quiet Man is a 2007 American black comedy drama film, written and directed by Frank Cappello. The film stars Christian Slater, Elisha Cuthbert, Jamison Jones, and William H. Macy.

== Plot ==
Bob Maconel is an insignificant office worker who fantasizes about murdering his coworkers. On one particularly bad day, Bob is about to go on a murderous rampage when his coworker, Ralf Coleman, beats him to it, shooting up the office and killing several people. Bob shoots Coleman dead with the gun he planned to use on the others. He finds Venessa, a pretty executive he has never had the courage to talk to, wounded on the floor, and saves her life. The former invisible nobody is suddenly thrown into the spotlight of public notice, and he is considered a hero by those he wished to murder. His boss, Gene Shelby, promotes Bob to "VP of Creative Thinking" and gives him all the perks of higher management. Meanwhile, he visits Venessa, who is now a quadriplegic; at first she curses him for not letting her die, and then she asks him to put her out of her misery.

Venessa asks Bob to let her roll down a subway platform in front of an oncoming train. Bob debates whether or not to go through with it, scrawling "should I finish what Coleman started?", on a piece of paper, which he accidentally gives to another employee with other papers to be copied. Bob initially agrees, and takes Venessa out for one last night on the town, before letting her end her life. At the crucial moment, however, he cannot bring himself to let go of her chair, as he has fallen in love with her. They then discover that she can wiggle her little finger, providing hope that she may recover, and they become romantically involved. Bob is still trapped by the demons of his past, however, and fears that as soon as Venessa recovers, she will leave him. He becomes especially insecure when he finds out that Venessa and Shelby were once lovers.

The company psychiatrist, Maurice Gregory, reveals that he knows Bob wrote the note about Coleman, and that Bob was only promoted so management could keep an eye on him. Bob flies into a rage, gets into a fight with two coworkers, and storms out. He returns home to find Shelby visiting Venessa with gifts, further igniting Bob's jealousy. Once Shelby leaves, Bob demands to know what the two of them were doing; Venessa replies that Shelby has become concerned about Bob's behavior and stopped by to check on him. However, Bob opens Shelby's gift and finds photos of Shelby and Venessa together. Bob has a mental breakdown and goes back to the office, taking his gun with him.

Finally, it is revealed that Bob has been hallucinating all of the events since just before the initial shooting and Coleman is a figment of his imagination (the last name "Coleman" is an anagram for "Maconel"). This time, he is in the same position as Coleman was, only instead of killing his coworkers, he shoots himself in front of Venessa. The last scenes show police searching his house to find a note that reads, "You may ask why I did what I did... but what choice did you give me? How else could I have gotten your attention?" In the news, reporters interview his neighbors, who say, "He was a quiet man."

== Cast ==
- Christian Slater as Bob Maconel
- Elisha Cuthbert as Venessa Parks
- William H. Macy as Gene Shelby
- Sascha Knopf as Paula Metzler
- David Wells as Ralf Coleman
- Jamison Jones as Scott Harper
- Michael DeLuise as Detective Sorenson
- Anzu Lawson as Nancy Felt
- John Gulager as Goldie / Maurice Gregory
- Frankie Lou Thorn as Jessica Light
- Randolph Mantooth as Dr. Willis
- Greg Baker as Copy Boy
- Sewell Whitney as Derrick Miles

== Awards ==
- May 1, 2007. Best Cinematography at the Newport Film Festival
- June 11, 2007. Best Director at the Jackson Hole Film Festival
- June 5, 2007. Best Feature at Seattle's True Independent Film Festival
- October 9, 2009. Best Actor at Goa True Film Festival

== Reception ==
Rotten Tomatoes gives the film an approval rating of 79%, based on 19 reviews.

== Home media ==
The DVD version contains two alternate endings of the story.

In a first alternate ending, the lead-up to the shooting reveals that Bob is indeed the shooter and intends to shoot Venessa (due to his frustration that she does not know he exists), but before he can fire a shot, Bob is himself shot several times in the chest. The scene reveals Coleman to be the hero in this ending, having shot Bob through the cubicle wall. As Bob lies on the floor and his vision fades to black, he sees coworkers standing over him, with Venessa being the last coworker, mouthing the words "I love you" before he dies.

In a second alternate ending, all events of the first alternate ending come to pass. As Bob's vision fades to black and he sees Venessa mouth the words "I love you," a faint beeping sound is heard. The scene then flashes to Bob, sitting in his cubicle, going through a normal day with the shooting having never taken place. Venessa walks by his cubicle and comments on the hula-dancing figurine on Bob's desk. Bob removes a notebook from his desk drawer, and notes that today, Venessa loved his hula girl. The image pans out to reveal a meticulously detailed log of all inconsequential events and interactions with Venessa over the course of months (or even years). The book then closes to the end credits.

In "the emotionally right ending" of the 2020 director's recut, Venessa is shown in the same romantic scenes with Bob, but not paralyzed. It is revealed that Bob had confused himself with Coleman and that Coleman shot Bob when Bob pulled out a gun without shooting. As Bob dies, Venessa mouths "I love you". In a post-credits scene, Bob fires a shot in an empty office.
