= Ryo Ishibashi =

Japanese actor (born 1956)

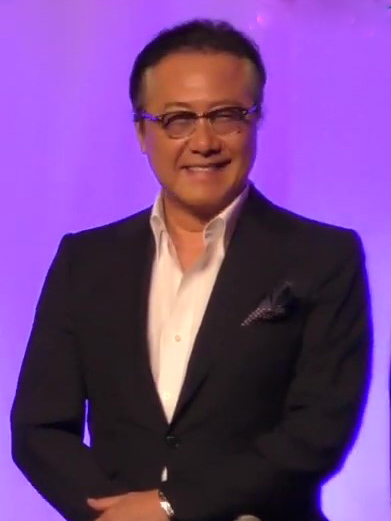
- Ryo Ishibashi
- Born: Hideki Ishibashi; July 20, 1956 (age 70); Kurume, Fukuoka, Japan
- Occupations: Actor, singer
- Years active: 1978–present
- Spouse: Mieko Harada (m. 1987)
- Children: 3, including Shizuka Ishibashi
- Musical career
- Genres: Rock
- Label: Invitation
- Member of: ARB

Japanese name
- Kanji: 石橋 凌
- Hiragana: いしばし りょう

Alternative Japanese name
- Kanji: 石橋 秀樹
- Hiragana: いしばし ひでき

Ryo Ishibashi (石橋 凌, Ishibashi Ryō; born Hideki Ishibashi; July 20, 1956) is a Japanese actor and singer. He is known internationally for his starring roles in the horror films Audition (1999), Suicide Club (2001), The Grudge (2004) and its sequel The Grudge 2 (2006). He is also the lead singer of the Japanese rock band ARB.

== Life and career ==
Ishibashi was born in Kurume, Fukuoka Prefecture, Japan. He started his own band called the ARB (Alexander Ragtime Band) in 1977. The band made their debut in 1978, and made over a dozen albums until they broke up in 1990. Ishibashi has subsequently resumed his musical activity and re-formed ARB with an album, Real Life in 1998.

In 1986, Ishibashi made his movie debut in the film A Homansu, directed by Yusaku Matsuda, in which ARB's 13th single "After 45" was used as its theme song. Ryo Ishibashi has been concentrating on his acting career, and has appeared in several movies outside his native country.

He won the award for Best Actor at the 11th Yokohama Film Festival for A Sign Days and at the 5th Japan Film Professional Awards he took the Best Actor award for his role as a yakuza hitman in Another Lonely Hitman.

Ishibashi has been married to Mieko Harada since 1987 and has three children, including actress Shizuka Ishibashi

== Filmography ==
=== Films ===
- A Homansu (1986)
- Leave My Girl Alone (1986)
- A Sign Days (1989)
- American Yakuza (1993)
- Blue Tiger (1994)
- Natural Woman (1994)
- Another Lonely Hitman (1995)
- Back to Back (1996)
- Kids Return (1996)
- Audition (1999)
- Brother (2000)
- Suicide Club (2002)
- Moon Child (2003)
- The Grudge (2004)
- The Grudge 2 (2006)
- Shamo (2007)
- War (2007), Shiro Yanagawa
- Ace Attorney (2012), Karuma Gō / Manfred von Karma
- Persona Non Grata (2015), Chūichi Ōhashi
- Masquerade Hotel (2019), Fujiki
- Dancing Mary (2020)
- The Cinderella Addiction (2021), Masaaki Fukuura
- Masquerade Night (2021), Fujiki
- Parasite in Love (2021), Urizane
- Yukiko a.k.a (2025), Kazuhiko Yoshimura

=== Television ===
- Takeda Shingen (1988), Oda Nobunaga
- Nemureru Mori (1998), Detective Onda
- Ryōmaden (2010), Asahina Masahiro
- Man of Destiny (2012), Takashi Anzai
- Mikaiketsu Jiken: File. 05 (2016), Kakuei Tanaka
- Smoking (2018), Uncle Sabe
- The Naked Director (2019), Ikezawa
- Awaiting Kirin (2020), Takeda Shingen
- Modern Love Tokyo (2022), Kōsuke Hayami
- Grass for My Pillow (2026), Tatsugoro Horikawa

=== Video games ===
- Yakuza Kiwami 3 & Dark Ties (2026) - Shigeru Nakahara
