= Jamison Jones =

American actor (born 1969)

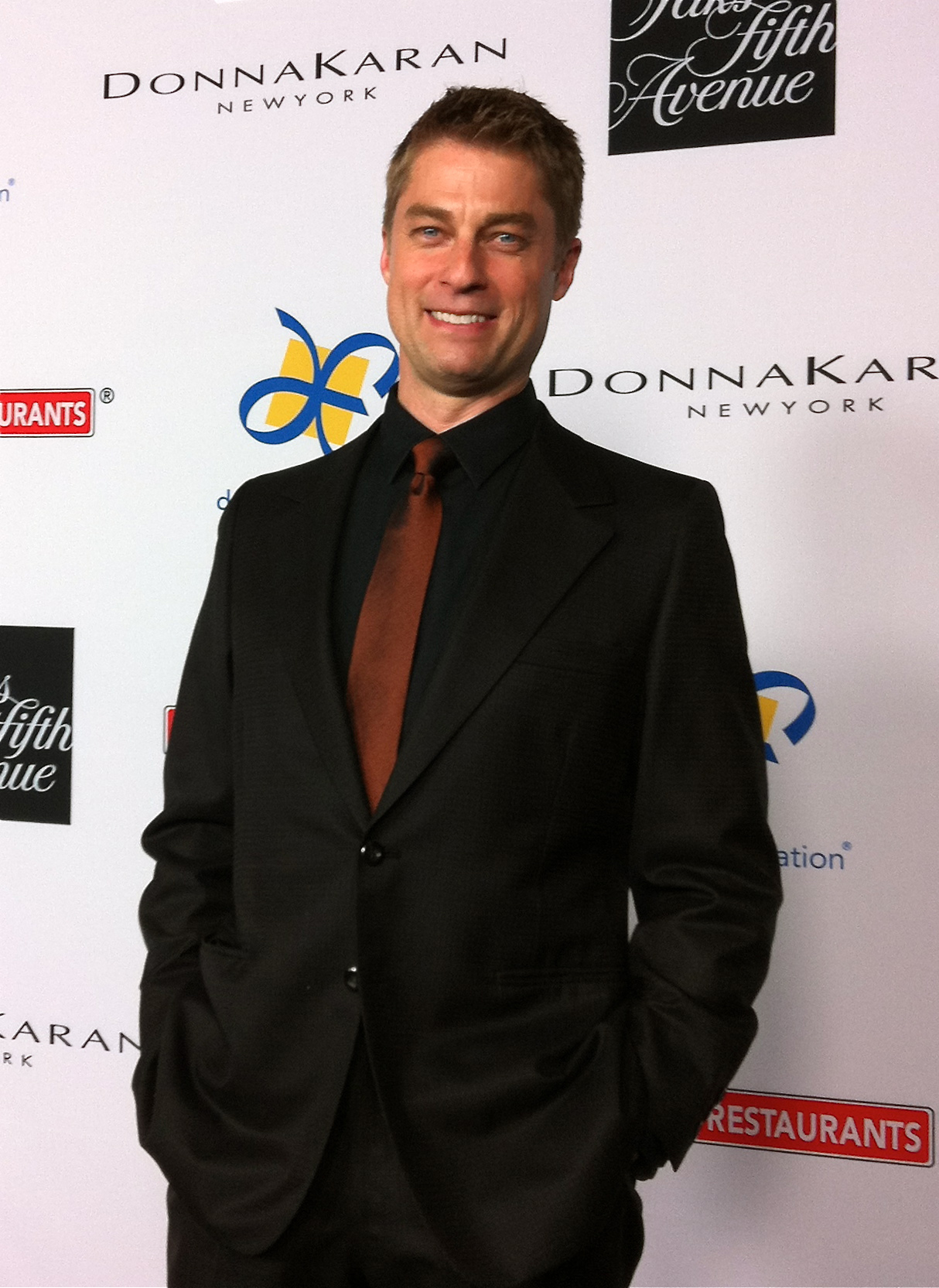
- Jones in November 2011
- Born: February 15, 1969 (age 57); Rochester, Michigan, U.S.
- Occupation: Actor
- Years active: 1990–present

Jamison Jones (born February 15, 1969) is an American actor, known for his leading roles in the films He Was a Quiet Man and The Wretched, and as a regular cast member on General Hospital, and in the Fox series 24. He originated the title role in the world premiere of Roberto Aguirre-Sacasa’s Doctor Cerberus at the Tony Award-winning South Coast Repertory. Jones has also guest-starred on several television series, including Burn Notice, Will & Grace, CSI: NY, NCIS, True Detective, and The Whispers.

== Early life ==
Born in Rochester, Michigan, Jones spent several years living abroad. He attended Frankfurt International School in Germany before returning to Michigan for his high school years where he began taking up acting. He graduated from Rochester Adams High School in 1987. After being accepted with a scholarship to the WMU Theater department, Jones spent 2 years at Western Michigan University before moving to Los Angeles where he studied theatre in University of California, Los Angeles. He finished his Bachelor's degree at California State University, Fullerton.

== Career ==
Jones began his professional career on stage in the European Premieres of Purple Hearts and Tennessee in the Summer at the Edinburgh Festival in Scotland. Jones is a graduate of the MFA Advanced Training Program at the American Conservatory Theater. After graduation, Jones became a member of ACT’s professional acting company and worked on the critically acclaimed Angels in America directed by Mark Wing-Davey also starring Ben Shenkman, Rosencrantz and Guildenstern are Dead and Othello. Jones returned to ACT in 2012 to perform in the west coast premiere of Jordan Harrison's Maple and Vine and played the titular role in Ensemble Theater's visually compelling cutting edge production of Macbeth.

Jones' first film roles were in Lucasfilm's Radioland Murders (1994) and in the LucasArts video game Star Wars: Rebel Assault II (1995). In 1996, Jones moved to Los Angeles to continue his career in film and television. Film credits include The Lodger with Alfred Molina; Born to Ride (2010) with William Forsythe; He Was a Quiet Man (2007) with Christian Slater and William H. Macy; Dark Blue (2002) with Kurt Russell; Hollywood Homicide (2003) with Harrison Ford. He has both an actor and producer credits for West of Brooklyn (2008) with Joe Mantegna. Jones taught acting at the American Musical and Dramatic Academy but continues to teach privately in Hollywood at Television Center Studios.

Jones has also served as Theater Director, Screenwriter and Producer and is a part-owner of a bi-coastal film development company named Jones Films Entertainment. Jones Films is developing several feature films and television projects, including Agoura Hills, the story of an agoraphobic weatherman who is afraid to go outside; and Malibu Gothic, which follows the life of an aging international movie star who falls into the unenviable position of protecting Malibu's secret society from the rest of the world.

== Filmography ==
=== Film ===
| Year | Title | Role | Notes |
|---|---|---|---|
| 1994 | Radioland Murders | Pilot | |
| 1995 | Star Wars: Rebel Assault II: The Hidden Empire | Rookie One | Video Game |
| 1995 | Mail Bonding | Ex-boyfriend | Short film |
| 1996 | Top Gun: Fire At Will | Stinger | Video Game |
| 2002 | Dark Blue | Frank | |
| 2003 | Le défi | Debussy | |
| 2003 | Water Under the Bridge | Alan | |
| 2003 | Hollywood Homicide | Det. Bobby Riley | |
| 2005 | Gettin' Lucky | Guru | |
| 2005 | Street 16 | Flynn | |
| 2005 | Soldier of God | Featured fighter | |
| 2006 | Protected! | Fred Wiggum | |
| 2007 | He Was a Quiet Man | Scott Harper | |
| 2007 | A-Date | Owen | |
| 2008 | West of Brooklyn | California Guy | |
| 2009 | 2:13 | John's father | |
| 2009 | The Lodger | LAPD Officer #2 | |
| 2010 | Born to Ride | Gary | Vista Films |
| 2013 | Collusions | Sean | |
| 2019 | The Wretched | Liam | |
| 2019 | Steele Wool | The Boss | |

=== Television ===
| Year | Title | Role | Notes |
|---|---|---|---|
| 2000 | JAG | Edward Proxy | Episode: "People v. Gunny" |
| 2004–05 | General Hospital | William Peavy | 25 Episodes |
| 2007 | CSI: NY | Austin Cannon | |
| 2007 | 24 | Secret Service Agent Dan | |
| 2009 | Terminator: The Sarah Connor Chronicles | Harrison | |
| 2009 | Kamen Rider Dragon Knight | Agent Phillips | |
| 2010 | Burn Notice | Charles Archer | Season 4 |
| 2010 | Days of Our Lives | Kip | |
| 2010 | Brothers & Sisters | Henry's Dad | |
| 2012 | Undercover Bridesmaid | Kevin | |
| 2012 | Puppy Love | Ryles | |
| 2014 | Longmire | Graham VanBlarcom | |
| 2015 | The Whispers | Harrison Weil | Recurring role |
| 2015 | True Detective | Will Davidson | Recurring role |
| 2016 | General Hospital | Brady Bevin | |
| 2017 | Rosewood | Dale Bartram | |
| 2017 | In An Instant | Victor Barnard | |
| 2020 | General Hospital | Warren Kirk | |
| 2021 | The Young and the Restless | Jesse Gaines | Recurring role |
| 2022 | The Afterparty | Bishop Marshall | |
| 2022 | 9-1-1 | Oren | Episode: Fear-o-Phobia |

=== Theater ===
| Title | Director | Theater |
|---|---|---|
| American Son | Jonathan Fox | English Theater Frankfurt |
| American Son | Jonathan Fox | Ensemble Theater Company |
| Arsenic and Old Lace | Casey Stangl | La Mirada Theatre |
| The Christians | Taibi Magar | Chautauqua Theater Company |
| Macbeth | Jonathan Fox | Ensemble Theater, Santa Barbara |
| Maple and Vine | Mark Rucker | American Conservatory Theater |
| Angels in America | Richard Seyd | American Conservatory Theater |
| Rosencrantz and Guildenstern are Dead | Richard Seyd | American Conservatory Theater |
| Doctor Cerberus (World Premiere) | Bart DeLorenzo | South Coast Repertory |
| Elemeno Pea | Marc Masterson | South Coast Repertory |
| The Three Musketeers | Art Manke | Denver Center for the Performing Arts |
| How the Other Half Loves | Larry Arrick | Pasadena Playhouse |
| Cyrano de Bergerac | Art Manke | A Noise Within |
| God of Carnage | Michael Arabian | La Mirada Theatre |
| The Rainmaker | Jules Aaron | La Mirada Theatre |
| Dancing at Lughnasa | Jessica Kubzansky | La Mirada Theatre |
| All My Sons | Jules Aaron | La Mirada Theatre |
| The Foreigner | Jules Aaron | La Mirada Theatre |
| Lion in Winter | Richard Seyd | La Mirada Theatre |
| Thérèse Raquin | Jonathan Fox | Ensemble Theater, Santa Barbara |
| Tennessee in the Summer | Doyne Mraz | Edinburgh Festival |
| Purple Hearts | Doyne Mraz | Edinburgh Festival |
