= Franklyn Ajaye =

American comedian and actor

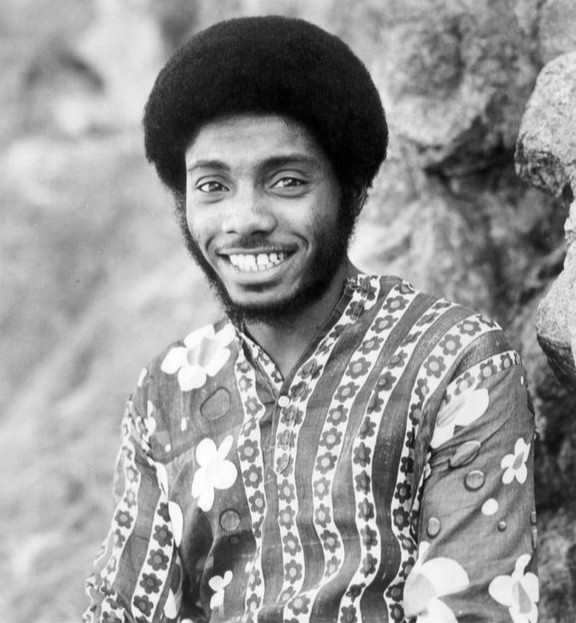
- Ajaye in 1975
- Born: May 13, 1949 (age 77); New York City, New York, U.S.
- Occupations: Actor, comedian
- Years active: 1973–present

Franklyn Ajaye (born May 13, 1949) is an American stand-up comedian, actor, and writer. He released a series of comedy albums starting in 1973 and has acted in film and television shows from the 1970s through the present, including as a primary character in the 1976 ensemble comedy Car Wash and a supporting role in Sam Peckinpah's Convoy (1978).

== Life and career ==
Franklyn Ajaye Jr. was born in Brooklyn, New York, but raised in Los Angeles by a Sierra Leonean father (Franklin Ajaye Sr.) and an American mother (Quetta Curtis). This makes Ajaye, as he likes to joke, a "true African-American". He has a brother. Ajaye attended Dorsey High School in Crenshaw.

He has released five comedy albums to date: Franklyn Ajaye, Comedian (1973), I'm a Comedian, Seriously (1974), Don't Smoke Dope, Fry Your Hair! (1976), Plaid Pants and Psychopaths (1986), and Vagabond Jazz & the Abstract Truth (2004). The last two were recorded in Sydney and Melbourne, Australia.

He made his network debut on The Flip Wilson Show in 1973 and made his first appearance on The Tonight Show Starring Johnny Carson a year later. Ajaye emigrated to Melbourne, Australia, in 1997 but returns to the United States periodically to do work on television. His last American television appearance was on Paul Provenza's The Greenroom on Showtime in 2011. He is known in Australia for his appearances on The Panel and Thank God You're Here and for his popular one-man shows "Nothing But The Truth", "Talkin' Vagabond Jazz", and "Vagabond Jazz & The Abstract Truth" at the Melbourne International Comedy Festival.

He has worked as an actor, appearing in films such as Sweet Revenge (1976), Car Wash (1976), Convoy (1978), Stir Crazy (1980), the 1980 version of The Jazz Singer, Hysterical (1982), Get Crazy (1983), Fraternity Vacation (1985), Hollywood Shuffle (1987), The Wrong Guys (1988), The 'Burbs (1989), and American Yakuza (1993). He also appeared on an episode of Barney Miller as police-car thief Wendell Frasier in 1976. He has been seen more recently in the TV show Deadwood as Samuel Fields and reprised that role in 2019's Deadwood: The Movie. In 2011, Ajaye had a small but memorable role in the box office hit Bridesmaids, playing the father of Lillian (played by Maya Rudolph), and in 2013 he played management guru Marvin Hudsfield in the Australian Broadcasting Corporation sitcom Utopia. He has been nominated twice for Emmy Awards for Outstanding Writing in a Variety or Music Program: In 1990 for In Living Color; and again in 1997 for Politically Incorrect. He worked on the hit family comedy series created and executive-produced by Robert Townsend, The Parent 'Hood (January 1995 – July 1999); some of his credits on the show include acting as "executive consultant" with Barry "Berry" Douglas in season 1 episode 9 ("Trial by Jerri") and episode 11 ("Nice Guys Finish Last") and as a co-producer with Douglas for season 2 episode 2 ("A Kiss is Just a Kiss").

Ajaye is the author of Comic Insights: The Art of Standup Comedy (ISBN 978-1-879505-54-4), which contains interviews with Jerry Seinfeld, Chris Rock, Bill Maher, Ellen DeGeneres, and other famous stand-up comedians offering valuable advice for aspiring comedians.

== Influence ==
On his stand-up television show Stewart Lee's Comedy Vehicle the British comedian used Ajaye's LP I'm a Comedian, Seriously as the basis of a routine.

== Filmography ==
=== Film ===
Year	Title	Role	Notes
1976	Sweet Revenge	Edmund	
1976	Car Wash	The Fly	
1978	Convoy	Spider Mike	
1980	Stir Crazy	Young Man in Hospital	
1980	The Jazz Singer	Bubba	
1980	Hysterical	Leroy	
1983	Get Crazy	Cool	
1985	Fraternity Vacation	Harry	
1987	Hollywood Shuffle	Body Guard #1	
1988	The Wrong Guys	Franklyn	
1989	The 'Burbs	Detective	
1993	American Yakuza	Sam	
2001	Brown Shoe Polish	Viennese Cake Shop Owner	Short film
2002	Queen of the Damned	French Dealer	
2011	Bridesmaids	Lillian's Dad	
2015	Too Hip for the Room	Joe Papy	

=== Television ===
Year	Title	Role	Notes
1975	Barney Miller	Wendell Frazier	Episode: "You Dirty Rat"
1977	Saturday Night Live	Himself	Host: Ray Charles
1978	The Bionic Woman	Benny	Episode: "All for One"
1978	Chico and the Man	Tony Rogers	Episode: "Della and Son"
1980	The Cheap Detective	Elvis	TV movie
1983	The New Odd Couple	Henry	Episode: "The Night Stalker"
1984	Hot Flashes	Walter Conkrite	5 episodes
1987	Glory Years	Wilson	TV movie
1989	227	Painter	Episode: "Tenants, Anyone?"
1992	The New WKRP in Cincinnati	Reggie	Episode: "Spies Like Us"
1992	Disney's Goof Troop	(voice)	Episode: "Cabana Fever"; credited as Frankin Ajaye
1997	Happily Ever After: Fairy Tales for Every Child	Sporty the Cat (voice)	Episode: "Pinocchio"
1997	Frontline	Franklyn Ajaye	Episode: "The Code"
2003	Pirate Islands	Five Spice	26 episodes
2005–2006	Deadwood	Samuel Fields	11 episodes
2014	Utopia	Marvin Hudfield	Episode: "Then We Can Build It"
2019	Deadwood: The Movie	Samuel Fields	TV movie
