= Khrystyne Haje =

American actress

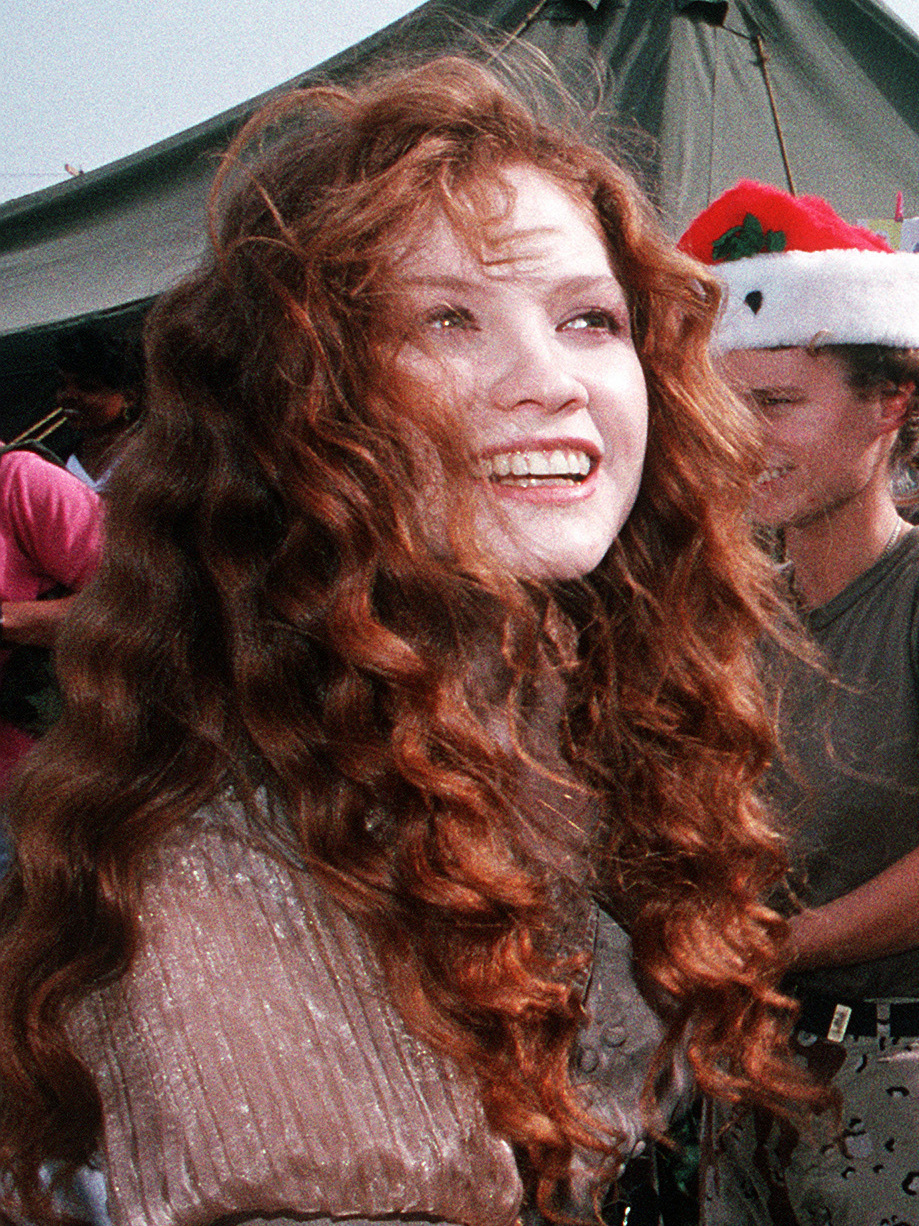
- Haje in 1990
- Born: Khrystyne Kamil Haje; December 21, 1968 (age 57); Santa Clara, California, U.S.
- Occupation: Actress
- Years active: 1985–2009, 2021–present

Khrystyne Kamil Haje (/krɪˈstiːn ˈhɒʒ/ krist-EEN HOZH; born December 21, 1968) is an American actress and businessperson. She is known for her role as Simone Foster in the sitcom series Head of the Class. After the series ended in 1991, she continued acting in both television and films. Haje was named as one of the "50 Most Beautiful People" in People magazine's first edition of that list in 1990.

== Career ==
Haje began her career at age 14 as a fashion model while attending North Hollywood High School. Her acting career started at 17 in the television film Crime of Innocence.

After appearing in several other television roles, including an appearance in the movie Bates Motel, Haje landed the role of sensitive poet Simone Foster on Head of the Class. After the series ended in 1991, she continued acting in both television and films. She was named as one of the "50 Most Beautiful People" in People magazine's first edition of that list in 1990.

That same year, Haje won a Daytime Emmy Award for Outstanding Special Class Program for hosting the special Spaceship Earth: Our Global Environment. In 1995, Haje guest-starred as Rebecca Fallbrook in the Batman: The Animated Series episode "The Terrible Trio".

In the late 1990s, she began working in theatre productions and appearing less in television productions.

In 2001, People magazine reported that Haje was "quarter owner of a Silicon Valley company" worth $500 million. Haje explained, "I was really lucky and made a smart move."

== Personal life ==
Haje was born in Santa Clara, California, and has four brothers. Her parents are of Lebanese and Czech origin. Haje is a founding board member of the Earth Communication Office (ECO), which helps to protect ecosystems.

She appeared on the March 23, 2012, episode of the Rachael Ray Show to have her hair cut as part of National Donate Your Hair Day (April 27) for women with cancer. That same year, she herself was treated for invasive lobular breast cancer; doctors estimated she had only two years to live. However, a medical trial called the SM-88 treatment (consisting of daily pills and injections) was successful, leaving her with no evidence of cancer within two years. She said, "I'm so lucky....I found this treatment, and I responded to it. And I don't suffer."

== Filmography ==
=== Film ===
Year	Title	Role	Notes
1994	Cyborg 3: The Recycler	Casella Reese	
1995	Scanners: The Showdown	Carrie Goodart	
1997	Morella	Inspector Farrow	
1997	Demolition University	Diane Woods	
2000	The King's Guard	Roxanne	
2000	Shriek If You Know What I Did Last Friday the 13th	Sexy Doctor	
2002	Man of the Year	Vanessa	
2002	Redemption	Nancy	Direct-to-video
2002	5 Card Stud	Aly	
2003	Easy as Pie	Nellie May	Short film
2023	The Road Dog	Laura	

=== Television ===
Year	Title	Role	Notes
1986	ABC Afterschool Special	Alix Shuman	Episode: "Can a Guy Say No?"
1986–87	CBS Schoolbreak Special	Brianne Corey, Michelle Rouke	2 episodes
1987	Bates Motel	Sally	Television film
1989	The Gifted One	Mary Joe	Television film
1990	Growing Pains	Teenage Chrissy Seaver	Episode: "Future Shock"
1986–91	Head of the Class	Simone Foster	114 episodes
1992	Hearts Are Wild	Allison Barnes	Episode: "Pilot"
1992	The Young Riders	Margaret	Episode: "Spies"
1992	Zorro	Annie Smith	Episode: "They Call Her Annie"
1993	Raven	Sharon Sanders	Episode: "Disciples of Dawn"
1993	Parker Lewis Can't Lose	Nicole	Episode: "Educating Brad"
1994	Attack of the 5 Ft. 2 In. Women	Nancy Cardigan	Television film (segment: "Tonya: The Battle of Wounded Knee")
1994	Diagnosis: Murder	Jennifer Sweeney	Episode: "A Very Fatal Funeral"
1995	Prince for a Day	Nora Flynn	Television film
1995	Campus Cops	La Becka Montaigne	Episode: "StinkyHiggins"
1995	Haunted Lives: True Ghost Stories	Pearl Bryan	Episode: "The Headless Ghost"
1995	Murder, She Wrote	Andrea Beaumont	Episode: "Murder in High C"
1995	A Perry Mason Mystery: The Case of the Jealous Jokester	Patricia McDonald	Television film
1995	Platypus Man	Monica	Episode: "Out of the Mouths of Babes"
1995	Batman: The Animated Series	Rebecca Falbrook (voice)	Episode: "The Terrible Trio"
1996	Nick Freno: Licensed Teacher	Heather Kellogg	Episode: "Hot for Teacher"
1998	Adventures from the Book of Virtues	Inothea (voice)	Episode: "Determination"
2000	Stepsister from Planet Weird	Kathy Larson	Television film
2001	The Zeta Project	Tiffany Morgan (voice)	Episode: "Hicksburg"
2002	Law & Order: Special Victims Unit	Francesca Jesner	Episode: "Counterfeit"
2002–03	Law & Order	Rebecca, Elaine Blanchard	2 episodes
2009	God Loves ME Best!	Jade	Television film

== Awards and nominations ==
1992: Daytime Emmy Award for Outstanding Special Class Program; Spaceship Earth: Our Global Environment (shared with Kirk Bergstrom and Kit Thomas)

Young Artist Awards nominations:

- 1987: Exceptional Performance By a Young Actress in a New Television, Comedy or Drama Series, Head of the Class
- 1988: Exceptional Performance by a Young Actress in a Television Comedy Series, Head of the Class
- 1989: Best Young Actress – Starring in a Television Comedy Series, Head of the Class
