= François Chau =

Cambodian actor (born 1959)

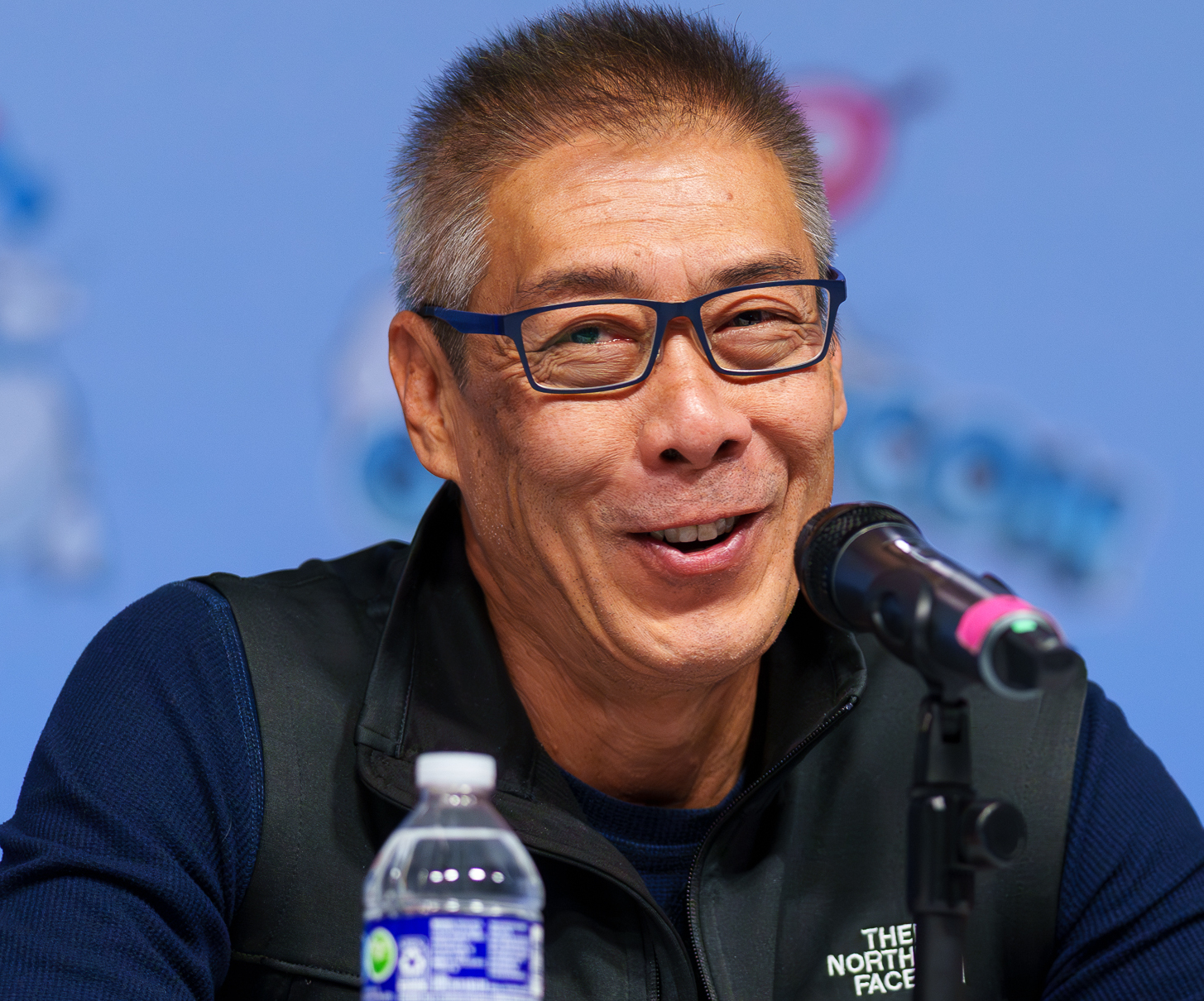
- François Chau in 2025
- Born: October 26, 1959 (age 67); Phnom Penh, Cambodia
- Other name: Francois Chau
- Occupation: Actor
- Years active: 1985–present

François Chau (born October 26, 1959) is a Cambodian-American actor. He is known to television audiences for his roles as Dr. Pierre Chang on Lost (2005–10), Zane on K.C. Undercover (2015–17), Jules-Pierre Mao on The Expanse (2015–18), as well as the voice of Quick Kick on the original animated series G.I. Joe: A Real American Hero (1985).

Chau is also known for portraying Shredder in the superhero film Teenage Mutant Ninja Turtles II: The Secret of the Ooze, Lieutenant Winston "Vagabond" Chang in the Wing Commander video games, and for voicing Dr. Raymond Shen in XCOM: Enemy Unknown and its sequel XCOM 2.

== Early life ==
Chau was born in Phnom Penh, Cambodia, of Chinese and Vietnamese descent. When he was roughly 6 years old, he and his family moved to Saigon (now Ho Chi Minh City). At the age of 7, Chau moved from Saigon to France due to the Vietnam War and after a year moved to Washington, D.C., United States. Chau and his family settled there, and he was also schooled there.

After he graduated from college, Chau moved out to Los Angeles where he has remained since and now lives with his wife and daughter.

== Career ==
Chau has had a number of diverse roles, playing Chinese, Japanese and even Hmong characters, most notably as Dr. Martin Ng in the American sci-fi series Gemini Division, and as Dr. Pierre Chang in 17 episodes of ABC's Lost.

Chau has also taken on a number of smaller TV roles. He has appeared as Koo Yin, a Chinese consul in the drama 24 and a Chinese diplomat in Stargate SG-1. He was the voice of Quick Kick on G.I. Joe: A Real American Hero and Dr. Shen in XCOM: Enemy Unknown, and he portrayed Lieutenant Winston 'Vagabond' Chang in the Wing Commander III and Wing Commander IV video games. He was the voice of Sensei Ishikawa in the Ghost of Tsushima video game.

Chau has appeared as a guest star in The Adventures of Brisco County, Jr., The Unit, NUMB3RS, ER, Baywatch, Alias, Shark, Criminal Minds, Grey's Anatomy, JAG, Medium, The X-Files, Last Man Standing, and NCIS.

He was also featured in Chris Brown's music video Fine China, the 2013 film 21 & Over, the television film 9/11: The Twin Towers, and Teenage Mutant Ninja Turtles II: The Secret of the Ooze, where he physically played Shredder.

His latest projects have included a Syfy production, The Expanse, starring as recurring character Jules-Pierre Mao, father of main character Julie Mao, and a recurring role as Arthur's step-father Walter on The Tick. He has also appeared in the Disney Channel spy-action comedy, K.C. Undercover, where he plays Zane, an evil villain who kidnaps K.C. and threatens to kill her family, due to a checkered history with them.

Chau portrayed mob-boss Mr. Keo in Cathy Yan's live action DC adaptation of Birds of Prey, starring Margot Robbie.

Chau appeared on The George Lucas Talk Show during a fundraiser where various guests appeared for a marathon of the entirety of the seventh season of the HBO series Arliss. In 2019, he starred in the science fiction horror film The Honeymoon Phase.

On stage, Chau played Haing S. Ngor in the biographical play The Survivor: A Cambodian Odyssey in 1993. He starred in Art for the East West Players and Dr. Heng in Extraordinary Chambers at the Geffen Playhouse. The latter earned him a nomination for Best Featured Actor in a Play at the 2011 Ovation Awards.

== Personal life ==
Chau is married and has a daughter.

== Filmography ==
=== Film ===
Year	Title	Role	Notes
1987	G.I. Joe: The Movie	Quick Kick (voice)	Direct-to-video
1989	The Iron Triangle	ARVN Captain Duc	
1991	Teenage Mutant Ninja Turtles II: The Secret of the Ooze	The Shredder	Credited as Francois Chau
1992	Rapid Fire	Detective Farris	
1993	Point of No Return	Building Security Guard	
1994	Blue Tiger	Soya	
1995	No Way Back	FBI Agent Gim Takakura	
1997	Beverly Hills Ninja	Izumo	
1997	City of Industry	"Uncle" Luke	
1997	Wounded	Mr. Lee	
1997	Chinese Box	Mr. Wong	Uncredited
1998	Lethal Weapon 4	Chung Li-lum	
1999	Godzilla 2000	Professor Yujj Shinoda (voice)	English version, dubbed Takehiro Murata
1999	Paper Bullets	Yang	
2000	What's Cooking?	Duc Nguyen	Credited as Francois Chau
2000	Deep Core	Crewmember	
2003	Paris	Mr. Kim	
2006	Rescue Dawn	Province Governor	Credited as Francois Chau
2009	The Lodger	Sam	Credited as Francois Chau
2009	Ingenious	Mr. Chow	
2009	Powder Blue	Butcher	Uncredited
2013	21 & Over	Dr. Chang	Credited as Francois Chau
2014	Office Ninja	Kenji	
2015	The Boy Next Door	Detective Johnny Chou	Credited as Francois Chau
2016	The Last Tour	Colonel Tran	
2019	The Honeymoon Phase	The Director	
2020	Birds of Prey	Mr. Keo	
2021	Raya and the Last Dragon	Wahn (voice)	
2026	Avatar Aang: The Last Airbender	Monk Gyatso (voice)	

==== Short films ====
Year	Title	Role	Notes
1986	Kusei: Endangered Species	Alien (voice)	
1986	Chisai Samurai	Bandit #1	
1999	At Face Value	Kee Sung Park	
2006	No. 6	Yoon	
2007	Orchard Orientation Film Outtakes	Dr. Edgar Halliwax	Direct-to-video
2010	Lost: Epilogue - The New Man in Charge	Dr. Pierre Chang	Uncredited; Direct-to-video
2010	Deadbeat	Dad	
2013	Chris Brown: Fine China	Father / Mafia Boss	Direct-to-video
2014	A Day of Havoc	Doom	
2017	F**Ked Up	Daddy Chao	Direct-to-video

=== Television ===
Year	Title	Role	Notes
1985	G.I. Joe: A Real American Hero	Quick Kick (voice)	11 episodes
1987	Hill Street Blues	Emperor Leader	Episode: "A Pound of Flesh"; Credited as Francois Chau
1988	Vietnam War Story	"Jojo"	Episode: "Dusk to Dawn"; Credited as Francois Chau
1989	Tour of Duty	Vietnamese Man	Episode: "The Volunteer"
1989	The Karate Kid: The Animated Series	Additional voices	Episode: "My Brother's Keeper"; Credited as Francois Chau
1989	Wiseguy	—N/a	Episode: "Battle of the Barge"
1990	China Beach	White Mouse	Episode: "Phoenix"
1990	Hiroshima: Out of the Ashes	Captain Fukuda	Television film
1991	The Flash	Johnny Choi	Episode: "Captain Cold"; Credited as Francois Chau
1991	Baywatch	Tadashi	Episode: "Nightmare Bay"; Credited as Francois Chau
1991	MacGyver	Chi	Episode: "The Coltons"; Credited as Francois Chau
1991	Reasonable Doubts	Joey	Episode: "...and Sleep Won't Come"; Credited as Francois Chau
1992	Tequila and Bonetti	Gang Member	Episode: "Language of the Heart"
1992	Intruders	Lab Technician	2 episodes Television miniseries Credited as Francois Chau
1993	Wild Palms	Hiro	3 episodes Television miniseries
1994	Viper	Bobby Murabito	Episode: "Mind Games"
1994	The Adventures of Brisco County, Jr.	Aide	Episode: "And That Makes Three"; Credited as Francois Chau
1994	Time Trax	Cano Chan	Episode: "The Last M.I.A."
1995	Tokyo Bound	Male Voice	Television film
1996	Shattered Mind	Resident	Television film
1996	ER	Neuro Resident	Episode: "Baby Shower"
1996	Goode Behavior	—N/a	Episode: "Goode and Fried"
1997	ER	Neurosurgeon	Episode: "Ambush"; Credited as Francois Chau
1997	Melrose Place	Businessman	Episode: "The Doctor Is In... Deep"
1997	Profit	Mr. Wong	Episode: "Chinese Box"; Credited as Francois Chau
1998	Night Man	Chinese Intelligence Officer	Episode: "House of Soul"
1999	Sons of Thunder	Dow Long	Episode: "Lost & Found"; Credited as Francois Chau
1999	Nash Bridges	Albert Lee	Episode: "High Society"
2000	JAG	Kin Ku	Episode: "The Bridge at Kang So Ri"; Credited as Francois Chau
2000	Walker, Texas Ranger	Mr. Chen	3 episodes Credited as Francois Chau
2001	JAG	General Shin Wa Chen	Episode: "Dog Robber"; Credited as Francois Chau
2002	The Invisible Man	Chen Po Li	Episode: "The Invisible Woman"
2003	Stargate: SG-1	Chinese Ambassador	Episode: "Disclosure"
2003	Dragnet	Chief Edward Laseur	Episode: "Let's Make a Deal"
2003	The Agency	Jin-Gui Kim	Episode: "Our Man in Washington"
2003	Line of Fire	Tran Mai	Episode: "Boom, Swagger, Boom"
2004	Alias	Mr. Cho	Episode: "Crossings"
2004	Helter Skelter	Dr. Noguchi	Television film
2004	North Shore	Satoshi Ohashi	Episode: "Tessa"
2005	24	Consul Koo Yin	Episode: "Day 4: 2:00 a.m.–3:00 a.m."
2005–10	Lost	Dr. Pierre Chang / Various	17 episodes
2005	Grey's Anatomy	Dr. Chue	Episode: "Bring the Pain"; Credited as Francois Chau
2006	Popcorn Zen	Bandit #1	Episode: "#2.2"
2006	9/11: The Twin Towers	Hong Zhu	Television film
2006	Numbers	Kaj-Jan Chen	Episode: "The Mole"; Credited as Francois Chau
2007	The Unit	Captain	Episode: "Sub-Conscious"; Credited as Francois Chau
2007	Shark	Mike Wong	Episode: "Dr. Laura"
2008	Medium	Doctor	Episode: "Do You Hear What I Hear?"; Credited as Francois Chau
2008	Gemini Division	Dr. Martin Ng	6 episodes
2009	Gary Unmarried	Bobby Kim	Episode: "Gary and the Trophy"
2010	The Deep End	Lewis Chin	Episode: "Where There's Smoke"
2010	Lost: Untangled	Dr. Pierre Chang	2 episodes
2011	Chuck	Guillermo Chan	Episode: "Chuck Versus the First Bank of Evil"; Credited as Francois Chau
2011	The Chicago Code	Chairman Lau	Episode: "O'Leary's Cow"; Credited as Francois Chau
2011	Franklin & Bash	Mr. Han	Episode: "Jennifer of Troy"; Credited as Francois Chau
2011	Childrens Hospital	Mr. Lee	Episode: "Nip/Tug"; Credited as Francois Chau
2011	Castle	Clifford Lee	Episode: "Kick the Ballistics"; Credited as Francois Chau
2011	Charlie's Angels	Frankie Han	Episode: "They Are Not Saints"; Credited as Francois Chau
2012	NCIS: Los Angeles	Binh Tran	Episode: "The Dragon and the Fairy"
2012	Awake	John Koh	Episode: "Game Day"; Credited as Francois Chau
2012	BFFs	Jessica's Father	2 episodes
2013	The Secret Life of the American Teenager	Dr. Chan	Episode: "It's a Miracle"; Credited as Francois Chau
2013	Body of Proof	Chinese Consolate	Episode: "Disappearing Act"
2013	Nikita	Dr. Kang	Episode: "Til Death Do Us Part"
2013	Childrens Hospital	Kaiju	Episode: "Triangles"; Credited as Francois Chau
2013	Aqua Teen Hunger Force	Bill	Episode: "Storage Zeebles"
2013	The Mentalist	Mr. Nguyen	Episode: "Green Thumb"
2013	The Ordained	Howard Ping	Television film
2014	Hawaii Five-0	Gary 'Aikupu	Episode: "Ma lalo o ka 'ili"
2014	Rizzoli & Isles	Harold Chen	Episode: "If You Can't Stand the Heat"; Credited as Francois Chau
2014	Criminal Minds	Dr. Jack Chun	Episode: "The Itch"
2014	Bones	Victor Lee	Episode: "The Lost Love in the Foreign Land"; Credited as Francois Chau
2015	Major Crimes	Raymond Phan	Episode: "Four of a Kind"; Credited as Francois Chau
2015–17	K.C. Undercover	Zane	7 episodes
2015–18	The Expanse	Jules-Pierre Mao	13 episodes Credited as Francois Chau
2016	Aquarius	South Vietnamese Consul	Episode: "When My Guitar Gently Weeps"
2016	Berlin Station	Peter Shipley	Episode: "Station to Station"; Credited as Francois Chau
2016	Grand Junction	Jae Kim	Television film
2017	MacGyver	Richard Sang	Episode: "Compass"; Credited as Francois Chau
2017–19	The Tick	Walter	10 episodes Credited as Francois Chau
2018	The X-Files	Peter Wong	Episode: "Ghouli"
2018–21	Last Man Standing	Henry	3 episodes Credited as Francois Chau
2019	NCIS	Henry Deng	Episode: "Bears and Cubs"; Credited as Francois Chau
2019	Veronica Mars	Hu	Episode: "Spring Break Forever"; Credited as Francois Chau
2019	No Good Nick	Detective Pham	Episode: "The Fool's Errand"
2019	Room 104	Dr. Blake	Episode: "Itchy"
2019	How to Get Away with Murder	Carl's Lawyer	Episode: "I Hate the World"
2020	Magnum, P.I.	Kinny	Episode: "A Game of Cat and Mouse"; Credited as Francois Chau
2020	Space Command	Jerome Kiriyama	Episode: "Ripple Effect"
2020	(home)Schooled	Principal Coleman	Television film
2021	Fantasy Island	Brent Lee	Episode: "His and Hers/The Heartbreak Hotel"
2021	The Good Doctor	Leonard Song	Episode: "Crazytown"
2022	Chicago Med	Patrick Choi	Episode: "What You Don't Know Can't Hurt You"; Credited as Francois Chau
2022	American Gigolo	Don Clyborne	4 episodes
2023	Quantum Leap	Lewis Tan	Episode: "Paging Dr. Song"
2023	Law & Order: Organized Crime	Michael Quan	2 episodes
2023	Barry	Bong	3 episodes
2024	Avatar: The Last Airbender	Great Sage	2 episodes
2024	The Penguin	Feng Zhao	3 episodes Miniseries
2024	Laid	Ruby's dad	Episode: "Il Mostro del Sesso"

=== Video games ===
Year	Title	Role	Notes
1994	Wing Commander III: Heart of the Tiger	Lieutenant Winston "Vagabond" Chang (live action)	
1995	Wing Commander IV: The Price of Freedom	Lieutenant Winston "Vagabond" Chang (live action)	
2000	Starlancer	Ronin Wing Leader	
2012	XCOM: Enemy Unknown	Dr. Raymond Shen	Credited as Francois Chau
2016	XCOM 2	Dr. Raymond Shen	
2020	Ghost of Tsushima	Sensei Sadanobu Ishikawa	Voice and motion capture
2023	The Expanse: A Telltale Series	Jules-Pierre Mao	Voice and likeness
