= Blue Tiger (film) =

- Directed by: Norberto Barba
- Written by: Takashi Shimizu; Joel Soisson
- Produced by: Aki Komine; Michael Leahy
- Starring: Virginia Madsen; Ryo Ishibashi; Yuji Okumoto
- Cinematography: Christopher Walling
- Edited by: Caroline Ross
- Music by: David C. Williams
- Distributed by: First Look International
- Release dates: April 3, 1994 (Japan and United States)
- Running time: 88 minutes
- Countries: United States; Japan
- Languages: English, Japanese
- Budget: $4 million

Blue Tiger is a 1994 American action thriller film directed by Norberto Barba, and starring Virginia Madsen, Ryo Ishibashi and Yuji Okumoto.

== Plot ==
Gina Hayes is a sweet and dedicated mother to her little son. One day, while shopping with him for a Halloween mask, her son is accidentally shot through the chest by a Japanese gunman who is trying to kill an opposing gang of bus operators. Gina notices that the gunman has a picture of a blue tiger tattooed on his chest. She becomes obsessed with vengeance and has an identical red tiger etched into her skin. She then tracks down the killer and plots his death. This leads her into the world of the Japanese Mafia, where she uses her sexual allure and newfound knowledge of the Japanese language to search the tattooed men for the same blue tiger bearer that killed her son.

== Cast ==
- Virginia Madsen as Gina Hayes
- Toru Nakamura as Seiji
- Ryo Ishibashi as Gan
- Yuji Okumoto as Lieutenant Sakagami
- Harry Dean Stanton as Smith
- Francois Chau as Soya
- Michael Madsen as Gun Salesman

== Production ==
American Yakuza along with Blue Tiger was announced as a part of a series of co-productions between First Look Studios and Japanese company Ozla Productions. The films in question were intended to be a mixture of Japanese and American cultures in the action-adventure genre. These films were part of a short lived venture by Toei Company to produce higher end V-Cinema releases under the imprint V-America with Toei partnering with international partners as to ensure their financial exposure was the same as one of their own locally produced V-Cinema projects. Initially Alex Cox was announced as the director.

== Release ==
Blue Tiger was released in United States on home video on February 28, 1995
