= Quick Kick (G.I. Joe) =

Character from G.I. Joe

- G.I. Joe character
- Quick Kick as seen in the Sunbow/Marvel G.I. Joe animated series.
- First appearance: 1985
- Voiced by: François Chau

In-universe information
- Affiliation: G.I. Joe
- Specialty: Silent Weapons; Martial Arts Expert
- File name: Ito, MacArthur S.
- Birth place: Los Angeles, California
- SN: 631-42-7104
- Rank: E-4 (Corporal)
- Primary MOS: Infantry
- Secondary MOS: Intelligence

Quick Kick is a fictional character from the G.I. Joe: A Real American Hero toyline, comic books and animated series. He is the G.I. Joe Team's martial arts expert, and debuted in 1985.

== Profile ==
His real name is MacArthur S. Ito, and his rank is that of Corporal. Quick Kick was born in Los Angeles, California.

Quick Kick's Japanese father and Korean mother owned a grocery store in Watts. He found difficulty being accepted by either the Japanese or Korean community because of his mixed heritage. Quick Kick also has a passion for basketball, but was always turned down because of his height. Therefore, he turned to martial arts, and has earned black belts in Tae Kwon Do, Goju Ryu Karate, Southern Praying Mantis Kung-Fu, Tai Chi Sword, Zen Sword, and Wing-Chun fighting arts. He later worked in Hollywood as a stuntman, where the U.S. Army noticed his skills and recruited him for the elite Rangers. After the Army, he went on to join the G.I. Joe Team. Quick Kick is also a qualified expert with all NATO and Warsaw Pact small arms.

== Toys ==
- A Real American Hero (1985)

The first Quick Kick action figure to come out was part of the 1985 wave of G.I. Joe: A Real American Hero toys. He was part of the series of carded action figures to come out that year.

- The Incredible Shrinking Joes (1990)

Quick Kick was a part of miniature statues of G.I. Joe characters in a toy-only storyline The Incredible Shrinking Joes.

- G.I.-Joe 25th Anniversary Series (2008)

A Quick Kick figure was included in the Pyramid of Darkness box set along with Snake Eyes, Major Bludd, Cobra Commander and a Pyramid of Darkness control cube.

== Comic Books ==
=== Marvel Comics ===
In the Marvel Comics G.I. Joe series, Quick Kick first appeared in G.I. Joe: A Real American Hero #45 (March 1986). His first mission involved aiding Flint, Alpine, and Spirit on a mission to Cobra Island to retrieve Ripcord, who had parachuted to the island, against orders, in search of his girlfriend, Candy Appel.

Quick Kick, Stalker, Outback, and Snow Job were in a mission to Borovia when they were cornered by corrupt aspects of its military. Outback, protesting, is ordered to escape and does so. The other three spend many months in a Borovian gulag, rescued only by an unsanctioned G.I. Joe team. The ex-prisoners reassure Outback they hold no hard feelings.

Later, Quick Kick and Outback are stuck in a bus full of Mexican tourists that is under siege by terrorists. Though the enemy is defeated, two of the tourists are killed.

Quick Kick's final appearance was issue #109. Several Joes, including Quick Kick, are captured by Cobra during a mission in Trucial-Abysmia. A misinterpreted order from Cobra Commander leads the Crimson Twins into thinking they are now obligated to have the Joes killed. Noting their reluctance, a S.A.W.-Viper steps up to volunteer for the task. He first kills the medic, Doc, then opens fire on the subdued, captured Joes, killing Thunder and Heavy Metal. A well-aimed knife, previously hidden, allows the survivors to escape. They steal a Cobra Rage tank. Cobra forces pursue and destroy the tank, killing Quick Kick, Breaker, and Crazylegs.

=== Devil's Due ===
Quick Kick is seen in a photo in Snake Eyes' home in the first issue of the Devil's Due series. He receives a profile in the Battlefiles Sourcebook. Even though this is not shown, it is implied Quick-Kick's name is part of the memorial to deceased Joes located at Arlington National Cemetery.

=== Action Force ===
Quick Kick appears in many issues of the alternate continuity 'Marvel UK' series "Action Force". He rescues his friends from imprisonment on the Argent Oil Platform, a move that fits into Destro's plans to publicly discredit 'Action Force'.

He is the focus of a three-part issue where he defies the team to rescue an old friend from a cult. It turns out the man is a leader of a Cobra splinter group and Quick Kick is forced to take the organization down from the inside. The third part has a secondary story where Quick Kick remembers meeting the Marvel Comics martial artists Iron Fist, Elektra, Batroc the Leaper and Shang Chi. This contradicts regular G.I. Joe continuity as those characters do not exist there.

== Animated series ==
=== Sunbow ===
Quick Kick first appears in the Sunbow G.I. Joe animated series in "The Pyramid of Darkness" mini-series. He is depicted as a karate movie actor filming a commercial for Frozen Fudgy Bars who had been abandoned in the arctic by his director. He saves Alpine and Bazooka from leopard seals, then fights and defeats Storm Shadow. He joins the G.I. Joe Team afterwards and leads them to the Cobra Temple, where he plays a role in their victory by yodeling with Alpine and Bazooka, causing a large rock to fall and destroy a Cobra weapon.

In the episode "Lasers in the Night", Quick Kick finds a girlfriend, a college student named Amber, and protects her from Cobra when she tries to join the Joe team. In the two-part episode "Captives of Cobra", he is one of the Joes whose families are captured and brainwashed by Cobra. Throughout the series, Quick Kick also served as a counterpart to Storm Shadow. In "Cobra Quake", he trains martial arts students in Japan, and is one of the Joes who stop a Cobra plot to use earthquake bombs on Japan. In "Excalibur", he is one of the Joes setting up an anti-Cobra radar system in Britain. Quick Kick breaks his leg in an encounter with Storm Shadow; though it is healed instantly by Spirit, he breaks it again in another confrontation with Storm Shadow.

Quick Kick is featured in one of the series' PSAs, in which he saves a kid falling from a poorly built treehouse and teaches him the importance of planning before doing.

He is voiced by François Chau. All of his appearances in Season 2 are silent.

==== G.I. Joe: The Movie ====
Quick Kick also appeared briefly in the 1987 animated film G.I. Joe: The Movie. He is part of a unit of Joes led by Roadblock who go after the fleeing Cobra forces after Cobra's first attempt to steal the Broadcast Energy Transmitter (B.E.T.) and become captives of Cobra-La.

== Video games ==
Quick Kick is one of the featured characters in the Action Force II computer game.

== Other media ==
Quick Kick is mentioned as a 'unique character' in an essay in the non-fiction book 'Integrating English: developing English language and literacy in the multilingual classroom'.
