= ARB (band) =

Japanese rock band

ARB (Alexander's Ragtime Band) is a Japanese rock band that formed in 1977 and released their debut single the following year. Its members are Ryo Ishibashi, Koya Naito, Ebi, and Keith. Mitsuhiro Saito from Bow Wow and Jean-Jacques Burnel from The Stranglers were also members for a period of time.

== Discography ==
=== Singles ===
- "Norainu" (25 October 1978)
- "Wild lowteen girl" (25 April 1979)
- "Tamashii Kogashite" (20 December 1979)
- "Nocturne club" (21 July 1980)
- "BLACK X'MAS" (11 November 1980)
- "Daddy's Shoes" (21 February 1981)
- "Crazy love" (21 May 1982)
- "Saraba Aibou" (21 November 1982)
- "Troubled kids" (21 April 1983)
- "Deep Inside" (21 March 1985)
- "Blue Color Dancer" (21 July 1985)
- "God bless the "Ring"" (21 March 1986)
- "AFTER '45" (21 August 1986)
- "Private girl" (21 November 1986)
- "HAPPINESS" (21 May 1987)
- "System in System" (21 June 1988)
- "Long Long Way" (5 October 1988)
- "MURDER GAME" (21 October 1989)
- "TOKYO OUTSIDER" (21 February 1998)
- "INFINITELY" (23 September 1998)
- "Hangyaku no Burusu wo Utae" (17 July 1999)
- "HARD-BOILED CITY" (13 June 2001)

=== Albums ===
- A.R.B (21 June 1978)
- BAD NEWS (21 May 1980)
- BOYS & GIRLS (21 March 1981)
- Yubi wo Narase! / Snap Your Fingers (21 November 1981)
- W (21 June 1982)
- Toraburu Chudoku (21 April 1983)
- A.R.B LIVE / Tamashii Kogashite (5 December 1983)
- YELLOW BLOOD (21 September 1984)
- Sakyu 1945nen (3 October 1985)
- WORK SONGS (21 April 1986)
- ONE and ONLY DREAMs (21 November 1986)
- ROCK OVER JAPAN (21 June 1987)
- DAYS OF A.R.B Vol.1 (21 June 1987)
- DAYS OF A.R.B Vol.2 (21 June 1987)
- PAPERS BED (21 June 1988) Oricon Albums Chart number 35
- Sympathy (8 November 1989) Oricon number 28
- LOVE THE LIVE (21 January 1989) Oricon number 38
- BALLADS AND WORK SONGS (3 October 1990) Oricon number 25
- RED BOX - ARB LIVE (1980-1990) (28 December 1990) Oricon number 37
- BLACK Xmas - A.R.B. SECRET SINGLES (21 June 1991) Oricon number 40
- DAYS OF ARB Vol.1 (1978-1983) (21 November 1993)
- DAYS OF ARB Vol.2 (1984-1986) (21 November 1993)
- DAYS OF ARB Vol.3 (1986-1990) (21 November 1993)
- SYMPATHY (28 June 1995)
- BOYS & GIRLS (28 June 1995)
- Yubi wo Narase! (28 June 1995)
- W (28 June 1995)
- Toraburu Chudoku (28 June 1995)
- YELLOW BLOOD (28 June 1995)
- Sakyu 1945nen (28 June 1995)
- WORK SONGS (28 June 1995)
- ONE AND ONLY DREAMS (28 June 1995)
- ROCK OVER JAPAN (28 June 1995)
- PAPERS BED (28 June 1995)
- BAD NEWS (28 June 1995)

=== VIDEO ===
- YELLOW BLOOD (21 October 1984)
- Sakyu 1945nen (21 November 1985)
- SWEAT, HEART & BRAIN (21 March 1988)
- LOVE THE LIVE (21 January 1989)
- THE LONGEST TOUR (21 January 1990)
- Tamashii Kogashite (21 July 1991)
- ARB is BACK!! (21 June 1998)
- 1998 Days of ARB (2 September 1999)
- ARB CLIPS Hangyaku no Buruzu wo Utae (19 April 2000)

=== DVD ===
- LIVE! EL DORADO (16 June 2000)
- Raibu Teikoku DVD Sirizu "ARB" (2 July 2003)
- RED BOX 1978-1990 COMPLETE DVD SET (17 September 2003)
- LOCUS visualize 1998-2004 ARB LIVE BEST (15 September 2004)

== In popular culture ==
The 2011 Japanese animated television show Mawaru-Penguindrum uses several of the band's songs in the show. Remixed versions are covered by members of the show's vocal cast.
