= The Honeymoon Phase =

- Film poster
- Directed by: Phillip G. Carroll Jr.
- Written by: Phillip G. Carroll Jr.
- Cinematography: Joe Staehly
- Music by: Chris Ryan
- Production company: Aspire Motion Pictures
- Distributed by: Dark Sky Films
- Release date: November 3, 2019 (First Glance Film Festival)
- Running time: 89 minutes
- Country: United States
- Language: English

The Honeymoon Phase is a 2019 sci-fi horror film that was written and directed by Phillip G. Carroll Jr., marking his feature film directorial debut.

Of the film, he has compared it to the science fiction series Black Mirror.

== Synopsis ==
Tom and Eve have agreed to participate in a 30-day experiment called The Millennium Project, where they stay at a luxurious home free of charge and at the end of which, they will receive payment of $50,000. They will spend the time alone and will not be able to leave, however anything they need will be provided for them. According to The Director, the experiment is a social one that will explore human relationships and the nature of love. The experiment called for a newly married couple, however Tom and Eve have lied about their marital status because they are desperate for money. The pair have only started their relationship relatively recently, so Eve knows little about Tom or what danger he could pose to her. This causes her to question the reality of everything around her. As they spend more time in the home Tom begins to grow abusive and also insists that she become pregnant. She does eventually become pregnant, realizing that Tom had poked holes in the condoms to ensure conception.

Ultimately it is revealed that the project was actually a front for a cloning experiment, as The Director was hoping to clone his deceased wife. A second Tom was cloned, but was shown to have been abusive while interacting with Eve. Chaos ensues and the two Toms fight, confusing Eve as to which one is the abuser and which is the original. She chooses the one she believes to be the real, kind Tom. The two flee the lab, however Eve is later strangled by Tom while the two are in bed. The film leaves the identity of the final Tom ambiguous, implying that Eve could have chosen incorrectly or that the original Tom would have inevitably become abusive and had finally snapped.

== Cast ==
- François Chau as The Director
- Tara Westwood as The Handler
- Ione Butler as The Terminal
- Mike Sutton as John
- Chloe Carroll as Eve
- Jim Schubin as Tom
- Linda Horwatt as Julie
- Michael Wetherbee as Dr. Kwait
- Tariq James Arthur as Business Man
- Daniel Fakih as The Captain
- Kayla Anthony as Dr. Pizzileo

== Production ==
Director Phillip G. Carroll Jr. had worked on short films prior to coming up with the idea for The Honeymoon Phase, which he came up with while in bed with his wife. He asked her "What if you woke up and I wasn't the man you thought I was?" Carroll began outlining the script in 2016 and in the following year began writing. He wrote the characters of Eve and The Director with his wife Chloe and François Chau in mind, respectively, and was pleased when Chau accepted the role. The film marked Carroll's first time directing a feature-length film, as his prior movies had all been shorts.

Filming took place at a home rented through Airbnb and the crew was able to borrow some props from a hospital for free. Prior to shooting Carroll blocked scenes between his wife and Jim Schubin, who plays her husband, with his iPhone to build up the relationship and trust, as well as to have "a no-budget iPhone version of the movie to use as reference on set." He re-wrote one of the movie's scenes between Chloe and Schubin, as Carroll felt that it was missing a "key beat". Filming the scene was difficult as the Ronin camera platform rented for the scene was experiencing technical difficulties, to the point where it became necessary for them to completely re-film it using a handheld camera. Carroll has described the scene as his favorite one in The Honeymoon Phase and has described the overall film as "a feature length episode of Black Mirror."

== Release ==
The Honeymoon Phase had its world premiere on November 3, 2019, at the FirstGlance Film Festival in Philadelphia. It went on to screen at several other film festivals, including FrightFest. On August 21, 2020 The Honeymoon Phase was released to VOD.

== Reception ==
The Honeymoon Phase has a rating of 77% on review aggregator Rotten Tomatoes, based on 13 reviews. Common elements of praise centered upon the film's acting and suspense, the latter of which Jump Cut Online called "just stunning". Nerdly was also favorable, writing that "Full of indie sci-fi delights and a few creepy moments, The Honeymoon Phase is a welcome kiss at the front door. Just keep your eye out for that knife hiding behind its back." Criticism focused on the movie's "bite", as Starburst and Flickering Myth both felt that it lacked satirical bite. Film Threat drew a negative comparison to Black Mirror, criticizing what they saw as plot holes and underuse of the film's themes.
