= No Way Back (1995 film) =

1995 film by Frank Cappello

- Theatrical release poster
- Directed by: Frank A. Cappello
- Written by: Frank A. Cappello; Derrick DeMarney
- Produced by: Aki Komine; Joel Soisson
- Starring: Russell Crowe; Helen Slater; Etsushi Toyokawa; Michael Lerner
- Cinematography: Richard Clabaugh
- Edited by: Sonny Baskin
- Music by: David C. Williams
- Production company: Ozla Productions; NEO Motion Pictures; First Look Studios; Toei Video; Tohokushinsha Film
- Distributed by: Columbia TriStar Home Video (U.S.); Toei (Japan)
- Release dates: May 13, 1995 (Japan); December 20, 1996 (U.S.)
- Running time: 91 minutes
- Countries: United States; Japan
- Languages: English; Japanese

No Way Back is a 1995 action thriller film co-written and directed by Frank A. Cappello, and starring Russell Crowe, Helen Slater, Etsushi Toyokawa, and Michael Lerner.

== Plot ==
When an undercover FBI agent with a secret agenda murders the skinhead son of mob boss Frank Serlano, the mafioso retaliates by kidnapping the son of Zach Grant, the FBI agent in charge of the botched undercover sting.

Simultaneously, Yuji Kobayashi, wanted dead by his fellow yakuza for forthcoming legal testimony, breaks free from Grant's supervision during a trans-Atlantic flight. He forces their airplane, along with Mary, the ditzy stewardess accompanying them, to make an emergency-landing. In an attempt to free Yuji from the gaze of the yakuza and regain custody of Zach's child from the mafia, the three crash survivors go off of the grid and set into motion a dangerous plan that could quickly facilitate their untimely demise.

== Cast ==
- Russell Crowe as FBI Special Agent-in-Charge Zack Grant
- Helen Slater as Mary
- Etsushi Toyokawa as Yuji Kobayashi
- Michael Lerner as Frank Serlano
- Kyūsaku Shimada as Tetsuro
- Kristopher Logan as "Mr. Contingency"
- Kelly Hu as FBI Agent Seiko Kobayashi
- Andrew J. Ferchland as Eric Grant
- Ian Ziering as Victor Serlano
- Caroline Lagerfelt as Emily Fukes
- François Chau as FBI Agent Gim Takakura

== Production ==
The film was produced after the success of American Yakuza prompted Overseas Filmgroup to move forward on another film centering around the Yakuza.

== Release ==
The film was released theatrically in Japan by Toei Company on May 13, 1995. In the United States, No Way Back was first broadcast on HBO on December 20, 1996, before being released on home video on June 17, 1997.

== Reception ==
Denise Lanctot of Entertainment Weekly rated it D+ and wrote that it would have made a better video game. Scott Hamilton and Chris Holland of Radio Times rated it 1/5 stars and called it a "preposterous crime thriller". R.L. Shaffer of IGN rated it 5/10 and recommended that fans of the stars watch their other films instead. Ian Jane of DVD Talk rated it 2.5/5 stars and wrote, "A wholly mediocre thriller, No Way Back will be of passing interesting to Russell Crowe fans and those who enjoy low budget action movies but outside of that group, it'll probably fall pretty flat."
