= First Look Studios =

American film distributor

First Look Studios, Inc.
- Formerly: Overseas Filmgroup, Inc. (1980–2001); First Look Media, Inc. (2001–2005)
- Type: Public
- Traded as: OTC Pink: FRST.PK
- Industry: Film production Home video
- Founded: 1980; 46 years ago
- Founders: Robert Little; Ellen Little
- Defunct: 2010; 16 years ago
- Fate: Acquired by Nu Image in 2007; Reorganized into Millennium Entertainment in 2010
- Successor: Millennium Entertainment (2010–2014); Alchemy (2014–2016); FilmRise (2016–present)
- Headquarters: Century City, California
- Products: DVD, Blu-ray
- Total assets: $25 million
- Divisions: First Look Pictures; First Look Home Entertainment; First Look Television https://firstlookstudiosinc.com/

First Look Studios, Inc. was an American independent film and home video distributor based in Los Angeles, California. The company specialized in the acquisition and direct distribution of, and worldwide license and sale of distribution rights to, independently produced feature films and television series.

== History ==
=== Overseas Filmgroup ===
In 1980, Robert and Ellen Little founded Overseas Filmgroup as a film sales company for foreign markets. Overseas Filmgroup expanded towards film financing to give the company greater control over its output. From the company's foundation, it competed with fellow, also-defunct film producers J&M Film Sales (later J&M Entertainment), Manson International and Producers Sales Organization as the most successful company with global film sales.

Overseas Filmgroup decided to pay $3 million in order to set up operations for different areas worldwide such as Spain, Arizona, Texas, Taiwan, Italy, southern California and Colorado in the mid-1980s, and by 1986, the company became active, setting up a number of domestic theatrical, home video and television syndication sales with New World Pictures and other distributors.

In 1987, while other sales companies were gaining production outfits, the Littles stated that they would avoid production, so Overseas Filmgroup had set up a company policy stating that they would acquire new films via distribution advances, and the three new movies, namely those directed by Roland Emmerich, will be offered to various MIFED (Mercato internazionale del film e del documentario) buyers. The company was the original international home video distributor for the show Tales from the Darkside, until it was sold off to Lorimar-Telepictures in late November 1987 after Lorimar International president Jeff Schlesinger saw all episodes of the show that was well-suited and combined to become eight ninety-minute episodes from the show.

Films ranged from genre titles such as Blue Tiger (starring Virginia Madsen) and No Way Back (starring New Zealand actor Russell Crowe) to art house films, including Antonia's Line, Mrs. Dalloway, The Secret of Roan Inish, Waking Ned Devine, and Titus. In 1993, the company expanded towards North American distribution through its First Look Pictures subsidiary.

In October 1996, Entertainment/Media Acquisition Corporation, a special-purpose acquisition company incorporated in the state of Delaware in December 1993 that had consummated its initial public offering in February 1995, acquired Overseas Filmgroup, and the company went public. The company stock was floated on the OTC market.

In 2000, EUE/Screen Gems acquired a minority interest in the company.

=== First Look Studios ===
In January 2001, as part of a restructuring and to reflect the company's expansion into domestic film and home video distribution, Internet content development and television commercial production, Overseas Filmgroup was renamed First Look Media (not to be confused with the news organization of the same name). The Overseas Filmgroup name remained as the international distribution division of First Look Media. In 2003, founders Robert and Ellen Little left First Look, and Overseas Filmgroup was renamed First Look International.

On July 29, 2005, the company merged with Canadian businessman Henry Winterstern's Capital Entertainment, and in September, the company's name was changed to First Look Studios. Winterstern became CEO of First Look and shared the role as chairman with EUE/Screen Gems' Chris Cooney. In November 2005, First Look acquired DEJ Productions from Blockbuster.

In March 2006, First Look acquired Ventura Distribution, a Californian home video distribution company, including its subsidiary UrbanWorks Entertainment, and the domestic television syndication rights to fifty six films from Pinnacle Entertainment. In 2006, the company launched a television syndication division known as First Look Television. By 2006, First Look's film library consisted of 700 films, and continued to add more with the financing of in house productions.

In March 2007, Henry Winterstern resigned from the company but stayed on as an adviser. The same month, Nu Image acquired a 52% stake in First Look. The deal was brokered by William Morris Independent. Following the acquisition, Nu Image and its production/distribution arm Millennium Films were given an outlet for home video and theatrical distribution

In January 2008, First Look Studios started releasing titles on Blu-Ray.

In November 2010, First Look Studios filed for bankruptcy through an assignment for the benefit of the studio's senior secured creditors. Millennium Entertainment, a new sister company formed by Nu Image, acquired most of First Look's assets and inherited many of the former key management and staff.

== Films ==
- 10 Items or Less (released theatrically by ThinkFilm)
- All About You
- American Adobo
- An American Crime
- Aqua Teen Hunger Force Colon Movie Film for Theaters (Note: Owned by Warner Bros. Pictures) (the only animated film by the company)
- As Good as Dead
- August
- Back in the Day
- Bad Lieutenant: Port of Call New Orleans
- The Breed
- A Brother's Kiss
- Chopper
- Chrystal
- The Contract
- Cool Dog
- Counterforce
- Danika
- Day of the Dead
- Day Zero
- Dedication (co distribution with The Weinstein Company)
- Eat Your Heart Out
- Ernest Goes to Africa (re released by Mill Creek Entertainment and Image Entertainment)
- Ernest in the Army (re released by Mill Creek Entertainment and Image Entertainment)
- Evelyn (co-distribution with United Artists)
- Finding Rin Tin Tin
- Firecracker
- Flu Birds
- Forty Shades of Blue
- Four Sheets to the Wind
- Frank
- Freeze Frame
- A Gentleman's Game
- Ghouls
- Glass Trap
- God's Gift
- A Guide to Recognizing Your Saints
- Hydra
- Immortal (United States distributor)
- In a Dark Place
- Infinity
- Journey to the End of the Night
- Kill Switch
- King of California
- King of the Avenue
- Labor Pains
- Leaves of Grass
- Leo
- A Little Trip to Heaven
- A Map of the World
- Marcello Mastroianni: I Remember
- Mayor of the Sunset Strip
- Meet Bill
- Midgets vs. Mascots
- Minotaur (co distribution with Lionsgate)
- Miranda
- Monster (co distribution with Newmarket Films, Media 8 Entertainment and DEJ Productions)
- Moon 44 (distributed by Moviestore Entertainment in North America)
- Mrs Dalloway
- My Son, My Son, What Have Ye Done?
- Nature Unleashed: Tornado
- Paris, je t'aime
- Party Girl
- The Prophecy (co distribution with Dimension Films)
- The Pumpkin Karver
- Relative Strangers
- The Secret of Roan Inish
- Sex and Breakfast
- Silence Becomes You
- Smiley Face
- Stiletto
- Sukiyaki Western Django
- Tara Road
- Target of Opportunity
- The Thing Below
- Thick as Thieves
- This Is The Sea
- Trading Mom (co distribution with Trimark Pictures)
- Transsiberian
- Triangle
- The Volcano Disaster (also called Volcano: Nature Unleashed)
- War, Inc.
- Welcome to Spring Break (distributed by Carolco Pictures in North America)

== Distributed lines ==
- Ultimate Fighting Championship
- Video Asia
