= Terri Hanauer =

Canadian actor and director

- Born: March 25, 1964 (age 62); Toronto, Ontario, Canada
- Occupations: Actress; television and film director; photographer
- Years active: 1981–present
- Website: http://www.terrihanauer.com

Terri Hanauer (born March 25, 1964, in Toronto, Ontario) is a Canadian-American actress, film director, screenwriter and photographer.

== Biography ==
Hanauer grew up in Canada and later moved to the United States; she holds dual citizenship in both countries. She studied at the New York University, where she obtained her degree in Theatre Arts. Later she worked as an actress in both America and Canada.

Hanauer's debut in movies came in 1977's horror film David Cronenberg's 1977 Rabid which starred Marilyn Chambers as the lead. Hanauer's death in the film was her getting killed by Chamber's character in a spa, then being put in a medium-sized freeze bitten with rabies. Her death scene is used on mostly all American VHS and DVD covers since the early 80's. at the time of filming, she was credited as Terry Schonblum.

Hanauer began acting under the name Hanauer in 1981 with the television Scruples. Then she played several roles in television films and television series including Matlock (1989), Beauty and the Beast (1988–1989) Beggars and Choosers (2000–2001) and Havoc (2005).

Hanauer also played in the theater, she played at the Mark Taper Forum in Los Angeles and the Arena Stage in Washington D.C.

Hanauer is also an active professional photographer who has photographed over a hundred actors such as John Glover and others. Her photos appeared in magazines, advertisements and websites.

Because of her background as an actress and photographer decided to do directing and writing . She also wrote the comic theater play La Ronde De Lunch at the Skylight Theatre in Los Angeles. She won six LA Stage Scene Awardsincluding Best Director of a Comedy.
